= Beisler =

Beisler is a surname. Notable people with the surname include:

- Frank Beisler (1911–1973), American ice hockey player
- Jerry Beisler (1942–2020), American writer and cannabis activist
- Randy Beisler (born 1944), American football player

== See also ==
- Besler (disambiguation)
