= Division No. 1, Subdivision G, Newfoundland and Labrador =

Subdivision 1G
- Unorganized territory
- Division No. 1, Subdivision G
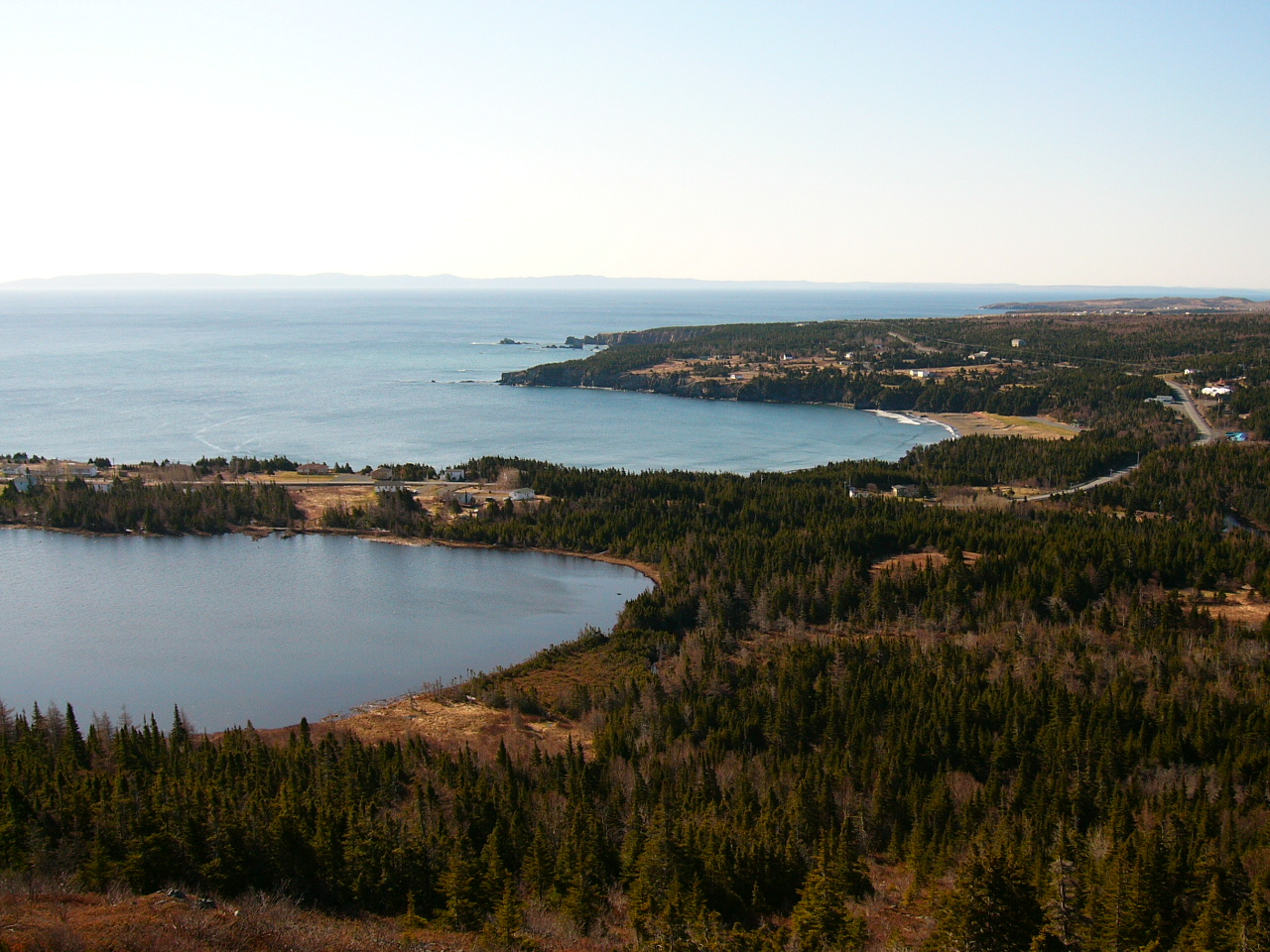
- View of Northern Bay
- Country: Canada
- Province: Newfoundland and Labrador
- Census division: Division 1

Government
  - MHA: Riley Balsom (PC, Carbonear-Trinity-Bay de Verde)
  - MP: Jonathan Rowe (CON, Terra Nova-The Peninsulas)

Area
  - Land: 308.54 km^{2} (119.13 sq mi)

Population (2016)
  - Total: 1,866
  - Density: 6/km^{2} (16/sq mi)
- Time zone: UTC-3:30 (Newfoundland Time)
  - Summer (DST): UTC-2:30 (Newfoundland Daylight)

Division No. 1, Subdivision G is an unorganized subdivision on the Avalon Peninsula in Newfoundland and Labrador, Canada. It is in Division 1 and contains the unincorporated communities of Baccalieu Island, Besom Cove, Bradley's Cove, Burnt Point, Caplin Cove, Daniel's Cove, Grates Cove, Gull Island, Job's Cove, Kingston, Long Beach, Lower Island Cove, Low Point, Northern Bay, Ochre Pit Cove, Red Head Cove, Riverhead, Smooth Cove and Western Bay.

== Baccalieu Island ==
See: Baccalieu Island

== Bradley's Cove ==
47.880°N 53.083°W Bradley's Cove is an abandoned community in Newfoundland and Labrador.

1871: BRADLEY'S COVE - A fishing settlement on the north shore of Conception Bay, district of Bay de Verds. Distant from Carbonear by road 16 miles. Mail weekly. Population 135. During the 1950s families began moving out of Bradley's Cove to nearby Western Bay, Adam's Cove and area mainly due to the lack of electricity and telephone. There are still house foundations and several root cellars intact, however is now an area where only sheep and cattle graze during the summer.

== Burnt Point ==
47°57′34″N 53°02′08″W Burnt Point is a small Canadian fishing village in the province of Newfoundland and Labrador. It is located on the north side of Conception Bay on the Bay de Verde Peninsula of the island of Newfoundland. The community of Burnt Point for the most part is on gently sloping area much higher than the coast where the wharf and fishing boats were kept.

- 1810 - First fishing premises are believed to be owned by Andrew Layman and John Tucker.
- 1869 - Census records a population of 115. The first church and road have been built by this date.
- 1880 - The first post office is in operation.
- 1905 - A lighthouse is built at Burnt Point.
- 1915 - July: the railway is built, going through Burnt Point to Bay de Verde.
- 1920 - The first public wharf is built.
- 1921 - Two cod-liver oil factories are established.
- 1930 - During a storm the ship Dekult runs ashore and claims many lives.
- 1933 - The railway takes it toll and is completely hauled up by November.

== Caplin Cove ==
See: Caplin Cove

== Daniel's Cove ==
48°07.70′N 52°58.50′W Daniel's Cove is a resettled fishing village on the northwest tip of the Bay de Verde Peninsula nestled in a valley halfway between Grates Cove and Old Perlican.

Daniel's Cove lies in two small valleys treed with two rivers running through it, and it is probable that it was settled about the same time as Old and New Perlican in the late 18th century.

The economic base for this community was the small-boat inshore cod fishery, but serves as a summer home community for a number of family descendants of the community.

- 1810 – According to tradition, a Patrick Howard settles at Daniel's Cove.
- 1836 – Census reports twenty-seven inhabitants, all Roman Catholic, in three houses.
- 1857 – The small-boat inshore fishery numbered 36, with two Irish-born residents.
- 1864 – Hutchinson's Newfoundland Dictionary (1864–1865) lists six planters in the community.
- 1897 - Post Office was established and John Howard was the Postmaster.
- 1921 - Born - Expedite Joseph Howard, son of Lawrence Howard and Margaret Howard (Kehoe) - (Served with the Newfoundland Rangers/Royal Canadian Mounted Police/Newfoundland & Labrador Government) - died April 17, 2011.
- 1925 – Rev. Father Jeremiah Howard ordained.
- 1931 – Fr. Howard, with money from his father's estate, financed the construction of a one-room school which is still standing.
- School house - Constructed somewhere between 1925 and 1928. The school house still stands as of 2009 - converted to a summer home in the 1970s
- 1935 – The population is 73.
- 1939 - Expedite Howard becomes a member of The Newfoundland Ranger Force.
- 1949 - Expedite Howard becomes a member of the Royal Canadian Mounted Police (RCMP).
- 1949 - Born - Daniel Joseph Howard, (named after village name) son of Expedite Howard & Alicia Howard (Delaney) in Stephenville, Newfoundland.
- 1950 – Brother William Howard takes his final vows in the community.
- 1954 – Rev. Father William Kelly is ordained; Daniel's Cove is partially resettled without government assistance.
- 1959 - Post Office closed on August 21.
- 1966 – Remaining thirteen residents (one family resettled to Old Perlican) after this year.
- 1996 – Two residents remain in Daniel's Cove.
- 2004 - One resident remains in Daniel's Cove
- 2009 - One resident remains in Daniel's Cove

== Grates Cove ==
See: Grates Cove, Newfoundland and Labrador

== Gull Island ==
47°57′N 53°02.5′W Gull Island is a small fishing community on the north side of Newfoundland Island, in the Province of Newfoundland and Labrador, Canada.

It is situated on Conception Bay on the eastern side of Bay de Verde Peninsula, bound on the north by Burnt Point and on the south by Northern Bay. Gull Island was named for the small rocky, bird nesting island of Gull Island located at 47°57′04.49″N 53°02′13.83″W. Séan McCann from the band Great Big Sea is from Gull Island.

Gull Island is also the location of the "Big Sprout", a waterfall approximately 100 ft. in height, located halfway up Gull Island hill (West).

== Job's Cove ==
47°58′35″N 53°00′57″W Job's Cove (/dʒoʊbz/ JOHBZ) is an unincorporated community and small fishing village on the north side of Conception Bay on the Bay de Verde Peninsula of Newfoundland and Labrador, Canada.

The community of Job's Cove for the most part is on gently sloping area much higher than the coast where the wharf and fishing boats are kept. The Droke, a very steep ravine (a valley from the road to the beach) is one of the outstanding geological features in this community.

Ray Johnson, a singer/songwriter, is from Job's Cove.

On August 14, 2025, Job's Cove was put under evacuation alert due to the Kingston Fire. On August 30, 2025, the Kingston fire was classified as under control and all evacuation orders were lifted.

== Kingston ==
47°49′N 53°07′W Kingston is a small unincorperated town located directly south of Small Point-Adam's Cove-Blackhead-Broad Cove situated in Conception Bay (Canada).

Kingston was established as Upper Small Point c. 1793 and its earliest permanent settlers were John Conroy King, Michael Hurley and Timothy O'Leary. The name was changed to Kingston in 1918. It had a population of 129 in 1940 and 158 in 1956.

On August 3, 2025, a wildfire broke out in Kingston. Early the next afternoon, evacuation orders were issued for both Kingston and Small Point-Adam's Cove-Blackhead-Broad Cove as the fire burned out of control, spreading north and south. The Kingston fire was reported at 10,708 ha (26,460 acres) on August 19 and had destroyed 203 structures (12 in Kingston). On August 30, 2025, the fire was classified as under control and all evacuation orders were lifted.

== Lower Island Cove ==
48°00′N 52°59′W Lower Island Cove is a community located on the Bay de Verde Peninsula on the north shore of Conception Bay, Newfoundland and Labrador, Canada. It is a fishing community that has seen a decrease in residents since the collapse of the cod fishery.

Legend says that a treasure was buried by the pirates at Flambro Head.

Lower Island Cove was once a thriving economic centre. Located on the northern entrance to Conception Bay, it once boasted three cod liver factories. And, before 1992, it had a thriving local fish plant. Photos at the Flambro Head Museum and Cafe attest to so many fish flakes at the turn of 1900 that hardly a spot of green grass was found in the settlement.

- 1600s – European migratory fishermen visit the area.
- 1760s - Lawrence Coughlan is stationed at Harbour Grace and is the first known missionary to visit Lower Island Cove.
- 1780 – Wesleyans construct a church.
- 1796 – The community is first referred to as Lower Island Cove instead of just Island Cove to differentiate it from Upper Island Cove near Bay Roberts.
- 1836 – The population is 551.
- 1944 – Salvation Army establishes itself in the community.
- 1990 – The community's boundaries are extended about 3 km along the highway from Redlands to Flambro Head.

Three local attractions are the Flambro Head Museum and Cafe, the Lower Island Cove Regatta and the Old Methodist Church Cemetery.

Operated by the Flambo Head Heritage Society, the Museum hosts a 1/2 km walking trail, a coffee shop, a playground complete with picnic tables. The original building housed the "Lower Island Cove" telephone exchange. Today with help from Government, the site the Museum displays local artifacts, photos donated by residents, including "tools and implements depicting the early lifestyles of our area".

The annual Lower Island Cove Regatta once competed for calendar dates with the Royal St. John's regatta. In the 1970s, the LIC Regatta faded away. However, in the 1980s, the Association for Youth and Leisure (AYLA) revived the regatta, which is now held during the second weekend of August. In 2008 the regatta at Lower Island Cove stopped due to no people to row. The AYLA now holds a "Fun Day", which consists of Games Of Chance Food and family fun, something similar to the Regatta but without the boat races.

In the Old Methodist Church Cemetery, a memorial stands to local 13 men who drowned on the schooner "Six Brothers", which left Lower Island Cove for Trinity Bay on May 25, 1883, never to return. The memorial is a reminder of the large number of men along the shore who have lost their lives to the sea.

In 2006, a Christmas tree farm was established. Since the closure of the Cod Fishery in 1992, while there has been some fish plant employment, there remains very little industry. Subsequently, the farm started out with 600 Fraser and Balsam Fir seedlings (9"-12" 2006) from Quebec, where the industry is quite lucrative. Nonetheless, the provincial government's Wooddale Tree Nursery, in Grand Falls, Newfoundland, began growing Fraser, Balsam and Bracken fir to provide future stock. Yearly, a large quantity of Christmas trees are imported to Newfoundland from nearby Nova Scotia. Christmas tree farming, therefore, marks a new industry for the province of Newfoundland and Labrador, as well as hope for the settlement.

== Low Point ==
48°03′36″N 52°57′24″W Low Point is an unincorporated town in Newfoundland and Labrador, Canada located on a spit of land overlooking a small bay called Bay de Verde Bight. Low Point is a fishing village that has experienced resettlement over a longer period as residents moved to larger areas.

- 1838 and 1848 – Hard times are experienced from fishery failures combined with crop failures.
- 1843 – A school is constructed.
- 1869 – The population is listed as 64.
- 1999 – 3 families in residence at Low Point.

== Northern Bay ==
See: Northern Bay, Newfoundland and Labrador

== Ochre Pit Cove ==
47°55′26″N 53°05′00″W

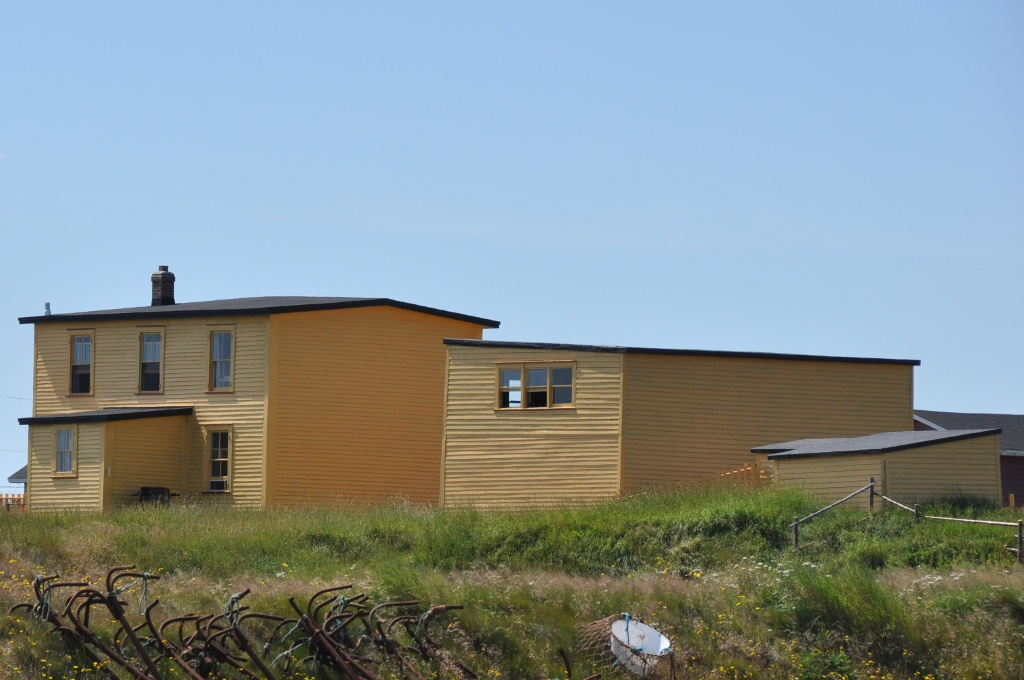
The Aubrey and Elizabeth Crowley Property in Ochre Pit Cove was built ca. 1910 and destroyed by the Kingston wildfire in 2025.

Ochre Pit Cove is located in Conception Bay in the Bay de Verde area.

The community derives its name from the red colour of its soil which is caused by its high iron content.

The area was originally inhabited by the Beothuk tribe.

The Beothuks of Ochre Pit Cove had an annual ochring ceremony. Once a year all members of the tribe received a new application of red ochre on the face and body.

The Post office was located in Carbonear around 1864. The first Waymaster in 1882 was Josiah Garlkand. In 1891 the first Postmistress was Bridget Perfect on May 30, 1891. It had a population of 158 in 1956.

The wharf at Ochre Pit Cove has some of the best anchoring facilities in the Conception Bay area. Because ships that were berthed at the harbour were exposed to wave agitation during storm conditions, the breakwater was extended in 2009.

On August 3, 2025, a wildfire broke out in the neighboring unincorporated town of Kingston. Early the next afternoon, evacuation orders were issued for both Kingston and Small Point-Adam's Cove-Blackhead-Broad Cove as the fire burned out of control, spreading north and south. The Kingston fire reached an estimated 2,200 ha (5,400 acres) by August 7 with the most active area located along its western edge. Premier Hogan announced evacuation orders on August 7 for Ochre Pit Cove and Salmon Cove. The Kingston fire was reported at 10,708 ha (26,460 acres) on August 19 and had destroyed 203 structures (59 in Ochre Pit Cove). On August 30, the fire was classified as under control and all evacuation orders were lifted.

== Red Head Cove ==
48°7.85′N 52°53.6′W Red Head Cove is a fishing village in Newfoundland and Labrador located near the tip of the Bay de Verde Peninsula separating Trinity Bay and Conception Bay, in a steep valley north of Bay de Verde. The cove provides very little shelter or level ground for building homes. To the north is a reddish colour headland, which gives the community its name. Red Head Cove provides the closest access to the prime fishing grounds of Baccalieu Tickle.

The settlement is mostly Roman Catholic. During the 1900s many of the nearby communities were increasing their involvement in the Labrador fishery, however, Red Head Cove remained primarily an inshore fishing community.

In 1954, brothers Morris Quinlan and Patrick Quinlan bought the business of James F. O'Neill of Bay de Verde and established Quinlan Brothers Limited. In due course, they built a relatively small ‘fish plant’ on the waterfront at Foreside. Even though fish had been caught and sold in a variety of ways since early settlement, this was the first fresh codfish processing operation in Bay de Verde. By the early 1960s, the salt cod industry had virtually come to an end and consequently, the ‘fish plant’ became the mainstay of the fishery in Bay de Verde. In time, along with cod, many other species were processed. After the cod moratorium of 1992 Quinlan Bros. turned their attention to the processing of snow crab and shrimp. With their base of operation in Bay de Verde, they are now one of the largest producers of these products in Newfoundland and Labrador. Many residents of Red Head Cove obtained employment at this fish plant or on the long-liner fleet at that port.

- 1817 – Local tradition has it that this year saw the arrival of the first year-round settler, Richard Hatch (or Hutch), who had visited the cove from Trinity in the past. Family names of other early settlers who probably used the Cove as a summer station before settlement include: Hyde, Quinlan and Rice.
- 1836 – Census reports two families at Red Head Cove with a total population of 14. These are the families of Hatch and Patrick Rice, who live on both sides of the Main River.
- 1845 – The population increases to 48.
- 1872 – A road is established between Red Head Cove, Bay de Verde and Old Perlican.
- 1874 – The population increases to 89. Three of these were born in Ireland.
- 1901 – The population is 174.
- 1935 – The population is 240.
- 1956 - The population is 195.
- 1980's – The inshore fishery is still the largest employer in Red Head Cove, but some residents leave as a result of the declining fish and crab stocks.
- 1992 – Most of the services are provided to Red Head Cove by the larger surrounding communities, including Old Perlican Cottage Hospital and a central high school located at Bay de Verde

== Western Bay ==
47°53′N 53°05′W

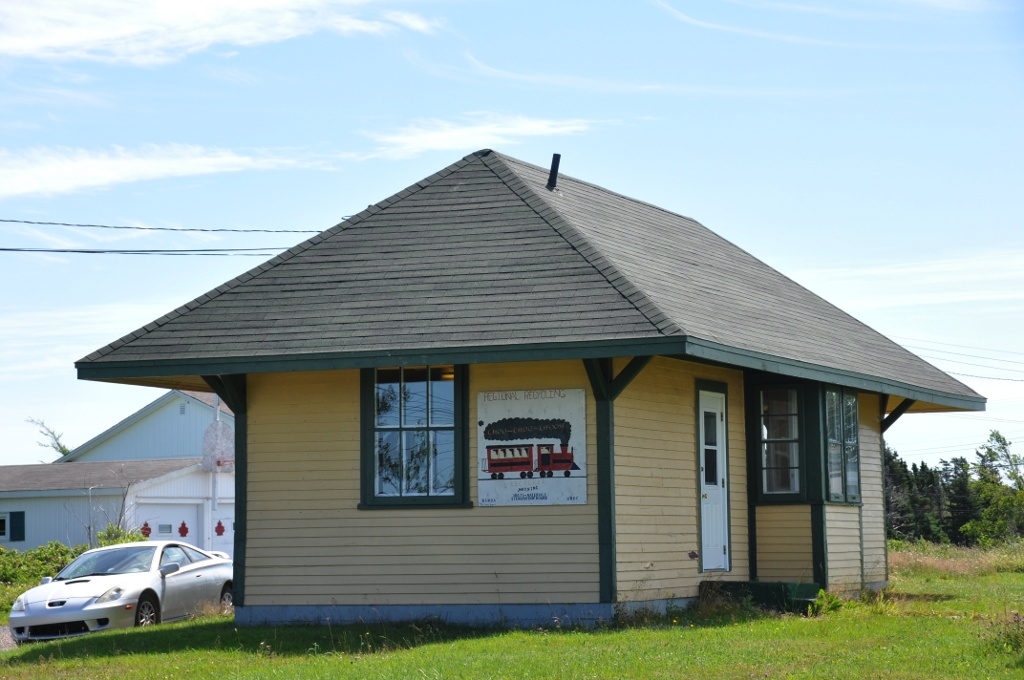
Western Bay railway station

Western Bay is a town in Conception Bay, about 13 miles (21 km) north of Carbonear. It was originally a farming and fishing settlement and was established as a Postal town in 1864. It had a population of 965 in 1901 and 508 in 1956. E. J. Pratt, who has been called "the foremost Canadian poet of the first half of the [twentieth] century" (The Canadian Encyclopedia), was born in Western Bay, where his father was a Methodist minister, on February 4, 1882.

=== Western Bay Railway Station Registered Heritage Structure ===
The Western Bay Railway Station is a one-storey wooden building with a low-pitched hipped roof, constructed in 1914 with large eaves extending out over the wooden porch, acting as a weather guard for passengers waiting at the station. It was designated by the Heritage Foundation of Newfoundland and Labrador on 4 June 1994.

=== 2025 wildfire ===
On August 3, 2025, a wildfire broke out in the neighboring unincorporated town of Kingston. Early the next afternoon, evacuation orders were issued for both Kingston and Small Point-Adam's Cove-Blackhead-Broad Cove as the fire burned out of control, spreading north and south. Western Bay was also ordered to evacuate at 11:30pm that night. The Kingston fire reached an estimated 2,200 ha (5,400 acres) by August 7 with the most active area located along its western edge. The fires in Western Bay continued to grow over the weekend of August 9. The Kingston fire grew to 8,019 ha (19,820 acres) by August 13 and had destroyed about 100 homes. On August 15, the Minister of Education confirmed that Cabot Academy elementary school in Western Bay was destroyed by the wildfire. The Kingston fire was reported at 10,708 ha (26,460 acres) on August 19 and had destroyed 203 structures (86 in Western Bay). On August 30, 2025, the Kingston fire was classified as under control and all evacuation orders were lifted.
