= Northern Bay =

Unincorporated community in Newfoundland and Labrador

Coordinates: 47°56′30″N 53°04′25″W

Northern Bay is a small community on the northern tip of Conception Bay on the Bay de Verde Peninsula, Subdivision 1G, Newfoundland and Labrador, Canada.

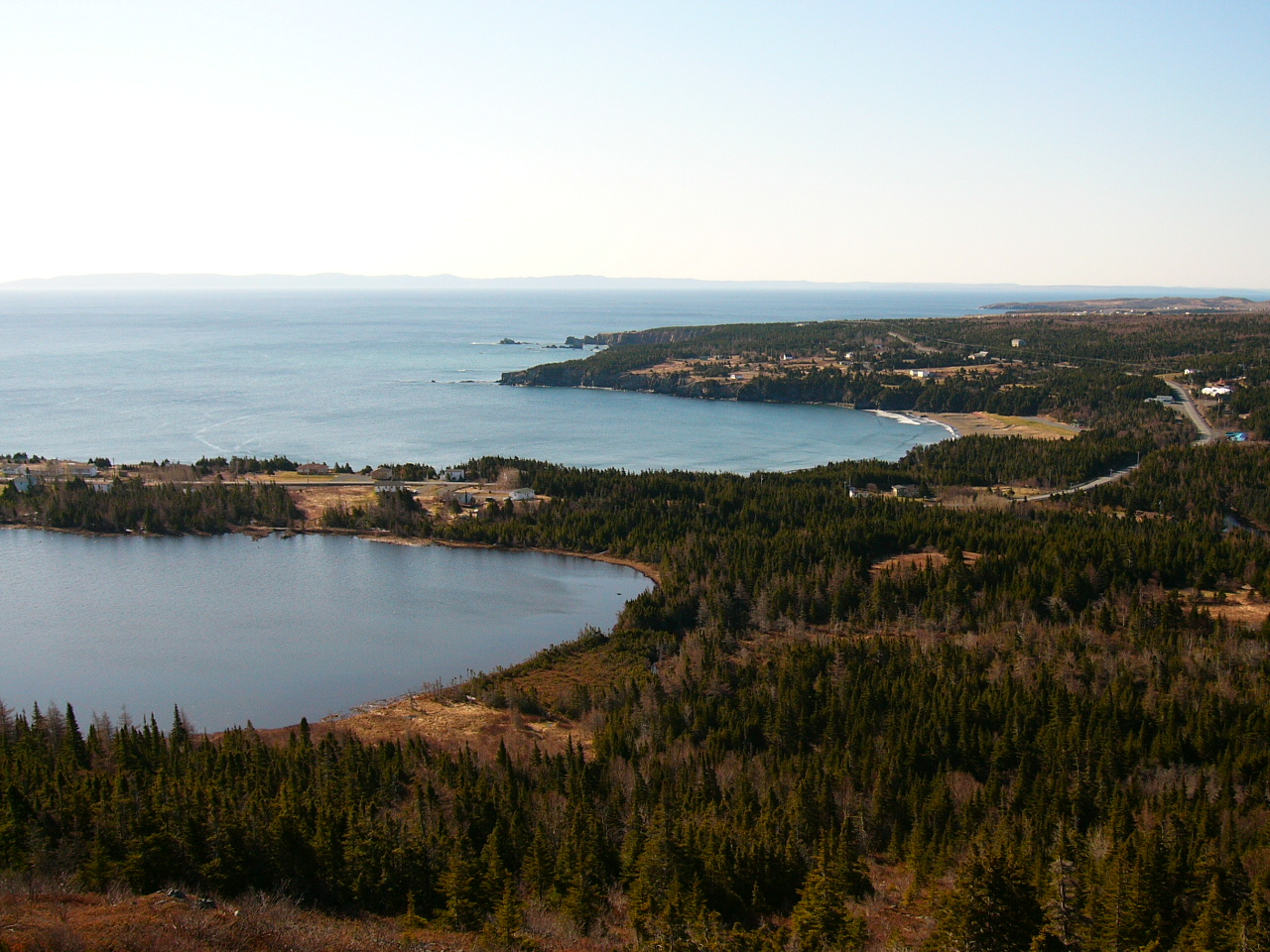
View of Northern Bay

== Location ==
Location of Northern Bay in Newfoundland

Northern Bay has roughly 290 permanent residents and is located between the neighbouring communities of Gull Island and Ochre Pit Cove on Route 70. It stretches from what is sometimes referred to as the "south side" of Northern Bay where the beach is located to what was once called the "Lower Rooms" which includes the former community of Long Beach.

== History ==
=== Early history ===
Fishing firms from England and Wales arrived at what is now Northern Bay as early as the mid-18th century. By 1768, immigrants from England and Ireland had settled the "North Shore" of Conception Bay, including Northern Bay.

On September 17, 1775, a ship carrying 400 passengers crashed somewhere near present-day Northern Bay. The crash was undoubtedly the result of the Newfoundland Hurricane of 1775 which remains one of the worst – if not the worst – natural disasters to have hit Newfoundland and Labrador in history.

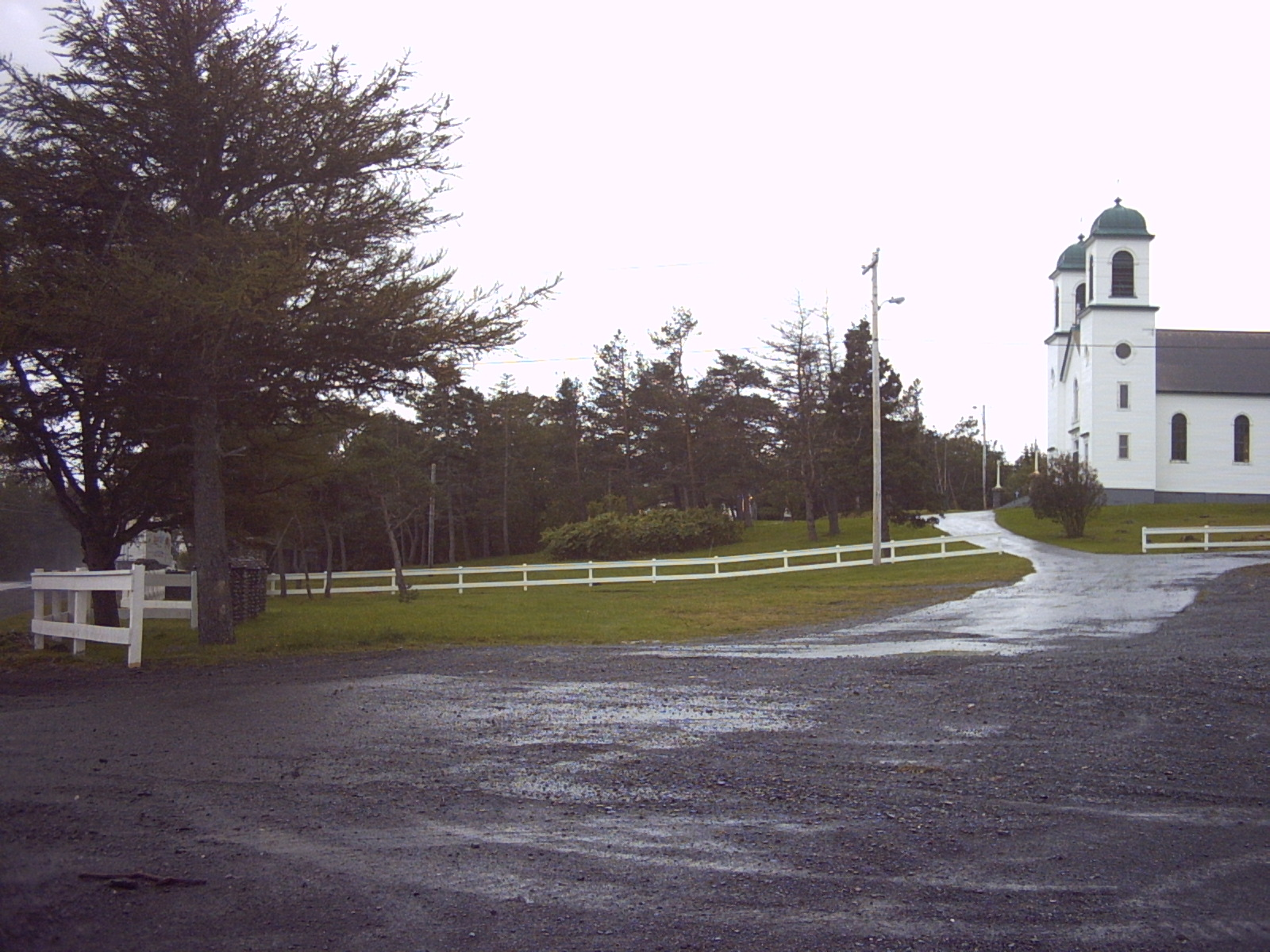
Corpus Christi Church Yard

In 1836, a Roman Catholic church (Corpus Christi Parish) was established in Northern Bay. A United Church also exists in the community. The population of the community in 1836 was 282.

One of the communities first settlers was William Hogan, an Irish merchant.

Since the 19th century, Northern Bay's population has remained relatively constant with some out-migration but a steady birthrate. The economy was mostly based on fishing and subsistence agriculture throughout the 19th and early 20th century.

A horse named after the area took part in the 1987 English Grand National Steeplechase, finishing the race in ninth place.

=== Folklore ===
Myths, legends and folklore were once very important in rural Newfoundland, but today are little more than entertainment.

One folk tale that continues in the culture of Northern Bay and the surrounding communities is that of "Hannah's Tolt". The following is from the old Newfoundland magazine Decks Wash (V.9, No.6, Dec.1980):

"The local word for a rocky hill is 'tolt' and there is an interesting story surrounding the origin of Hannah's Tolt, located inland from Northern Bay near Welsh's Pond. It occurred probably in the 1920s [or] 1930s. Late in the fall of the year when a crowd of women were in the woods berry-picking, Hannah Milley and her daughter must have been separated from the main group of women when a snowstorm suddenly broke out. They never made it back to the community. Search parties failed to turn up the bodies, but about 17 years later, a man named Lewis Crummey was in the woods partridge hunting and he found the two bodies and their rusted berry buckets down at the base of a tolt, which was then nicknamed Hannah's Tolt."

=== 2025 Wildfires ===
On August 3, 2025, a wildfire broke out in the neighboring unincorporated town of Kingston. Early the next afternoon, evacuation orders were issued for both Kingston and Small Point-Adam's Cove-Blackhead-Broad Cove as the fire burned out of control, spreading north and south. The Kingston fire reached an estimated 2,200 ha (5,400 acres) by August 7 with the most active area located along its western edge. The Kingston fire grew to 8,019 ha (19,820 acres) by August 13 and had destroyed about 100 homes. The Kingston fire was reported at 10,708 ha (26,460 acres) on August 19 and had destroyed 203 structures (13 in Northern Bay). On August 30, 2025, the Kingston fire was classified as under control and all evacuation orders were lifted.

== Economy and society today ==
=== Economy ===
The local economy is based on fishing, fish and crab processing plants in nearby communities, some local small businesses, and Northern Bay Sands which was a provincial park until privatization in 1997. Unemployment is high however due to the cod moratorium of 1992.

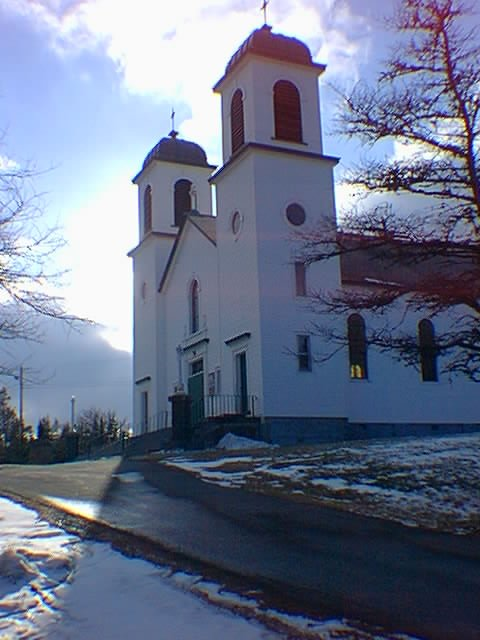
Corpus Christi Church (Winter 2002)

=== Education ===
During the 20th century, Northern Bay had one school which served all the neighbouring communities from Caplin Cove through Kingston. Corpus Christi Elementary and High School in Northern Bay catered predominantly to Roman Catholic Students in the area and Jackson Walsh Elementary and High School in nearby Western Bay was an interfaith school. The referendum of 1997 which put an end to denominational education in Newfoundland and Labrador's public schools meant that the school in Northern Bay (which was renamed North Shore Collegiate) became the high school for all students in the area, and Jackson Walsh (renamed Cabot Academy) would become the elementary school serving the area.

In 2002, North Shore Collegiate closed as a result of a declining student population. The closing of the high school meant that all students from grades 7 through 12 from Northern Bay and the surrounding communities would have to attend school in either Old Perlican to the north or Carbonear further south.

The closing of the school has left an indelible impression on local life, particularly as it was also a centre for community gatherings and a symbol of growth and autonomy for not only Northern Bay but the entire North Shore region.

=== Tourism ===
The community is a popular site for tourists in the summer season due to Northern Bay Sands, a popular beach and campground. The close proximity to major centres on the Avalon Peninsula such as St. John's, Carbonear, and Bay Roberts has made Northern Bay a particularly well-known summer get-away spot.

=== Politics ===
The community is not incorporated as a municipality but its citizens are active in local organizations such as school boards, church groups or the North Shore Regional Fire Department.

Northern Bay is in the provincial riding of Carbonear-Trinity-Bay de Verde, represented by PC MHA Riley Balsom and the federal electoral district of Avalon represented by Liberal MP Paul Connors.

== Towns and communities nearby ==
- Job's Cove
- Burnt Point
- Gull Island
- Ochre Pit Cove
- Western Bay

== See also ==
- Avalon Peninsula
- List of communities in Newfoundland and Labrador
- Northern Bay Sands
