= Elmer Harris =

Elmer Harris may refer to:

- Elmer Beseler Harris (1939–2019), American businessman and politician
- Elmer Frank Harris (born 1939), Newfoundland broadcasting personality and philanthropist
- Elmer Blaney Harris (1878–1966), American playwright and author

== See also ==
- Elmore Harris (1855–1911), Canadian Baptist minister
