= Bessler =

Bessler is a surname. Notable people with the surname include:

- Albert Bessler (1905–1975), German film actor
- Bernardo Bessler (born 1954), Brazilian violinist, conductor, teacher and producer
- Johann Bessler (1680–1745), German entrepreneur
- John Bessler (born 1967), American attorney and academic
- Karl Alfons Bessler von Wattingen (1734–1784), Swiss politician
- Marc Bessler, American bariatric surgeon
- Phil Bessler (1913–1995), Canadian hockey player

== See also ==
- Besler (disambiguation)
- Beseler
