= Bay de Verde =

- Town
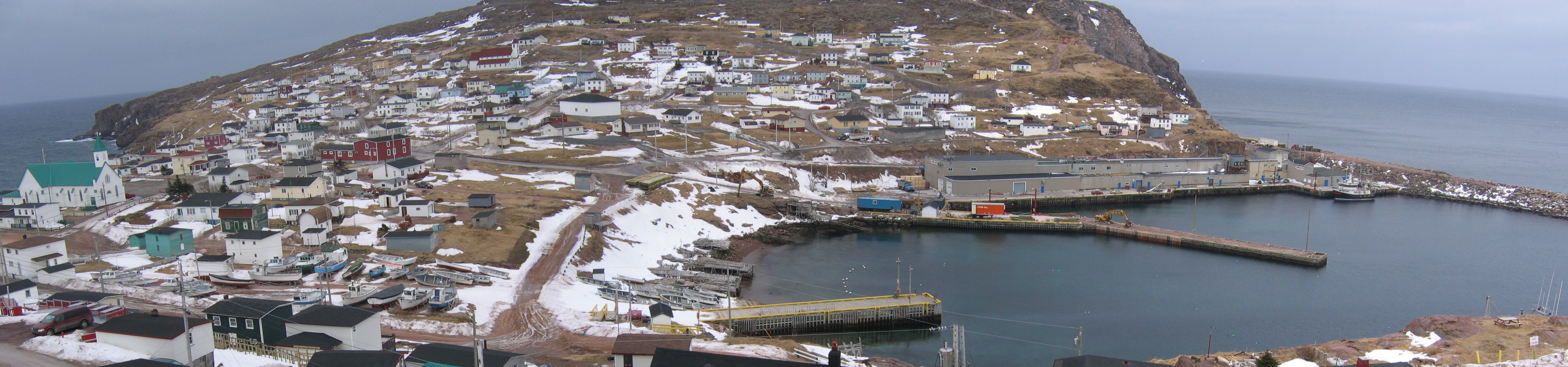
- Panoramic view overlooking harbour and community, March, 2007

- Coat of arms

- Location of Bay de Verde in Newfoundland
- Coordinates: 48°05′00″N 52°53′40″W
- Country: Canada
- Province: Newfoundland and Labrador
- Census division: 1
- Settled: 1662
- Incorporated (town): August 22, 1950

Government
  - Mayor: Gerard Murphy
  - MHA: Riley Balsom (Carbonear-Trinity-Bay de Verde)
  - MP: Jonathan Rowe (Terra Nova-The Peninsulas)

Area
  - Land: 13.28 km^{2} (5.13 sq mi)
- Elevation: 30 m (98 ft)

Population (2021)
  - Total: 347
  - Density: 29.5/km^{2} (76/sq mi)
- Time zone: UTC-3:30 (Newfoundland Standard)
  - Summer (DST): UTC-2:30 (Newfoundland Daylight)
- Postal code span: A0A-1E0
- Area code: 709
- Highways: Route 70
- Website: baydeverde.com

Bay de Verde (2021 population: 347) is an incorporated town in Conception Bay on the northern tip of the Bay de Verde Peninsula of Newfoundland and Labrador, Canada. The first recorded inhabitants at Bay de Verde arrived in 1662. Bay de Verde became an incorporated town in 1950.

== Geography ==
Bay de Verde is the northernmost community in Conception Bay. The central part of this picturesque fishing village is nestled between two hills, while on both sides the low-lying area gently slopes towards the ocean. On the southwestern side is the harbour, called the foreside, where fishing boats are moored in the central section away from the land and wharfs and at one time away from the fishing stages. The other side of this low-lying area, called the backside, was once also used for fishing stages, called fishing rooms, where boats were also moored away from the land. Due to its more treacherous rocks and steep slopes and its exposure to the raging sea and winds of the North Atlantic, backside has long been abandoned as an area for fishing rooms.

Bay de Verde and surrounding areas are barren of any trees except for a small grove of rugged spruce trees called the minister's grove. This is where the manse of the Minister of the local parish was built.

On the western side of the harbour just below an area called Spring Hill is the section of Torquay, which derives its name from an English town by the same name.

Bay de Verde is accessible by Route 70 of the provincial road system. The road down to the heart of the town is very steep and can be very dangerous in the winter during snow storms.

Split Point, a prolific fishing berth in the community, is also the boundary line between Conception Bay and Cape St. Francis.

=== Towns and communities nearby ===
Bay de Verde and surrounding areas are dotted by small fishing communities established to be close to the fishing grounds. Some of the communities within a 15-minute driving distance from Bay de Verde are:

- Red Head Cove
- Grates Cove
- Daniel's Cove
- Old Perlican
- Low Point
- Caplin Cove

=== Climate ===
The climate of the Atlantic Ocean and adjacent land areas is influenced by the temperatures of the surface waters and water currents as well as the winds blowing across the waters. Because of the oceans' great capacity for retaining heat, the climate of Bay de Verde is moderate and free of extreme seasonal variations. Precipitation falls on the area both as snow in the wintertime and moderate rainfall in summer. The Gulf Stream and Labrador Current converge just off the coast of Newfoundland and provide for very dense fog that can linger in the area for days. Snow can accumulate with prolonged periods of snowfall which was the case in the winter of 2000–2001.

== History ==
According to D. W. Prowse (1895) the earliest documented inhabitant of the 'Bay of Arbs' (today known as Bay de Verde) was Isaac Dethick, an English planter who was expelled from Placentia in 1662 when the French took over that town. There is no doubt that there were settlers such as the Taverners already established at Bay de Verde when he arrived. In 1675 seven families and their servants, numbering close to 150 people, had erected eleven rooms and stages in the harbour.

The best record of the period comes from the journal of Abbe Baudoin, dated February 2 to February 6, 1697. Baudoin, who travelled with Pierre Le Moyne d'Iberville's raiders, noted that "there were in this harbour fourteen settlers well established and ninety good men." During King William's War, the village was destroyed in the Avalon Peninsula Campaign. These French raiding parties destroyed the community and killed a number of inhabitants again during Queen Anne's War in 1705.

One of the early family names of Bay de Verde is Taverner. According to H. F. Shortis (1910) William Taverner was a naval officer and surveyor on a British man-of-war who later worked on a Newfoundland map of 1745.

The main road in Bay de Verde is Masters Road named after John Masters, apprenticed to William Taverner about 1700–1701. The Taverner family of Poole and Bay de Verde – a moderately well-off group which divided its time between Poole and Newfoundland.

Abraham, William Taverner's brother, an obscure figure, was the Newfoundland agent for the London merchant, James Campbell, who had extensive plantations at Bay de Verde. Campbell was financial agent in London for Captain John Moody who had been commander of the Newfoundland garrison during Major Thomas Lloyd's absence in 1704–1705 and who was an avowed adversary of Lloyd. Although many of the Newfoundland planters tried to keep away from both Lloyd and Moody, William Taverner led a group which, early in 1708, complained about Lloyd's exploitation of the colonists.

=== 17th century ===
- 1612 - October 1612 Bartholomew Pearson, yeoman of Wollaton, Nottingham, settler in the first English colony in Newfoundland, took part in John Guy's expedition to Trinity Bay and was among those ship-wrecked at Green Bay (Bay de Verde) on the way back. Nine days later, near starvation, they regained Cuper's Cove (now Cupids), having walked to Carbonear where they had found a boat. Pearson was one of a group of settlers who went to Cuper's Cove in 1612. His task was to assess the agricultural possibilities of Newfoundland to only condemned both the land and the climate after a few months there. This expedition was financed by Sir Percival Willoughby, a prominent member of the Merchant Venturers company formed in 1610 for the plantation of Newfoundland.
- 1628 - Sir David Kirke Governor of Newfoundland encouraged British settlement in Newfoundland, collected a five per cent tax on all fish and oil taken by foreign fishermen, and fortified the choice spots of Ferryland, St. John's and Bay de Verde.
- 1662 – Isaac Dethick settled at Bay de Verde after being deported from Placentia by the newly arrived French garrison.
- 1675 – There are seven families and their servants, numbering about 150 people total, occupying 11 rooms and stages in the harbour at this time.
- 1677 – Bay de Verde fishery produces 1,700 quintals of fish.
- 1693 – Bay de Verde fishery produces 4,450 quintals of fish.
- 1697 – The journal of Abbe Baudoin noted that "there were in this harbour fourteen settlers well established and ninety good men".

=== 18th century ===
- 1714 – William Taverner, born at Bay de Verde, surveys the south coast of Newfoundland for the English crown.
- 1729 – Bay de Verde becomes one of the six judicial districts created by Governor Henry Osborn, in order to protect life liberty and property. These districts were responsible for the erection of stocks and the administration of flogging for minor crimes.
- 1738 - Seventeen ships are engaged in the cod fishery.

=== 19th century ===
- 1804 - George Garland establishes a trading post.
- 1811 - 20+ individuals had disembarked the schooner Fanny at Bay de Verde due to the deplorable conditions they endured in the voyage from Ireland to Newfoundland. On September 3, 1811 James Lannon, master of the schooner Fanny, appeared in court at St. John's to answer to the charge of not providing water and food for the crew and passengers. They left Waterford, Ireland on April 23, 1811 for St. John's. The schooner was greatly overcrowded with 184 passengers and twelve crew. John Lynch who appeared as a witness paid 6 guineas for his passage told how they only received a quart of water a day during his voyage and for the last week of their voyage only received half pint of water a day.
- 1823 – Newfoundland School Society under the direction of Samuel Codner establishes its first free school.
- 1832 – John Lynch is teaching school in the cooper shop of Timothy Dineen at Bay de Verde.
- 1838 – Northern Bay Roman Catholic Parish is established and Father Bernard Duffy begins his ministry covering all of the North Shore including Bay de Verde .
- 1839 – First Church of England denominational school is established by the Newfoundland School Society and run by William Pippy..
- 1841 - Church of England wardens James Norris and William Barter establish the Anglican Parish.
- 1843 – School master John Morrissey begins a Roman Catholic denominational school.
- 1846 – Reverend John Roberts is appointed to the Church of England mission of Grates Cove – Bay de Verde.
- 1847 – Oliver Rouse arrives to take over the Anglican Parish and its missions.
- 1870 – The newly constituted Road Board begins to establish roads.
- 1872 – Road completed to Red Head Cove, Grates Cove and Old Perlican.
- 1873 - James Ryan of Bonavista, owner of James Ryan and Company establishes a trading operation at Bay de Verde.
- 1880 – Roman Catholic Parish of the Assumption established with Reverend Gregory Battcock as priest.
- 1881 – First telegraph line from Carbonear to Bay de Verde.
- 1891 – St. Barnabas Anglican Church completed.
- 1892 – Construction began on Assumption Parish Roman Catholic Church.

=== 20th century ===
- 1902 – Thomas Moore begins to operate one of the first lobster canning plants in the community.
- 1911 – Fisherman's Protective Union store is open.
- 1916 – Railway Branch Line from Carbonear to Bay de Verde is completed.
- 1929 – Electricity is turned on for the first time. Power is supplied from the United Township Electric Company.
- 1932 – Railway branch line is shut down.
- 1942 – First breakwater built at Emberley's Point.
- 1943 – Silas "Si" Moores purchases property on the waterfront and begins fish processing.
- 1946 – The Fisherman's Co-operative Society is established.
- 1947 – Duncan Blundon builds his forge for manufacture of trap grapples and other metal works.
- 1948 – First cod liver reducing plant built.
- 1949 – Liver plant catches on fire and explosions can be heard throughout the night as 50 gallon drums are burned and exploded.
- 1950 – Patrick Noonan becomes the first mayor of Bay de Verde's Town Council, which was established in July to provide services, including a municipal water supply system. Council rendered inactive in the next year.
- 1953 – Fish processing/cold storage plant built by "Si" Moores, replacing old Moores store. Plant is operated each season until 1965 by North Eastern Fish Industries Limited (Moores's company).
- 1954 – Maurice and Patrick Quinlan buy out the business of James F. O'Neill.
- 1955 – The Ice house is demolished to give way to slipway and winch to haul boats onto dry land in fall for winter storage.
- 1958 – Ice house dismantled.
- 1962 – "Si" Moores dies, leaving the fish plant in the possession of his son, Frank Moores.
- 1965 – Birds Eye Foods Limited purchases 51% share of North Eastern Fish Industries Limited from the Moores family.
- 1967 – St. Joseph's Central High School opens.
- 1968 – Birds Eye/North Eastern Fish Industries Limited cease operations and the Moores family sells the plant to Quinlan Brothers when Frank Moores decides to enter federal politics. At that time the plant employed over 300 people from Bay de Verde and surrounding communities. Quinlan Brothers continue cod and turbot processing at the plant with a fleet consisting of six of the twelve longliners fishing from the community.
- 1972 – Tricon Elementary School opens.
- 1975 – Town Council reactivated after twenty-five years of dormancy.
- 1992 – Cod fishery is closed down by the Federal Government of Canada. Crab and shrimp fishery continues to be successful at Bay de Verde.
- 1999 – Bay de Verde Heritage House and Baccalieu Island Exhibit officially opened.

=== 21st century ===
- 2002 - St. Joseph's Central High School closes.
- 2004 - Bay de Verde wins 'TIDY TOWNS AWARD'
- 2016 - Quinlan's Fish Plant burned down April 11, leaving about 700 unemployed.
- 2017 - Quinlan Brothers Seafood Processing Plant re-opens.

=== Shipwrecks ===
- the longliner Mainlander owned by Gordon Tweed, uncle of Shannon Tweed.

== Demographics ==
In the 2021 Census of Population conducted by Statistics Canada, Bay de Verde had a population of 347 living in 157 of its 200 total private dwellings, a change of −11.5% from its 2016 population of 392. With a land area of 13.24 km^{2} (5.11 sq mi), it had a population density of 26.2/km^{2} (67.9/sq mi) in 2021.

2016 census
Total Population	392
Population change from 2011	-1.5%
Median age	55.4
Number of families	130
Number of married couples	190
Total number of dwellings	216
Total Land Area	13.28 km^{2}

== Economy ==
Bay de Verde today is a prominent fishing community located on the northern tip of the Bay de Verde Peninsula of Conception Bay near Baccalieu Island.

== Tourist attractions ==
- Heritage Premises (Blundon House) and Baccalieu Island Exhibit
- The Bay de Verde Heritage House is a merchant-class Victorian house built in 1896 which features many exhibits, including one on the Baccalieu Island Bird Sanctuary.
- Active Fishing Community with a major crab plant
- Two Historic Churches, Roman Catholic and Anglican (Over 100 years old)
- Baccalieu Island Ecological Reserve. Seabird Colony
- Scenic view of beautiful Conception Bay
- Iceberg viewing and Whale Watching (humpbacks, minkes, etc.)
- Lazy Rock Hiking Trail. Groomed and maintained hiking trail. 3k
- Boat Tour
- Crab Plant Tour (in season)
- Many picnic tables

== Notable people ==
- D'Arcy Broderick Singer and musician (born Bay de Verde)
- William James Emberley fisherman and songwriter (born Bay de Verde)
- Paul O'Neill C.M. Order of Canada, writer, producer (born St. John's, lived in Bay de Verde)
- William Taverner Planter, trader, surveyor (born Bay de Verde)
- Frank Moore Actor (born Bay de Verde)

== See also ==
- List of municipalities in Newfoundland and Labrador
