= Bay de Verde Branch Line =

Section of the Newfoundland Railway

Newfoundland Railway (Bay de Verde Branch Line)
Overview
- Headquarters: Carbonear
- Locale: Conception Bay North, Newfoundland
- Dates of operation: 1916–1932

Technical
- Track gauge: 3 ft 6 in (1,067 mm)

The Bay de Verde Branch Line was a section of the Newfoundland Railway that finished construction in 1916. The line ran from Carbonear to Bay de Verde.

== History ==
The Carbonear railway station was upgraded and expanded due to the construction of the line in 1917. The line also passed through communities such as Victoria and Western Bay. Victoria had the distinction of being the only community in Newfoundland that had 3 Railway Stations, one for Freshwater, one for central Victoria and one for Salmon Cove. From 1898 - 1901 an iron ore mine was operated out of Lower Island by the Workington Railway. The railway line ran from the mine in Lower Island Cove to a port in Old Perlican. The mine was shut down in 1901 after the iron ore depleted. Much of the Workington Railway line was repurposed in the construction of the Bay de Verde Branch Line. After several years of operation under the Reid Newfoundland Company, the line was shut down due to lack of funding in 1932. The narrow gauge branch line was soon torn up. Only the trails, a few trestles and two railway stations in Western Bay and Carbonear remain.

=== Recent ===
In 2020, the CBN T'Railway Association began upgrading the abandoned railway line for multipurpose use (ATV, hiking, horseback riding). Restoration began on several trestles, brush cutting and trail grading took place, as well as garbage cleanup.
