= Besler =

Besler may refer to:

== People ==
- Basilius Besler (1561–1629), German apothecary and botanist
- Berkay Besler (born 1999), Turkish racing driver
- George Besler (1902–1994), American steam power entrepreneur in the 1930s and 1940s, son of William George Besler
- Igor Bezler (born 1965), pro-Russian rebel in Ukraine
- Matt Besler (born 1987), American soccer player
- Nick Besler (born 1993), American soccer player, younger brother of Matt Besler
- Peter Besler (born 1963), American investment advisor and author
- Samuel Besler (1574–1625), German-Polish composer
- William Besler (1904–1985), American steam power entrepreneur in the 1930s and 1940s, son of William George Besler
- William George Besler (1865–1942), American railroad manager

== Other ==
- Besler (mountain)

== See also ==
- Bessler
- Beseler
