= Victoria, Newfoundland and Labrador =

Victoria Victoria Village
- Town
- Nicknames: The Village, The Savage Hollar
- Location of Victoria in Newfoundland
- Coordinates: 47°46′03″N 53°14′28″W
- Country: Canada
- Province: Newfoundland and Labrador
- Incorporated (town): 1971

Government
  - Mayor: Sharon Penney
  - Deputy Mayor: Kelly Loch
  - MHA: Riley Balsom
  - MP: Paul Connors

Area
  - Total: 17.64 km^{2} (6.81 sq mi)

Population (2021)
  - Total: 1,658
  - Density: 93.99/km^{2} (243.4/sq mi)
- Time zone: UTC-3:30 (Newfoundland Time)
  - Summer (DST): UTC-2:30 (Newfoundland Daylight)
- Area code: 709
- Highways: Route 70; Route 74

Victoria is a landlocked town on the Avalon Peninsula in Newfoundland and Labrador, Canada, located approximately midway on the Bay de Verde Peninsula portion of the Avalon Peninsula.

== Geography ==
Victoria, located on Route 70, is often referred to as the "crossroads to Trinity and Conception Bays." Victoria may have been named after the Queen.

== Towns and communities nearby ==
Dotted around Victoria and surrounding areas are small fishing communities that were established due to the proximity of each community to the fishing grounds. Locally, Victoria goes by many nicknames, including "The Village" and "The Savage Hollar", although the use of these names has decreased in recent years. Among the communities within 15-minutes' driving distance from Victoria are:

- Perry's Cove
- Salmon Cove
- Freshwater
- Carbonear
- Bristol's Hope

== History ==
=== 19th century ===
- 1817 – Victoria is being used as a source of lumber and firewood.
- 1800s – Many residents of Victoria sign on for the Labrador Fishery with merchants in Carbonear, Harbour Grace and Northern Bay.

=== 20th century ===
- 1900s (early) – Other people find employment in lumbering, the railway and mining at Bell Island and Cape Breton.
- 1905 – An electric power station is running in the community.
- 1916 — Railway service on the Bay de Verde Branch Line is opened.
- 1921 – Sawmills are affected when a forest fire destroys much of the timber in the area. Nicholas Powell and Reuben, William and Nicholas Clarke are the merchants in Victoria.
- 1924 – An independent congregation (later joins the Pentecostal Assemblies of Newfoundland) is established by Victoria native Eugene Vaters.
- 1932 — Railway service is shut down.
- 1935 - The Pentecostal Assemblies of Newfoundland has more than 300 members in Victoria. Twenty-eight families from Victoria, take part in a land settlement program and move to Markland.
- 1985 – Victoria Electrical Museum is opened.

=== 2025 council dismissal ===
On December 17, 2025, Chris Tibbs, Minister of Municipal Affairs, dismissed the entire 7 member council. The council meeting on the 16th showed a large level of in-fighting, mismanagement, and emotional outbursts; this meeting was cited as being one of the reasons for the councils dismissal. The same day of the dismissal, Christopher Stamp, the Department of Municipal Affairs Director of Municipal Support, was appointed as Town Administrator. He will serve this role until a date can be set for a future municipal election. No member of the ousted council is bared from running in the future election.

On March 27, 2026, it was announced an election would take place on May 14 to elect a new council.

== Economy ==
Industries / Economic Activity

- Agriculture - growing vegetables, hay, and raising cattle
- Forestry - sawmill
- Manufacturing/Retail - making barrels, tubs and wine barrels at the local cooperage located in the heritage park
- Construction - Home builders

== Climate ==
The climate of the Atlantic Ocean and adjacent land areas is influenced by the temperatures of the surface waters and water currents as well as the winds blowing across the waters. Because of the oceans' great capacity for retaining heat, the climate of Victoria are moderate and free of extreme seasonal variations.

Precipitation falls on the area both as snow in the wintertime and moderate rainfall in summer.

The Gulf Stream and Labrador Current converge just off the coast of Newfoundland and provide for very dense fog that can linger in the area for days.

== Demographics ==
In the 2021 Census of Population conducted by Statistics Canada, Victoria had a population of 1,658 living in 712 of its 822 total private dwellings, a change of −7.9% from its 2016 population of 1,800. With a land area of 17.96 km^{2} (6.93 sq mi), it had a population density of 92.3/km^{2} (239.1/sq mi) in 2021.

== Tourist attractions ==
- Victoria Hydro Electric Museum
- Victoria Lifestyles Museum
- Victoria Heritage Village

== See also ==
- List of cities and towns in Newfoundland and Labrador
- Royal eponyms in Canada
- Bay de Verde Peninsula
