= Caplin Cove =

- Community
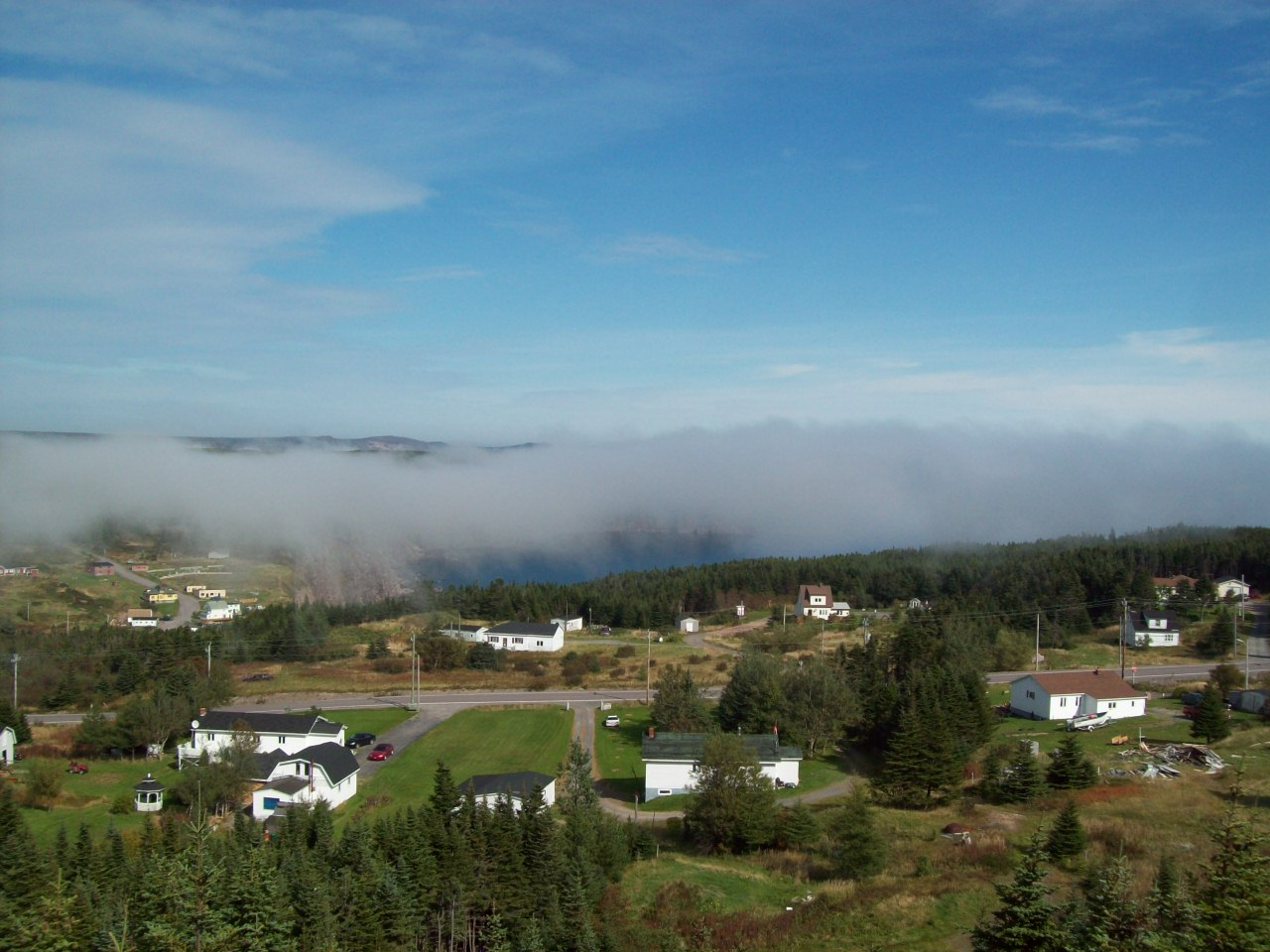
- Overlooking the Main Road, Community Of Caplin Cove

- Location of Caplin Cove in Newfoundland
- Coordinates: 48°02′40″N 52°59′30″W
- Country: Canada
- Province: Newfoundland and Labrador
- Census division: Division 1
- Census subdivision: Subdivision G
- Settled: Early 1700s

Population (2010)– This population is decreasing due to the out movement of people.
  - Total: About 130 residents
- Time zone: UTC– 3:30 (Newfoundland Time)
  - Summer (DST): UTC– 2:30 (Newfoundland Daylight)
- Postal code: A0A-1R0
- Area code: 709
- Highways: Route 70
- Website: http://www.caplincove.ca/

Caplin Cove (/ˈkeɪplɪn/ KAY-plin) is a small community on the north shore of Conception Bay, Newfoundland and Labrador, Canada. It is surrounded on the north by Low Point near the end of the Bay de Verde Peninsula, and on the south by Lower Island Cove. Caplin Cove was probably named for the large number of capelin (also called caplin) in its waters.

== History ==
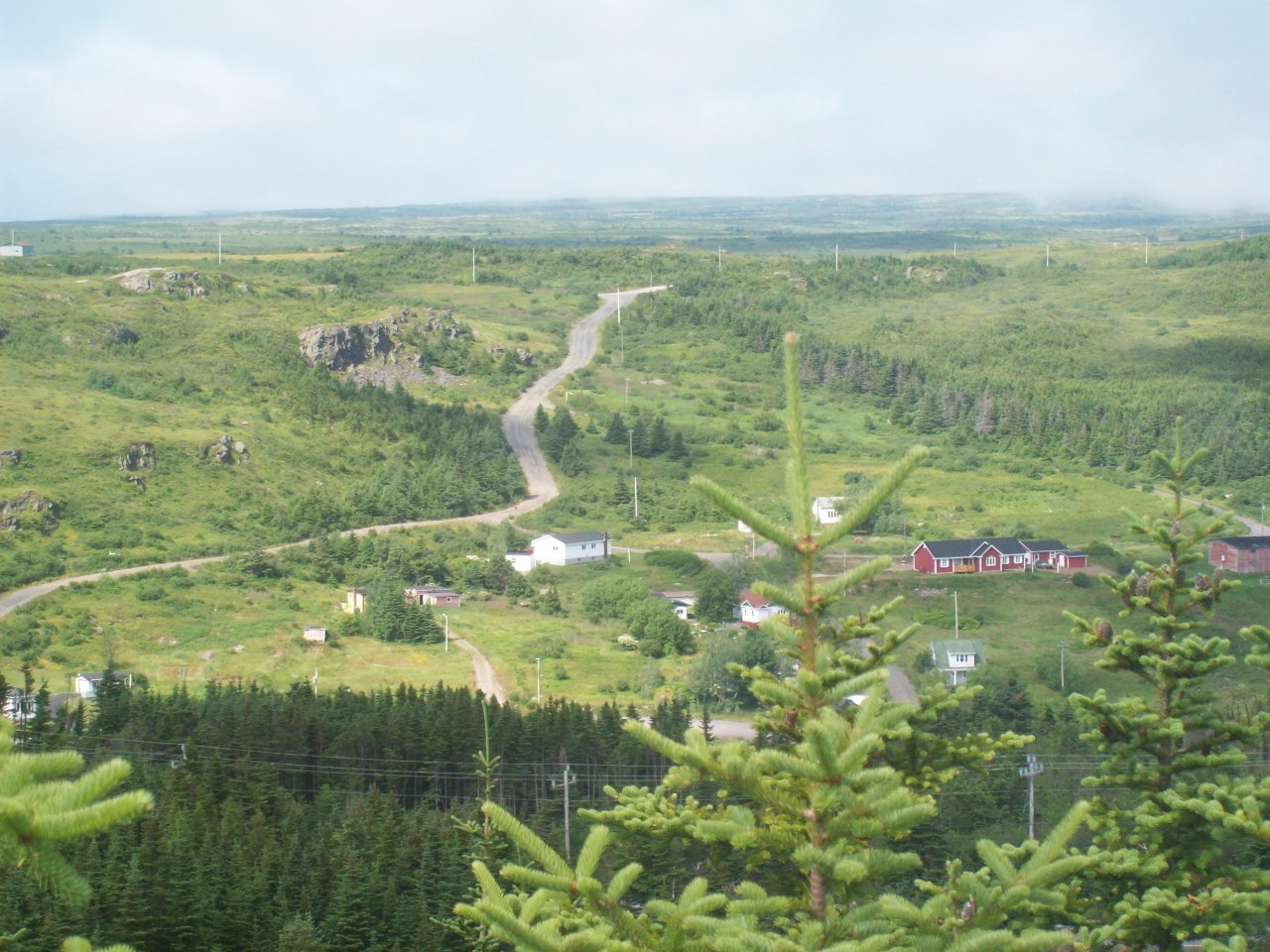
Lower end of Caplin Cove

Caplin Cove used to be a small fishing community, which had its own integrated elementary school, accommodating the community's Anglican, United, and Salvation Army students. The growth of service centres combined with the harsh environment of Conception Bay contributed to the decline in population of Caplin Cove. The growth of the fresh frozen fish industry, nearby seafood processing plants, improved roads, and new educational facilities contributed to Caplin Cove's survival.

== Timeline ==
- 1700s – Caplin Cove is first of the last settled by English fishermen.
- 1836 – Census reports a population of 44, most of whom are fishing servants.
- Mid-19th century – Several families from Freshwater and Carbonear are settled in Caplin Cove.
- 1871 – Lovell's Newfoundland Dictionary reports 2 planters, George Cull And Michael Power, and fishermen Bussey, Stephen Compton, George Garland, Robert Keats, Charles, Job, John and Urias Reynolds, and Jacob, James and Peter Snelgrove
- 1935 – The population is 202.
- 1950s – Decline in cod fishery and the depression causes some families to leave the community
- 1951 – Population is reduced to 188, 28 of which are fishermen and 20 are labourers.
- 1973 – To improve shore facilities, a haul-up and landing block are built.
- 1980 – The small boat inshore cod fishery remained the main employment in this community, which in 1980 reported 22 full-time fisherman in 6 crews who drew each season for the traditional berths. During the fishing season, approximately 11,000 pounds of cod per week are hauled and trucked to the plants in Conception Bay. Squid is caught and shipped to Dildo.
- 1961 – High school students attend school in nearby Western Bay.
- 1972 – Elementary school students attend school in Western Bay.
- 1992 – High School and Elementary students attended school in Bay de Verde and Western Bay.
- 1997 – High school students attend school in nearby Northern Bay and elementary students attend school in Western Bay.
- 2005–Present Day – Elementary students attend school in Western Bay and Bay De Verde. While High School students attend school in Old Perlican. In 2025, Cabot Academy elementary school in Western Bay was destroyed by the wildfire.

== Geography ==
The community of Caplin Cove for the most part is on gently sloping area much higher than the coast where the majority of the buildings have been built. A road which follows a brook runs from east to west and slopes to sea level to a beach below. The Brook which stretches from the far reaches of the boundaries which runs from west to east, fed by many deep and shallow watered ponds, spotted around the region, drains into the ocean slightly dividing the community in two. Caplin Cove also consists of many natural underground fresh water springs. It is a moderately wooded area consisting of primarily balsam fir trees.

== Towns and communities nearby ==
- Bay de Verde
- Low Point
- Lower Island Cove
- Old Perlican

== See also ==
- List of communities in Newfoundland and Labrador
- Avalon Peninsula
