= Grates Cove, Newfoundland and Labrador =

Coordinates: 48°09′43″N 52°56′04″W

Grates Cove
- Local service district / designated place
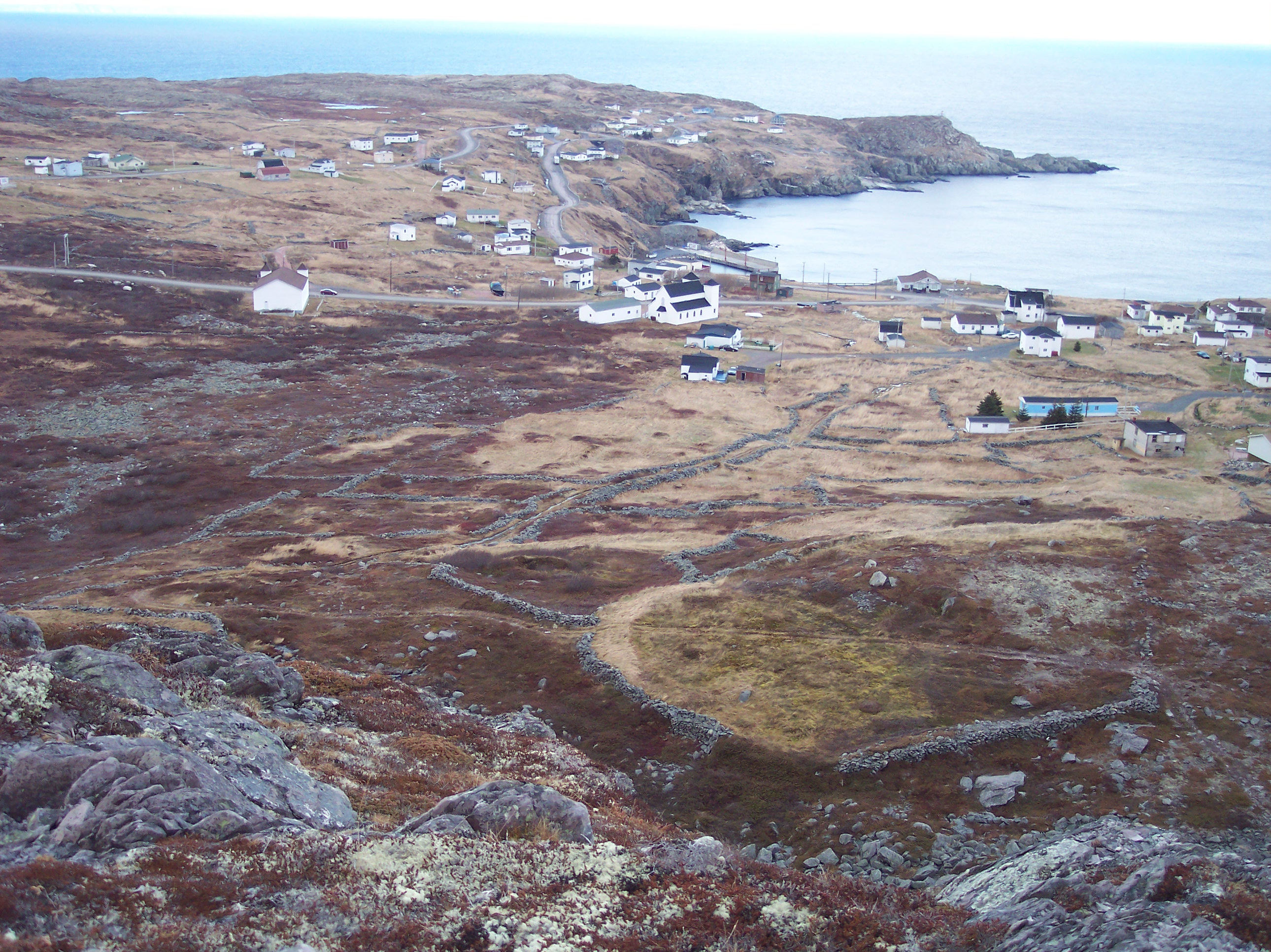
- Interactive map of Grates Cove
- Country: Canada
- Province: Newfoundland and Labrador
- Census division: Division 1
- Census subdivision: Subdivision G

Population (2021)
  - Total: 180
- Time zone: UTC-3:30 (Newfoundland Time)
  - Summer (DST): UTC-2:30 (Newfoundland Daylight)
- Area code: 709
- Highways: Grates Cove Road to Route 70

Grates Cove is a local service district and designated place in the Canadian province of Newfoundland and Labrador. It is the most northerly community on the Avalon Peninsula, located on the tip of the Bay de Verde Peninsula on the island of Newfoundland. Called "the Grates" by John Guy as early as 1612, the origin of the name is unknown.

== History ==
Grates Cove was first settled in 1790 by four families from Lower Island Cove and one family from Old Perlican. It is believed that Grates Cove was visited by seasonal fisherman before this and some have expressed the belief that it was visited as early as 1497 by John Cabot. This speculation has been fueled by the presence of a large rock high above the water on a cliff face located in Grates Cove. As Harold Horwood states, "some of those who formerly examined it, including a curator of the Newfoundland Museum, professed to be able to read the names IO CABOTO, SANCIUS and SAINMALIA quite plainly."

=== Timeline ===
- 1790: Grates Cove is first settled by four families from Lower Island Cove and one family from Old Perlican.
- 1792: John Hoskins Jr, comes to Grates Cove as a teacher and Methodist pastor.
- 1801: First formal school is begun, with John Hoskins Jr as the class teacher.
- 1809: First church is built by Methodists on land donated to the church by Thomas Cooper. William Ellis preaches the first sermon.
- 1836: Census records a population of 439.
- 1846: Grates Cove has two schools; one Roman Catholic and one Methodist.
- 1857: Population rises to 577 residents. Census reported 47 fishing rooms, 86 nets, seines and traps, 86 boats, 426 kg of fish caught.
- 1861: The Church of England church is built.
- 1869–1874: Roman Catholic Church is built.
- 1872: Road established between Grates Cove, Bay de Verde and Old Perlican.
- 1891 (January 24): Branch of Society of United Fishermen is established.
- 1901: Grates Cove is listing as having three schools, teaching all grades from one to eleven. A one-room Church of England school, a one-room Roman Catholic school and a two-room Methodist school.
- 1901–1935: A number of cod-oil factories are established. The highest number of factories was 12 in 1921.
- 1911: A new Roman Catholic Church is built and consecrated. Branch of the Fishermen's Protective Union is established. 165 acres (0.7 km^{2}) of cultivated land are recorded being utilized for potatoes, turnips, and other vegetables.
- 1913: Railway is extended to Grates Cove via Carbonear, Old Perlican, and Bay de Verde.
- 1921: 772 people reside in the community (the greatest number of residents listed for Grates Cove). Society of United Fishermen reaches its highest membership (109 total).
- 1931: A new United Church is built and open.
- 1937: A new Anglican church is consecrated by Bishop White.
- 1945: 480 residents are living in Grates Cove.
- 1950s: An amalgamation take place between the United Church schools and Anglican schools.
- 1960s (early): A breakwater is constructed by the government at nearby Cooper's Point.
- 1961 (September): Amalgamation is discontinued when the denominations do not agree on the building of one larger school.
- 1964: United Church opens a two-room school and the Anglican Church builds a new school.
- 1964: First road is rebuilt.
- 1966: Population fell to 372 residents.
- 1967: Grates Cove school system is completely reorganized. The Roman Catholic St. Joseph's Central High School is opened for Grades 7–11 in Bay de Verde. Accommodating all Roman Catholic students in the area as well as Protestants from Grates Cove and surrounding communities. The Anglican and Roman Catholic schools in Grates Cove are closed and the remaining students from Kindergarten to Grade 6 are taught in the two-room United Church school.
- 1973: Tricon Elementary in nearby Bay de Verde open, and the two-room United Church school is closed.
- 1976: The population recorded at 249.

=== The shipwreck of The Mollie ===
The Mollie was a coasting schooner posted out of Carmanville, Newfoundland that was lost near Grates Cove on the evening of December 20, 1944. All people on board were lost. The Mollie's Captain was Ross Chaulk, who was 26 years old and unmarried. Lost with him were James Ellsworth, age 25, John Goodyear, age 61 also his two sons Reginald Goodyear, age 32 and Charles Goodyear, age 26, both of them were also unmarried. The last crew member was Otto Hicks of Musgrave Harbour, who was a widower with one child. The cook, Charles Goodyear just 2 years earlier survived another near-miss shipwreck on the schooner L.C. Norman when it ran into the tip of Cape Bonavista. 13 crews of men from Grates Cove made trips to recover the bodies of the crew of The Mollie.

== Geography ==
Grates Cove is in Newfoundland within Subdivision G of Division No. 1.

== Demographics ==
As a designated place in the 2016 Census of Population conducted by Statistics Canada, Grates Cove recorded a population of 127 living in 59 of its 95 total private dwellings, a change of −16.4% from its 2011 population of 152. With a land area of 3.94 km^{2} (1.52 sq mi), it had a population density of 32.2/km^{2} (83.5/sq mi) in 2016.

== Government ==
Grates Cove is a local service district (LSD) that is governed by a committee responsible for the provision of certain services to the community. The chair of the LSD committee is David Stanford.

== Attractions ==
- Cabot Rock Monument [Stolen]
- Grates Cove Rock Walls
- Parks Canada Trail
- Grate’s Cove Lookout
- Grate's Cove Studios

=== National historic site ===
The "Walled Landscape of Grates Cove" was designated a National Historic Site of Canada in 1995. The designated site comprises 60.7 hectares (150 acres) of grassy landscape containing small gardens demarcated by stone walls. The area represents a rare surviving example of a communal system of land and community organization unique to Newfoundland.

== See also ==
- List of communities in Newfoundland and Labrador
- List of designated places in Newfoundland and Labrador
- List of local service districts in Newfoundland and Labrador
