= Cabot rock monument =

The Cabot Rock Monument is an inscribed rock located at Grates Cove, Newfoundland, Canada. The monument to what is believed to be bear the names of the John Cabot and his youngest son Sancius.

Grates Cove is a fishing community located at the very tip of the Bay de Verde Peninsula on the Avalon Peninsula, may have been the first point of land that Cabot saw on his second voyage to the new world in 1497. William Cormack had noted in his 1822 journal where he writes,

The Point of Grates is the part of North America first discovered by Europeans. Sebastian Cabot landed here in 1497, and took possession of 'The Newfoundland' .... He recorded the event by cutting an inscription, still perfectly legible, on a large block of rock that stands on the shore.

Cormack did not mention Grates Cove specifically nor the inscriptions, but through the work of Leo Edward Francis English, head of the Newfoundland Museum in 1946, had taken pictures and confirmed text in the form of names 'IO CABOTO,' 'SANCIUS' and 'SAINMALIA' engraved in the rock.

Michael Howley, the Roman Catholic bishop of St. John's, Newfoundland and Labrador visited the community to verify its existence in 1897 around the time of the 400th anniversary celebrations of John Cabot's voyage to the New World but had found that the rock was covered by a fishing stage and that fish offal made it difficult to reach.

Then in 1927 Leo English took photos that he claimed to show the words IO CABOTO, and parts of other names, among them SANCIUS and SAINMALIA.
