= Paddy Sinnamon =

Frederick Joseph Sinnamon (called Paddy; 1895–1970) was an Anglican priest in Canada in the 20th century.

Sinnamon was educated at Trinity College, Dublin. He was ordained deacon in 1918; and priest in 1919. After curacies at Ballymoney, Darlington and Bishop Wearmouth he was the incumbent at Bay de Verde from 1928 until 1931. he was Rector of St Thomas, Montreal from 1932 until 1970 (Chaplain with the Royal Canadian Dragoons 1940–45). He was Archdeacon of Montreal from 1965 until 1970.
