= William James Herder =

William James Herder (1849–1922), publisher, born Old Perlican, Newfoundland Colony, was the founder of Newfoundland's first daily newspaper, The Evening Telegram.

Herder was educated at Methodist Academy and in 1863 had apprenticed as a printer for the Courier. When the Courier experienced financial difficulties Herder had bought it and in 1872 began the Evening Telegram. Herder also started the Advertisers Gazette in 1883, which experienced limited success.

Herder was a sports fan, as evident with the participation of many of the Herder family, that in 1935 the Evening Telegram donated the Herder Memorial Trophy to Newfoundland and Labrador Senior Hockey League for the winning team.

== See also ==
- List of people of Newfoundland and Labrador
