= Northern Bay Sands =

Beach in Newfoundland and Labrador, Canada

- Beach
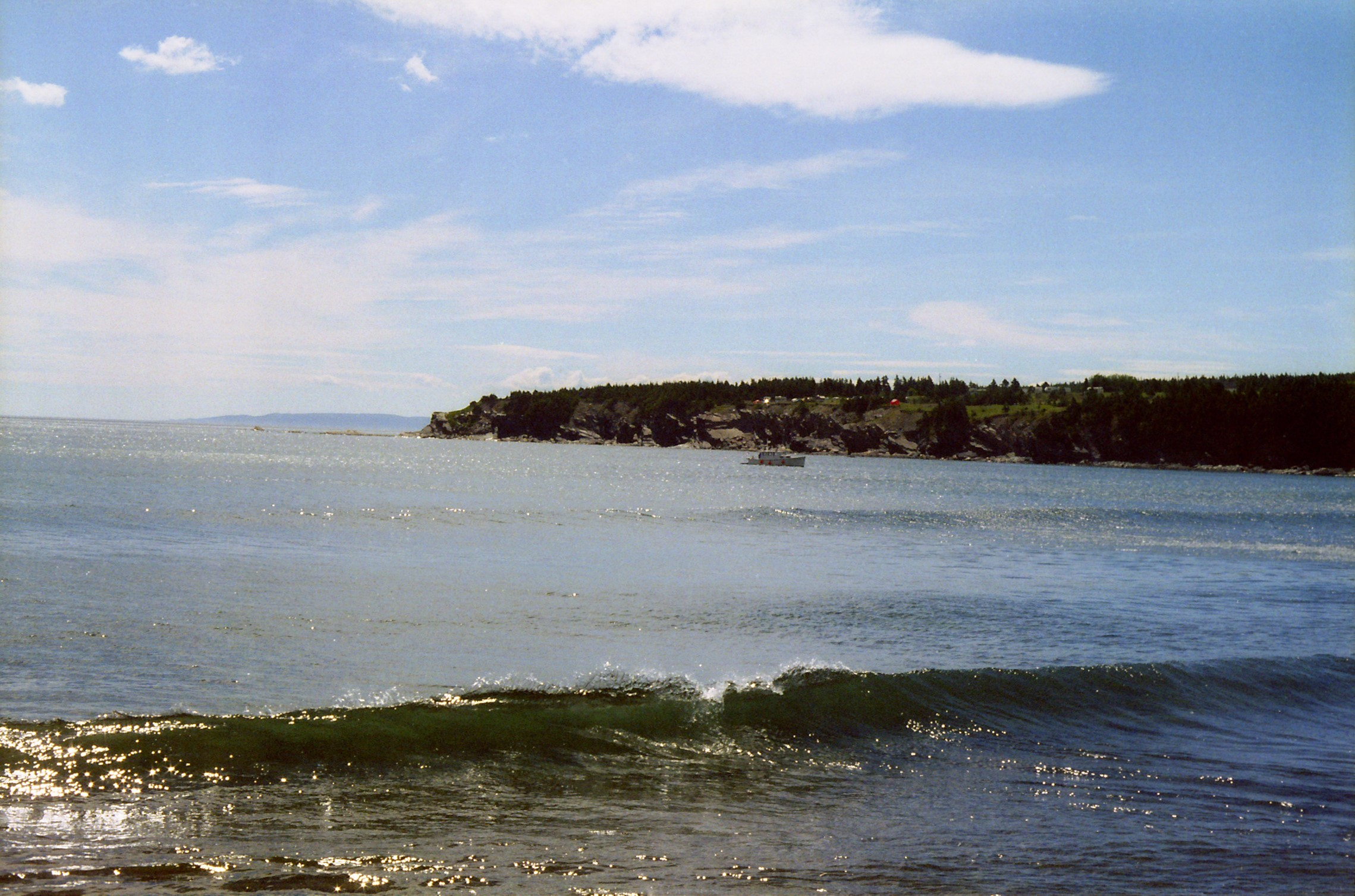
- Northern Bay Sands surf

- Location within Newfoundland and Labrador
- Coordinates: 47°56′10″N 53°04′37″W
- Location: NL-70, Northern Bay, Newfoundland and Labrador A0A 3B0, Canada
- Patrolled by: Lifeguards
- Access: Open

Northern Bay Sands is a popular beach and campgrounds in Northern Bay, Newfoundland and Labrador, Canada. In 1775, a ship supposedly crashed off the coast of the beach due to the Great Hurricane of 1775. Throughout the 19th and early 20th century the beach was used as a site for gutting, cleaning and salting fish in the small-boat cod fishery. After Confederation, the beach became a provincial park.

Tourism at the park – which presently has upwards of 50 campsites – steadily increased over the next few decades. In 1997, a majority of provincial parks in Newfoundland and Labrador were privatized.

The beach is frequented by many tourists between Victoria Day weekend (May 24) and Labour Day weekend in September. In the past there were music festivals, with a large one called The Beach Bash, that took place at least once a summer at the park. Presently, The Beach Bash and other festivals are no longer held and the stage where musicians performed for the festival has been removed. Coincidentally, the current owner and operator of the beach is Neal O'Leary, the independent Newfoundland musician who first started The Beach Bash.

Northern Bay Sands has two freshwater pools on the northern end of the beach and the majority of its campsites on the southern end. There are two bars, a laundromat, a café and a take-out restaurant within walking distance of the beach.

== See also ==
- Northern Bay, Newfoundland and Labrador
- List of Canadian provincial parks
