= William Taverner (surveyor) =

Newfoundland plantation owner and surveyor

William Taverner (c. 1680 – 7 July 1768) born Bay de Verde, Newfoundland. Taverner, son of William Taverner was a plantation owner in St. John's in 1768 and by 1702 had business establishments in Trinity and Poole. He became very successful in his business, so much so he spent the winter months in England.

Following the Treaty of Utrecht, Placentia and the southwest coast of the Island of Newfoundland were ceded to Britain. Taverner was appointed to survey this part of the coast and the adjacent islands where the French usually fished. His report, presented in 1718, included charts and noted the presence of French ships at Saint Pierre. From 1718 until 1725, Taverner was probably involved in the trade between Poole, Placentia and Saint Pierre. He and other Poole men were involved in the salmon fishery of the south coast in 1726.

Taverner conducted another survey from 1726 to 1728, this time on the west and northeast coast of the Island of Newfoundland. Experimenting with trade and the fishery in the area, he was operating on his own account in the Strait of Belle Isle in 1729. As an advisor to the Board of Trade, Taverner was consulted in 1740 on the question of fortifications in Newfoundland. His review of the fishery for the years 1736 to 1739 demonstrated the need for protection. Most of Taverner's survey work was presented verbally rather than in chart form and few documents are extant. Nevertheless, Taverners work was significant in expanding English knowledge of the south coast and in pioneering trade in the areas previously dominated by the French and Basques.
