= Elmer Frank Harris =

Elmer Frank Harris (born November 1939 in Seal Cove, Conception Bay Newfoundland), is a noted Canadian humanitarian.

Harris first came to national attention when he was the first Newfoundlander elected as National President of the Radio Television News Directors Association of Canada. Under his leadership meetings were held with the Commons Standing Committee on Broadcasting to introduce Broadcasting of the House of Commons in Ottawa on a national television channel. Harris first recognized the broadcasting talents of Rex Murphy, a noted Canadian commentator.

In 2003 Harris was awarded the Queen Elizabeth Silver Jubilee and in 2005 received from the Governor General of Canada, Adrienne Clarkson, "The Caring Canadian Award". These awards were presented for outstanding humanitarian service to Canada.

Harris started the Janeway Children's Foundation in Newfoundland and Labrador. He also established the Children's Wish Foundation of Canada in the province and was the first President of the VOCM Cares Foundation. Harris was instrumental in Forming the Joseph R. Smallwood Foundation and along with Memorial University President Moses Morgan and businessman, [[Paul Johnson (philanthropistElmer )|Paul Johnson]], completed Newfoundland Encyclopedia. This work was started by Premier Smallwood but unfinished at the time of his death.

Harris is a frequent contributor to the official magazine of the Pentecostal Assemblies of Newfoundland and Labrador, "Good Tidings."Radio Television Directors Association of Canada announces Lifetime Achievement Award Winner Elmer Harris former senior vice-president of VOCM Radio St. John’s, Newfoundland and Labrador. Elmer Harris is a former President of RTNDA Canada and lifer at VOCM Radio who retired from broadcasting in 2000. "Elmer is a forward-thinker who moved VOCM and its network newsrooms into the technological age early when he introduced computers in the 70’s and a website by the mid 80’s," said Past President Gerry Phelan who nominated Elmer for this prestigious award. Elmer worked his way from a rookie reporter to vice president and Assistant to the President at VOCM Radio and for over 40 years was an integral part of the station.

In a simultaneous presentation in the province of Quebec on June 7, 2008, Harris was given two national awards, one from the Children's Wish Foundation and the other from the Kidney Foundation of Canada. The Children's Wish presented Harris with the Laura Cole Award for volunteer of the year and the Kidney Foundation presented him with the David Ornstein Award for distinguished service.
