= Bay de Verde Peninsula =

Peninsula in Newfoundland and Labrador, Canada

Coordinates: 47.80°N 53.31°W

Location of Bay de Verde Peninsula in Newfoundland

The Bay de Verde Peninsula is the largest peninsula that makes up part of the Avalon Peninsula, of the province of Newfoundland and Labrador, Canada. The peninsula separates both Trinity and Conception Bay.

== Geography ==
Starting from the Conception Bay side, the peninsula commences at the bottom of Conception Bay at Holyrood and continues north to Bay de Verde and Split Point, the boundary for Conception Bay. Continuing around the tip of the peninsula to Breakheart Point the boundary point for Trinity Bay and continues in a southerly direction to South Dildo.

The highways servicing the Bay de Verde Peninsula are Route 60, Route 70, Route 80, and many local roads.

== History ==
This peninsula contains the oldest settlements on the island of Newfoundland.

== Economy ==
The communities and towns on the Bay de Verde Peninsula have grown due to the fishing grounds in its proximity and its closeness to the rich fishing grounds of the Grand Banks.

== Communities ==
- Grate's Cove
- Bay de Verde
- Caplin Cove
- Lower Island Cove
- Burnt Point
- Gull Island
- Northern Bay
- Blackhead
- Salmon Cove
- Victoria
- Clowns Cove
- Freshwater
- Carbonear
- Harbour Grace
- Bishop's Cove
- Spaniard's Bay
- Chapel's Cove
- Daniel's Cove
- Old Perlican
- Holyrood
- Job's Cove
- Lakeview
- Low Point
- Red Head Cove
- Woodford
- Ochre Pit Cove
- Western Bay

== See also ==
- List of communities in Newfoundland and Labrador
