= Resolven (ship) =

Merchant brig which was found abandoned

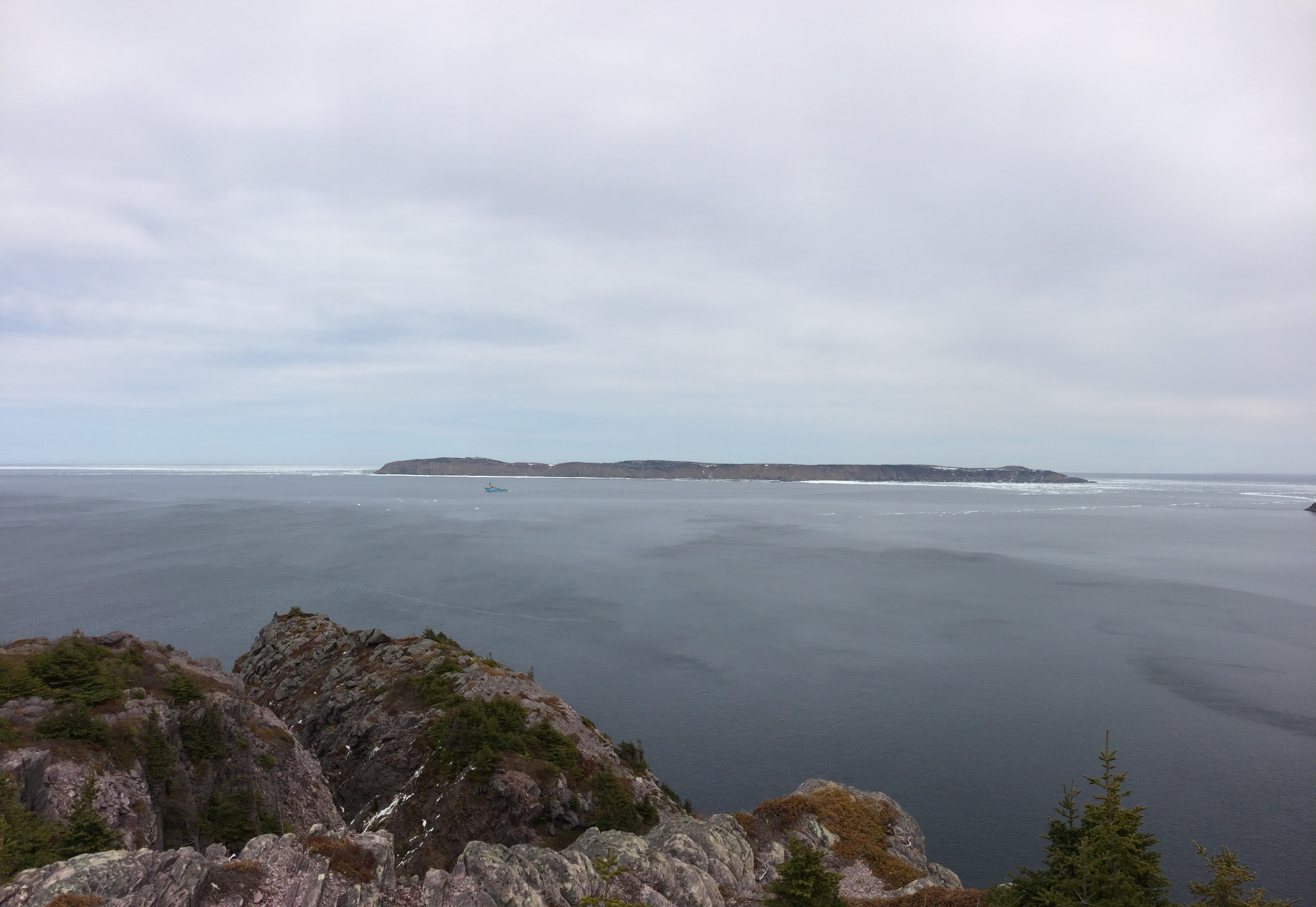
Baccalieu Island and the surrounding waters, where Resolven was found adrift on 29 August 1884

The SV Resolven was a merchant brig which was found abandoned on 29 August 1884, with her lifeboat missing, between Baccalieu Island and Catalina, Newfoundland and Labrador. The ship's crew appears to have abandoned Resolven for unknown reasons in the approximately six hours between the last entry in the ship's log and her sighting by HMS Mallard of the Royal Navy; none of those who had been aboard Resolven were ever seen or heard from again.

Due to the mysterious circumstances under which Resolven was found adrift, her fate has been compared to that of the infamous brigantine Mary Celeste.

== Background ==
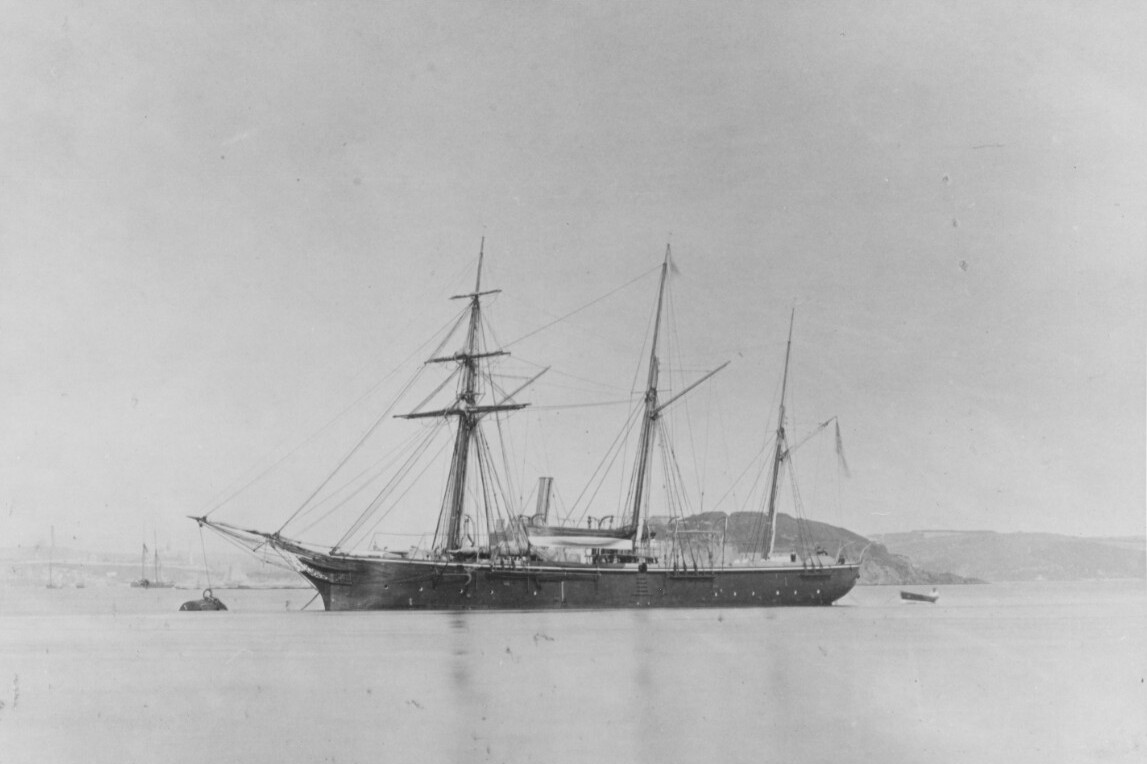
HMS Express in 1874, a Forester-class gunboat similar to HMS Mallard, which found the abandoned Resolven

Named for the village in Neath Port Talbot, Wales, Resolven was built as a merchant cargo ship, making her homeport in Aberystwyth. Her primary route was between Wales and Canada, moving cargoes of timber and cod. She was captained by John James of Newquay.

== Derelict ==
On 29 August 1884, Resolven was found by the Royal Navy gunboat HMS Mallard, under the command of Lieutenant William L.H. Browne. Mallard moved to board after sighting the vessel's odd, erratic movements, and after receiving no response to repeated attempts at hailing the vessel.

Upon boarding Resolven, HMS Mallard's sailors found an intact and serviceable vessel with no evidence as to why the ship would have been abandoned. The last entry in her logbook was within just six hours of her being sighted. Other than a broken yard, she had suffered only superficial damage. The ship's lifeboat was missing, but with no indication as to why. The galley fire was alight and the lamps were burning. A large iceberg was sighted nearby.

It has been claimed that none of the seven crew members or four passengers were accustomed to northern waters and it was suggested that they panicked when the ship was damaged by ice, launched the lifeboat, and swamped, though no bodies were found. The ship was towed into the nearby port, refitted and put out to sea again under a new owner and crew. No trace of her crew on 29 August 1884 has ever been found.

The mystery of this ship earned it the nickname "The Welsh Mary Celeste".

== Aftermath ==
With her original captain and crew unable to be found, Resolven was towed to Catalina by the Royal Navy, refitted and sent back out to sea for another three years.

Struck with misfortune a second and final time, Resolven was wrecked in 1887 while returning to Newfoundland from Nova Scotia with a load of lumber.

== See also ==
- List of people who disappeared mysteriously at sea
