= Kellys Island (Newfoundland and Labrador) =

Island in Newfoundland and Labrador, Canada

Coordinates: 47°32′38″N 53°00′59″W

Location of Kellys Island in Newfoundland

Kellys Island is an uninhabited island in Newfoundland and Labrador Canada. With a length of approximately 2 km and a width at its widest point of 1.3 km, it is situated in southeastern Conception Bay. Tradition has it that Kelly's Island took its name from a seventeenth-century Cornish pirate who used the island as a rendezvous point. The island reported a small population in the first two (1836 and 1845) censuses. Captain Kelly is also said to have buried treasure on the island and local tradition has it that the treasure was located by unknown visitors in 1920.

== See also ==
- Bell Island, Newfoundland and Labrador
- List of islands of Newfoundland and Labrador
