= Beseler =

Beseler is a surname. Notable people with the surname include:

- Elmer Beseler Harris (1939–2019), American businessman and political strategist
- Georg Beseler (1809–1888), Prussian jurist and politician
- Hans Hartwig von Beseler (1850–1921), German general

== See also ==
- Beseler company
