= Small Point-Adam's Cove-Blackhead-Broad Cove =

Small Point-Broad Cove-Blackhead-Adam’s Cove
- Town
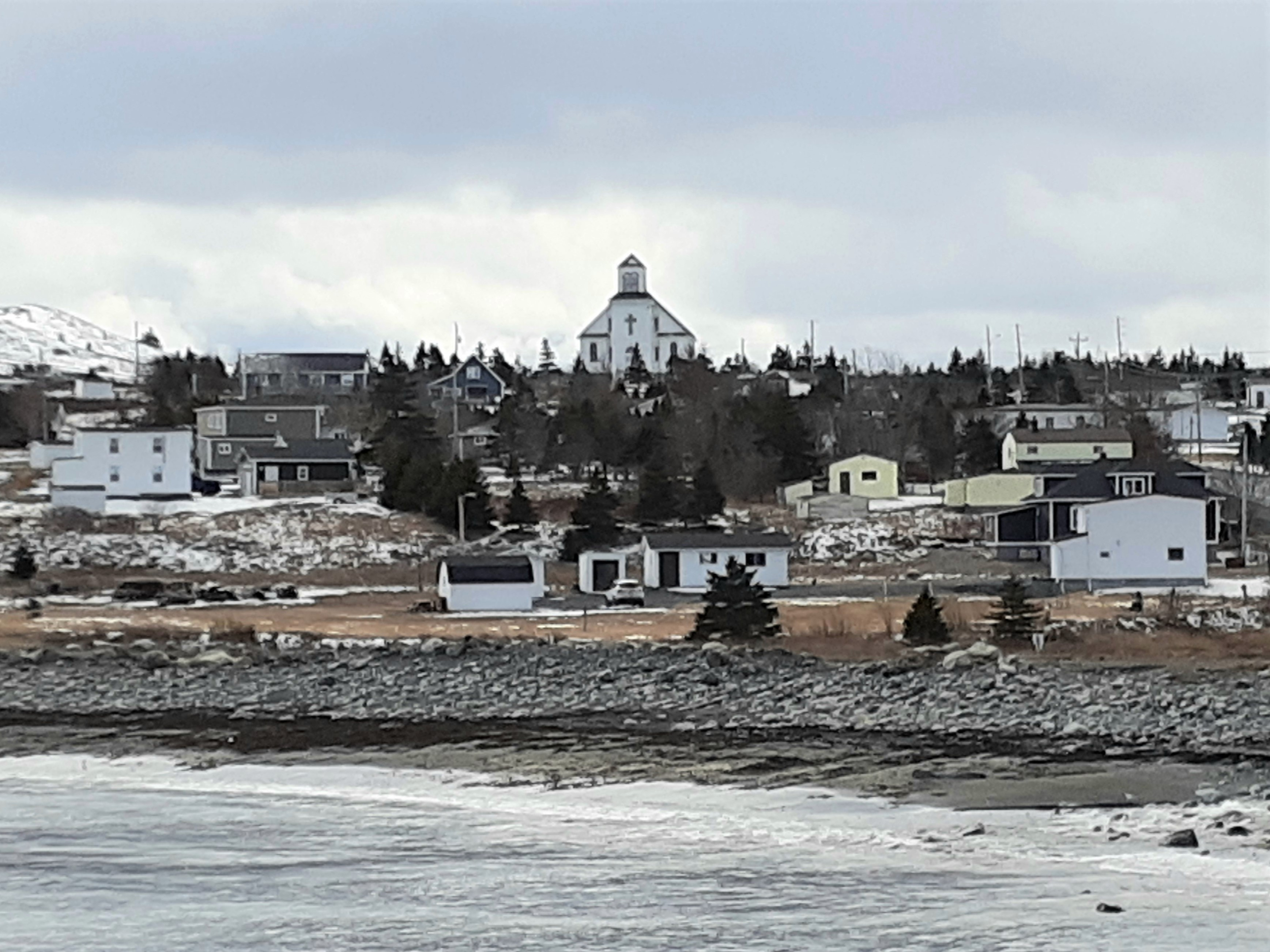
- Overlooking Broad Cove

- Location of Small Point-Adam's Cove-Blackhead-Broad Cove in Newfoundland
- Coordinates: 47°51′46″N 53°05′01″W
- Country: Canada
- Province: Newfoundland and Labrador
- Incorporated: 1968

Population (2021)
  - Total: 414
- Time zone: UTC-3:30 (Newfoundland Time)
  - Summer (DST): UTC-2:30 (Newfoundland Daylight)
- Area code: 709
- Highways: Route 70

Small Point-Adam's Cove-Blackhead-Broad Cove is a town in the Canadian province of Newfoundland and Labrador, located in the Trinity-Conception Bay District north of Carbonear.

The town was incorporated in 1968 by amalgamating the independent fishing villages of Small Point, Adam's Cove, Blackhead and Broad Cove. The neighbouring community of Kingston was originally part of the amalgamation, but withdrew in 1976.

The town had a population of 414 in the Canada 2021 Census.

== 2025 Wildfires ==
On May 8, 2025, Adam's Cove experienced a severe wildfire with up to 600 hectares of land being destroyed. 40 structures of residents from Adam’s Cove to Western Bay were also destroyed.

On August 3, 2025, a wildfire broke out in Kingston, an unincorporated area south of Small Point-Adam's Cove-Blackhead-Broad Cove. Early the next afternoon, evacuation orders were issued for both Kingston and Small Point-Adam's Cove-Blackhead-Broad Cove as the fire burned out of control, spreading north and south. The Kingston fire was reported at 10,708 ha (26,460 acres) on August 19 and had destroyed 203 structures (33 in Small Point-Broad Cove-Blackhead-Adam's Cove). On August 30, the fire was classified as under control and all evacuation orders were lifted.

== Demographics ==
In the 2021 Census of Population conducted by Statistics Canada, Small Point-Adam's Cove-Blackhead-Broad Cove had a population of 414 living in 200 of its 327 total private dwellings, a change of 7% from its 2016 population of 387. With a land area of 23.12 km^{2} (8.93 sq mi), it had a population density of 17.9/km^{2} (46.4/sq mi) in 2021.

== See also ==
- List of cities and towns in Newfoundland and Labrador
- Bay de Verde Peninsula
