= Besler (mountain) =

Mountain in Bavaria, Germany

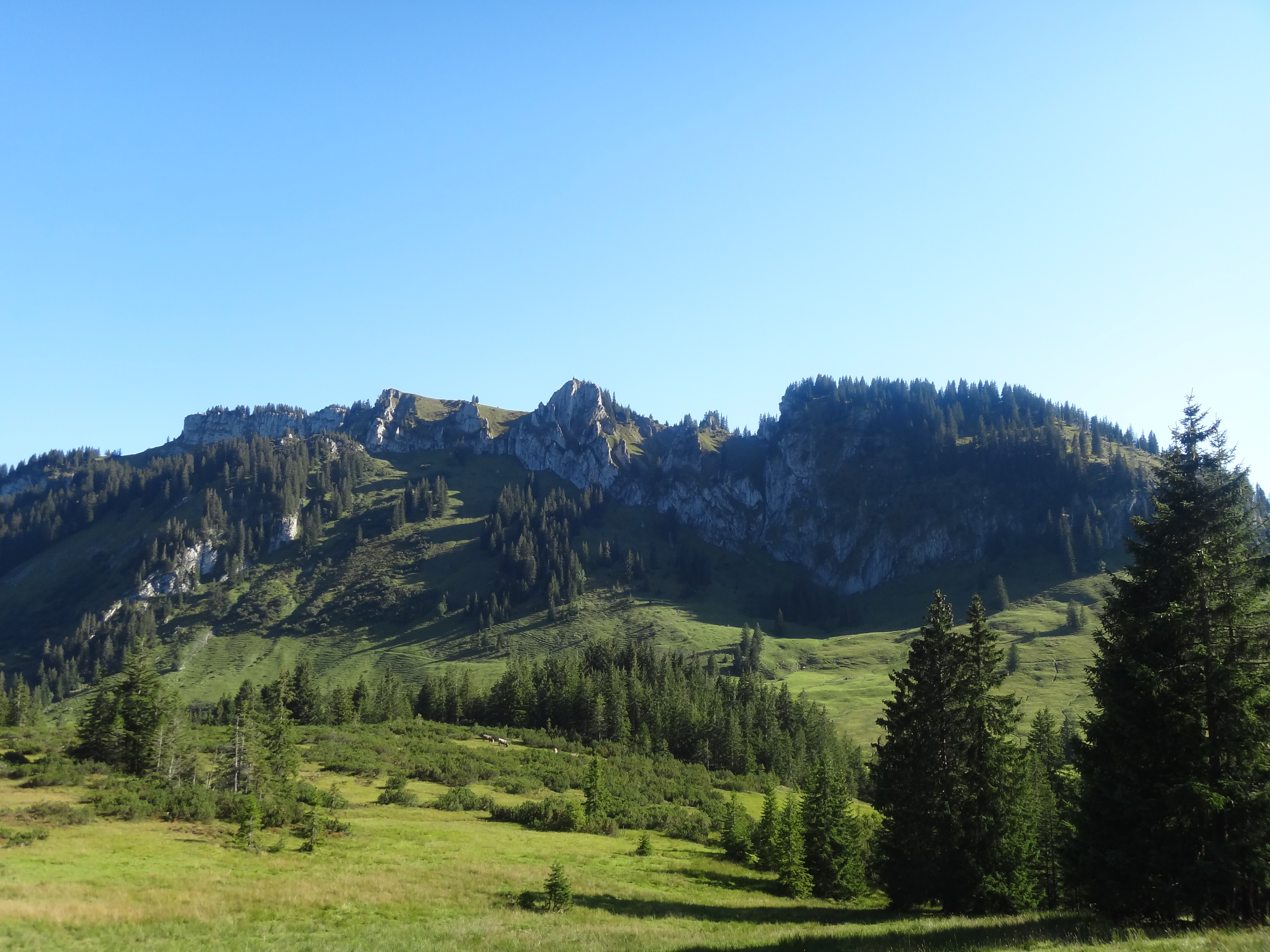

Highest point
- Elevation: 1,679 m (5,509 ft)
- Coordinates: 47°26′N 10°11′E

Geography
- Location: Bavaria, Germany

Besler is a mountain of Bavaria, Germany.

== Location and surroundings ==
Besler mountain is located on the southern side of the Riedberg Pass, a pass road in the district of Oberallgäu, which connects Obermaiselstein with Balderschwang and further with Austrian Vorarlberg. The mountain lies between the mountain valleys of Lochbach in the south and Schönberger Ach in the north.

In addition to the main or eastern summit, the Besler has a central peak (1655 m (5430 ft.) above sea level) and a western summit, the Schafkopf (1602 m (5256 ft.) above sea level). In addition, an inconspicuous elevation between Besler and Beslerkopf is referred to as Beslergrat (1668 m (5472 ft.) above sea level NHN).

== Geology ==
The rocky peak of the mountain stands out in a characteristic way ("like a wall") from the surrounding mountain meadows. It consists of the sedimentary rock of the Helvetic Chalk, which is less widespread on the surface of the Allgäu Alps. From this rock, for example, the Hohe Ifen, parts of the Grünten, the Diedamskopf in the Bregenzerwald and the Säntis in eastern Switzerland are built. On the South Side of Besler there is a karst landscape.

== Ascent ==
Possible starting points for a mountain hike on the Besler are Obermaiselstein (859 m (2818 ft.) above sea level NHN), Tiefenbach (880 m (2887 ft.) above sea level NHN), Rohrmoos (1070 m (3510.49 ft.) above sea level) or Grasgehren (1450 m (4757 ft.) above sea level) on the Riedberg Pass road.

The tour from Obermaiselstein leads past the nearby Sturmannshöhle, to which a detour is possible. On the Königsweg, a hunting trail named after King Max II of Bavaria, one reaches the Schwarzenberg Jagdhaus. From there, the trail continues over the Upper Gundalpe via a short via ferrata (difficulty A/B) to the summit. This takes about three hours.

About the same time is needed from the Oberstdorf district of Tiefenbach. Here the trail leads over the Lochbach valley to the Besler. From Rohrmoos you have a higher starting point, but first you have to switch from the Starzlachtal to the adjacent Lochbachtal valley. The total time required for the ascent is about two and a half hours.

From the Riedberg Pass you first have to descend to the Schönbergalpe (1345 m (4413 ft.) above sea level) on the northern Beslerhang. The total time required for the summit is about one and a half hours.

The Besler can be climbed well from mid to late May in terms of ice and snow conditions, whereby the south-facing variant is favored from the Lochbach valley. In early summer, a variety of mountain flower species blooms on the mountain, such as white silver root, gentiana and aurikel.
