= Jerry Beisler =

American poet (1942–2020)

Jerry Beisler (1942–2020) was an American cannabis breeder, poet, author and musician. He was known as the "Bandit of Kabul" for smuggling cannabis along the hippie trail in the 1970s.

== Background ==
Beisler was born in Chicago, Illinois in 1942. He was raised in the Miller Beach section of Gary, Indiana. He graduated from Wirt High School where he was Class Vice President and a multi-sport athlete. Beisler's brother Randy played in the National Football League for 11 years. Beisler attended Indiana University Bloomington (1961-1966), San Francisco State University (1968), and Mexico City College (1963). Beisler wrote editorial page commentary, Hawaiian history features and traveling articles for The Garden Island newspaper from 1989–1995 and occasionally contributed the same to the Honolulu Star Bulletin and the Kauai Times.

== Works ==
Beisler also created and produced The Cutting Edge Television show from 1999–2006. The show won the Best Entertainment award for the Public Access Television in 2002, beating over 500 entries for the prize. Beisler also produced hundreds of studio and live music recordings. He promoted shows in many musical genres exemplified by Jazz (The Yellow Jackets) Rock (Fleetwood Mac, Crosby, Stills, and Nash) Americana (Los Lobos, Rodney Crowell) Blues (Howlin’ Wolf, Mike Bloomfield) and Reggae (The Iytals). For credits and business in music and television, Beisler was known as Jerry B.

Beisler Published two books of poetry for Print Mint Press (Mother Asia and Cousin California and St. Elvis) plus one for Raindance Publishing (Hawaiian Life). Beisler also wrote video and music reviews for the Chico News and Review. He is also the author of The Berkeley Years, and three books of poetry: Mother Asia and Cousin California, St. Elvis and Missionary Thought, and Hawaiian Life and the Pink Dolphins. Beisler also produced the CD Baby 34 song double-album The Art of the Single.

== Personal life and death ==
Beisler married his wife Rebecca in 1971, during a visit to Agra, India. Beisler died of a heart attack in October 2020.
