= Marc Bessler =

American surgeon

- Education: New York University School of Medicine
- Occupation: Bariatric surgeon
- Known for: Innovations in bariatrics

Marc Bessler is an American surgeon known for his innovations in bariatrics. He is currently the United States Surgical Professor of Surgery at Columbia University Medical Center. Starting in July 2024, he will be the Chair of the Department of Surgery at Northwell Health Lenox Hill Hospital. He also serves as a content contributor for Bariatric Surgery Source. Bessler specializes in surgical management of morbid obesity and laparoscopic surgery of the stomach, among other specialties.

== Education ==
Marc Bessler earned his medical degree from New York University School of Medicine. He then completed his residency in general surgery and his fellowship in surgical endoscopy at the NewYork-Presbyterian Hospital in New York City.

== Career ==
Bessler has performed, or helped perform, procedures on several prominent Americans. He assisted in the liver transplant of Alonzo Mourning, removing the donor kidney from one of Mourning's relatives. He also performed the gastric bypass procedure on Michael Genadry, who played Mark Vanacore on Ed, and has performed bariatric procedures on at least two contestants from The Biggest Loser.

== Innovative procedures ==
In 1997, Bessler was among the first surgeons to perform bariatric surgery laparoscopically in the United States. In 2008, Bessler participated in a trial for "Toga", or transoral gastroplasty, where instruments are passed through a patient's mouth and into the stomach, which is a less invasive form of surgery than laparoscopy.

Bessler was also the first surgeon to perform the NOTES (natural orifice translumenal endoscopic surgery) procedure. In this procedure, Bessler was able to make a small incision in the vaginal wall and then retrieve and pass a kidney or gallbladder through the incision. This procedure is also less invasive than laparoscopy, resulting in a faster recovery time.
