= Baccalieu Island =

Uninhabited island in Newfoundland and Labrador

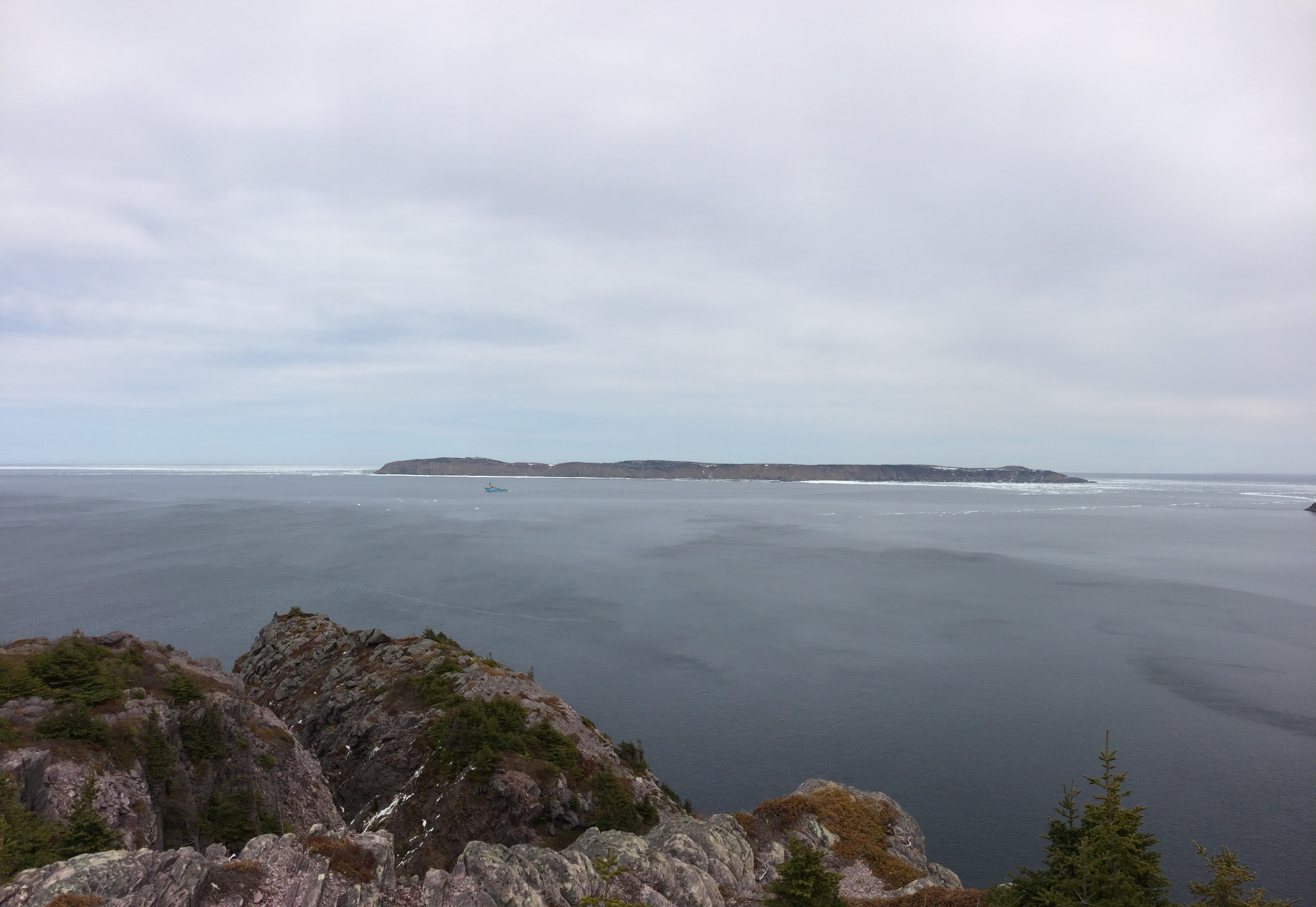
- Baccalieu Island as seen from Avalon Peninsula

- Location within Newfoundland and Labrador

Geography
- Coordinates: 48°07′49″N 52°48′05″W
- Area: 5 km^{2} (1.9 sq mi)
- Highest elevation: 137 m (449 ft)
- Highest point

Administration
- Canada
- Province: Newfoundland and Labrador

Demographics
- Population: 0

Baccalieu Island or Bacalhoo Island (/ˌbækəˈluː/) is a 5 km^{2} uninhabited island at the northern extremities of Conception Bay in Subdivision 1G, near the community of Red Head Cove, Newfoundland and Labrador, Canada. It is separated from the island of Newfoundland by Baccalieu Tickle, a small strait and an abundant fishing ground. The island has some trees but is mostly rocky.

The name Baccalieu is derived either from the Portuguese bacalhau, Spanish bacalao or the Basque bakailao, all meaning "codfish". Early Portuguese maps dating before Columbus' voyage indicate an island west of the Azores named Terra do Bacalhau which may have been the whole island of Newfoundland. Modern Baccalieu Island was known to Europeans by that name since at least 1556, when it was drawn on the Gastaldi map as "Bacalaos".

== Ecological Reserve ==
Baccalieu Island is the largest seabird island in Newfoundland and supports the greatest diversity of breeding seabirds in eastern North America. The island supports the largest known colony of Leach's storm-petrel in the world, approximately 40% of the global population and about 70% of the western Atlantic population of this species. It is a nesting area for 11 breeding species:

- Atlantic puffin (45,000 pairs - approximately 12% of the eastern North America population)
- Black-legged kittiwake (13,000 - approximately 5 to 7% of the western Atlantic breeding population); and
- Northern gannet (677 pairs - approximately 1.5% of the North American population).
- Northern fulmar
- Black guillemot
- Common murre
- Thick-billed murre
- Razorbill
- Herring gull
- Great black-backed gull
- The island also includes one of the largest winter populations of eider in Newfoundland.

The island has a surface of 5 km^{2}, and the reserve spans 23 km^{2}, including all of the island and one kilometre of ocean around the coast.

== Lighthouses ==
Baccalieu Island Lighthouse North Point
- Location: Baccalieu Island; Avalon Peninsula; Newfoundland and Labrador; Canada
- Coordinates: 48°08′59″N 52°47′54″W

Tower
- Constructed: 1859 (first)
- Construction: brick tower covered by iron plates since 1893 with balcony and lantern (first) steel skeletal tower (current)
- Height: 11 metres (36 ft) (first); 13.5 metres (44 ft) (current)
- Shape: cylindrical tower with balcony and lantern (first) triangular tower (current)
- Markings: rusty colour tower (first) white tower (current)
- Power source: solar power
- Operator: Baccalieu Island Ecological Reserve

Light
- First lit: 1990s (current)
- Deactivated: 1990s (first)
- Focal height: 166 metres (545 ft) (current)
- Range: 7 nmi (13 km; 8.1 mi)
- Characteristic: Fl W 6s.

Historically, two lighthouses were operated on Baccalieu Island; today both are automated. The lighthouse on the northern end is not operational any more; its light was extinguished in the early 1990s. This lighthouse was replaced as an aid to navigation by an automated light on a skeletal tower. It was originally a brick tower and was later encased in iron. The two storey residence attached was removed after 1950. The old tower's data:

- Tower height: 36 feet (11 m)
- Height of focal plane: 443 feet (135 m)
- Description: Red, conical cast iron
- Date established: 1859
- Date present tower built: 1858
- Date deactivated: 1990s
- Current use: Unknown
- Open to public: No

=== Lighthouse Keepers ===
North Light Keepers

- James Ryan (1858 - 1874) (died 1875)
- John Ryan (1874 - 1891) (died 1891)
- Francis "Frank" Ryan (1891 - 1941) (died 1942)
- James Francis Ryan (1941 - 1950) (died 1994)
- Vincent Keough (1950-?)
- Joseph Hatch
- Felix Noonan (1963)
- Eric Blundon
- John Hyde
- James Meaney Jr. (assistant under Frank Ryan) (died 1939)

Southwest Light Keepers

- William Cranford (1908 - 1911)
- Duncan Blundon (1912 - ?)
- Joseph Burse
- William Blundon
- Oliver Blundon
- Arthur Young
- John F. Hatch
- Patrick Rice
- F. J. Noonan
- Raymond J. Hyde
- Linus Walsh (? - 2002)

== Ghost ship ==
In 1884 the merchant brig Resolven was found abandoned in the waters off Baccalieu and Catalina, Newfoundland and Labrador. The fate of the crew is unknown.

== See also ==
- List of lighthouses in Newfoundland and Labrador
- List of lighthouses in Canada
- "The Cliffs of Baccalieu"
