= Randy Beisler =

American football player (born 1944)

No. 80, 65, 64
- Positions: Guard, defensive tackle, defensive end, offensive tackle

Personal information
- Born: October 24, 1944 (age 82); Gary, Indiana, U.S.
- Listed height: 6 ft 5 in (1.96 m)
- Listed weight: 250 lb (113 kg)

Career information
- High school: William A. Wirt (Gary)
- College: Indiana
- NFL draft: 1966: 1st round, 4th overall pick

Career history
- Philadelphia Eagles (1966–1968); San Francisco 49ers (1969–1974); Kansas City Chiefs (1975–1976)

Career NFL statistics
- Games played: 118
- Games started: 49
- Interceptions: 1
- Stats at Pro Football Reference

Randall Lee Beisler (born October 24, 1944) is an American former professional football player who was an offensive lineman in the National Football League (NFL) for the Philadelphia Eagles, the San Francisco 49ers, and the Kansas City Chiefs. He played college football for the Indiana Hoosiers and was selected fourth overall by the Eagles in the first round of the 1966 NFL draft.

On May 5, 2013, Beisler was inducted into the Indiana Football Hall of Fame.

His brother, Jerry Beisler is a writer and poet.
