= Elmer Beseler Harris =

American businessman (1939–2019)

Elmer Beseler Harris (April 8, 1939 – December 23, 2019) was an American businessman and political strategist.

Elmer Harris was born in Chilton County, Alabama, to Alton and Lera Mae (Mitchell) Harris. After getting a BS degree in engineering from Auburn University in 1962, he began a 25-year career with the USAF and the ANG. After completing Air Force Flight School in 1964, he returned to Auburn to get both his MS in engineering (1968) and his M.B.A. (1970). He also attended the Air Command and Staff College at Maxwell Air Force Base in 1970 and the Air War College in 1985. He was a retired USAF Command Pilot and brigadier general in the Alabama Air National Guard. Harris served as honorary consul general of Japan. Harris was inducted into the Alabama Business Hall of Fame in 2007 as well as the Alabama Engineering Hall Of Fame in 1996.

Harris created the Alabama Power Foundation and funded it at $150 million, the largest foundation in Alabama. He also created the Economic Development Partnership of Alabama, a group of businesses working together with state governments to win major economic development projects, such as attracting and winning the first Mercedes plant located outside of Germany, followed by winning the Honda plant in Lincoln, Alabama and the Hyundai plant in Montgomery, Alabama, thus creating a major automobile industry in Alabama.

After starting out as a co-op student in engineering with the utility Alabama Power Company, he rose to become its top executive in 1989. He was appointed adjutant general in 2001. The former chairman, president and chief executive officer of Alabama Power was rumored to be a candidate for the Alabama Governor in 2006. He did not accept offers from both parties to run in that contest. He has received 6 honorary doctoral degrees from Auburn University, University of Alabama Birmingham, Troy University, Faulkner University, Jacksonville University, and Huntingdon College. Harris retired from Alabama Power in 2002 with 44 years of outstanding service to Alabama's largest corporation.

Harris served on numerous civic and business boards of directors, including Alabama Power Company, Southern Company, Southern Nuclear Operating Company, Mercedes Benz US International, AmSouth Bancorporation, Samford University, Air University Foundation, Auburn University Foundation, Meyer Foundation, United Way, Heart Association, Business Council of Alabama and National Association of Manufacturers.

After retirement from Alabama Power, Harris continued to work on needed Alabama education, constitutional, and tax reform. He continued his work as honorary consul general of Japan and remained active in various international activities. In addition, he remained very active in business, serving as chairman or CEO of several financial and real estate LLCs.

Harris died on December 23, 2019.
