= Salmon Cove =

Coordinates: 47.783°N 53.167°W

- Town
- Interactive map of Salmon Cove
- Country: Canada
- Province: Newfoundland and Labrador

Population (2021)
  - Total: 764
- Time zone: UTC-3:30 (Newfoundland Time)
  - Summer (DST): UTC-2:30 (Newfoundland Daylight)
- Area code: 709
- Highways: Route 70

Salmon Cove is a town in the Canadian province of Newfoundland and Labrador. The town had a population of 764 in the Canada 2021 Census, up from 695 in 2016.

== Demographics ==
In the 2021 Census of Population conducted by Statistics Canada, Salmon Cove had a population of 764 living in 340 of its 393 total private dwellings, a change of 12.4% from its 2016 population of 680. With a land area of 4.21 km^{2} (1.63 sq mi), it had a population density of 181.5/km^{2} (470.0/sq mi) in 2021.

== See also ==
- List of cities and towns in Newfoundland and Labrador
- Bay de Verde Peninsula
