= Old Perlican =

Old Perlican Parlican
- Town
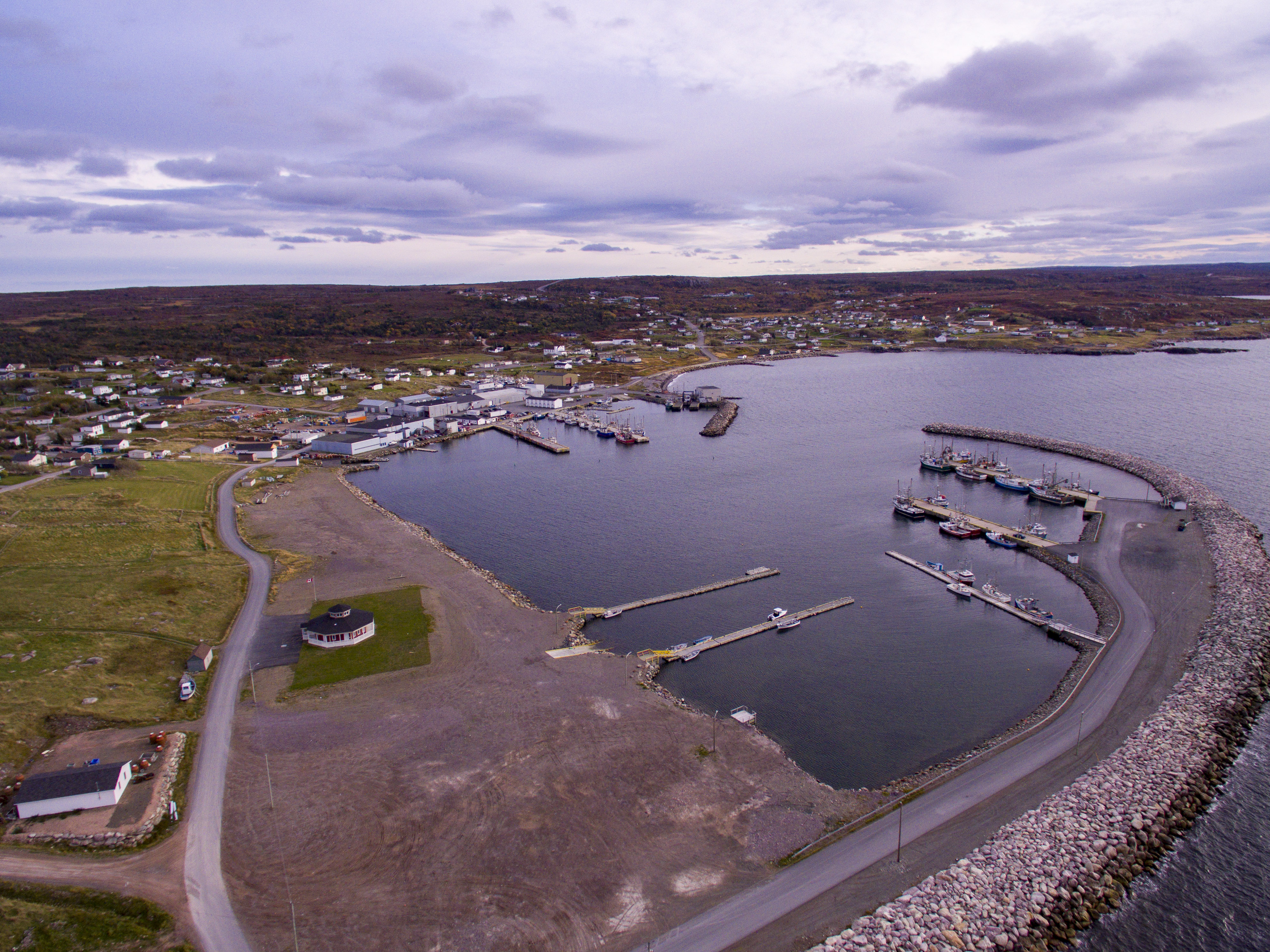
- Marina of Old Perlican

- Location of Old Perlican in Newfoundland
- Coordinates: 48°04′55″N 53°00′22″W
- Country: Canada
- Province: Newfoundland and Labrador
- Settled: 1640
- Incorporated: 1971

Government
  - Mayor: Clifford Morgan
  - Deputy Mayor: Tammy Squires

Population (2021)
  - Total: 608
- Time zone: UTC-3:30 (Newfoundland Time)
  - Summer (DST): UTC-2:30 (Newfoundland Daylight)
- Area code: 709
- Highways: Route 70; Route 80

Old Perlican is a fishing village on the Avalon Peninsula, Newfoundland and Labrador in Canada. Incorporated in 1791, it is one of the oldest fishing communities in Newfoundland; it served as the major fishing station in Trinity Bay for migratory fisherman from England in the 17th century.

== History ==
Its name was recorded as "Parlican" as early as 1597. "Old" was added sometime later to distinguish it from New Perlican; the latter is located further up the bay.

It was settled by at least 1640. A "planter" (an early settler or colonist) named John Barrett (1654-1714) lived there after arriving from Poole, England in 1711. One of, if not, the oldest recorded English land transaction in Newfoundland archives is between John Barrett and John Carter in 1711 in Old Perlican. The original is in the St. John's archives and a photocopy hangs in the Old Perlican Town Hall.

=== Timeline ===
- 1597 - Old Perlican was first mentioned as "Parlican". At this time, Old Perlican is a summer fishery station for migratory fishermen.
- 1675 - First Newfoundland Census lists fourteen planters.
- 1697 - (February) - French under D'Iberville capture Old Perlican. They report that there are "19 houses, several stores, more than thirty head of horned cattle, and a number of sheep and pigs". During King William's War, the village was destroyed in the Avalon Peninsula Campaign.
- 1729 - Old Perlican is one of 11 harbors in Newfoundland to warrant the appointment of justice of the peace.
- 1856 - Way Office established.
- 1883 - First Postmaster was George Tuff.

== Demographics ==
In the 2021 Census of Population conducted by Statistics Canada, Old Perlican had a population of 608 living in 253 of its 316 total private dwellings, a change of −3.9% from its 2016 population of 633. With a land area of 14.14 km^{2} (5.46 sq mi), it had a population density of 43.0/km^{2} (111.4/sq mi) in 2021.

== Notable people ==
- Marilyn Churley, former Ontario MPP
- William James Herder, founder of Newfoundland's first daily newspaper

== See also ==
- List of cities and towns in Newfoundland and Labrador
- Bay de Verde Peninsula
