= Conception Bay (Canada) =

Bay in Newfoundland and Labrador

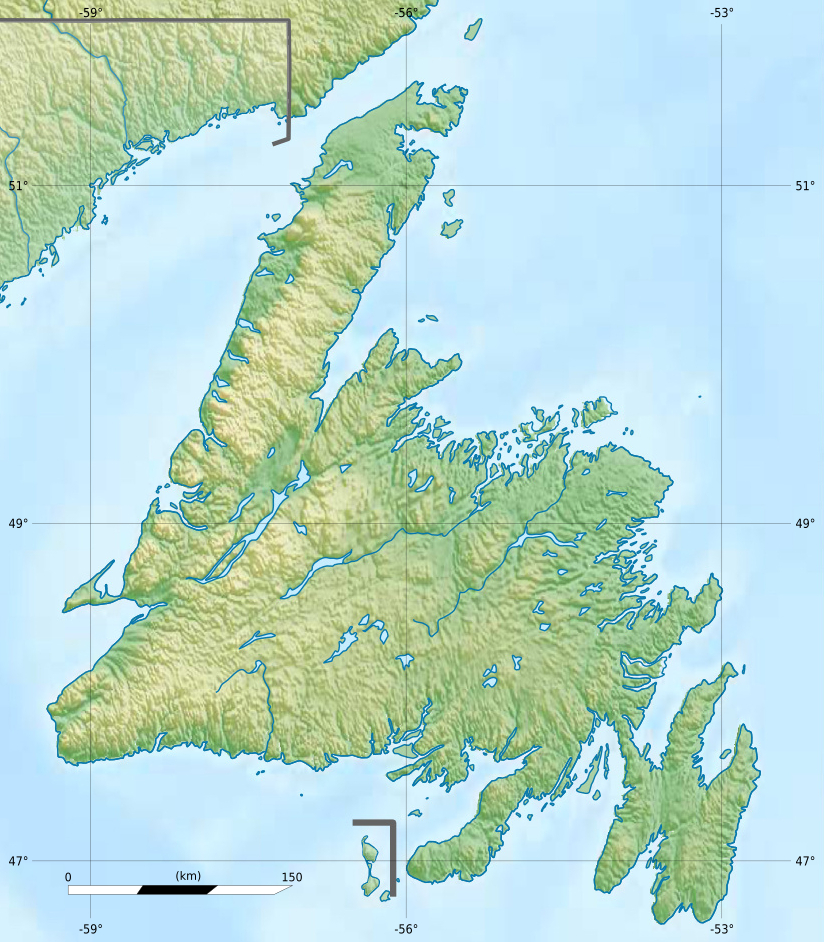
- Location in Newfoundland
- Location: Newfoundland
- Coordinates: 47.75°N 53.00°W
- Ocean/sea sources: Labrador Sea, North Atlantic Ocean
- Basin countries: Canada
- Islands: Bell Island

Conception Bay (CB) is a bay on the Avalon Peninsula, Newfoundland and Labrador.

The population (in 2011) of people living in municipalities (or unincorporated census subdivisions) located along the coast of Conception Bay was 90,490 making it one of the most densely populated areas of the province. Conception Bay is adjacent to the St. John's Metropolitan Area which contains five of the ten largest settlements in the province and is home to over 200,000 people.

The smaller communities in Newfoundland may often be referenced by the bay in which they are located, e.g.: 'Port de Grave, CB'.

== Geography ==
The bay indents the Avalon Peninsula, opening towards the Atlantic Ocean at its northeast. It is bounded by Cape St. Francis 47°48.63′N 52°47.15′W in the south and Split Point 48°05.99′N 52°50.94′W near Bay de Verde in the north. It has a maximum depth of 300 metres (980 ft).

Conception Bay covers an area of 1295 square kilometres and contains several islands, the three largest being Bell Island, Little Bell Island and Kellys Island. The Bay is fed by rivers from its east and west, which flow on into the Atlantic Ocean.

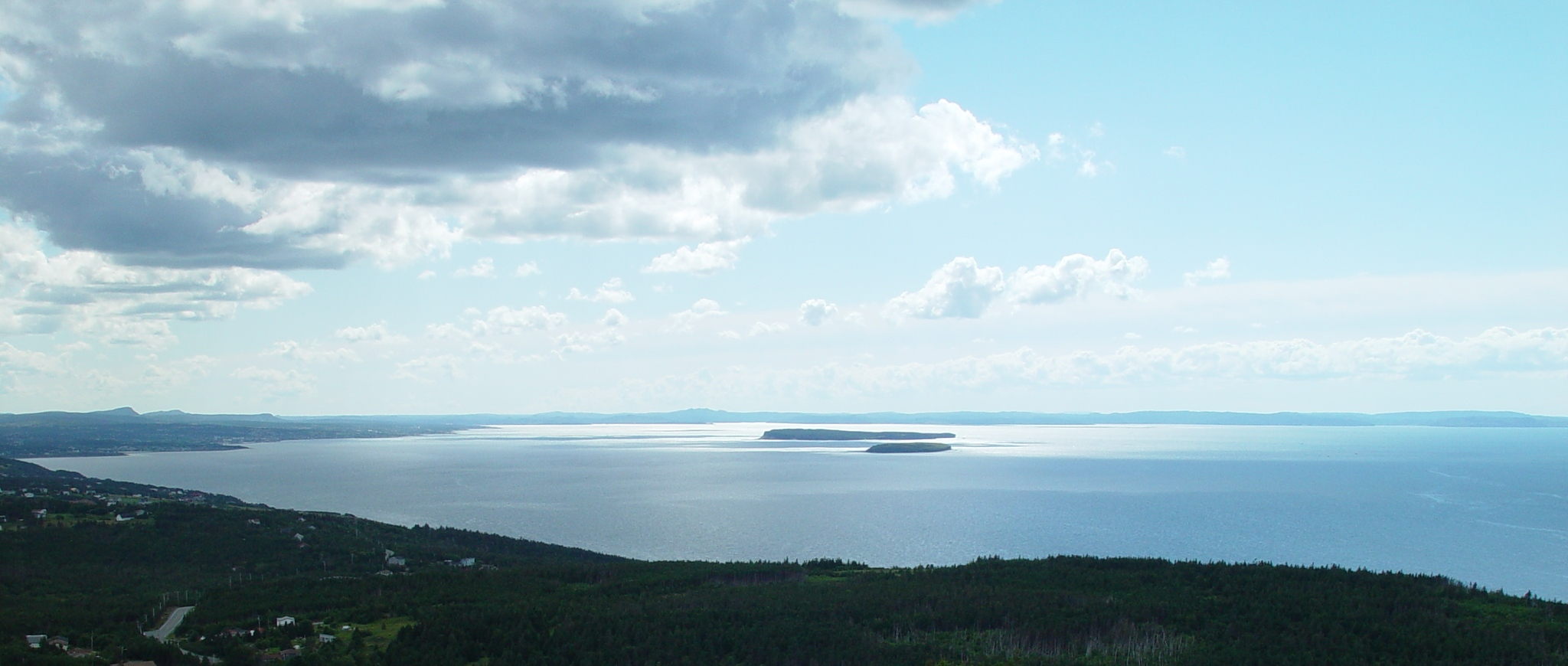
View of Conception Bay, looking southwest from Portugal Cove 47°36.50′N 52°51.34′W towards Holyrood. The larger island is Kellys Island and the smaller one is Little Bell Island.

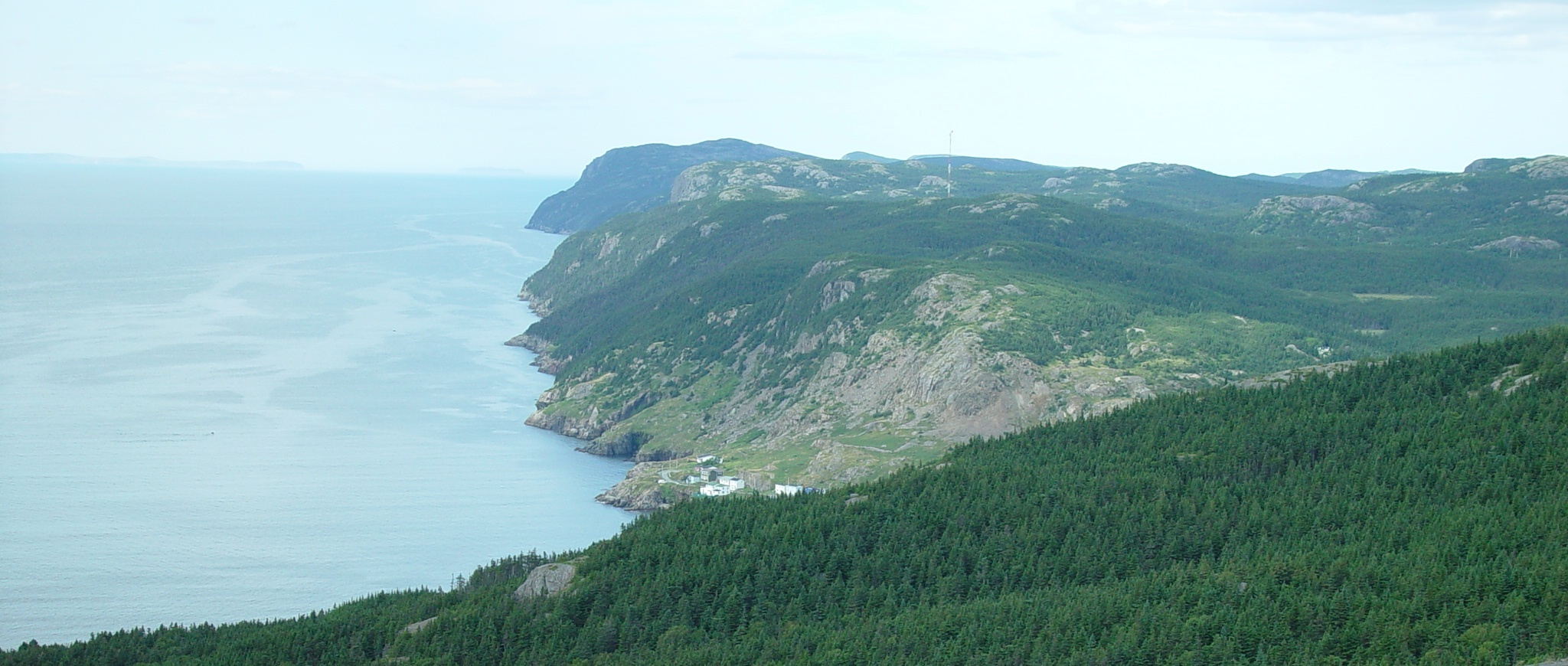
View of Conception Bay, Newfoundland and Labrador, looking north from Portugal Cove 47°36.50′N 52°51.34′W. Bay de Verde and Baccalieu Island can be seen in the distance.

== History ==
In 1501 and 1502, the Corte-Real brothers explored and charted Greenland and what is today the Canadian province of Newfoundland and Labrador, claiming these lands as part of the Portuguese Empire. The name Conception Bay comes from the Portuguese Baía da Conceição ("Bay of the Conception") and was presumably given in honour of the Feast of the Immaculate Conception, December 8. The name first appears on the Oliveriana (Pesaro) map of around 1504–1505.

Conception Bay was the site of Britaniola Colony, established in 1610. It was the site of Sea-Forest Plantation founded in 1610 and Bristol's Hope Plantation founded in 1619. During the 1610s, the Bay was the hideout of the infamous Newfoundland based buccaneer, Peter Easton. Artifacts from the 17th-century planter era through the 19th century have been found, such as Spanish coins, one minted in Peru. There was trade between Newfoundland and Bilbao during the 17th century.

A rather famous story in its day was the following case: in 1873, a fishing boat and Theophilus Picot was in here, it were attacked by a giant squid.

From the late 1890s to the 1960s, Bell Island was home to an iron ore mine in Wabana, operated most recently by the Dominion Steel and Coal Corporation (DOSCO). The ore was shipped for processing to DOSCO's steel mill in Sydney, Nova Scotia.

During World War II, anchored DOSCO cargo ships, along with the loading pier at Wabana, were the target of Nazi U-boats on at least two occasions. The attacks occurred on 5 September 1942, when U-513 sank the British ship SS Saganaga and the Canadian ship Lord Strathcona, and on 2 November when U-518 sank the Free French ship P.L.M. 27 and the Canadian ship Rose Castle. During the first attack, aiming for the anchored ore carriers, a torpedo missed its target and struck the pier, making Bell Island one of the few places in North America to suffer a direct enemy attack (see Attacks on North America during World War II). The wrecks of the four cargo ships sunk during these two attacks are visible at low tide; a memorial on shore is dedicated to the 69 merchant sailors who lost their lives.

Since 2011 Memorial University of Newfoundland has been conducting archaeological excavations at Carbonear bordering the bay.

== Other information ==
The provincial government operates a passenger-vehicle ferry service from Bell Island to Portugal Cove (on the bay's southeastern shore), operating through what locals know as the "Bell Island Tickle."

Humpback whales have been known to enter the bay while migrating. Private vessels and tourist charters frequent the bay's waters during the summer months.

Property development in the St. John's exurb of Conception Bay South in recent decades has led to increasing recreational use of the bay.
