= North River, Newfoundland and Labrador =

North River
- Town
- Location of North River in Newfoundland and Labrador
- Coordinates: 47.51°N 53.29°W
- Country: Canada
- Province: Newfoundland and Labrador

Population (2021)
  - Total: 579
- Time zone: UTC-3:30 (Newfoundland Time)
  - Summer (DST): UTC-2:30 (Newfoundland Daylight)
- Area code: 709
- Highways: Route 70; Route 75

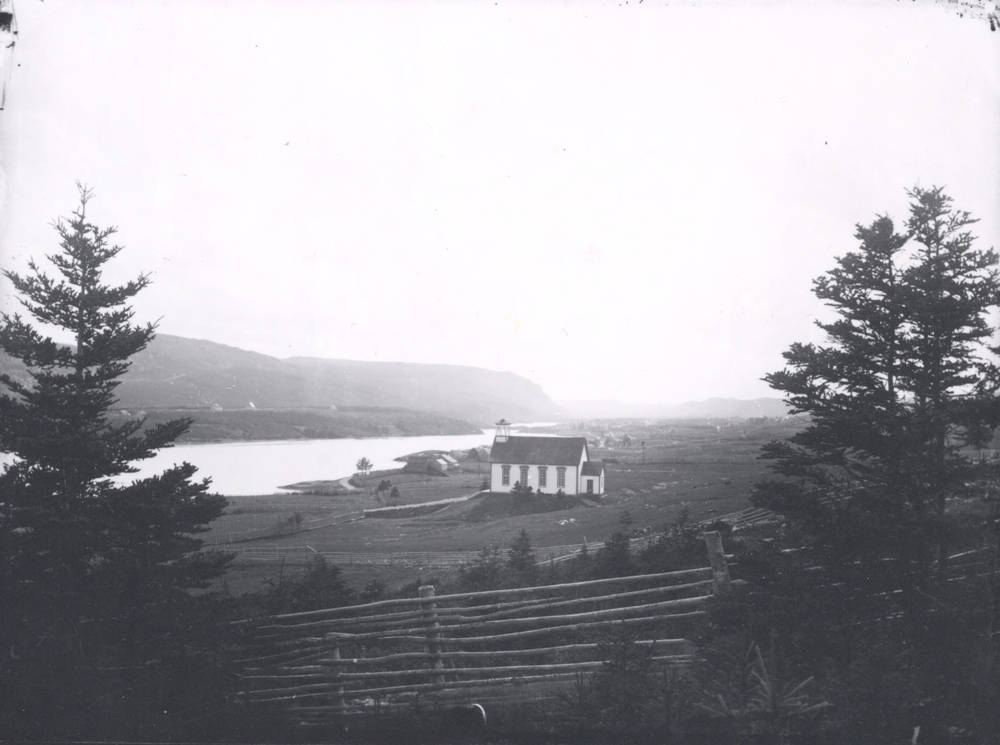
North River, undated photo, 19th century.

North River is a town on the Avalon Peninsula of Newfoundland in the Canadian province of Newfoundland and Labrador. It was incorporated as a municipality in 1964.

== Geography ==
The Town of North River is located northwest of Clarke's Beach, Conception Bay, Newfoundland. The settlement extends along the northwest bank of the river of the same name, and includes Halls Town, located south of what was formerly Fillier's Bridge, further inland along the river valley.

== History ==
In the early 1600s, colonist John Guy of the Cupids plantation referred to people living in the Clarke's Beach area, which could have included North River or South River. Permanent settlement, however, most likely started in the mid 1800s. Historically, what is now called North River was known as Northern Gut, while the name North Valley also appears on some maps.

North River has traditionally been a fishing and agricultural community. It is probable that Northern Gut and the valley of the North River as far inland as The Pond That Feeds the Brook were early sites of winter houses or summer gardens for fishing communities on the Port de Grave peninsula. Many of the year-round settlers in the North River valley were fishermen of Irish descent who had been employed by English merchants and planters on the Peninsula. Local oral tradition holds that the early Roman Catholic settlers had been driven out of the Peninsula, but it is more likely that by the mid 1800s, the families of the original Irish fishing servants had saved enough money to facilitate a move to the riverside farmlands, where they already cultivated gardens.

The census records published in the Journal of the Legislative Council of the Island of Newfoundland for 1833 noted that there were 36 dwelling houses in Northern Gut at that point, with 101 men, 103 women, 27 servants, and 4 fishing boats.

Grave markers in the North River cemetery date back to 1870, but many of the original Irish settlers were buried in the older cemeteries of Bareneed and Port de Grave.

Access to North River was originally always by water, but in 1836 a road was built from Northern Gut to Collier's Bay (today's Colliers). This road joined up with the road from Collier's Bay to Holyrood, providing the first land transportation link into Conception Bay North. The local Road Commissioners at the time were Thomas Ridley, Thomas Chancey, John Elson, and John Stark. In the same year, tenders were called for the building of a road northward, stretching from Northern Gut to Riverhead, Harbour Grace. The bridge over North River was completed around the same time, at a cost of £100.

In 1839, Joseph Jukes, an English geologist and surveyor for Newfoundland, made a visit to Northern Gut while exploring local slate deposits. For June 21, 1839, Jukes wrote the following in his diary:

Here a brook empties itself into the sea having run for about three miles through a narrow pond or “cosh” as my men called it. We hauled the boat up the shallow bed of the brook for a few yards into deeper water and then rowed up the lake. I then struck off with two men and the theodolite and barometer to the top of a hill on the north side called “Sunday's hill” whose height I found to be about 500 feet.

Improved roads and an influx of settlers meant that by 1840 there was enough settlement in the Valley to justify the establishment of a Roman Catholic school.

By 1857, the combined population of Hall's Town and North River was 335, with Roman Catholic families clustered at North River. Protestants (most notably the Hall family) settled further inland. While early settlers chose the area for agricultural purposes, a group of later settlers moved into the area as waterfront property at Clarke's Beach became limited. By the 1860s, residents were combining farming with the Labrador fishery out of Port de Grave and Bay Roberts. Some of the nineteenth century pioneer families moved away to Philadelphia and Boston, but quite a number stayed on.

In 1870–1871, the following family names were in North River: Atkins; Brine; Butler; Cooney; Cullen; Cummins; English; Farrell; Hanlin; Hurley; Kavanagh; Lawless; Long; Moore; Morgan; Morrisy; Neville; O’Brien; Power; Ring; Shea; Sinclair; Skean; Swords; and Walsh. They were all listed as fishermen, planters, and farmers.

The Labrador fishery, farming, and woods work provided most work for late nineteenth-century residents.

The Bell Island mines offered a new type of employment starting in the early 1900s, and in the 1940s many also worked on the construction of the United States base at Argentia.

At this time, Bern English opened the first shop in North River.

Family farming for household needs remained an important tradition in the area well into the twentieth century. In 1986, Clarke's Beach merchant Garfield Ralph remembered locals growing “thousands of barrels of potatoes a year. When I was a boy everybody in Clarke's Beach, North River and South River grew from 10 to 150 barrels of potatoes."

Early family names of North River still common in 1992 included Bradbury, Fillier, Hall, Hanlon, Morgan, Morrissey, Newell, Power, and Snow.

== Demographics ==
In the 2021 Census of Population conducted by Statistics Canada, North River had a population of 579 living in 261 of its 318 total private dwellings, a change of 1.6% from its 2016 population of 570. With a land area of 4.2 km^{2} (1.6 sq mi), it had a population density of 137.9/km^{2} (357.0/sq mi) in 2021.

== See also ==
- List of cities and towns in Newfoundland and Labrador
