= Newfoundland and Labrador Route 70 =

Highway in Newfoundland and Labrador, Canada

Route 70
- Roaches Line; Conception Bay Highway

Route information
- Maintained by Newfoundland and Labrador Department of Transportation and Infrastructure
- Length: 109 km (68 mi)

Major junctions
- South end: Route 75 in Roaches Line
- Route 60 / Route 71 in Cupids; Route 72 in Bay Roberts; Route 73 in Tilton; Route 75 in Carbonear; Route 74 in Victoria; Route 80 in Old Perlican
- North end: Bay de Verde

Location
- Country: Canada
- Province: Newfoundland and Labrador

Highway system
- Highways in Newfoundland and Labrador
← Route 63	→ Route 71

Route 70, also known as Roaches Line and Conception Bay Highway, is a 109-kilometre-long (68 mi) north-south highway on the Avalon Peninsula of Newfoundland. The highway also carries the designation of Baccalieu Trail for its entire length.

== Route description ==
Route 70 begins in Roaches Line at an interchange with Route 75 (Veterans Memorial Highway), just a short distance north of Route 1 (Trans Canada Highway). It heads north through rural wooded to come enter Cupids, where it has an intersection with Route 60 (Conception Bay Highway) and Route 71 (Hodgewater Line), where Route 70 takes on the name Conception Bay Highway from Route 60. The highway begins following the coastline as it passes through South River, Clarke's Beach, and North River before passing through Bay Roberts, where it has an intersection with Route 72 (Port de Grave Road). Route 70 now passes through Spaniard's Bay and Tilton, where it has an intersection with Route 73 (Back Track Road), before winding its way through hilly terrain to pass through Harbour Grace. The highway now travels more inland as it meets the northern end of Route 75 (Veterans Memorial Highway) before bypassing Carbonear along its west side. Route 70 now passes through Victoria, where it makes a sharp right at an intersection with Route 74 (Heart's Content Highway), to turn east and pass through Salmon Cove. It now follows the coastline again and very windy as it passes through Perry's Cove, Kingston, Small Point-Adam's Cove-Blackhead-Broad Cove, Western Bay, Ochre Pit Cove, Northern Bay, Gull Island, Burnt Point, Job's Cove, Lower Island Cove, and Caplin Cove. The highway now turns inland again through grasslands to enter Old Perlican and have an intersection with Route 80 (Trinity Road/Blow Me Down Road). Route 70 turns east through rural areas for several kilometres to have intersections with Grates Cove Road and Red Head Cove Road before entering Bay de Verde along Main Road. It winds its way south through town to come to an end at Bay de Verde's harbour.

== Major intersections ==
Location	km	mi	Destinations	Notes
Roaches Line	0.0	0.0	Route 75 (Veterans Memorial Highway) to Route 1 (TCH) – Makinsons	Interchange; southern terminus; begins as Roaches Line
South River-Cupids town line	12.3– 12.4	7.6– 7.7	Route 60 east (Conception Bay Highway) – Brigus, Colliers; Route 71 south (Hodgewater Line) – Makinsons	Western terminus of Route 60; northern terminus of Route 71; Route 70 becomes Conception Bay Highway
Clarke's Beach	14.2	8.8	Riverside Avenue to Kavanaghs Road - The Motion	
Clarke's Beach	15.6	9.7	Otterbury Road (Route 70-13) - Otterbury; North River Road (Route 70-62) - North River	
Bay Roberts	17.9	11.1	L.T. Stick Drive To Route 75 – Butlerville	
Bay Roberts	19.2	11.9	Route 72 east (Port de Grave Road) – Port de Grave	Western terminus of Route 72
Bay Roberts	20.9	13.0	Shearstown Road (Route 70-64) - Butlerville	
Spaniard's Bay	24.7	15.3	Bishop's Cove Shore Road - Bishop's Cove	
Spaniard's Bay	24.8	15.4	Brazils Hill (Route 70-17) - Upper Island Cove	
Tilton	26.7	16.6	Route 73 west (Back Track Road) to Route 75 – New Harbour	Eastern terminus of Route 73
Harbour Grace	30.0	18.6	Thicket Road (Route 70-18) - Upper Island Cove, Bryant's Cove	
Harbour Grace	31.9	19.8	South Side Road (Route 70-20) - Bryant's Cove	
Harbour Grace	32.6	20.3	Brynes Road To Route 75 (Veterans Memorial Highway) – Trans-Canada Highway	
Harbour Grace	38.2	23.7	Saddle Hill to Main Road - Bristol's Hope	
Carbonear	39.1	24.3	Route 75 south (Veterans Memorial Highway) to Route 1 (TCH) – Bay Roberts	Northern terminus of Route 75
Carbonear	42.4	26.3	Valley Road - Downtown	Interchange
Carbonear	45.8	28.5	Ridge Road (Route 70-30) - Freshwater	
Victoria	47.6	29.6	Route 74 west (Heart's Content Highway) – Heart's Content	Eastern terminus of Route 74
Caplin Cove, Conception Bay	93.1	57.8	Low Point Road (Route 70-54) - Low Point	
Old Perlican	96.8	60.1	Route 80 (Trinity Road/Blow Me Down Road) – Dildo, Downtown	Route 70 becomes Trinity Road
	104	65	Grates Cove Road (Route 70-61) - Grates Cove	
	105	65	Red Head Cove Road (Route 70-56) - Red Head Cove	
Bay de Verde	109	68	Dead End at Bay de Verde's harbour	Northern terminus
1.000 mi = 1.609 km; 1.000 km = 0.621 mi: Route transition
