= Newfoundland and Labrador Route 72 =

Highway in Newfoundland and Labrador, Canada

Route 72
- Port de Grave Road

Route information
- Maintained by Newfoundland and Labrador Department of Transportation and Infrastructure
- Length: 9.7 km (6.0 mi)

Major junctions
- West end: Route 70 in Bay Roberts
- East end: Pick Eyes

Location
- Country: Canada
- Province: Newfoundland and Labrador

Highway system
- Highways in Newfoundland and Labrador
| ← Route 71 | → Route 73 |

Route 72, also known as Port de Grave Road, is a short 9.7-kilometre-long (6.0 mi) east-west highway on the Port de Grave Peninsula of Newfoundland. It is the primary road access on-and-off the peninsula, with the only other road being Otterbury Road.

== Route description ==
Route 72 begins in Bay Roberts at an intersection with Route 70 (Conception Bay Highway). It heads east to pass through Coley's Point and Black Duck Pond to enter Bareneed, where it has an intersection with Otterbury Road. Google Maps and Google Earth erroneously label this portion as Bareneed Road, even though this is not the case. The highway now passes through downtown Hussey's Cove and Ship Cove before winding its way through hilly terrain as it bypasses Blow Me Down to the north. Route 72 now passes through Hibb's Cove and curves to the south to enter Pick Eyes, where it comes to a dead end in a neighbourhood along the coast.

== Major intersections ==
| Location | km | mi | Destinations | Notes |
|---|---|---|---|---|
| Bay Roberts | 0.0 | 0.0 | Route 70 (Conception Bay Highway/Baccalieu Trail) – Clarke's Beach, Carbonear | Western terminus |
| The Dock | 2.7 | 1.7 | Otterbury Road (Route 70-13) - Otterbury | |
| Ship Cove | 7.6 | 4.7 | Blow Me Down Road - Blow Me Down | |
| Pick Eyes | 9.7 | 6.0 | Dead End at a cul-de-sac | Eastern terminus |
1.000 mi = 1.609 km; 1.000 km = 0.621 mi
