= Newfoundland and Labrador Route 75 =

Highway in Newfoundland and Labrador, Canada

Route 75
- Veterans Memorial Highway
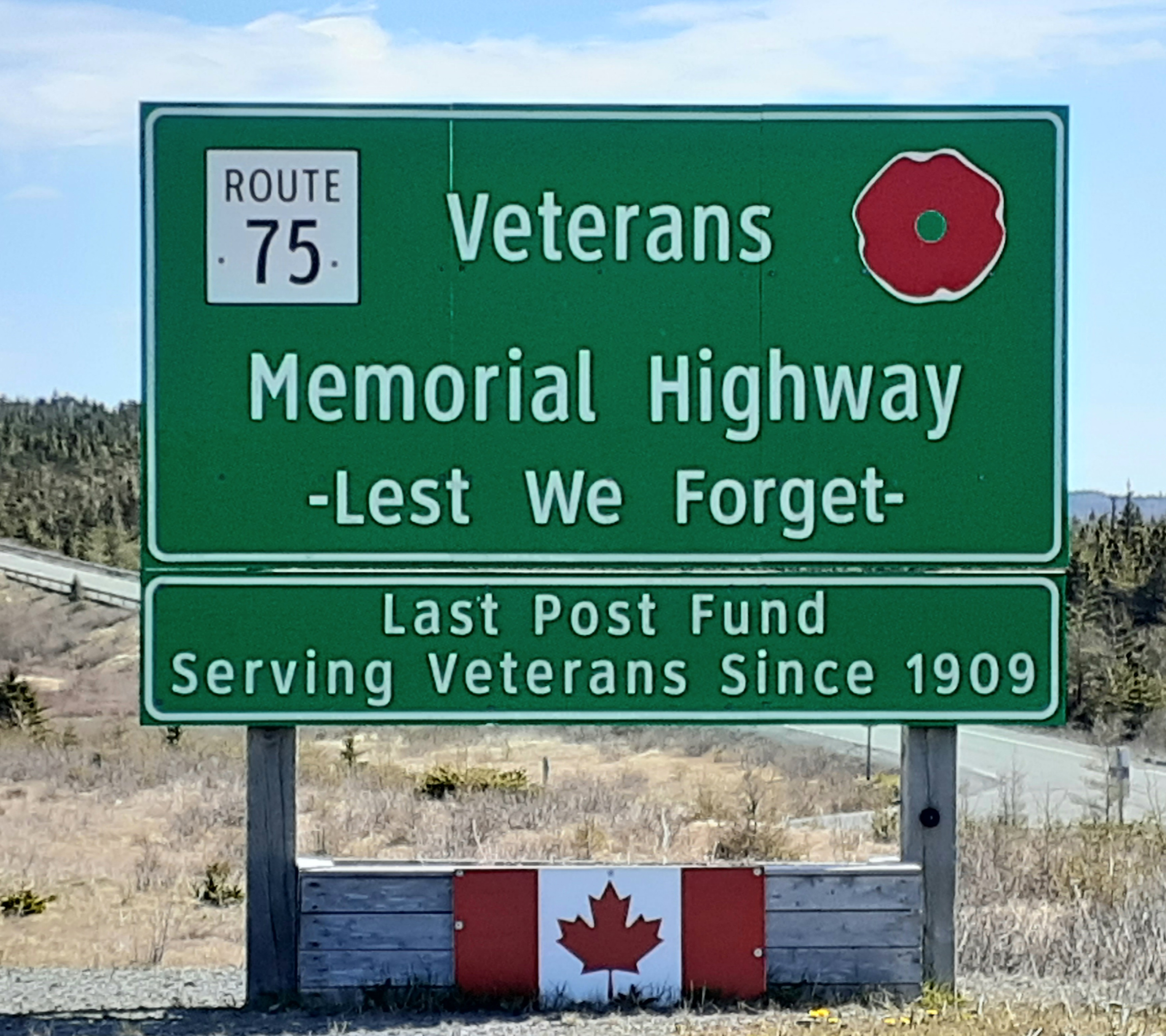

Route information
- Maintained by Newfoundland and Labrador Department of Transportation and Infrastructure
- Length: 38.5 km (23.9 mi)

Major junctions
- South end: Route 1 (TCH) in Roaches Line
- Route 70 in Roaches Line; Route 71 in Makinsons; Route 73 in Tilton
- North end: Route 70 in Carbonear

Location
- Country: Canada
- Province: Newfoundland and Labrador

Highway system
- Highways in Newfoundland and Labrador
← Route 74	→ Route 80

Route 75, also known as Veterans Memorial Highway, is a two-lane expressway on the Avalon Peninsula of Newfoundland. The route begins at a trumpet interchange with Route 1 and continues north, bypassing communities along the western shore of Conception Bay until it ends at a junction with Route 70 south of Carbonear. Construction of the highway was completed in 2002.

The entire route of Route 75 is a two-lane Freeway, with interchanges at all but the northernmost intersections, with those still having controlled access.

== Route description ==
Route 75 begins at an interchange with Route 1 (Trans Canada Highway, Exit 31) in Roaches Line. It heads north to have an interchange with the southern end of Route 70 (Roaches Line) before leaving the community of Roaches Line and passing northwest through rural wooded areas. The highway has an interchange with Route 71 (Hodgewater Line) in Makinsons before passing through North River, where it has a partial interchange with North River Road. Route 75 now heads north through western portion of Bay Roberts, where it passes by a Rest Area/Visitor information center and has an interchange with Country Road. It then passes through the west sides of Spaniard's Bay, where it has a partial interchange with New Harbour Road, and Tilton, where it has its last full interchange with Route 73 (Back Track Road). The highway now turns northeast to enter Harbour Grace, where it comes closer to the coast as it has a controlled access at-grade intersection with Brynes Road. Route 75 comes to an end at the northern end of town at an at-grade intersection with Route 70 (Cathedral Street/Columbus Drive), with the road continuing north into Carbonear as Route 70.

== Exit list ==
All exits are unnumbered.

Location	km	mi	Destinations	Notes
Roaches Line	0.0	0.0	Route 1 (TCH) – St. John's, Clarenville, Gander	Southern terminus of Route 75; Route 1 (TCH) exit 31
Roaches Line	1.4– 2.2	0.87– 1.4	Route 70 north (Roaches Line) – Roaches Line, Cupids, Brigus	Southern terminus of Route 70
Makinsons	8.0– 8.6	5.0– 5.3	Route 71 (Hodgewater Line) – Makinsons, South River	
North River	13.8	8.6	North River Road - North River	Northbound exit, southbound entrance
Bay Roberts	19.1– 19.9	11.9– 12.4	Country Road - Bay Roberts	Access to Bay Roberts via L.T. Stick Drive
Spaniard's Bay	23.6	14.7	New Harbour Road - Spaniard's Bay	At-grade intersection; partially controlled access via access road and overpass
Tilton	25.5– 26.1	15.8– 16.2	Route 73 (Back Track Road) – Tilton	
Harbour Grace	33.1	20.6	Brynes Road - Harbour Grace	At-grade intersection; access road
Carbonear	38.5	23.9	Route 70 (Cathedral Street/Columbus Drive) – Carbonear, Harbour Grace	At-grade intersection; northern terminus of Route 75
1.000 mi = 1.609 km; 1.000 km = 0.621 mi: Incomplete access
