= Newfoundland and Labrador Route 71 =

Highway in Newfoundland and Labrador, Canada

Route 71
- Hodgewater Line

Route information
- Maintained by Newfoundland and Labrador Department of Transportation and Infrastructure
- Length: 12.8 km (8.0 mi)

Major junctions
- West end: Route 1 (TCH) near Whitbourne
- Route 75 (Veterans Memorial Highway) at Makinsons
- East end: Route 60 / Route 70 at the South River - Cupids town line

Location
- Country: Canada
- Province: Newfoundland and Labrador

Highway system
- Highways in Newfoundland and Labrador
← Route 70	→ Route 72

Route 71 (also known as Hodgewater Line) is a highway in the Canadian province of Newfoundland and Labrador. It serves as a bypass road to Route 70 and Route 75 (Veterans Memorial Highway). Upon exiting Route 1, it is a dirt road until just before the access to Route 75. There is an abundance of summer cottages along the route, and the route terminates at South River in Conception Bay on Route 70.

Route 71 is one of only two known provincial highways whose dirt road portions are accessible in street view on Google Maps and Google Earth (the other being Route 91).

== Major intersections ==
Location	km	mi	Destinations	Notes
	0.0	0.0	Route 1 (TCH) – Clarenville, St. John's	Exit 30 on Route 1; southern terminus; Route 71 begins unpaved
Makinsons	5.7	3.5	Route 75 (Veterans Memorial Highway) – Bay Roberts, Trans-Canada Highway	Interchange; Route 71 becomes paved
South River-Cupids town line	12.8	8.0	Route 70 (Roaches Line/Conception Bay Highway/Baccalieu Trail) – Bay Roberts, Carbonear, Roaches Line; Route 60 east (Conception Bay Highway) – Cupids, Brigus	Northern terminus; western terminus of Route 60
1.000 mi = 1.609 km; 1.000 km = 0.621 mi
