= Henry Dawe (politician) =

Newfoundland politician (1850–1921)

Captain Henry Dawe MHA

Member of the Newfoundland House of Assembly for Harbour Grace
- In office November 6, 1893 – October 28, 1897 Serving with Eli Dawe (1893–1897); Robert Munn (1893–1894); William Whiteway (1894–1897)
- Preceded by: William Whiteley
- Succeeded by: William Horwood; William Oke

Personal details
- Born: August 1850 Bay Roberts, Newfoundland Colony
- Died: December 17, 1921 (aged 70–71) Bay Roberts, Newfoundland
- Party: Conservative (1893–1897); Liberal (1904)
- Spouse: Naomi Parsons (m. 1874)
- Relatives: Charles Dawe (cousin); Edwin J. Godden (son-in-law)
- Occupation: Sealing captain

Henry Dawe (August 1850 – December 17, 1921) was a Newfoundland sealing captain and politician. A prosperous master mariner from Bay Roberts, he represented Harbour Grace in the Newfoundland House of Assembly (MHA) from 1893 to 1897 as a Conservative.

== Sealing career ==
Dawe was born in Bay Roberts, Conception Bay. He had become a master mariner by 1873 commanding the brigantine Escort. He was the captain of the Adventure, the first steel ship used in the Newfoundland seal fishery. By 1908, Dawe's crews had killed 435,909 seals over 29 seasons.

== Politics ==
Dawe was elected as a Conservative candidate for the district of Harbour Grace in the 1893 election. He served in the House of Assembly alongside his cousin Charles Dawe who represented the district of Port de Grave. Henry Dawe sought re-election in 1897, but although the Conservatives emerged victorious that year, Dawe and his colleagues lost to the Liberal ticket. In 1904, he contested his cousin's former district of Port de Grave as a Liberal candidate supporting Premier Robert Bond, but narrowly lost to incumbent Conservative MHA Alexander Mackay.

Dawe eventually retired from the seal fishery in 1908 amid failing health. He spent the rest of his life quietly in his hometown of Bay Roberts, where he died on December 17, 1921.
