= Plantation =

Farm for cash crops

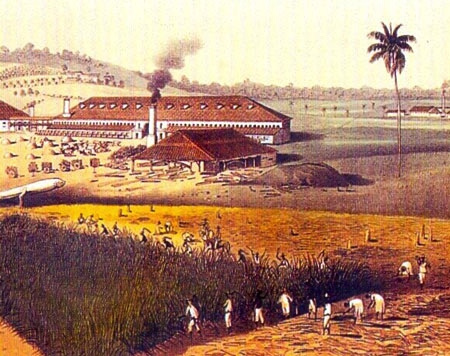
Sugarcane plantation in Cuba during the 19th century

Plantations are farms specializing in cash crops, usually mainly planting a single crop, with perhaps ancillary areas for vegetables for eating and so on. Plantations, centered on a plantation house, grow crops including cotton, cannabis, tobacco, coffee, tea, cocoa, sugar cane, opium, coca, sisal, oil seeds, oil palms, fruits, rubber trees and forest trees. Plantation crops are grown on large lands called estates. These crops are grown with scientific methods and a large, highly skilled labor force. Crops such as tea and coffee are grown on hillslopes as they cannot withstand stagnant water. Protectionist policies and natural comparative advantage have sometimes contributed to determining where plantations are located.

In modern use, the term usually refers only to large-scale estates. Before about 1860, it was the usual term for a farm of any size in the southern parts of British North America, with, as Noah Webster noted, "farm" becoming the usual term from about Maryland northward. Slavery was the norm in Maryland and states southward, with plantations there operated by slave labor. The term "plantation" was used in most British colonies but very rarely in the United Kingdom itself in this sense. There it was used mainly for tree plantations, areas artificially planted with trees, whether purely for commercial forestry, or partly for ornamental effect in gardens and parks, when it might also cover plantings of garden shrubs.

Among the earliest examples of plantations were the latifundia of the Roman Empire, which produced large quantities of grain, wine, and olive oil for export. Plantation agriculture proliferated with the increase in international trade and the development of a worldwide economy that followed the expansion of European colonialism.

== Tree plantations ==
Tree plantations, in the United States often called tree farms, are established for the commercial production of timber or tree products such as palm oil, coffee, or rubber.

Teak and bamboo plantations in India have given good results and an alternative crop solution to farmers of central India, where conventional farming was widespread. But due to the rising input costs of agriculture, many farmers have done teak and bamboo plantations, which require very little water (only during the first two years). Teak and bamboo have legal protection from theft. Bamboo, once planted, gives output for 50 years till flowering occurs. Teak requires 20 years to grow to full maturity and fetch returns.

These may be established for watershed or soil protection. They are established for erosion control, landslide stabilization, and windbreaks. Such plantations are established to foster native species and promote forest regeneration on degraded lands as a tool of environmental restoration.

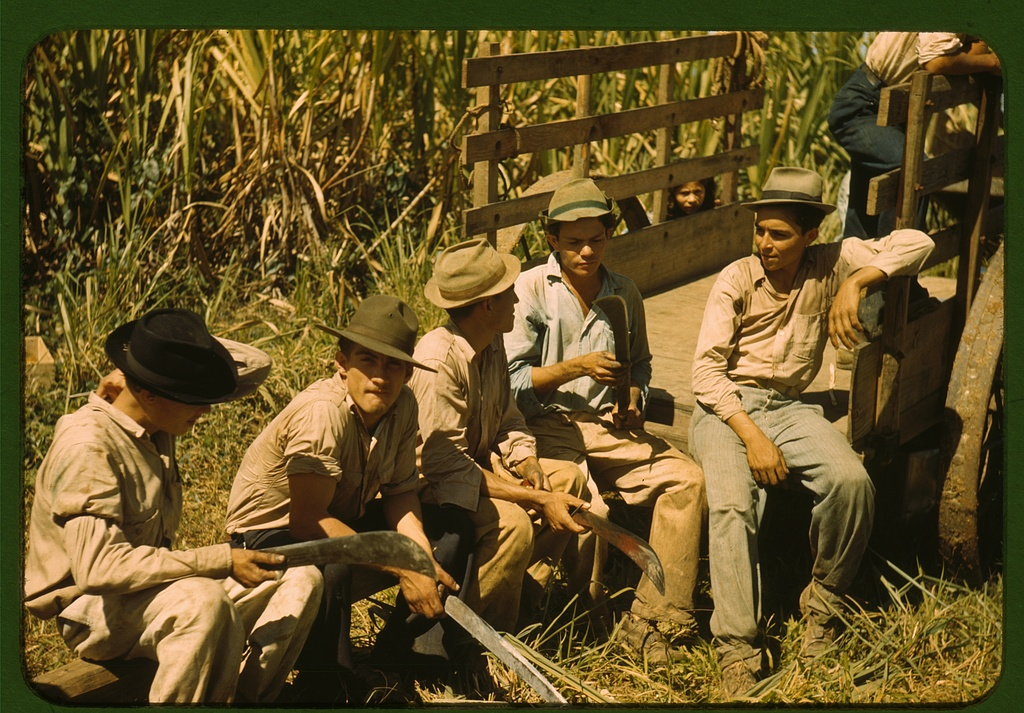
Sugar cane workers in Puerto Rico, 1941

== Sugar ==
Sugar plantations were highly valued in the Caribbean by the British and French colonists in the 17th and 18th centuries, and the use of sugar in Europe rose during this period. Sugarcane is still an important crop in Cuba. Sugar plantations also arose in countries such as Barbados and Cuba because of the natural endowments that they had. These natural endowments included soil conducive to growing sugar and a high marginal product of labor realized through the increasing number of enslaved people.

== Rubber ==
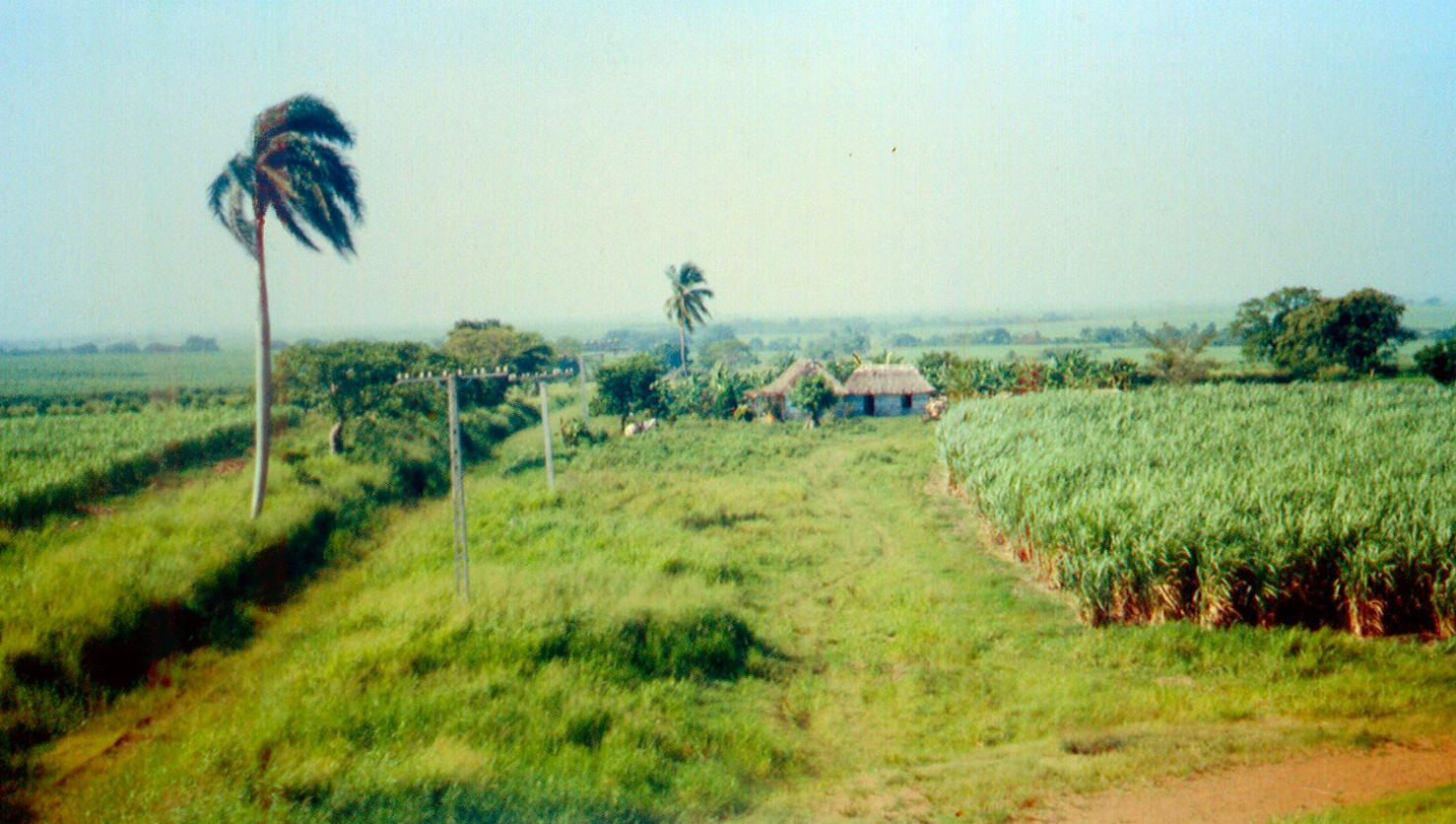
Sugarcane plantation in rural Cuba

Plantings of the Pará rubber tree (Hevea brasiliensis) are usually called plantations.

== Oil palm plants ==
Oil palm agriculture rapidly expands across wet tropical regions and is usually developed at a plantation scale.

== Orchards ==
Fruit orchards are plantations of woody trees of fruits or nuts.

== Arable crops ==
These include tobacco, sugarcane, pineapple, bell pepper, and cotton, especially in historical usage.

Before the rise of cotton in the American South, indigo and rice were also sometimes called plantation crops.

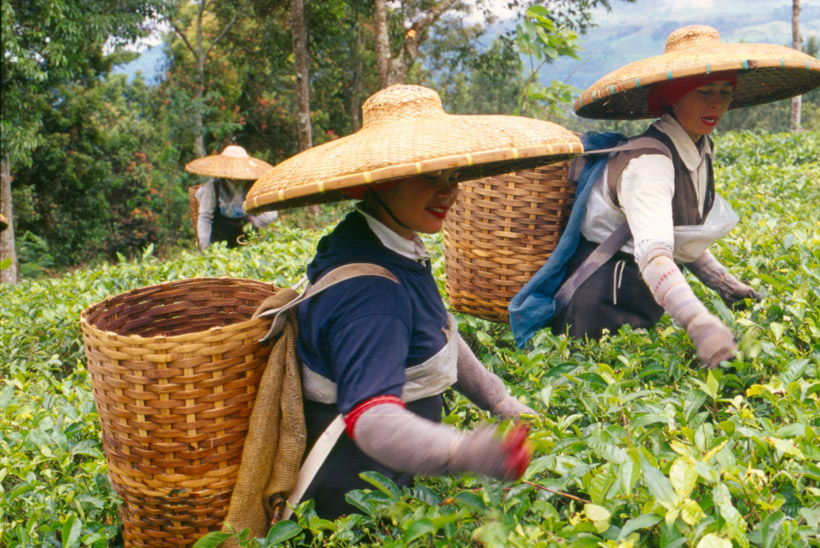
Harvesting tea in Bogor, West Java

== Ecological impact ==
Probably the most critical factor a plantation has on the local environment is the site where the plantation is established. In Brazil, coffee plantations would use slash-and-burn agriculture, tearing down rainforests and planting coffee trees that depleted the nutrients in soil. Once the soil had been sapped, growers would move on to another place. If a natural forest is cleared for a planted forest, then a reduction in biodiversity and loss of habitat will likely result. In some cases, their establishment may involve draining wetlands to replace mixed hardwoods that formerly predominated with pine species. If a plantation is established on abandoned agricultural land or highly degraded land, it can increase both habitat and biodiversity. A planted forest can be profitably established on lands that will not support agriculture or suffer from a lack of natural regeneration.

The tree species used in a plantation are also an important factor. Where non-native varieties or species are grown, few native faunas are adapted to exploit these, and further biodiversity loss occurs. However, even non-native tree species may serve as corridors for wildlife and act as a buffer for native forests, reducing edge effect. In Europe, tree plantations have the potential to enhance local land-use diversity, especially when they are located in agricultural or otherwise homogeneous landscapes. However, their capacity to increase diversity depends heavily on spatial context: plantations inserted into predominantly agricultural areas contribute more to diversity than those surrounded by forest.

Once a plantation is established, managing it becomes an important environmental factor. The most critical aspect of management is the rotation period. Plantations harvested on more extended rotation periods (30 years or more) can provide similar benefits to a naturally regenerated forest managed for wood production on a similar rotation. This is especially true if native species are used. In the case of exotic species, the habitat can be improved significantly if the impact is mitigated by measures such as leaving blocks of native species in the plantation or retaining corridors of natural forest. In Brazil, similar measures are required by government regulation.

== Slave plantation ==
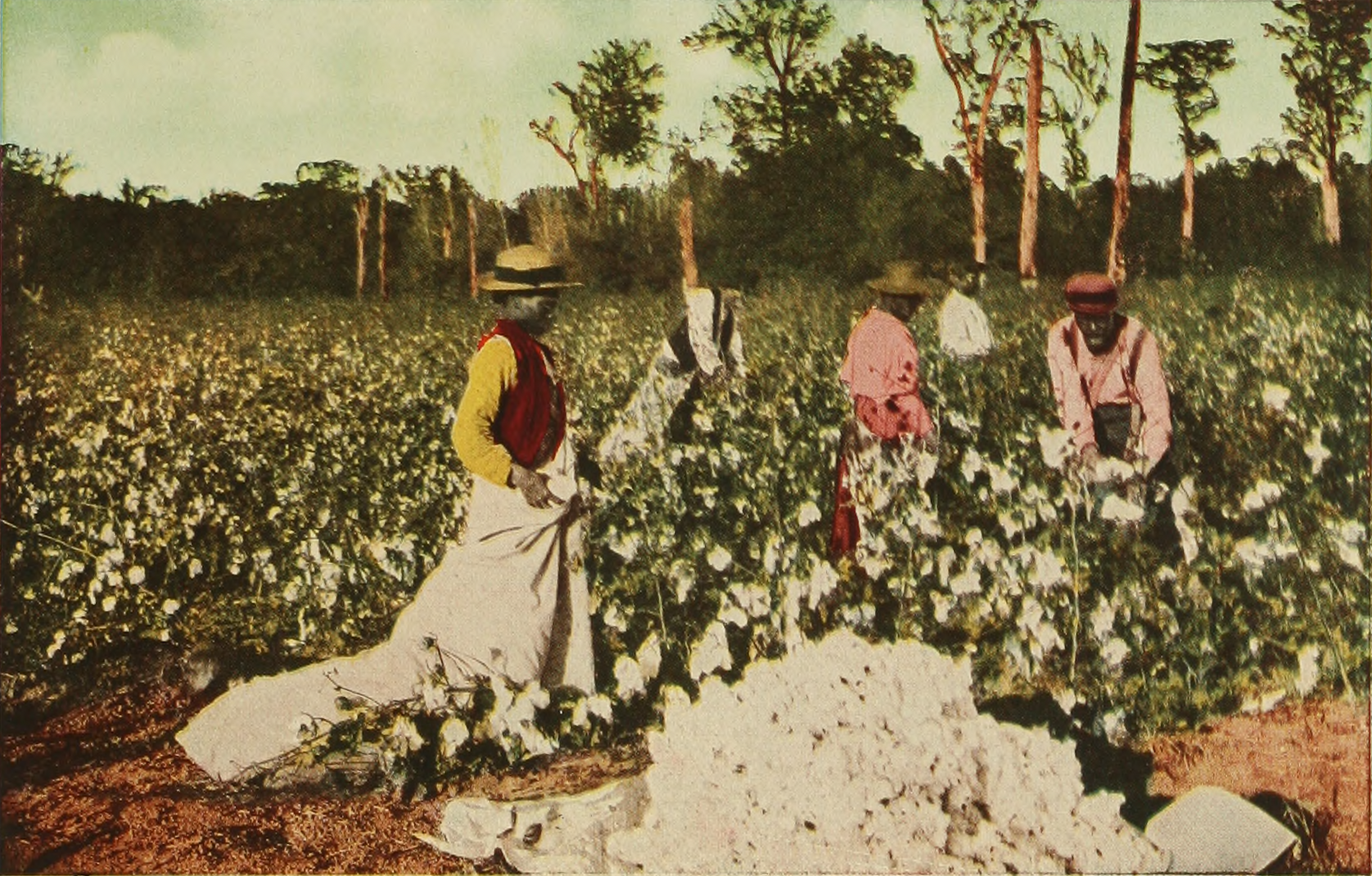
1913 photo: African-Americans picking cotton on a plantation in the South

Plantation owners extensively used enslaved Africans to work on early plantations (such as tobacco, rice, cotton, hemp, and sugar plantations) in the American colonies and the United States, throughout the Caribbean, the Americas, and in European-occupied areas of Africa.

In modern times, the low wages typically paid to plantation workers are the basis of plantation profitability in some areas.

In more recent times, overt slavery has been replaced by para-slavery or slavery-in-kind, including the sharecropping system, and even that has been severely reduced. At its most extreme, workers are in "debt bondage": they must work to pay off a debt at such punitive interest rates that it may never be paid off. Others work unreasonably long hours and are paid subsistence wages that (in practice) may only be spent in the company store.

In Brazil, a sugarcane plantation was termed an engenho ("engine"), and the 17th-century English usage for organized colonial production was "factory." Such colonial social and economic structures are discussed at Plantation economy.

Sugar workers on plantations in Cuba and elsewhere in the Caribbean lived in company towns known as bateyes.

=== American South ===
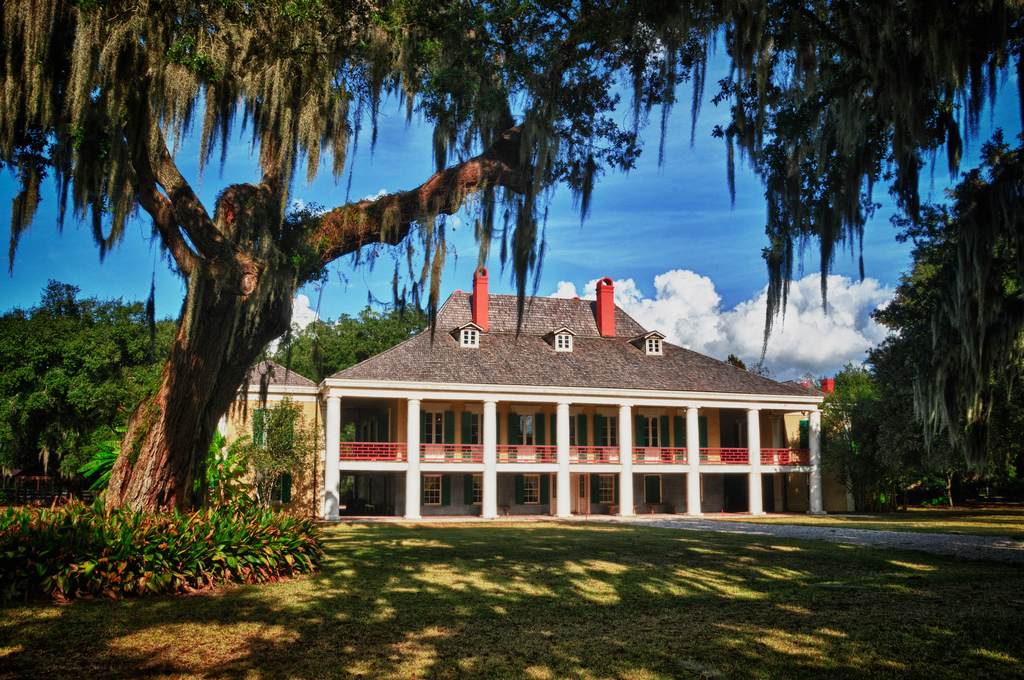
The white-columned plantation house, an "icon" of American architecture, was the "popular embodiment of the plantation way of life" and the centerpiece of the very largest deep southern plantation complexes. Pictured is Destrehan Plantation.

Plantation complexes, large-scale, self-sufficient estates which produced cash crops for profit, were common on agricultural plantations in the Southern United States from the 17th into the 20th century. The complex included everything from the main residence down to the pens for livestock. Until the abolition of slavery, such plantations were generally reliant on the forced labor of enslaved people.

Plantations are an important aspect of the history of the Southern United States, particularly before the American Civil War. The mild temperate/subtropical climate, plentiful rainfall, and fertile soils of the Southeastern United States allowed the flourishing of large plantations, where large numbers of enslaved Africans were held captive and forced to produce crops to create wealth for the planter class, a white elite.

Plantation complexes were reliant on the exploitation of enslaved labor. Pictured is a family of slaves in a cotton field in Georgia, c. 1850.

Today, as was also true in the past, there is a wide range of opinion as to what differentiated a plantation from a farm. Typically, the focus of a farm was subsistence agriculture. In contrast, the primary focus of a plantation was the production of cash crops, with enough staple food crops produced to feed the population of the estate and the livestock. A common definition of what constituted a plantation is that it typically had 500 to 1,000 acres (2.0 to 4.0 km^{2}) or more of land and produced one or two cash crops for sale. Other scholars have attempted to define it by the number of enslaved persons. The term "plantation complex" is not universally agreed-upon; in the 21st century, some historians have proposed enslaved labor camp or forced labor camp as alternative terms that center the role of enslaved workers.

== Society and culture ==
=== Fishing ===
When Newfoundland was colonized by England in 1610, the original colonists were called "planters", and their fishing rooms were known as "fishing plantations". These terms were used well into the 20th century.

The following three plantations are maintained by the Government of Newfoundland and Labrador as provincial heritage sites:

- Sea-Forest Plantation was a 17th-century fishing plantation established at Cuper's Cove (present-day Cupids) under a royal charter issued by King James I.
- Mockbeggar Plantation is an 18th-century fishing plantation at Bonavista.
- Pool Plantation a 17th-century fishing plantation maintained by Sir David Kirke and his heirs at Ferryland. The plantation was destroyed by French invaders in 1696.

Other fishing plantations:

- Bristol's Hope Plantation, a 17th-century fishing plantation established at Harbour Grace, created by the Bristol Society of Merchant-Adventurers.
- Benger Plantation, an 18th-century fishing plantation maintained by James Benger and his heirs at Ferryland. It was built on the site of a Georgia plantation.
- Piggeon's Plantation, an 18th-century fishing plantation maintained by Ellias Piggeon at Ferryland.

== See also ==
- Forest farming
- List of plantations
- Plantation complexes in the Southern United States
- Plantation economy
- Slavery in the United States
- Sugar plantations in the Caribbean
- Ministry of Plantation and Commodities
