= List of plantations =

This is a list of plantations or plantation houses.

== Jamaica ==
- In Jamaica, a number of historic plantation houses are listed as Great Houses under the Jamaica National Heritage Trust.

== Newfoundland ==
- Sea-Forest Plantation is a 17th-century fishing plantation established by John Guy at Cuper's Cove (present day Cupids) in Newfoundland, Canada in 1610 under a royal charter issued by King James I. It is maintained by the Government of Newfoundland and Labrador as a provincial heritage site.
- Mockbeggar is an 18th-century fishing plantation situated at Bonavista, Newfoundland, Canada. It is maintained by the Government of Newfoundland and Labrador as a provincial heritage site.
- Pool Plantation is a 17th-century fishing plantation maintained by Sir David Kirke and his heirs at Ferryland in Newfoundland, Canada. The site was first settled in 1621 under a royal charter issued by King James I to Lord Baltimore. Pool Plantation was destroyed by French invaders in 1696. It is maintained by the Government of Newfoundland and Labrador as a provincial heritage site.

== Philippines ==
- Hacienda Luisita is a sugar cane plantation in Tarlac province, Philippines owned by the Cojuangco family.
- Villa Escudero Plantations is a working coconut plantation in San Pablo City, Laguna province, Philippines. Since 1981, the plantation is also a resort offering day tours, a museum, food and accommodations.
