= Charles Dawe =

Newfoundland politician

The Honourable Captain Charles Dawe
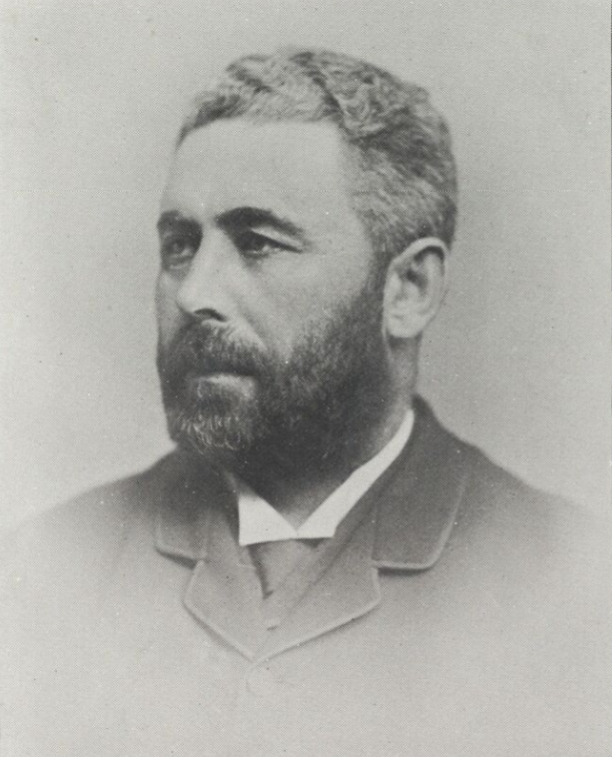
- Hon. Capt. Charles Dawe

Member of the Newfoundland House of Assembly for Port de Grave
- In office February 1, 1906 – 1908
- Preceded by: Alexander Mackay
- Succeeded by: William Warren
- In office November 6, 1893 – November 8, 1900
- Preceded by: James A. Clift
- Succeeded by: Alexander Mackay

Member of the Newfoundland House of Assembly for Harbour Grace
- In office November 9, 1878 – November 6, 1889 Serving with Ambrose Shea (1878–85); James S. Winter (1885–89); Joseph Godden (1885–89)
- Preceded by: Joseph Godden
- Succeeded by: William Whiteley; Eli Dawe; Robert Munn

Personal details
- Born: 8 February 1845 Port de Grave, Newfoundland Colony
- Died: 29 March 1908 (aged 63) St. John's, Newfoundland
- Party: Liberal (1878–82); Conservative (1882–1908)
- Spouse: Emma Bartlett
- Relatives: Henry Dawe (cousin)
- Occupation: Merchant

Charles Dawe (February 28, 1845 – March 29, 1908) was a merchant and political figure in Newfoundland. He represented Harbour Grace from 1878 to 1889 and Port de Grave from 1893 to 1900 and from 1906 to 1908 as a Conservative.

He was born in Port de Grave, the son of Captain Robert Dawe and Mary Anne Bartlett. Dawe was a sealing captain and operated a fishery supply business in Bay Roberts with his brother Azariah. He was a Liberal supporter until 1885. He served in the province's Executive Council as a minister without portfolio in 1894 and from 1897 to 1889. Dawe was defeated when he ran for reelection in 1889. He was elected in a 1906 by-election and served as leader of the Conservatives until he retired from politics in 1908. Dawe died in St. John's in 1908.
