= Mary Southcott =

Canadian nurse

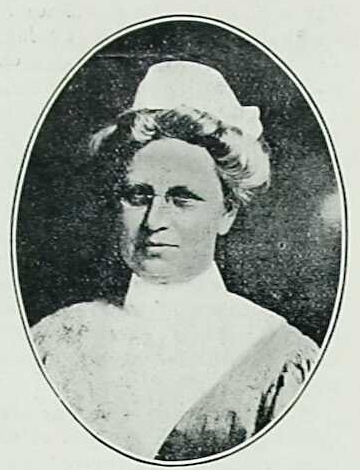
- Born: 1862; Newfoundland
- Died: 1943 (aged 80–81)
- Occupation: Nurse
- Employer: St. John's General Hospital

Mary Meager Southcott (1862–1943) was a Newfoundland-born nurse, hospital administrator and campaigner.

In 1899 Southcott went to London, England and trained as nurse under Eva Luckes between 1899 and 1901, at The London Hospital, in Whitechapel in the East End of London. Southcott left The London immediately after her training, but stayed in London to undertake midwifery training and gained the London Obstetrical Society Certificate before returning home.

Shortly after Southcott returned home she was appointed as superintendent of Nursing at the St. John's General Hospital, where she founded the St. John's General Hospital School of Nursing in 1903. She was interested in raising educational standards for nurses and, more generally, in the professionalisation of nursing. Southcott implemented Nightingale style nursing, which included the matron being autonomous for the nursing department. Her ideas brought her into conflict with the medical administrators of the hospital who preferred the old pre Nightingale style of nurse management. This led to a Royal Commission - a government enquiry, and she resigned in 1916 and was replaced by Myra Taylor.

In 1916 Southcott founded a Private Maternity Hospital in St. John's, and later that year, she was appointed by the Government as Matron of Donovan’s Hospital, St John’s Newfoundland.

Southcott also served on the Newfoundland Midwifery Board as well as serving as President of the Child Welfare Association. She set up a Nurses' Register and founded the Graduate Nurses’ Association of Newfoundland. She was a Member of Grace Maternity Hospital Association, Newfoundland, and helped design an eighteen-month midwifery programme.

She was also involved in various campaigns and organisations: in particular as president of the Child Welfare Association. Southcott was an advocate of women's suffrage and Member of the Ladies Reading Room and Current Events Club, St John’s, who promoted suffrage. She has been named a "person of national historic significance" by the Canadian government.
