= George Carpenter Whiteley =

Newfoundland sea captain and politician (1874–1961)

Captain George Carpenter Whiteley MHA
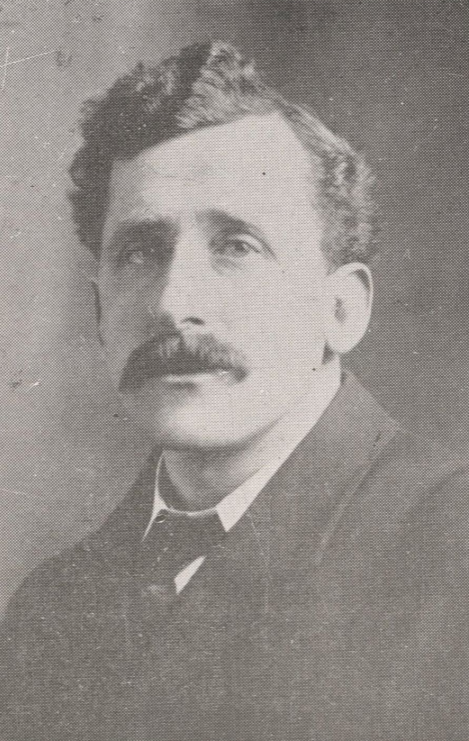
- Whiteley in 1930

Member of the Newfoundland House of Assembly for St. Barbe
- In office June 11, 1932 – February 16, 1934
- Preceded by: Walter Skanes
- Succeeded by: Reginald F. Sparkes (post-Confederation)

Personal details
- Born: November 7, 1874 Bonne-Espérance, Quebec, Canada
- Died: December 1, 1961 (aged 87) St. John's, Newfoundland, Canada
- Party: United Newfoundland
- Spouse: Mary T. Canning
- Children: 2
- Relatives: William Henry Whiteley (father)
- Education: Saint Bonaventure's College
- Occupation: Sealing captain

George Carpenter Whiteley (November 7, 1874 – December 1, 1961) was a ship's captain and politician in Newfoundland. He represented St. Barbe in the Newfoundland House of Assembly from 1932 to 1934 as a United Newfoundland Party member.

The son of W. H. Whiteley and Louisa Thompson, he was born in Bonne-Espérance, Quebec and was educated at the Methodist College and at Saint Bonaventure's College. He began sealing in 1890 and became master of the schooner Poppy in 1898, going on to captain several other ships. He was also involved in the management of the family business based in Bonne-Espérance, Quebec. He was elected to the Newfoundland assembly in 1932. He ran unsuccessfully to represent St. John's City East at the Newfoundland National Convention of 1946. Whiteley served as chairman of the International Grenfell Association for a number of years.

He married Mary T. Canning. Whiteley died in St. John's at the age of 87.
