= Clarke's Beach =

- Town
- Town of Clarke's Beach
- Location of Clarke's Beach in Newfoundland
- Coordinates: 47°32′41.00″N 53°16′56.49″W
- Country: Canada
- Province: Newfoundland and Labrador

Area
  - Total: 12.71 km^{2} (4.91 sq mi)

Population (2021)
  - Total: 1,400
  - Density: 122.6/km^{2} (318/sq mi)
- Time zone: UTC-3:30 (Newfoundland Time)
  - Summer (DST): UTC-2:30 (Newfoundland Daylight)
- Area code: 709
- Highways: Route 70
- Website: townofclarkesbeach.ca

A wood carving of the town seal of Clarke's Beach on display at Memorial University of Newfoundland.

Clarke's Beach is a town on Conception Bay in the Canadian province of Newfoundland and Labrador. In the 2021 census the town had a population of 1,400.

== History ==
Clarke's Beach first appears in census records in 1857, with a population of 280. Many of the early settlers came from Bareneed and Port de Grave when these two settlements ran out of space for curing fish and when the Labrador fishery became prominent. The first settlers initially came to the area for timber, then for planting vegetables on the cleared land.

=== Winter Home Registered Heritage Structure ===
Winter Home is a designated heritage building, designed and built by turn-of-the-century furniture maker Henry William Winter in 1919.

=== Drogheda (Valley of Hope) Registered Heritage Structure ===
This designated property, which was built by John Coveyduck in the mid 1800s, consists of a one-story house with a steeply pitched gable roof, a two-story barn, an outhouse and a well.

== Demographics ==
In the 2021 Census of Population conducted by Statistics Canada, Clarke's Beach had a population of 1,400 living in 599 of its 678 total private dwellings, a change of −10.1% from its 2016 population of 1,558. With a land area of 12.64 km^{2} (4.88 sq mi), it had a population density of 110.8/km^{2} (286.9/sq mi) in 2021.

== Sawmills ==
The earliest record of sawmilling activity in the area dates to circa 1611–1620, when the settlers of the John Guy colony in Cupids built a sawmill and pit saws in nearby South River. No further sawmills were built until 1885, when William and Reuben Horwood began a steam-operated sawmill at Clarke's Beach, a partnership which also had business dealings with Colin Campbell, a sawmill operator at Campbellton and Dog Bay, Notre Dame Bay. It employed 112 men in 1891, which, at the time, were nearly all the men in Clarke's Beach.

W.J. Horwood announced in January 1893 that he had sold his "Clarke's Beach Milling Plant" to George C. Jerrett. Jerrett took over the shingle and lumber mill business, producing shingles, laths, lobster cases, matched lumber, and clapboard. In 1895, it was reported that Jerrett's Mill was also producing spruce joists and studding. From 1894 to 1899 (at least), Jerrett also operated another shingle mill in Shoal Bay, Trinity Bay.

In the early 1900s, as the Horwoods moved their operations, at least two other mills opened. One mill was operated before 1909 by George Bussey.

George Wilson established a sawmill in 1943. Another water-powered mill owned by Wilson, but operated by Horwood's, was located on the main road in South River.

By the 1920s, fish casks and drums were being made as a side industry:

"Merchants would have schooner loads and carloads of birch sent here each spring from Bonavista Bay," recalls Garfield Ralph. "Shopkeepers would buy the material and give it out to people, stuff for heads, hoops, and staves. You would get 1,000 staves, enough to make 100 drums, and you would probably make 15 cents on each one. If you worked at it 10 hours a day you could make a dollar. Everybody in Clarke's Beach made fish drums until the '30s, but once the war started nobody would go at it."

In 1960, George Wilson was advertising as a "Lumber Manufacturer" and as a dealer in doors, window sashes, boxes, wallboard, and builder's hardware. By the 1970s it was the only sawmill in operation in the community.
