= Myra Louise Taylor =

Canadian nurse

Myra Louise Taylor (September 24, 1881 – January 8, 1939) was nursing superintendent at St John's General Hospital in Newfoundland from 1916 for more than twenty years. She had been one of the first people to be educated at, and graduate from, the recently founded School of Nursing there. As superintendent she also had responsibility for the School. She had spent two years in London, England doing additional training and became a member of pioneering UK nursing organisations. During her time as superintendent at the St. John's hospital she was made a Fellow of the British College of Nurses.

== Early life and education ==
She was born in Bay Roberts, Newfoundland, the youngest of nine children of Eliza Hannah Manston Calpin and Richard Henegar Taylor. Educated at Church of England Academy, Bay Roberts, in 1907 she went on to the new school of nursing in St. John's. Immediately upon her graduation in 1910, she was appointed head nurse of the surgical wards of the St. John's General Hospital. She resigned her position in October 1911 to study midwifery at Queen Charlotte Maternity Hospital, London where Taylor received the diploma of the Central Midwives Board of England and Wales. Taylor then went to St. Bartholomew's Hospital where she obtained a diploma in Swedish massage, returning to Newfoundland in August 1913.

== Career ==
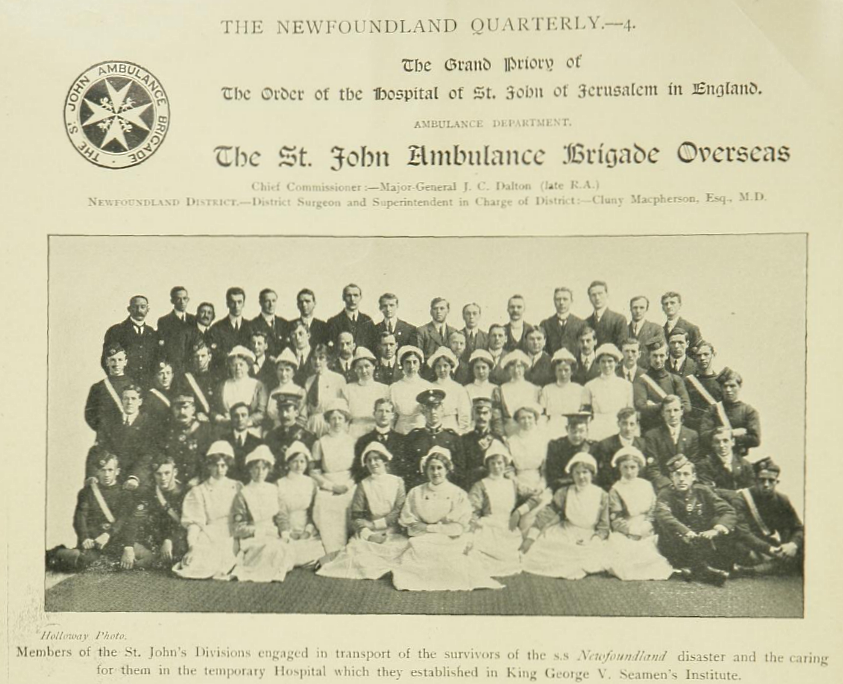
Myra Taylor is the central figure in the middle row amongst other members of the St. John Ambulance Brigade involved in caring for survivors of the SS Newfoundland sealing disaster.

Upon her return to Newfoundland she did private duty nursing and in 1914 she volunteered her services to the St. John Ambulance Brigade. When the SS Newfoundland sealing disaster happened she helped set up a temporary hospital where she and other Brigade members cared for survivors. Taylor was often employed by the St. John Brigade where she became divisional superintendent of the Avalon Nursing Division. Then on April 1, 1916, she was appointed to succeed Mary Southcott as Superintendent of Nurses and of the School of Nursing at the St. John's General Hospital.

She had extensive responsibilities as superintendent. Among other things she had to check the 120 beds on the wards and the nurses' home daily, and ensure all was running well with high standards of cleanliness. As well as preparing and giving three lectures a week in the School, she was responsible for applications, admissions, reports on nurses and duty rosters. She also had to take responsibility for supplies of linen, drugs, dressings and more. Early in her tenure, she expanded the School curriculum to include orthopaedics, ethics, and infectious diseases.

There were many stresses. Her predecessor had resigned after a disagreement with the management, and the administration was not generally supportive of Taylor's work. She was working against a background of great financial difficulty, World War I, poverty, disease and political upheaval. Her assistant resigned and so did the matron of the nurses' home. Taylor was expected to take up their duties for a small increase in salary, and ended up needing a year away from work in 1924–1925. While Taylor was absent the School of Nursing deteriorated so much that the hospital administrator suggested that it might need to be closed. A Royal Commission on Health and Public Charities reporting in 1930 on difficulties with health provision in Newfoundland discussed Taylor's position in 1930. It found that she was charged with a very wide range of duties, too "onerous" for one person. Taylor wanted to improve conditions for nurses by reducing their daily hours from fourteen to eight, as happened in other parts of North America, but this was not considered possible by the hospital. She petitioned the government on this issue in 1917 and 1919, but an eight-hour work day was only introduced in the 1950s.

In 1935 she received a King George V Silver Jubilee Medal and was congratulated on this by the British College of Nurses, with which she corresponded occasionally. When she died, her obituary in the St. John's Evening Telegram was reprinted in the British Journal of Nursing.

== Awards and memberships ==
- October 1923 - Her name entered on the rolls of the General Nursing Council of England and Wales.
- 1928 - Enrolled on the register of the British Nursing Association
- May 1932 - Named Fellow of the British College of Nurses (FBCN).
- 1935 - received King George V Silver Jubilee Medal
- President of the General Hospital Nurses Alumnae Association.
- 1919 at the inauguration of the Newfoundland Midwifery Board she was on the executive.
- Volunteer for Child Welfare Association.
- Volunteer for the Girls' Friendly Society.

== See also ==
- List of people of Newfoundland and Labrador
- List of communities in Newfoundland and Labrador
