= William Henry Whiteley =

Newfoundland politician and sea captain (1834–1903)

Captain William Whiteley MHA
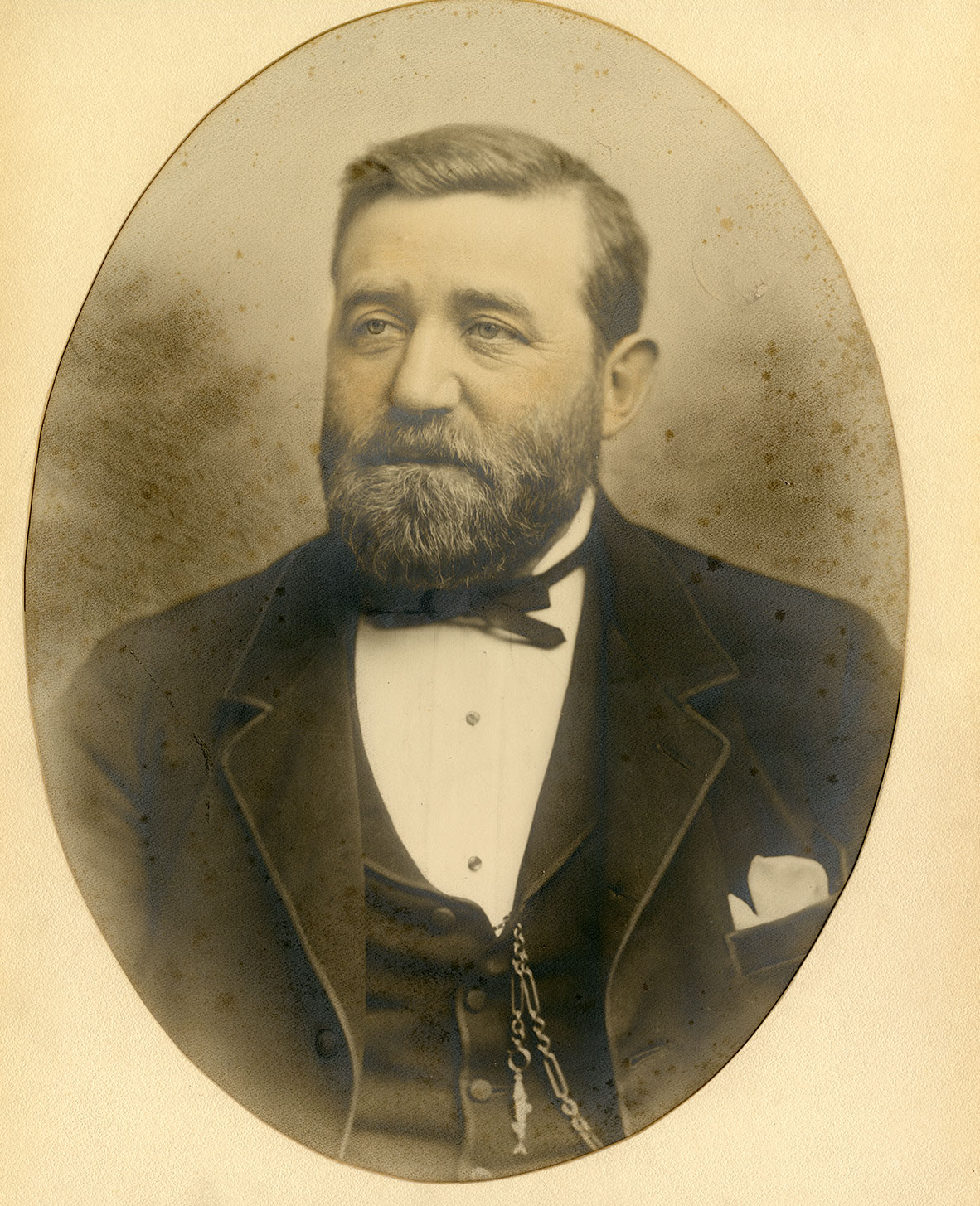

Member of the Newfoundland House of Assembly for Harbour Grace
- In office November 6, 1889 – November 6, 1893 Serving with Eli Dawe and Robert S. Munn
- Preceded by: Charles Dawe; Joseph Godden; James Winter
- Succeeded by: Henry Dawe

Personal details
- Born: June 5, 1834 Cambridge, Massachusetts, U.S.
- Died: August 18, 1903 (aged 69) St. John's, Newfoundland Colony
- Party: Liberal
- Spouse: Louisa Thompson (m. 1859)
- Children: George Carpenter Whiteley
- Occupation: Sea captain

William Henry Whiteley III (June 5, 1834 – August 18, 1903) was an American-born businessman, politician, and sea captain in Newfoundland. He is best known as the inventor in 1871 of the cod trap, a large box-like device with netting. It is an opening to which the cod are directed by a long net extending to the shore.

== Biography ==
Willian Henry Whiteley III was born on June 5, 1834, in Cambridge, Massachusetts, near Boston to William Henry Whiteley II (1812–1844) and Ann Marie Kelson (1812–1887). He was born into a prominent inventing family: his grandfather William Henry Whiteley (1790–1863) and his sons William II, Edward, and John had all been assistants in the family business which was based in Islington, London, where William had been working as an inventor for kitchen appliance makers. He also worked for a company experimenting with photography. Most of William's inventing was funded by his late father, William Whiteley, Squire of Morley (1754–1819).

After his son immigrated to Boston in the late 1830s, he and his two other sons soon followed and set up the family business. His son William later married and had children, one of them being William Henry Whiteley.

William's childhood was spent near Boston in Cambridge. He was the oldest child of the family and had four younger siblings Joseph ([1838), Louisa Mary (1840), and the twins Alfred James and Charles (1842). As a child he apprenticed as a printer for the American Traveller, his duty being to run to the ships that docked in the harbour and receive the latest news from Europe.

In 1844, his father, William II, was murdered crossing the Cambridge Bridge across the Charles River while returning from work. Thugs attacked him, took his earnings, and then threw him into the river, where he drowned without regaining consciousness.

William's mother, Marie, soom remarried to a fishing merchant, James Buckle (1813–1894). Not much later, the family sailed from Boston to the new family home in Labrador, where Buckle's family had been fishing since the mid-18th century. There, William began learning the trade of fishing from his stepfather, whom he called "Uncle Jack."

In 1858, William was called to England to receive an inheritance from his great-uncle, William Jury (1799–1851), consisting of a number of cottages and land parcels in the Manor of Overton in Hampshire. Upon arrival, William took up boarding with his grandmother's grandniece, Lydia Thompson, and her family. Staying there, Lydia's eldest daughter, Louisa, caught his eye, and he made a proposal of marriage to Louisa's father Charles, but after an extended argument l, William was banished from the house and was forced to seek lodgings. In his persistence, William eventually won Charles's approval and Louisa's hand. They were married in the Islington Chapel of the Congregationalists February 9, 1859. After being wed, William finished up their affairs, and they took a short honeymoon in Brighton. In April 1859 they sailed to St. John's, Newfoundland on a schooner bound for Bonne-Espérance, Quebec.

In Labrador, Whiteley used his inheritance to finance the beginning of his large scale fishing operations. The business employed a number of families in the cod, salmon, herring, and seal fisheries. Whiteley was the inventor of the Whiteley Cod Trap, which was in use until the decline of the cod fishery. He also enjoyed a successful career in politics by representing the district of Harbour Grace in the Newfoundland House of Assembly from 1889 to 1893. Whitely also served as fisheries inspector, postmaster, harbour master, and magistrate at Bonne-Espérance.

He died in August 1903 in St. John's, Newfoundland. After his death, his sons continued to operate the fishing station at Bonne-Espérance.
