= Robert Stewart Munn =

Scottish-born merchant and politician in Newfoundland (1829–1894)

Robert S. Munn MHA
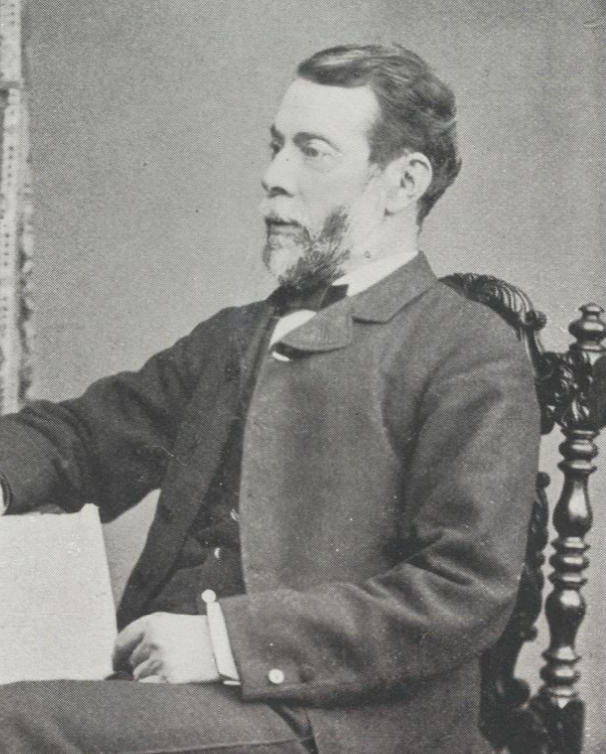
- Munn in 1894

Member of the Newfoundland House of Assembly for Harbour Grace
- In office November 6, 1889 – December 17, 1894 Serving with Eli Dawe (1889–1894); William H. Whiteley (1889–1893); Henry Dawe (1893–1894)
- Preceded by: Charles Dawe; Joseph Godden; James S. Winter
- Succeeded by: William Whiteway

Personal details
- Born: August 23, 1829 Buteshire, Scotland
- Died: December 17, 1894 (aged 65) Harbour Grace, Newfoundland Colony
- Party: Reform (1885–1889); Conservative (1889–1894)
- Spouse: Elizabeth Munden (m. 1862)
- Children: 9
- Relatives: John Munn (uncle); John Shannon Munn (cousin)
- Occupation: Merchant

Robert Stewart Munn (August 23, 1829 – December 17, 1894) was a Scottish-born merchant and politician in Newfoundland. He represented Harbour Grace in the Newfoundland House of Assembly as a Reform Party member from 1889 until his death in 1894.

== Business career ==
Munn was born on August 23, 1829 in Bute as the son of Dugald Munn, a banker, and Elizabeth (née Stewart) Munn. He came to Newfoundland in 1851 to join the firm of Punton and Munn, which was then owned by his uncle John Munn. In 1862, Munn became manager of the firm's operation in Harbour Grace. In the same year, he married Elizabeth Munden. In 1872, Munn and his cousin William Punton Munn became partners in the business, now known as John Munn and Company. When William went to England due to poor health in 1881, Munn became the sole manager.

== Politics ==
Munn was elected to the Newfoundland assembly in 1889 and reelected in 1893. A decline in the price of fish had resulted in accumulating debt for John Munn and Company during the 1890s. The Union Bank in St. John's, which held most of that debt, failed in the 1894 bank crash.

Munn died of pleurisy on December 17, 1894 in Harbour Grace at the age of 65. His estate was declared insolvent and the company went bankrupt soon afterwards. His son, William Azariah Munn, would later start his own prominent mercantile firm, and he would also gain renown as a historian.
