= Shearstown =

Community in Newfoundland and Labrador

Coordinates: 47°35′19″N 53°18′10″W

Location of Shearstown in Newfoundland and Labrador

Shearstown is a settlement in Newfoundland and Labrador. It is part of the Town of Bay Roberts. Shearstown Brook runs through the community to the Shearstown Estuary, then flowing into Spaniard's Bay. The brook valley consists largely of terraced sand and gravel deposits, likely deposited in an ice-distal glaciofluvial environment.

== History ==
Starting in the early 1800s, men from Mercer's Cove and French's Cove visited the area bordering Bay Roberts and Spaniard's Bay “chasing the wood,” a term meaning to collect winter firewood. Some families started to overwinter there, returning to Bay Roberts in the spring. Eventually, they settled there permanently.

Shearstown first appears separately in the Census in 1901, with a population of 577. By the 1921 Census, the population had grown to 704 persons in 145 households. The Shearstown pioneers included the families of Holmes, Earle, Hedderson, Badcock, Sparkes, Franey, French, Saunders, and Mercer. Originally known as Spaniard's Bay Pond, the name was changed to Shearstown in honour of the Reverend W.C. Shears in 1905. Shears was the Anglican priest at Bay Roberts (1868-1903) who also served at Spaniard's Bay; in 1903 he retired to the U.S.A. The community was also the birthplace of vernacular religious artist, Sister Ann Ameen (1909-1988).

During its early years, the most prosperous part of Shearstown was the area known as Muddy Hole, near the mouth of the Shearstown River. This was once a bustling trading place for the people of Shearstown and surrounding communities.

“People used to live in Muddy Hole. But they do not live there anymore,” Trudy Hutchings told folklore student Abigail Crocker in 2017. “I suppose they came up to be with the rest of the people. Water and sewer were not put through there, but I can remember as a small child, there were foundations and deteriorating fences down there.”

A visitor to the community in 1935 wrote,

One of the roads through Bay Roberts passes many prim little front gardens and emerges on the shore of Spaniard's Bay, which it skirts for a short way before crossing the Highroad to enter the settlement of Shearstown, and the New District of Harbour Grace. A placid stream flows along the valley and meets the sea just above the Railway trestle. There is a small island in this inlet; it is a charming islet, prettily wooded. There is a good road up the valley on the west side, and several branches cross the river to the homes on the other bank. This is a farming settlement whose neat cottages and smart barns show signs of the care and attention that have been bestowed upon them. The fields of fine vegetables and hay indicate industry if not prosperity. Picking blueberries in late August and September is one of the principal sources of income to many who dwell here. Farther in the road beyond the hamlet of Butlerville women and children dot the hills gathering the wild grape.

Most of Shearstown has been a part of the municipality of Bay Roberts since 1965; in 1992 Shearstown West and Butlerville were also included in the municipality. The main road was paved circa 1971, but in 1977, there were discussions about pulling out of municipal amalgamation. The area remains part of the Town of Bay Roberts.

== Businesses ==
Early settlers like Augustus Mercer worked in the fishery, while John and George Tetford set up a cooperage. From the early to mid 20th century, a number of shops were operated by families in the community: Bertram “Bert” and Bertha Dwyer's butcher shop; Doc's Store; Marjorie and Roy Saunders (who had a jukebox and sold ice cream and chips); Jim and Marcie Earle; Ned Holmes; William “Bill” Saunders; Zippy Dwyer; and Mary and Jesse Badcock (a confectionery store). James Holmes set up a general store, featuring everything from a post office to barrels of salt beef.

Carpenter George Parsons and his wife Jessie set up a small grocery in the community in 1949. Their daughter Della continued the business, moving across the street from the original store in 1985.

== Community Organizations ==
The first school and church in Shearstown were built in 1866, on the site occupied by St. Mark's School in 1994. The school was constructed as a one-room school, and rabbit and soup suppers were held to raise funds to supply coal and firewood for the building.

The original St. Mark's Anglican School was incorporated into the newer school, which was destroyed by arson in 2002. There was also a Methodist school/chapel by 1885. The current St. Mark's Church of England building was erected in 1898, and the first Methodist church in 1910 (replaced by a new Trinity United Church in 1962). A Pentecostal church was opened in 1953, with a new church under construction in 1994.

The Cromwell Loyal Orange Lodge No. 81, Shearstown, was constructed in 1898 and was dedicated with the name of Cromwell in 1901. It was one of the earlier community organizations to arrive in Shearstown. Its first master was Martin Sharpe. The Lodge is home to the Shearstown Brass Band, which was noted as having approximately 30 members ranging from young children to seasoned veterans in 2018.
