= Roaches Line =

Local service district in Newfoundland and Labrador, Canada

Coordinates: 47°28′23″N 53°17′02″W

Roaches Line is a local service district and designated place in the Canadian province of Newfoundland and Labrador. It is on the western side of Conception Bay and south of Bay Roberts.

Roaches Line (Route 70) connects the Conception Bay Highway (Route 60) at Cupids Crossing and South River with the Trans Canada Highway (Route 1) and Veterans' Memorial Highway (Route 75).

== Geography ==
Roaches Line is in Newfoundland within Subdivision M of Division No. 1. It is primarily a farming area.

== Demographics ==
As a designated place in the 2016 Census of Population conducted by Statistics Canada, Roaches Line recorded a population of 276 living in 118 of its 257 total private dwellings, a change of -1.1% from its 2011 population of 279. With a land area of 26.57 km^{2} (10.26 sq mi), it had a population density of 10.4/km^{2} (26.9/sq mi) in 2016.

== Attractions ==
Roaches Line is known for its landmark life-sized, weathervane horse statue atop a cliff, known locally at "The Look Out".

== Government ==
Roaches Line is a local service district (LSD) that is governed by a committee responsible for the provision of certain services to the community. The chair of the LSD committee is Morgan Russell.

== Notable people ==
- Joseph R. Smallwood, former premier
- Edward J. Russell, farmer
- Joseph R. Smallwood II, businessman

== See also ==
- List of communities in Newfoundland and Labrador
- List of designated places in Newfoundland and Labrador
- List of local service districts in Newfoundland and Labrador
