= Otterbury =

- Settlement
- Interactive map of Otterbury
- Country: Canada
- Province: Newfoundland and Labrador
- Time zone: UTC−3:30 (Newfoundland Time)
  - Summer (DST): UTC−2:30 (Newfoundland Daylight Time)
- Area code: 709

There are three areas called Otterbury in Conception Bay – one in Harbour Grace, one in Clarkes Beach, and one northeast of Carbonear. According to historian Gord Pike, the word was either a corruption of otter burrow, or a callback to Ottery St Mary, in Devon, England

The community within the town of Clarkes Beach had a population of 104 by 1956.

== See also ==
- List of communities in Newfoundland and Labrador
