= South River, Newfoundland and Labrador =

South River
- Town
- Interactive map of South River
- Coordinates: 47°31′56″N 53°16′05″W
- Country: Canada
- Province: Newfoundland and Labrador
- District: Harbour Main
- Established ca.: 1620
- Incorporated: 1966

Government
  - MHA: Helen Conway-Ottenheimer
  - MP: Ken McDonald
  - Mayor: Beverly Wells

Population (2021)
  - Total: 674
- Time zone: UTC-3:30 (Newfoundland Time)
  - Summer (DST): UTC-2:30 (Newfoundland Daylight)
- Postal Code: A0A 3W0
- Area code: 709
- Highways: Route 60; Route 70; Route 71
- Website: www.townofsouthriver.ca

South River is an incorporated municipality in the Canadian province of Newfoundland and Labrador, located at the south-southeast side of Bay de Grave, in Conception Bay. The town had a population of 674 according to the 2021 Canadian Census. South River is the site of the western terminus of Newfoundland and Labrador Route 60, also known as the Conception Bay Highway, which proceeds eastward to downtown St. John's. The river itself forms a natural boundary with neighbouring Clarke's Beach and is a scheduled salmon river. A second river, known as the Gould Brook, forms another natural boundary with the unincorporated local service district of Makinsons. South River is home to the Bay de Grave Regional Fire Department, a first step in developing successful regional cooperation amongst municipalities.

Modern-day South River comprises a number of very old, smaller settlements, namely, The Broads and Springfield. Salmon Cove Road (commonly referred to as just Salmon Cove, not to be confused with the nearby municipality of Salmon Cove) occupies the north side of a hill known as Long Harry, the south side of which is occupied by Cupids, the oldest English settlement in North America. There are three cemeteries in South River; a Roman Catholic cemetery on Hodgewater Line, and two Anglican on Salmon Cove. The earlier of the two Anglican cemeteries dates to the early-mid 19th century. In addition, there are marked graves scattered along Long Harry in areas known as The Cupids Road and Adam's Grove. These graves likely pre-date the cemeteries. There are several families in the area, particularly on Salmon Cove, which have lived there for centuries. These families names include Bussey, Wells, Batten, Noseworthy, Andrews, and more. A geological formation on the shore of Salmon Cove known as Stake Cove is reputed to be the location where a woman, Catherine Snow, murdered her husband John by hitting him with a stake maul, hence the name of the cove. Catherine was convicted of the crime and hanged at St. John's, the last known woman to have been hanged in Newfoundland.

Between South River and Cupids sits an area of provincially-protected pastureland. Used primarily by local cattle farmers, a portion of the pasture has been allocated for use by Newfoundland Ponies, Newfoundland's only designated heritage animal. The ponies are put to pasture from approximately early June to mid October. Visitors can reach the pasture from the Caplin Cove Road or Salmon Cove Road entrances.

The first mayor of South River was Mr. Harry L. Shepherd. The first female mayor was Ms. Veronica Rowe, who died while in office (2004). The council consists of seven elected residents of the town. The current mayor is Mrs. Beverly Wells.

== Demographics ==
In the 2021 Census of Population conducted by Statistics Canada, South River had a population of 674 living in 297 of its 351 total private dwellings, a change of 4.2% from its 2016 population of 647. With a land area of 5.97 km^{2} (2.31 sq mi), it had a population density of 112.9/km^{2} (292.4/sq mi) in 2021.

== See also ==
- List of cities and towns in Newfoundland and Labrador
