= E. R. Seary =

Canadian writer

Edgar Ronald Seary FSA FRHistS (1908, in Sheffield, England – 1984) was an educator and writer of two influential and important books regarding the history of Newfoundland and Labrador, Canada.

Seary, son of Henry and Edith (Brunt) Seary was educated at Sheffield University. He was fellow at Sheffield and in 1933 lectured at Mannheim, Germany and also trained interpreters for diplomatic and consular service. While a lecturer at Rhodes University, South Africa he published a bibliography of South African literature and during World War II he was captain in the South African Army. In 1951 he was appointed English Chair at the College of Arts and Science, Baghdad.

Seary arrived in Newfoundland in 1954 as head of Memorial University’s English Department, which he kept for 16 years. In 1967 he co-authored an ethno-linguistic study of the Avalon Peninsula with G. M. Story and W. J. Kirwin. In 1971 he published his book Place Names of the Avalon Peninsula of the Island of Newfoundland and in 1976 he published another popular and important book Family Names of the Island of Newfoundland.

Seary was awarded honorary degrees from both Sheffield and Memorial Universities and made Fellow of the Royal Historical Society and the Society of Antiquaries of London.

A promontory peak near the town of Bellevue was posthumous named in his honor.

== See also ==
- List of people of Newfoundland and Labrador
- List of communities in Newfoundland and Labrador
