= Tilton, Newfoundland and Labrador =

Community in Newfoundland and Labrador

Coordinates: 47°37′43″N 53°18′11″W

Tilton is a community located north west of Bay Roberts. The first postmaster was Thomas E. Greeley. The population was 377 in 1956. The community is now a part of the town of Spaniard's Bay. As of 2023, Tilton has a population of around 440 people.

== See also ==
- List of communities in Newfoundland and Labrador
