= Bay de Grave =

Natural bay in Newfoundland and Labrador, Canada

Coordinates: 47.583°N 53.214°W

Bay de Grave is a natural bay off the island of Newfoundland in the province of Newfoundland and Labrador, Canada.
