= Conception Bay =

Conception Bay may refer to:

- Conception Bay (Canada), a bay on the southeast coast of Newfoundland, Canada
- Conception Bay (Namibia), a bay on the coast of Namibia, Africa
