= Division No. 1, Subdivision L, Newfoundland and Labrador =

Subdivision 1L
- Unorganized territory
- Division No. 1, Subdivision L
- Location within Newfoundland
- Country: Canada
- Province: Newfoundland and Labrador
- Census division: Division 1

Government
  - MHA: Pam Parsons (LPNL, Harbour Grace-Port de Grave)
  - MP: Paul Connors (LIB, Avalon)

Area
  - Land: 8.21 km^{2} (3.17 sq mi)

Population (2016)
  - Total: 928
  - Density: 114.8/km^{2} (297/sq mi)
- Time zone: UTC-3:30 (Newfoundland Time)
  - Summer (DST): UTC-2:30 (Newfoundland Daylight)

Division No. 1, Subdivision L is an unorganized subdivision on the Avalon Peninsula in Newfoundland and Labrador, Canada. It is in Division 1 and contains the unincorporated communities of Bareneed, Black Duck Pond, Blow Me Down, Coley's Point South, Hibb's Cove, Pick Eyes, Port de Grave, Ship Cove and The Dock

== Bareneed ==
47°34′35″N 53°14′28″W Bareneed is a settlement in Division 1, Newfoundland and Labrador, Canada. It is located east of Bay Roberts, on the Port de Grave peninsula on the west side of Conception Bay.

Established by four families in the Brigus area of Newfoundland and Labrador in 1864, it became a village in 1968. (*There is an 1817 Census of "Bare Need" with names of Boon and Bartlet and others, and a population of 96).

The Way Office was established in 1874 and the first Waymaster was Jabez W. Butler. It became a Post Office on May 30, 1891.

In 1956 it had a population of 153.

In 1935 Bareneed had a population of 215 The 4 most prominent names are Richards, Bartlett, Batten, and Boone, and may be the original 4 Families to settle here. With a settlement date of 1864, the village elders (born in the 1850s and 1860s) would have settled the area with their parents.

== Black Duck Pond ==
47.572°N 53.250°W Black Duck Pond is a settlement in Newfoundland and Labrador.

== Blow Me Down ==
47.5936°N 53.1897°W Blow Me Down is a settlement in Newfoundland and Labrador.

Blow Me Down is small fishing settlement on the north side of Conception Bay, district of Brigus. It is situated on the point of land that separates Bay Roberts from Portdegrave Bay. Distant from Portdegrave by road 3 miles. Mail weekly. Population 60.

The village was named by Captain Cook, who circumvented and chartered NFLD, and wintered on the west coast.

== Hibb's Cove ==
47°36′00″N 53°11′00″W Hibb's Cove had a population of 87 in 1956.

== Port de Grave ==
See: Port de Grave, Newfoundland and Labrador

== The Dock ==
47°34′23″N 53°15′11″W The Dock is a settlement located southeast of Bay Roberts, Newfoundland and Labrador.
