= Makinsons =

Local Service District in Newfoundland and Labrador

Coordinates: 47.505°N 53.290°W

Location of Makinsons in Newfoundland and Labrador

Makinsons is a local service district and designated place in the Canadian province of Newfoundland and Labrador.

== Geography ==
Makinsons is in Newfoundland within Subdivision M of Division No. 1.

== Demographics ==
As a designated place in the 2016 Census of Population conducted by Statistics Canada, Makinsons recorded a population of 436 living in 180 of its 382 total private dwellings, a change of −0.5% from its 2011 population of 438. With a land area of 22.49 km^{2} (8.68 sq mi), it had a population density of 19.4/km^{2} (50.2/sq mi) in 2016.

== Government ==
Makinsons is a local service district (LSD) that is governed by a committee responsible for the provision of certain services to the community. The chair of the LSD committee is Margaret Taylor.

== See also ==
- Newfoundland and Labrador Route 75
- List of designated places in Newfoundland and Labrador
- List of local service districts in Newfoundland and Labrador
