= Cupids =

- Town
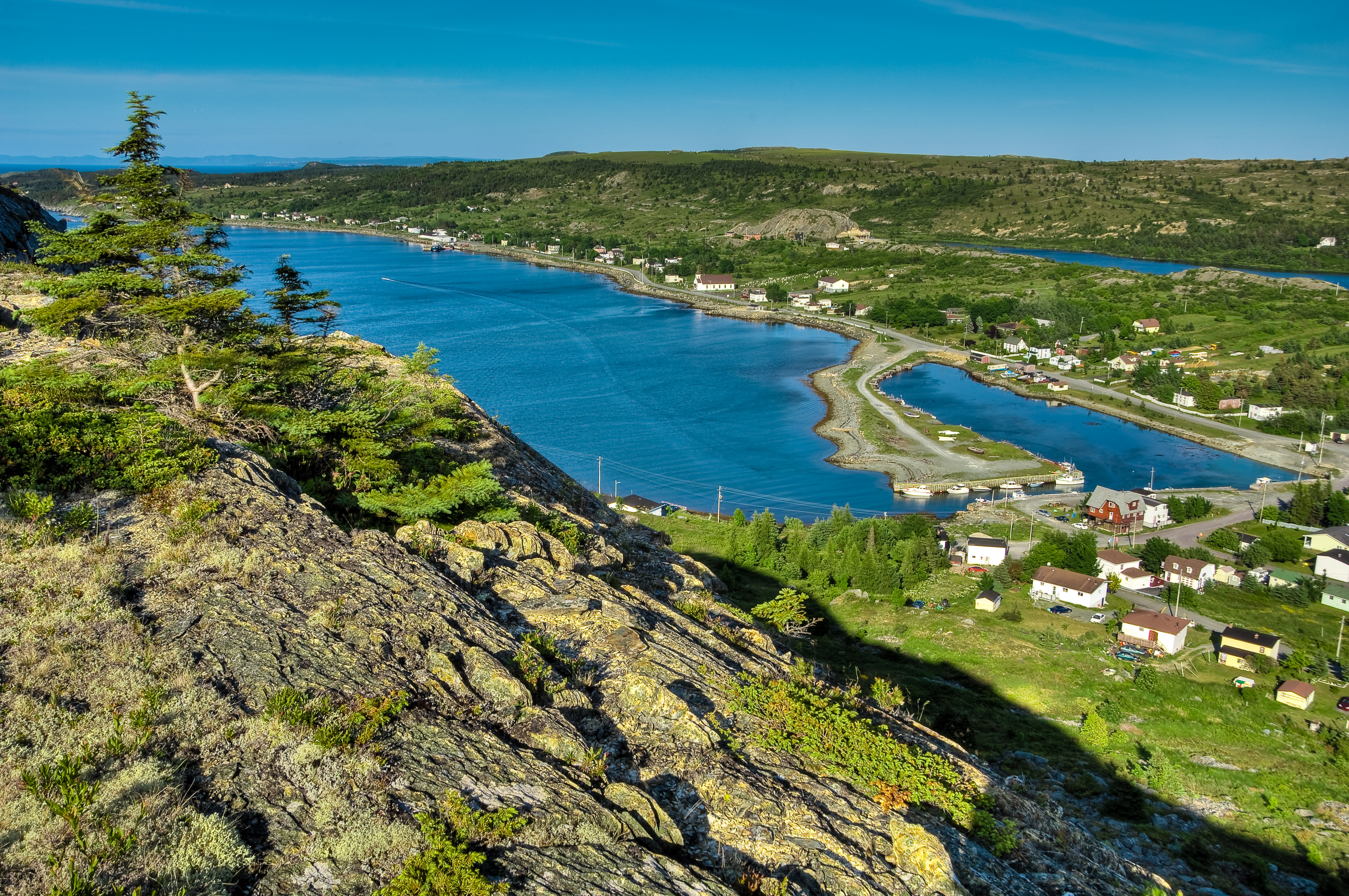

- Flag Seal

- Location of Cupids in Newfoundland
- Coordinates: 47.5478°N 53.2244°W
- Country: Canada
- Province: Newfoundland and Labrador
- Settled: 1610

Government
  - Mayor: Rod Delaney

Area
  - Land: 11.02 km^{2} (4.25 sq mi)

Population (2021)
  - Total: 699
- Time zone: UTC-3:30 (Newfoundland Time)
  - Summer (DST): UTC-2:30 (Newfoundland Daylight)
- Area code: 709
- Highways: Route 60; Route 70; Route 71

Cupids is a town of 699 people (per the 2021 Census) on Conception Bay, Newfoundland and Labrador, Canada. It has also been known as Coopers, Copers Cove, Cuper's Cove, and Cuperts. It is the oldest continuously settled official British colony in Canada. Cupids is believed to be the site of the first child born of English parents in the country. The town was established by Englishman John Guy in 1610.

In November 2009, the community was visited by The Prince of Wales and The Duchess of Cornwall. In August 2010, the community was visited by many people from around the world to celebrate the Cupids 400th anniversary, including Canadian Governor General Michaëlle Jean. On August 17, 2010, Canada Post released a commemorative stamp in honour of the founding of the community.

2010 also saw the opening of the Cupids Legacy Centre. This facility includes a world class museum, Faerie Garden, Cafe & Book Shop, Family History archive, Legacy Hall (a modern 2000 square foot open space), and a spacious boardroom. The Legacy Hall was later renovated in 2024, with an additional small showroom being added.

== Demographics ==
In the 2021 Census of Population conducted by Statistics Canada, Cupids had a population of 699 living in 325 of its 428 total private dwellings, a change of −5.9% from its 2016 population of 743. With a land area of 10.86 km^{2} (4.19 sq mi), it had a population density of 64.4/km^{2} (166.7/sq mi) in 2021.

== Arts and culture ==
Cupids is home to Perchance Theatre.

== See also ==
- List of communities in Newfoundland and Labrador
