= Bay Roberts =

- Town
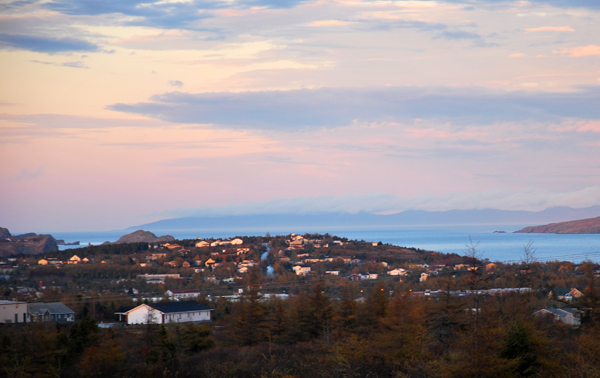

- Seal
- Motto: Proud of the past - Poised for the future
- Location of Bay Roberts in Newfoundland
- Coordinates: 47°35′05″N 53°16′42″W
- Country: Canada
- Province: Newfoundland and Labrador
- Settled (Naming): early 16th century

Government
  - Mayor: Geoff Seymour
  - Deputy Mayor: Neil Kearley
  - MHA: Pam Parsons

Area
  - Land: 24.05 km^{2} (9.29 sq mi)
  - Metro: 103.66 km^{2} (40.02 sq mi)

Population (2021 census)
  - Town: 5,974
  - Density: 249.9/km^{2} (647/sq mi)
  - Metro: 11,083
  - Metro density: 106.9/km^{2} (277/sq mi)
- Time zone: UTC−3.5 (NT)
  - Summer (DST): UTC−2.5 (NDT)
- Highways: Route 70; Route 72; Route 75
- Website: bayroberts.com
- Bay Robert used to be named Baie de Roberts, which is Bay Roberts in French.

Bay Roberts is a town located on the north shore of Conception Bay on the northeastern Avalon Peninsula in the province of Newfoundland and Labrador, Canada. As of 2016, the town's population is 6,012 and census agglomeration is 11,083. The growth of the local economy can be connected to the town's proximity to other major Newfoundland markets, by road and by water.

== Geography ==
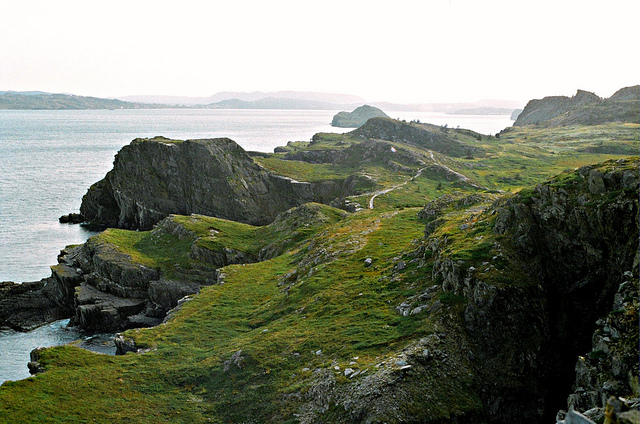
Rock Walls on the Bay Roberts Heritage Walking Trail

The town is connected by Veterans' Memorial Highway to Route 1 (the Trans-Canada Highway) leading to all points in the province. St. John's, the capital city, is 90 kilometres (56 mi) away. Argentia, the eastern terminal for Marine Atlantic's Gulf Ferry Service, is 70 kilometres (43 mi) away. Local businesses have easy access to more than half of the province's population. As a result, the town is a centre for major transportation and distribution, providing services for the Avalon Peninsula and surrounding areas. With approximately 6,000 people, it is one of the larger towns in Newfoundland, and the largest on the Baccalieu Trail. The town has a provincially recognized museum called the Road to Yesterday, and the Shoreline Heritage Walk has been developed. The Shoreline Heritage Walk is a 4-kilometre-long (2.5 mi) walking trail which passes through Juggler's Cove and French's Cove in Bay Roberts East and celebrates the early history of the town.

=== Bay Roberts Harbour ===
Bay Roberts offers year-round shipping services through its large port, which is similar in size to the harbour in St. John's and can accommodate the largest of ships. It is protected from ocean storms by Fergus Island at its entrance. The bay and harbour have clear shorelines, without rocks or headland protrusions. As a result of its size and outstanding features, it has been approved for anchorage by marine insurance companies.

== History ==
European fishermen visited Bay Roberts as early as the 16th century. Fishermen from Brittany and Normandy in what is today France fished the waters off the coast of Bay Roberts in the early 16th century and named the harbour Baie de Robert. They established onshore fishing rooms where they dried and salted codfish. The French fishermen came to the area because of its large harbour, and flat rock beaches which they used for curing fish.

Most likely they started building fishing rooms near the end of Bay Roberts harbour in Bay Roberts East in such areas as Juggler's Cove. Then they moved to French's Cove and later to Mercer's Cove. Evidence of these European people can be found in community place names such as Priaulx Hill and in nearby names such as Spaniard's Bay and Port de Grave.

By the late 16th century, Bay Roberts had become part of the English Shore. Some French, Spanish and Portuguese fishermen still visited the area but they were out numbered by fishermen from the English West Country. Over time, some of these West Country fishermen began to settle in the area. Seary's book Family Names of the Island of Newfoundland states that the families with the surname French arrived as long ago as 1634 and the Earles and the Badcocks arrived in the 1660s.

In the 1675 census, Bay Roberts is called "Bay of Roberts." The Berry census of Newfoundland records only two planters in Bay Roberts. One was Anthony Varder who lived there with his wife and four children. The other one was a widow named Jane Clay. The 1677 census says between them they employed 19 servants, owned six boats and kept 34 cattle, 22 sheep and 13 hogs. Families such as the Parsons, Mercers and Bishops arrived later.

These early settlers left behind archaeological evidence of their way of life. Clay pipes and other artifacts have been found in places such as Mercer's Cove. At least one ship was lost in Bay Roberts Harbour during the 17th century. A large number of ceramic vessels which came from a 17th-century shipwreck have been recovered from the harbour. Many of these are complete or almost complete. They include storage jars from the West Country of England and olive jars from Spain and Portugal.

=== French attacks ===
Like many settlements in Conception Bay, Bay Roberts was destroyed by the French during King William's War (1689–1697). When the French arrived in 1697, Abbé Baudoin, a priest who accompanied Pierre Le Moyne d'Iberville on his raids, maintained a journal. He called the town Baye Robert. He says that d'Iberville captured 10 servants, 3 planters and 3 boats there and took 1500 codfish. These numbers may not have represented the entire population. By the time Abbé Baudoin and Pierre d'Iberville arrived, many of the people who lived in Bay Roberts had probably escaped into the woods or to Carbonear Island because they had been warned that the French were coming.

=== Early town development ===
Settlers from the Channel Islands arrived in the 18th century.

Business development began with Robert Pack, founder of the firm of Pack, Gosse, and Fryer. The appointment of Robert Badcock as constable on September 25, 1730 began the rule of law for the Bay Roberts area. Stocks and a jailhouse were constructed for the punishment of criminal offenders. The construction of a one-room school also took place with one male teacher in charge.

In 1791, there were 30 members of the Wesleyan Church in Bay Roberts under the charge of George Vey. The Church of England was also active, since first St. Matthew's Church started in 1824 and was consecrated in 1827 to replace an earlier Church in Mercer's Cove. The first Society for the Propagation of the Gospel missionary in charge of the Bay Roberts mission was Rev. Oswald Howell in 1837.

The Newfoundland School Society (later known as the Newfoundland and British North American School Society and the Colonial and Continental Society) established a school in Bay Roberts in 1829 under Mr. and Mrs. Lind. The first president of the Newfoundland Teachers' Association, formed in 1890, was James Bancroft, who was teaching in Bay Roberts. He was instrumental in forming the Association. St. Mark's Anglican School in Shearstown dates back to 1867. (The original building has been incorporated into the present school, making it the oldest school in the district. The old building was destroyed by fire in 2002.)

By the 20th century, Bay Roberts was regarded as a wholesale and distribution centre for Conception Bay and Trinity Bay, and major businesses included cooperage (barrel making) and shipbuilding. William Dawe was the best-known cooper, having produced 7800 butter tubs in one year. J. Bowering was a renowned shipbuilder, who produced 50 ships a year for merchants and the Hudson's Bay Company for use in the fishing and sealing industries. However, the economy depended to a large extent on the fishing industry, as merchants owned between 60 and 70 ships which were used by the local fishermen.

In 1911, it had an Anglo-American Express office, postal telegraph office, ten stores, one hotel, three churches and one weekly newspaper.

The first combined passenger and mail flight in Newfoundland, made by Major F. S. Cotton on February 24, 1922 was between St. John's and Harbour Grace. Before reaching Harbour Grace, the plane touched down at Clarke's Beach and Bay Roberts in Bay Roberts East.

At the start of the 20th century, French's Cove in Bay Roberts East was a bustling fishing community. Today there is hardly leave any evidence that anyone ever lived there. However, the remains of root cellars and rock walls are in fairly good shape and have been reconstructed as part of the development of the Bay Roberts Heritage Trail.

=== Incorporation and after ===
The Town of Bay Roberts was incorporated in 1951 after Premier Joseph Smallwood suggested that if the town had its own council, it could take care of paving its own roads. In the time since its incorporation, Bay Roberts has seen many changes. The number of services has greatly increased from two main businesses to a town whose economy depends upon its service industry. Bay Roberts has become a main business centre for a large part of Trinity and Conception Bays. Vast improvements have also been made in the area of recreation with the modernization of the swimming pool and the development of the ball fields and tennis courts. It had a population of 2,226 in 1911 and 4,072 in 1976.

In 2011, Bay Roberts celebrated the 60th anniversary of its incorporation. On February 24, 1951, the town, which is an amalgamation of five smaller communities: Bay Roberts East, Bay Roberts, Coley's Point, Shearstown / Butlerville, and Country Road, officially became an incorporated municipality. The town of Bay Roberts has matured from its humble beginning as a fishing settlement to one of the most prosperous towns in the province. While the town flourished as a commercial centre during the early part of the 1900s, it was after incorporation in 1951, that it firmly established itself as a major service hub for the Avalon Peninsula. Robert J. Mercer was the town's first mayor in 1951 and Fred Winsor became deputy mayor. Others elected included: Eric Dawe of Avalon Coal Salt & Oil Ltd; Alton Churchill of Churchill's Building Supplies; John North, an early volunteer fireman with the town and later owner of a popular outdoor skating rink on Central Street; Victor Sparkes, Principal of St. Mark's School; Eric Marshall (Marshall's Hardware and later Marshall's Restaurant); Magistrate William E. Mercer, and Ray Cave, Cave's Barber Shop.

By the early 1960s, Bay Roberts had experienced a diversification in its economy with the establishment of dozens of successful, commercial establishments, thus allowing the town to free itself, somewhat, from dependency on the uncertain fishing industry. In 1965, after agreement though a circulated petition, the areas of Bay Roberts East, Coley's Point, Country Road, and Shearstown became part of the town; and finally, in 1990, the final parts of Butlerville and Birch Hills joined. The town is an early example in the province of a number of smaller communities joining together to work successfully for the good of all.

Eric Dawe of Avalon Coal Salt & Oil Ltd is only surviving member of the original town council and can be affectionately referred to by residents as the Only Living Father of the town's incorporation. He was Special Patron of the town's Winter Carnival in 2011.

== Historic sites ==
=== The Klondyke Causeway ===
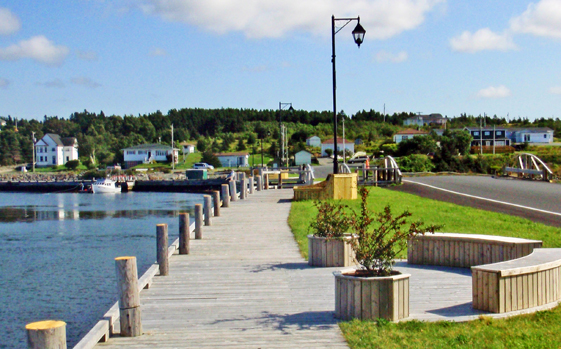
The Klondyke Causeway

The Klondyke, a causeway that connects Coley's Point and Bay Roberts, was once considered to be a "gold mine" to local families that were paid to complete it in 1897. Before the construction of the Klondyke, passengers and freight were ferried from Water Street in Bay Roberts to Coley's Point. During a public meeting in 1897, residents decided to build the causeway. Construction began in the winter months. Rock and gravel were carried to the site in hand-barrels, by horse and sled, and by hand. Men cut a channel through the ice and dumped the rock into the open water. When the Labrador fishery failed in 1897 and many families faced severe hardship, the government agreed to pay the men, women and children who worked on the construction of the causeway $1 a week to finish the work. Their wage was enough to buy one barrel of flour or one keg of molasses - a welcome relief for people facing a winter of hunger. One store owner in the area (reportedly Mrs. Bursell) compared the project to the Klondike Gold Rush and, as a result, the causeway got its name - The Klondyke (with a different spelling). Since 1996, Bay Roberts has celebrated the construction of the Klondyke and the unique bond between the two communities in the annual Klondyke Days festivities.

=== The Western Union Cable Station National Historic Site ===
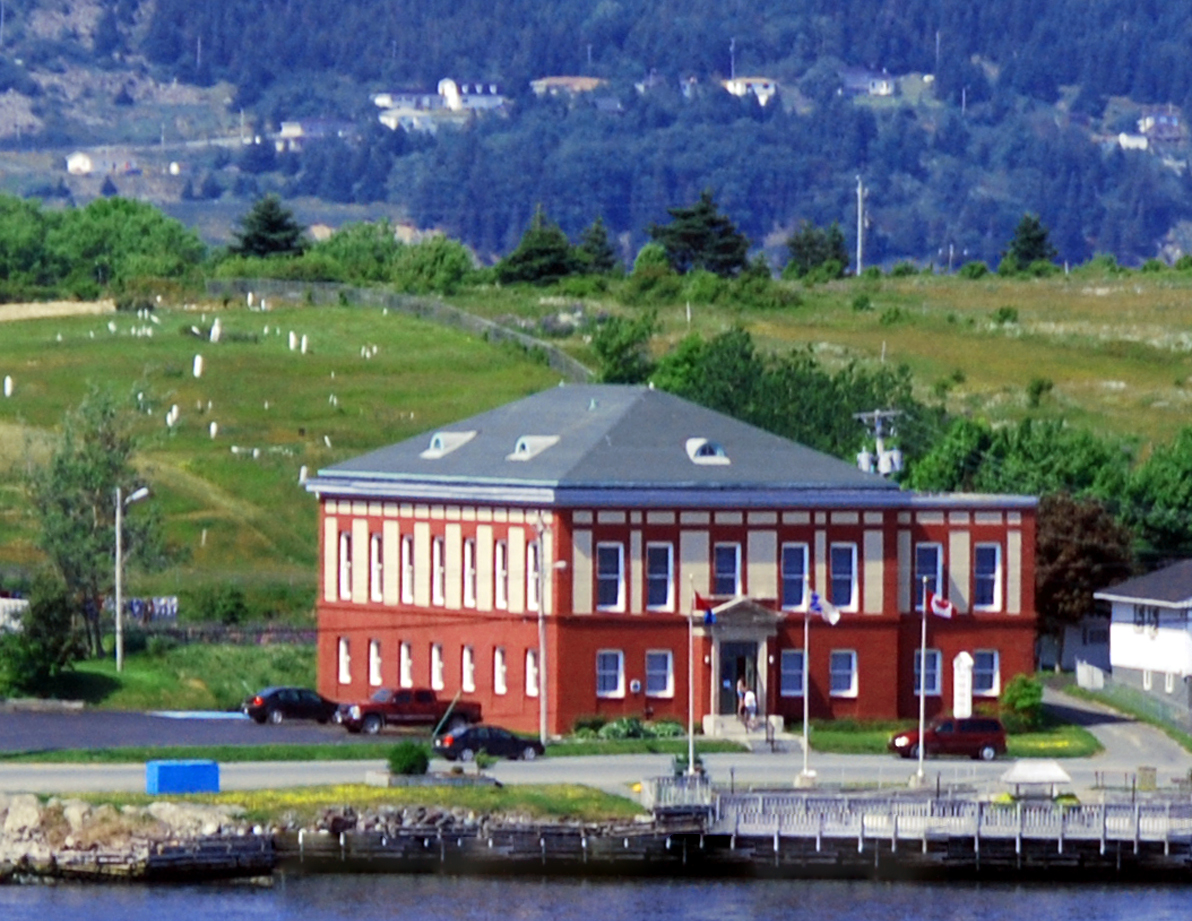
The Restored Western Union Cable Company Office in Bay Roberts

The Western Union Cable Company brought the outside world to Bay Roberts in 1910. Eventually, ten trans-Atlantic cables were landed there—among them the fastest in the world at that time. Hundreds of employees, both local and worldwide, passed through the doors of the Bay Roberts station. The brick building was erected as a relay station on the connection from England to North and South America. During two world wars, it necessitated a company of army personnel to guard the property from possible enemy action. Winston Churchill and Franklin D. Roosevelt had a private line on the link through Bay Roberts station.

The Cable Building in Bay Roberts was designated a National Historic Site in 2008, having already been recognized as a Provincial Registered Heritage Structure. Eric Jerrett of the Bay Roberts Heritage Society reflected the feelings of the town when he expressed his pride in the work the Heritage Society has done to preserve and restore the building. Today, the building is a centre of activity. It houses the "Road to Yesterday Museum," the Christopher Pratt Art Gallery, the Bay Roberts Archives, and the Bay Roberts municipal offices, and the Bay Roberts Council Chambers. In front of the building is a concourse which marks the site of the cable landing. The gallery is acclimatized and is designed to display a permanent collection of art work, including works by Pratt. In addition, it hosts the works of well known local artists and visiting art collections.

=== Bay Roberts Railway Station Registered Heritage Structure ===
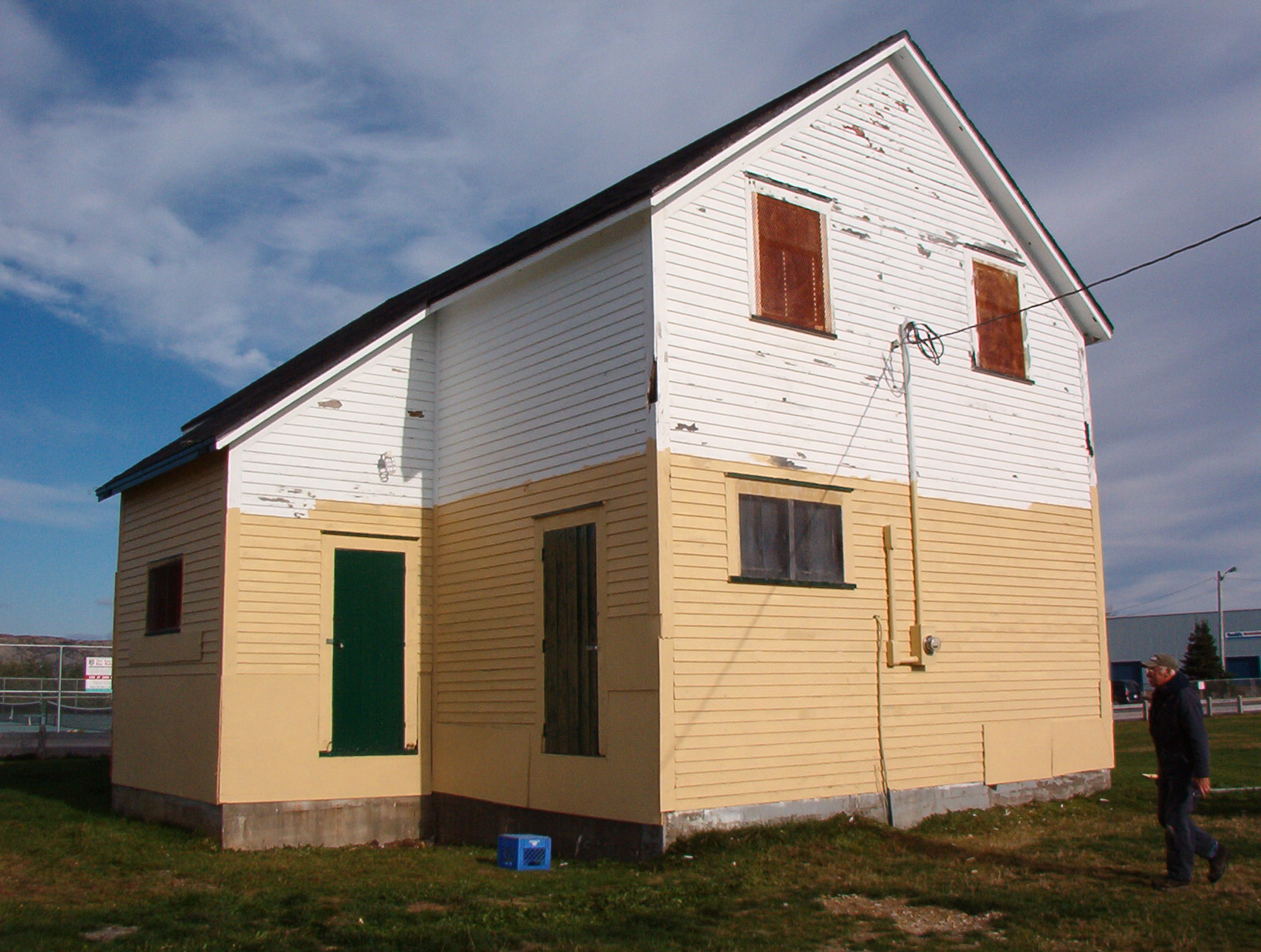
Bay Roberts Railway Station in 2006, prior to restoration

This two-storey wooden combination depot was built by the Reid Newfoundland Company sometime between 1899 and 1908, with living quarters on the second floor and facilities for passengers, baggage freight, and the agent’s office on the first floor. One of the earliest station masters was George Abbott, who worked at the depot from 1908 to 1921; six Abbott children were born to his wife Emily in the upstairs residence. The building was given heritage designation by the Heritage Foundation of Newfoundland and Labrador, on 27 April 2007, and designated as a Municipal Heritage Site by the Town of Bay Roberts on 12 June 2007.

== The Bay Roberts Guardian (weekly newspaper) 1909-1949 ==
The founder of the Guardian was the late Charles Edward Russell, who was born at Bay Roberts in 1877. In 1909, he bought a small printing plant from Harris and Wesley Mosdell who for a number of years published a weekly newspaper called The Bay Roberts Outlook. On 9 July 1909, the first issue of the Guardian rolled off the man-power-driven press. (Part of this printing equipment was acquired from the late (Magistrate) Jabez P. Thompson, who printed a newspaper called The Vindicator at Brigus, around the start of the 20th century.) Just after the founding of The Guardian in Bay Roberts, the Western Union Cable Company of New York became interested in acquiring a site in Conception Bay for their Atlantic Cable Relay Station. The Guardian was instrumental in persuading the promoters into selecting Bay Roberts as their site.

The Guardian also played a part in reporting the events of the two world wars, chiefly the events pertaining to the many local volunteers in the various services. Many headlines read: "Killed in Action", "Died of Wounds", "Missing in Action at Sea", and so on. Other reports included receptions on the occasion of homecomings, letters to loved ones at home, and the news of the Armistices.

Other events that made interesting headlines were: "The Loss of the Swallow" which was the story of the Coley's Point fishing vessel, The Swallow, owned and mastered by John Bowering and his crew, all from Coley's Point, who were driven to sea in the Atlantic during a hurricane in September, 1915. After many days adrift, they were rescued from their sinking vessel by a passing ocean liner and brought to England, and after being given up for lost, they arrived home on Christmas Eve that same year.

== Demographics ==
Historical populations
Year	Pop.	±%
1911	2,226	—
1976	4,072	+82.9%
1991	5,474	+34.4%
1996	5,472	−0.0%
2001	5,237	−4.3%
2006	5,414	+3.4%
2011	5,818	+7.5%
2016	6,012	+3.3%
2021	5,974	−0.6%
Population figures reflect any border changes or amalgamations that have occurred in the town's history.

In the 2021 Census of Population conducted by Statistics Canada, Bay Roberts had a population of 5,974 living in 2,490 of its 2,803 total private dwellings, a change of −0.6% from its 2016 population of 6,012. With a land area of 24.51 km^{2} (9.46 sq mi), it had a population density of 243.7/km^{2} (631.3/sq mi) in 2021.

Canada 2016 Census		Population	% of Total Population
Visible minority group Source:	South Asian	20	0.3
Visible minority group Source:	Chinese	35	0.6
Visible minority group Source:	Black	10	0.2
Visible minority group Source:	Filipino	0	0
Visible minority group Source:	Latin American	10	0.2
Visible minority group Source:	Southeast Asian	35	0.6
Visible minority group Source:	Other visible minority	0	0
Total visible minority population		110	1.8
Aboriginal group Source:	First Nations	85	1.4
Aboriginal group Source:	Métis	55	0.9
Aboriginal group Source:	Inuit	20	0.3
Total Aboriginal population		160	2.7
White		5,690	95.5
Total population		5,960	100

== Cultural activities ==
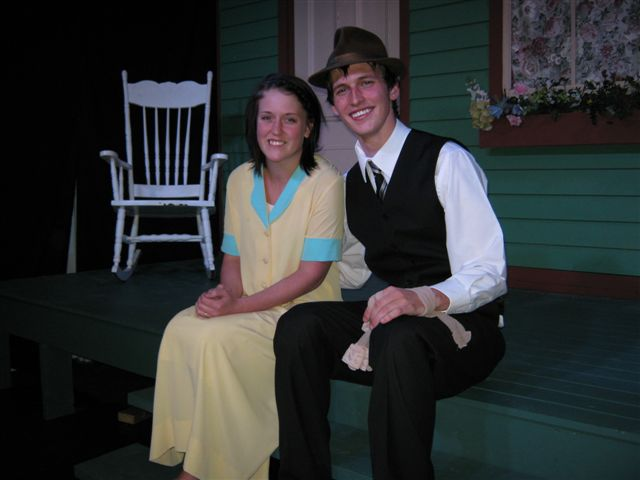
Culture Days-Salwater Moon 2010

The town has two summer theatre productions. "A Time in Pigeon Inlet" is in its 4th season. The production features musician and storyteller, Kelly Russell (recognized by the provincial government as Newfoundland and Labrador's first tradition bearer in 2009). A Time in Pigeon Inlet is based on stories written and performed on CBC radio by Kelly's father, Ted Russell. In 2011, Ted Russell was recognized as a "Person of Provincial Significance by the Provincial Historic Commemorations Program.

In July and August 2010, Victoria LOL #3 Museum and Playhouse featured a production of "Saltwater Moon" by award-winning Canadian playwright David French (who was born on Coley's Point.) Last summer, they produced his play "Soldier's Heart."

=== Major awards in 2009-2011 ===
Bay Roberts won the Newfoundland and Labrador 2011 Tidy Towns Award in the 4001 - 8000 population category. For Winter Lights Celebrations, the town won the National WinterLights Celebration Mentoring Award and Circle of Excellence 5 Star Award for Residential Lighting. During the summer, it won the 2009 Tidy Towns Award – Population category of over 3500 and the 2009 Torngat Municipal Achievement Award in the category of Environmental Sustainability with the Town of Spaniard's Bay – won for their joint efforts on the Shearstown Estuary. In the summer of 2010, Bay Roberts was one of 10 towns on the 2010 Kraft Celebration Tour. In 2011, Ron Delaney of Bay Roberts won the 2010 Cyril Hoskins Memorial Award for recreation practitioners from Recreation NL.

== Notable people ==
Award-winning Canadian playwright David French, author of Soldier's Heart, Salt-Water Moon, Leaving Home, and Of the Fields, Lately, was also born at Coley's Point. He has been writer in residence at the University of Western Ontario.

In 1914, nurse Myra Louise Taylor volunteered her services and was placed in charge of caring for the survivors of the SS Newfoundland sealing disaster.

Jacob Lewis, a singer from Butlerville, was the fifth season winner of Canada's Got Talent.

== Image gallery ==
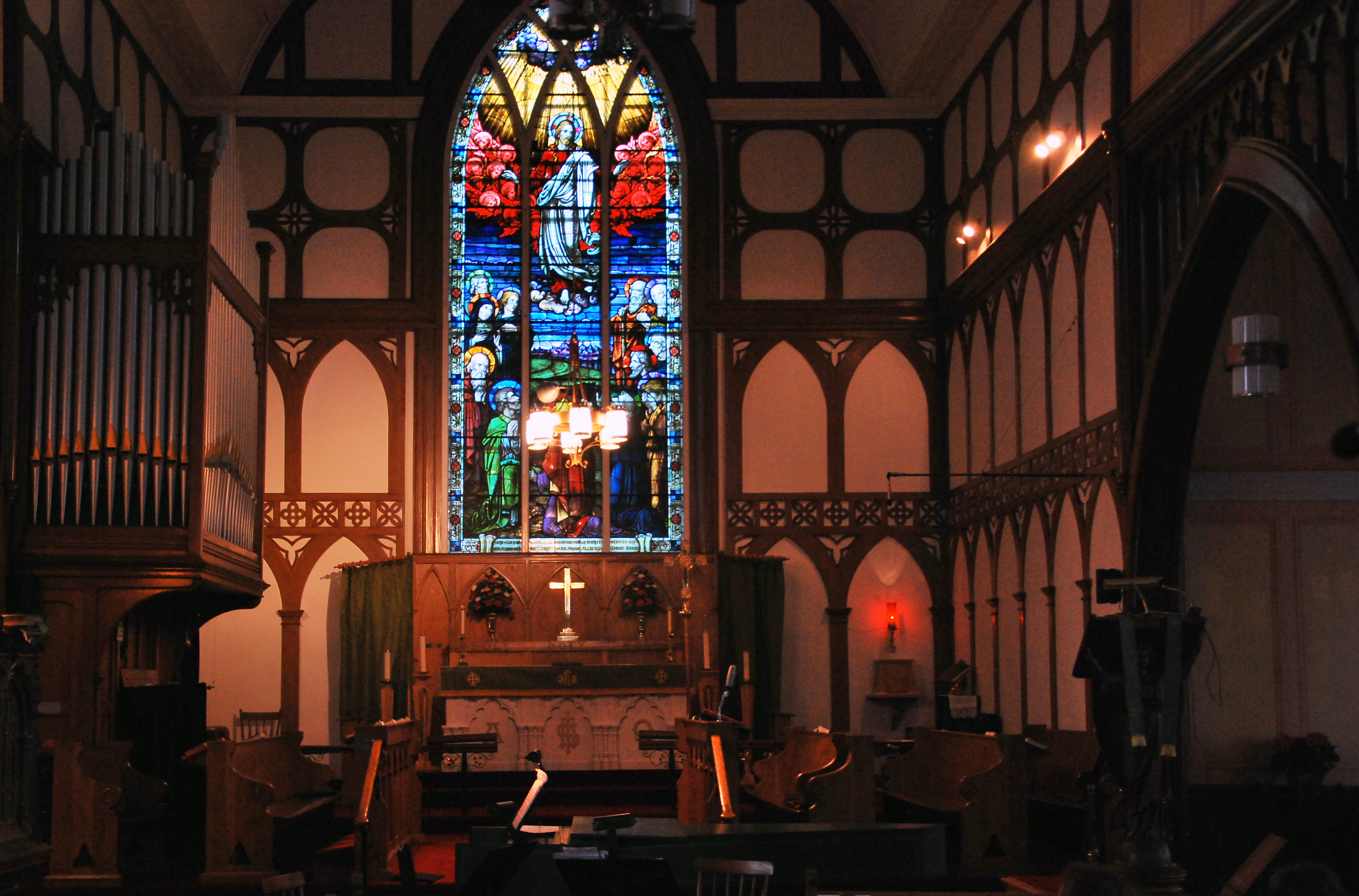
St. Matthew's Anglican Church - The Ascension

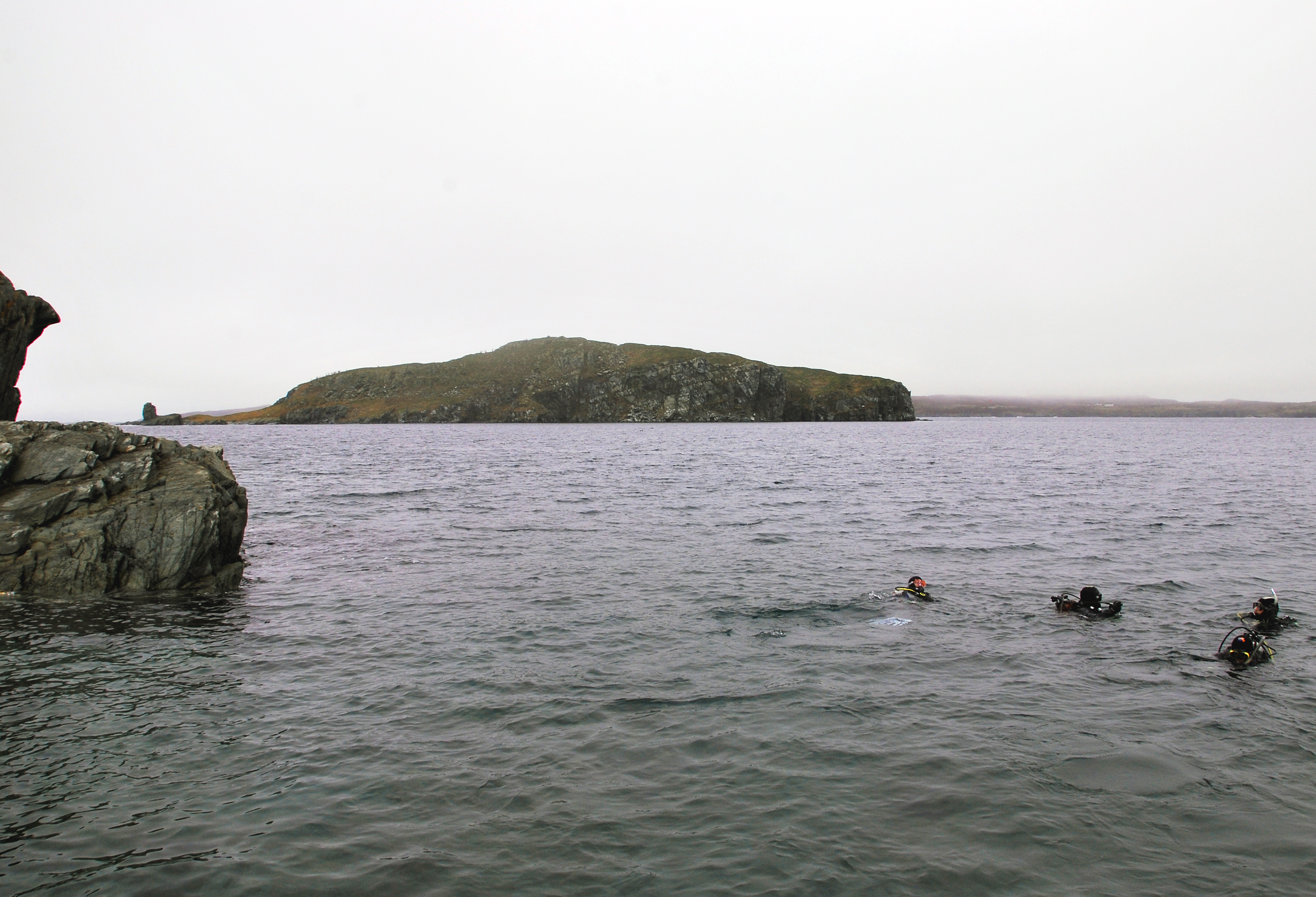
Diving Near Fergus Island

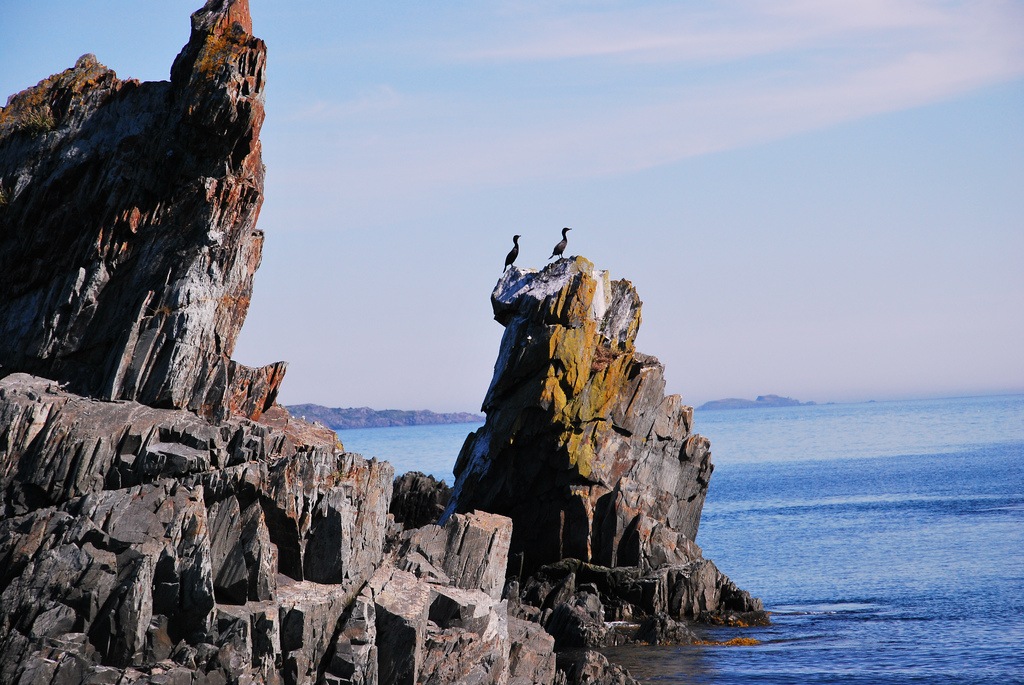
Cormorants on the Three Sisters

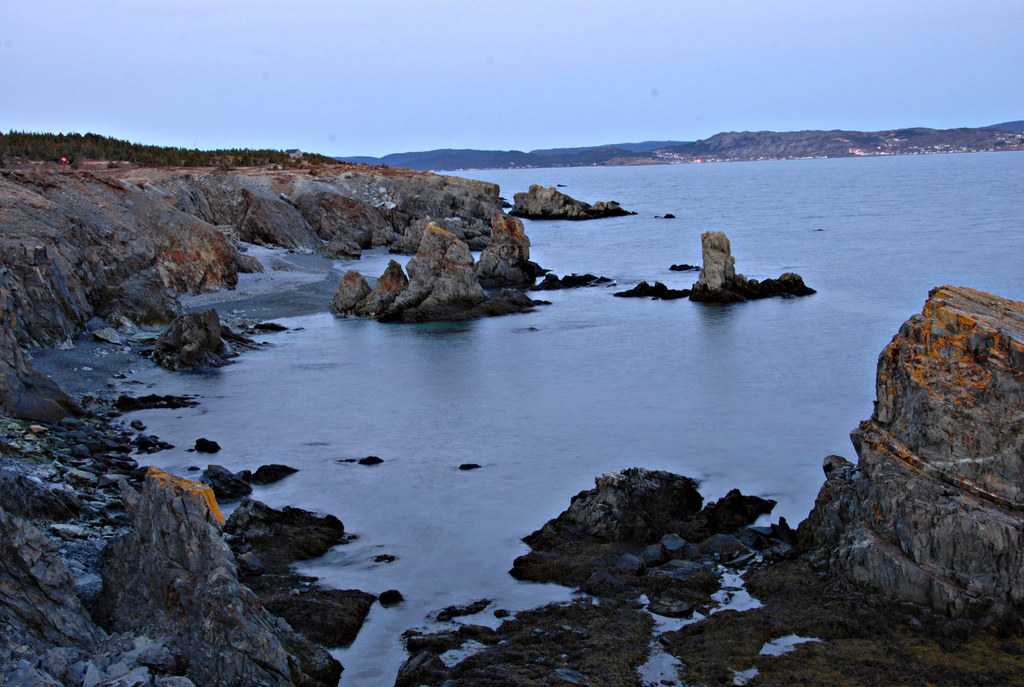
The Three Sisters

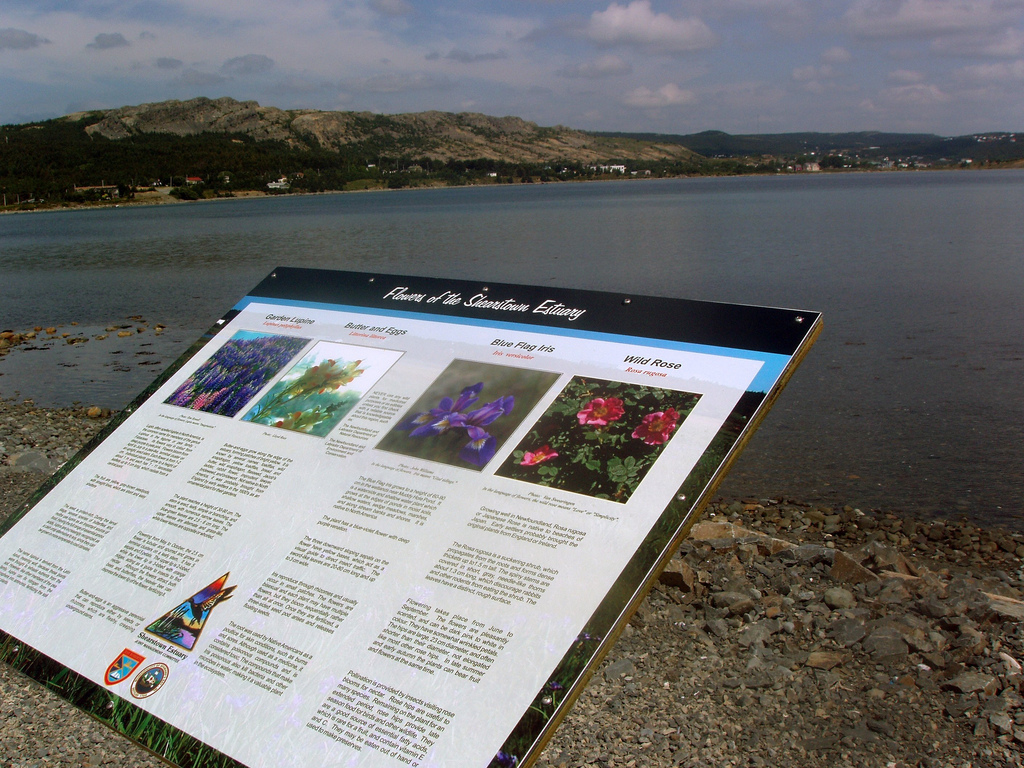
Award Winning Shearstown Estuary

== See also ==
- Carbonear
- List of cities and towns in Newfoundland and Labrador
