= Port de Grave =

Human settlement in Newfoundland and Labrador, Canada

Green Point Lighthouse
- Location: Green Point, Newfoundland and Labrador, Canada
- Coordinates: 47°36′41″N 53°10′36″W

Tower
- Constructed: 1883
- Construction: concrete (foundation), cast iron (tower)
- Height: 9 m (30 ft)
- Shape: cylinder
- Markings: Red and white (stripe), white (lantern)
- Power source: solar power
- Operator: Canadian Coast Guard
- Heritage: heritage lighthouse

Light
- Focal height: 17 m (56 ft)
- Range: 6 nmi (11 km; 6.9 mi)
- Characteristic: L Fl W 10s

Port de Grave is a peninsula on Conception Bay (CB) in Newfoundland and Labrador, Canada. The peninsula contains the communities of Bareneed, Black Duck Pond, Otterbury, Ship Cove, Blow Me Down, Hibb's Cove, Pick Eyes, and Hussey's Cove with a population of approximately 975 (2006). This community is located in the provincial electoral district of Port de Grave. An unincorporated area, for statistics purposes it is called Division No. 1, Subdivision L. The Peninsula is accessible by road via Route 72.

== History ==
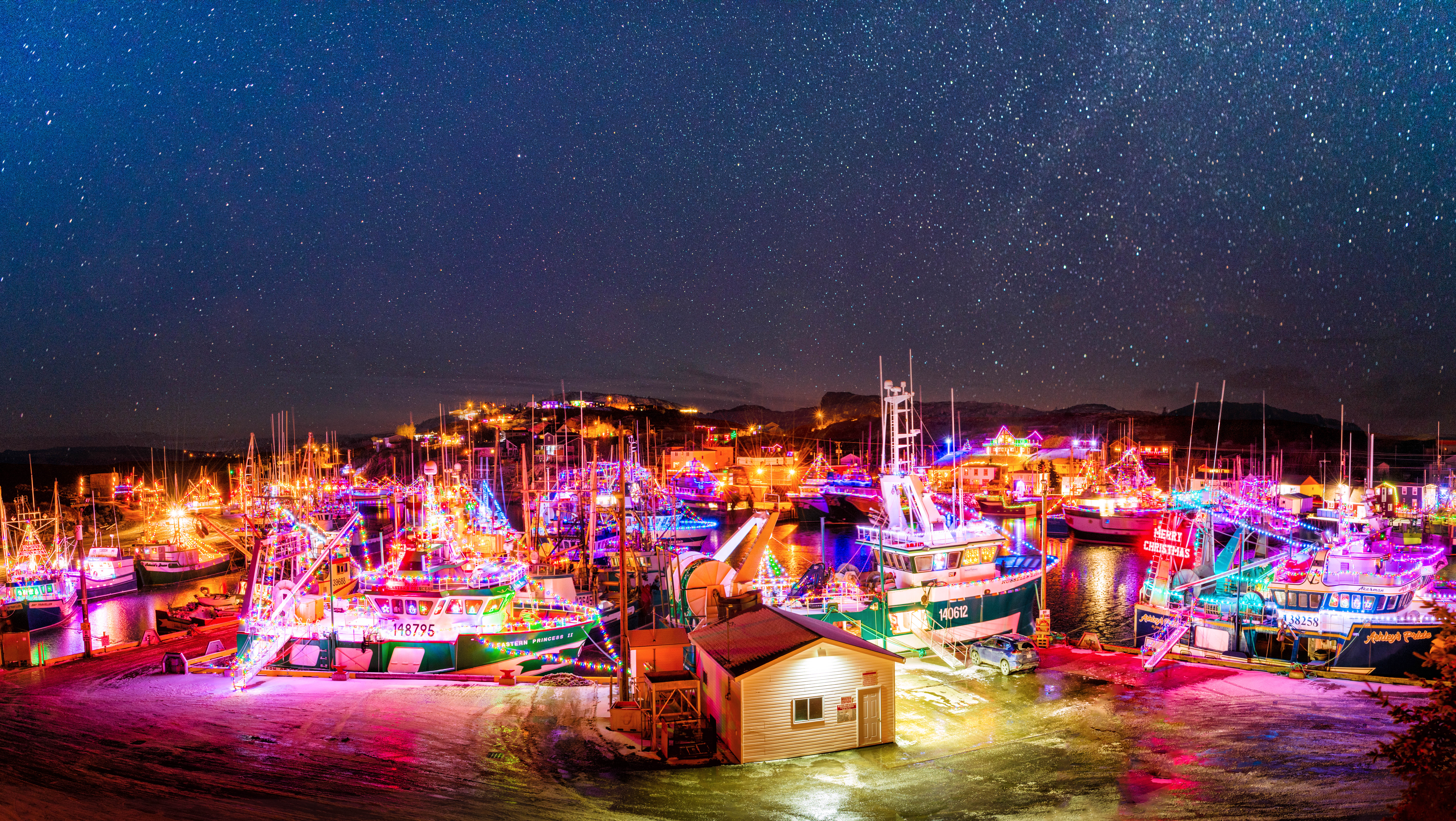
Christmas Boat Lighting at Port de Grave

The Port de Grave peninsula has been used by Europeans since the 16th century. Some of the first people to have used this land was the French, who used the beaches to dry their catch as they fished off the waters nearby. They named one of the many harbours they used to dry their fish "Graves". By the end of the 16th century the area from Carbonear to Brigus (with Port de Grave in the middle) had become a major area in the English fishery.

Official records indicate that a property in Ship Cove has been occupied since 1595 by the Dawe family which makes this the oldest registered land claim in Newfoundland. By the mid-17th century, Port de Grave had become a leading area in the evolving resident small boat fishery established by "planters" from West Country England. These people established a permanent population which made the peninsula the ancestral home of the Dawe, Butler, Tucker, Mugford, Snow, Porter, Andrews, Webber, Stevens and Anthony families.

During King William's War, the village was destroyed in the Avalon Peninsula Campaign. Port de Grave was destroyed by the French again during Queen Anne's War in 1705. During the 1705 raid hostages were taken to try to dislodge the defenders of Carbonear Island. From 1750 to 1850 Port de Grave was the commercial center for the area. Numerous Devonshire and Scottish mercantile houses and Jersey traders were present. Among those were the names of Newmans, Pinsents, MacPhersons, Prowses, Furneaux, Baine, and Johnston.

During the early 19th century a major seal hunting industry had developed, and the population of the community increased to its peak of 1400. After 1880, the population declined due to large steamships now being used for the sealing fishery. After World War II and Confederation, the local inshore fishery expanded rapidly and by the mid 1970s housed 3 fish plants and had major inshore multipurpose fishing fleets. It became known as one of the most prominent and progressive fishing communities in the province.

Port de Grave is still recognized as a very prominent fishing centre today in spite of the 1992 cod moratorium.

== Notable people ==
- Joseph L. Butler - established the Colonial Broadcasting System in 1936. (birthplace)
- Charles Dawe - MHA
- John Efford - former Canadian MP, Federal Minister of Natural Resources, and Port de Grave MHA (birthplace)
- Iris Petten - Canadian Senator (birthplace)
- Sir Robert John Pinsent (birthplace)
- Daniel W. Prowse - judge, publicist and author of the History of Newfoundland. (birthplace)

== See also ==
- List of lighthouses in Canada
- List of communities in Newfoundland and Labrador
