= George Webber =

George Webber may refer to:

- George Webber (athlete) (1895–?), British athlete
- George Webber (cinematographer) (1876–1967), Canadian-born American cinematographer
- George W. Webber (politician) (1825–1900), member of the U.S. House of Representatives from Michigan
- George W. Webber (minister) (1920–2010), American Protestant minister and social activist
- George Webber (poet) (1820–?), British poet
- George William Wallace Webber (1875–1967), New Zealand postmaster, boarding-house keeper and farmer

== See also ==
- George Weber (disambiguation)
- Georg Weber
