= List of shipwrecks in February 1879 =

The list of shipwrecks in February 1879 includes ships sunk, foundered, grounded, or otherwise lost during February 1879.

== 1 February ==
List of shipwrecks: 1 February 1879
Ship	State	Description
Ange	France	The lugger was driven ashore and wrecked at Porthcurno, Cornwall, United Kingdom. Her four crew were rescued. She was on a voyage from Bordeaux, Gironde to Swansea, Glamorgan, United Kingdom.
Anglo-Saxon	(United Kingdom of Great Britain and Ireland) Guernsey	The brig was wrecked on the Goose Rock, off The Needles, Isle of Wight.
Camel	United Kingdom	The steamship ran aground at Lowestoft, Suffolk. She was on a voyage from Workington, Cumberland to Lowestoft. She was refloated and taken in to Lowestoft.
Gezina Hillechina	Netherlands	The ship struck a sunken wreck, sprang a leak and sank. Her crew were rescued. She was on a voyage from Vegesack, Germany to Runcorn, Cheshire.
Hamburg	Germany	The steamship ran aground off the Schulau No. 2 Lightship (Germany).
Jeune Hortense	France	The ship struck a sunken wreck off the Longships, Cornwall and sprang a severe leak. She was on a voyage from "Port Mavalo" to Porthcawl, Glamorgan. She arrived at Portcawl the next day.
Margaret	United Kingdom	The ship ran aground on the Goodwin Sands, Kent. She was on a voyage from Boulogne, Pas-de-Calais, France to West Hartlepool, County Durham. She was refloated and towed in to Ramsgate, Kent.
Sofia	Italy	The brigantine was driven ashore and wrecked at Port Eynon, Glamorgan. Her crew were rescued.
Titania	United Kingdom	The brigantine was wrecked on the North Rock, off the coast of County Antrim. She was on a voyage from Ardrossan, Ayrshire to Demerara, British Guiana.

== 2 February ==
List of shipwrecks: 2 February 1879
Ship	State	Description
Laurel Wreath	United Kingdom	The smack was run into by the smack Pride of the Ocean (United Kingdom) in the North Sea 150 nautical miles (280 km) off Great Yarmouth, Norfolk and was severely damaged. She was towed in to Great Yarmouth on 4 February in a severely leaky condition and was placed under repair.
Naturalist	United Kingdom	The ship departed from Calcutta, India for San Francisco, California. No further trace, presumed foundered with the loss of all 30 crew.

== 3 February ==
List of shipwrecks: 3 February 1879
Ship	State	Description
Gertrude	Netherlands	The ship was driven ashore at Dungeness, Kent, United Kingdom. She was on a voyage from Rotterdam, South Holland to Southampton, Hampshire, United Kingdom. She was refloated and resumed her voyage.
Mary Elizabeth	United Kingdom	The ship was abandoned at sea. Some of her crew were rescued by the barque Rosa Chiclizola (Italy). Mary Elizabeth was on a voyage from Troon, Ayrshire to Demerara, British Guiana.
Patna	United Kingdom	The steamship ran aground on the Kigel Allen Shoal, in the Red Sea. She was on a voyage from London to Kurrachee, India. She was refloated the next day and resumed her voyage.
Undine	United Kingdom	The steamship ran aground at Portmahomack, Ross-shire. She was on a voyage from Portmahomack to Sunderland, County Durham. She was refloated and put in to Lossiemouth, Moray. She departed from Lossiemouth for Aberdeen, no further trace.
Van Diemen, and an unnamed vessel	United Kingdom; Flag unknown	The ship Van Diemen collided with a barque 333 nautical miles (617 km) west of Cape Clear Island, County Cork. Both vessels sank. There were four survivors from Van Diemen's 24 crew; they took to a boat and were rescued on 5 February by the steamship Agia Sofia (United Kingdom). The barque was lost with all hands. Van Diemen was on a voyage from Liverpool, Lancashire to New York, United States.
Vooruit	Netherlands	The ship was abandoned at sea. Her crew survived She was on a voyage from Clarecastle, County Clare to Liverpool, Lancashire, United Kingdom.

== 4 February ==
List of shipwrecks: 4 February 1879
Ship	State	Description
Benedicta	Netherlands	The ship was driven ashore. She was on a voyage from Makassar, Netherlands East Indies to New York, United States. She was refloated and taken in to Batavia, Netherlands East Indies in a leaky condition.
Claremont	United Kingdom	The brigantine was driven ashore at Moville, County Donegal. She was on a voyage from Saint John, New Brunswick, Canada to Glasgow, Renfrewshire. She was refloated with the assistance of a tug.
HMS Duke of Wellington	Royal Navy	The ship of the line was damaged by fire at Portsmouth, Hampshire. The fire was extinguished with the assistance of two tugs.
Lake Michigan	United Kingdom	The ship departed from Portland, Maine for London. No further trace, presumed foundered with the loss of all 23 crew.
Norma	United Kingdom	The steamship ran aground on the Walvischstoart, off the coast of Zeeland, Netherlands.
Retriever	United States	The barque collided with the steamship Balbec (United Kingdom) at Havre de Grâce, Seine-Inférieure, France and was severely damaged. Retriever was on a voyage from Havre de Grâce to Liverpool, Lancashire, United Kingdom.
Sarah Ann Dickinson	United Kingdom	The schooner ran aground on the Eagle Rock, off Ardrossan, Argyllshire. Her seven crew were taken off by the Ardrossan Lifeboat Fair Maid of Perth ( Royal National Lifeboat Institution). Sarah Ann Dickinson was on a voyage from Belfast, County Antrim to Ardrossan. She became a wreck the next day.

== 5 February ==
List of shipwrecks: 5 February 1879
Ship	State	Description
Asserine	Norway	The smack ran aground on the Blackwater Bank, in the Irish Sea and sprang a leak. She was on a voyage from Lisbon, Portugal to Ålesund. She put in to Waterford, United Kingdom.
City of Rotterdam	Netherlands	The steamship ran aground at Maassluis, South Holland. She was on a voyage from Barrow-in-Furness, Lancashire, United Kingdom to Rotterdam, South Holland. She was refloated with assistance.
Glamis Castle	United Kingdom	The steamship was beached at Bermuda. She was refloated on 12 February following repairs.
L'Assomption	France	The brigantine was wrecked at Saint-Malo, Ille-et-Vilaine. Her crew were rescued. She was on a voyage from Dunkirk, Nord to Granville, Manche.
Ribble	United Kingdom	The barque was sighted in the Hampton Roads whilst on a voyage from Baltimore, Maryland, United States to Saint-Malo. No further trace, presumed foundered with the loss of all fifteen crew.
Sarah Ann Dickinson	United Kingdom	The schooner struck the Eagle Rock, off Ardrossan, Ayrshire and was abandoned by her crew, who were rescued by the Ardrossan Lifeboat. She was on a voyage from Belfast, County Antrim to Ardrossan. She subsequently capsized and was wrecked.
Semper Paratus	United Kingdom	The fishing smack was destroyed by fire in the North Sea 60 nautical miles (110 km) off Lowestoft, Suffolk. Her crew were rescued by Louie (United Kingdom).

== 6 February ==
List of shipwrecks: 6 February 1879
Ship	State	Description
Margaret Shearer	United Kingdom	The smack was driven ashore at Arisaig, Inverness-shire. She was on a voyage from Port Dundas, Renfrewshire to Portree, Isle of Skye, Outer Hebrides.
St. Bernard	Netherlands	The barque ran aground at Dunkirk, Nord, France. She was on a voyage from Pisagua, Chile to Dunkirk. She was refloated and taken in to Dunkirk.

== 7 February ==
List of shipwrecks: 7 February 1879
Ship	State	Description
Kate	New South Wales	The barque was seized by the Chinese crew, who murdered her officers and scuttled her at Singapore, Straits Settlements. She was on a voyage from Sydney to Fuzhou, China.
Leopard	United Kingdom	The ship was driven ashore between Briton Ferry and Porthcawl, Glamorgan. She was on a voyage from Hayle, Cornwall to Porthcawl.
Marchioness of Londonderry	United Kingdom	The schooner sprang a leak and was beached between Bamburgh and North Sunderland, Northumberland. She was on a voyage from Kennetpans, Clackmannanshire to Trouville-sur-Mer, Seine-Inférieure, France. She had become a wreck by 13 February.

== 8 February ==
List of shipwrecks: 8 February 1879
Ship	State	Description
A. & W. C. de Jong	Netherlands	The ship was driven ashore at "Dwarsingweg", Zeeland. She was on a voyage from Java, Netherlands East Indies to Rotterdam, South Holland.
Arizava	United Kingdom	The brig capsized and sank in the River Mersey. Her five crew were rescued by a tug. She was on a voyage from Runcorn, Cheshire to Garston, Lancashire.
Bacalan	Spain	The ship ran aground and was wrecked at Havana, Cuba. She was on a voyage from the Guañape Islands, Peru to Havana.
Maggie	United Kingdom	The ship departed from Saint John's, Newfoundland Colony for Lisbon, Portugal. No further trace, reported overdue.
Myrtle	(Dominion of Newfoundland) Newfoundland Colony	The brigantine departed from Saint John's for Naples, Italy. No further trace, reported missing.
Orizava	United Kingdom	The ship capsized and sank off Garston, Lancashire. The wreck was subsequently dispersed by explosives.
Peace	United States	The steamship struck a submerged object and sank at Dunkirk, Nord, France. She was on a voyage from Philadelphia, Pennsylvania to Dunkirk. She was refloated on 25 February.
Prospero	United Kingdom	The steamship ran aground on the Haisborough Sands, in the North Sea off the coast of Norfolk. She was on a voyage from Sunderland, County Durham to Rouen, Seine-Inférieure, France. She was refloated and put in to Dover, Kent, where she struck the breakwater entering port.

== 9 February ==
List of shipwrecks: 9 February 1879
Ship	State	Description
Alpheus	Canada	The barque ran aground off Atherfield, Isle of Wight, United Kingdom and was wrecked with the loss of one of her fifteen crew. Survivors were rescued by the Atherfield Lifeboat. She was on a voyage from Nova Scotia to London, United Kingdom.
Aquila	United Kingdom	The ship was driven ashore. She was on a voyage from Goole, Yorkshire to London. She was refloated and taken in to Harwich, Essex in a severely leaky condition.
Cerangie, or Kerangie	New South Wales	The steamship was wrecked at Ram Head. Her crew were rescued. She was on a voyage from Sydney to Newcastle.
Echo, and Tay	Netherlands; United Kingdom	The steamships collided in the North Sea south of Flamborough Head, Yorkshire and were both severely damaged. Echo was on a voyage from Amsterdam, South Holland to South Shields, County Durham. She completed her voyage. Tay was on a voyage from Grangemouth, Stirlingshire to London. She put in to Grimsby, Lincolnshire with assistance from Echo.
Elise Wilhelmine	Denmark	The ship was driven ashore on Skagen. She was on a voyage from Liverpool, Lancashire, United Kingdom to Aarhus. She was refloated and assisted in to Fredrikshavn, Denmark.
Henry and Polly	United Kingdom	The ship ran aground on the Shipwash Sand, in the North Sea off the coast of Suffolk and sank. Her crew were rescued.
Levrette	France	The brigantine was abandoned in the Bristol Channel. She was driven ashore near Llanelly, Glamorgan, United Kingdom. She was refloated with the assistance of the Llanelly Lifeboat and the tug Ranger (United Kingdom and taken in to Llanelly.
Merivales	Spain	The steamship ran aground in the Balabac Strait. She was on a voyage from Singapore, Straits Settlements to Manila, Spanish East Indies. She was refloated and resumed her voyage.
Rajah	United Kingdom	The barque ran aground at Calais, France. She was on a voyage from San Francisco, California, United States to Calais. She was refloated and taken in to Calais.
Unnamed	Flag unknown	The steamship ran aground off Luccombe, Isle of Wight. She was refloated with the assistance of tugs.

== 10 February ==
List of shipwrecks: 10 February 1879
Ship	State	Description
Acklington	United Kingdom	The steamship was driven ashore at Dunnose Point, Isle of Wight. She was on a voyage from South Shields, County Durham to Portsmouth, Hampshire. She was refloated.
Algeria	Flag unknown	The full-rigged ship was driven ashore at Egmond aan Zee, North Holland, Netherlands. She was on a voyage from Savannah, Georgia, United States to Amsterdam, North Holland.
Bessie Grenfell	United Kingdom	The steamship was driven ashore at Safi, Morocco with the loss of all but four of her crew.
Jane	United Kingdom	The brig ran aground in the River Ouse. She was on a voyage from Belize City, British Honduras to Goole, Yorkshire.
Manitoba	United Kingdom	The barque was driven ashore near Dunkirk, Nord, France. She was on a voyage from Huanillos, Chile to Dunkirk.
Queen	United Kingdom	The ship was driven ashore and wrecked at Skegness, Lincolnshire. She was on a voyage from Rouen, Seine-Inférieure, France to Newcastle upon Tyne, Northumberland.
Strassburg	Germany	The steamship was run aground near Ystad, Sweden. She was on a voyage from Reval, Russia to Lübeck and/or London, United Kingdom.

== 11 February ==
List of shipwrecks: 11 February 1879
Ship	State	Description
Mary Stenhouse	United Kingdom	The ship was driven ashore at Rhosilli, Glamorgan. Ten of the twenty-two people on board were lost trying to reach land. She was refloated the next day and towed in to Swansea, Glamorgan.

== 12 February ==
List of shipwrecks: 12 February 1879
Ship	State	Description
Aigias Markella	Greece	The brig was wrecked at Dedeağaç, Ottoman Empire.
Caldera	United Kingdom	The barque ran aground on the Ridge Sand, off Deal, Kent. She was on a voyage from South Shields to Livorno, Italy. She was refloated and beached at Kingsdown, Kent in a waterlogged condition. Caldera was refloated with assistance from the tugs George Peabody and Lord Warden (both United Kingdom) and taken tow to Gravesend, Kent in a leaky condition.
Enoszis	United Kingdom	The schooner was wrecked at Dedeağaç.
Esther Ann	United Kingdom	The schooner was wrecked on the Wallace Rocks. She was on a voyage from Belfast, County Antrim to Barrow-in-Furness, Lancashire.
Faulconnier	France	The steamship sank after running into the schooner Beta off Nash Point, South Wales. Beta docked at Cardiff with the crew of Faulconnier.
Louise	United Kingdom	The steamship departed from Newport, Monmouthshire for Pasajes, Spain. No further trace, reported missing.

== 13 February ==
List of shipwrecks: 13 February 1879
Ship	State	Description
Albert	(United Kingdom of Great Britain and Ireland) Guernsey	The ship ran aground in the Nieuwe Waterweg. She was on a voyage from Grimsby, Lincolnshire to Rotterdam, South Holland, Netherlands.. She was refloated with the assistance of three tugs.
Alert	United Kingdom	The schooner was run down and sunk in the Belfast Lough by Mary Ellen (United Kingdom). Her crew were rescued by Mary Ellen. Alert was on a voyage from Ayr to Drogheda, County Louth.
Catherina	Germany	The ship was holed by ice and sank in the Elbe. She was on a voyage from the Rio Grande to Hamburg.
Falconnier	United Kingdom	The steamship collided with the schooner Beta (United Kingdom) and sank off Nash Point, Glamorgan. Her crew were rescued.
Freeman	United Kingdom	The fishing smack was run down and sunk in the North Sea off Cleeness, Lincolnshire by the fishing smack Forester (United Kingdom). Her crew survived.
Gustav	France	The brig ran aground on the Helwick Sands, in the Bristol Channel. She was on a voyage from Swansea, Glamorgan to Saint-Malo, Ille-et-Vilaine. She was refloated and towed back to Swansea in a severely leaky condition.
Ranger	United Kingdom	The tug sank a Portsmouth, Hampshire.
Reveil	France	The ship ran aground on the Bac du Ver. She was refloated and beached at Saint-Nazaire, Loire-Inférieure.
Shields	United Kingdom	The brig was run down and sunk off Nash Point, Glamorgan by the steamship Charles William Anderson (United Kingdom) with the loss of four of her crew.

== 14 February ==
List of shipwrecks: 14 February 1879
Ship	State	Description
Anders Knape	Sweden	The steamship ran aground on the Kentish Knock. She was on a voyage from the Firth of Forth to Gravelines, Nord, France. She was refloated with assistance from the smack Faith (United Kingdom) and taken in to Harwich, Essex, United Kingdom in a leaky condition.
Castalia	United Kingdom	The steamship was driven ashore at St. Margaret's Bay, Kent. She was on a voyage from New York, United States to London. She was refloated and resumed her voyage.
Gunga	United Kingdom	The steamship ran aground at Jeddah, Hejaz Vilayet. She was refloated the next day.
Laura Gertrude	United Kingdom	The schooner was wrecked on "Beriaban Island", off Borneo. Her crew survived.
Marion	United States	The brigantine was abandoned in the Atlantic Ocean. Her crew were rescued by the barque Syringa ( Canada. Marion was on a voyage from Charleston, South Carolina to Dublin, United Kingdom.
Olinda	Sweden	The brig was driven ashore and wrecked at Lillesand, Norway with the loss of all hands.
Shun Lee	China	The ship was driven ashore and severely damaged at Shanghai. She was refloated.
Taiwan	United Kingdom	The barque was wrecked in the Pescadores. Her crew were either rescued, or lost
Unnamed	Flag unknown	The barque was abandoned at sea. Her crew were rescued by an Italian barque.

== 15 February ==
List of shipwrecks: 15 February 1879
Ship	State	Description
Admiral Cator	United Kingdom	The steamship departed from Hull for Larnaca, Cyprus. No further trace, presumed foundered with the loss of all hands.
Frederick	United Kingdom	The ship was abandoned in the Atlantic Ocean with the loss of her captain. Ten survivors were rescued by the barque Gaetano (Italy). Frederick was on a voyage from New York to Fleetwood, Lancashire.
Johanna Meyer	Netherlands	The brig was driven ashore and wrecked in the Rio Grande. She was on a voyage from Liverpool, Lancashire to the Rio Grande.
Jura	United Kingdom	The steamship departed from Hull for Smyrna, Ottoman Empire. Presumed subsequently foundered in the North Sea off the coast of Norfolk with the loss of all sixteen crew. A boat and medicine chest from Jura were brought into Great Yarmouth, Norfolk on 21 February by the tug Pilot (United Kingdom).
Richard Wilson	United Kingdom	The ketch was wrecked on the Goodwin Sands, Kent. All seven people on board were rescued by the Ramsgate Lifeboat Bradford ( Royal National Lifeboat Institution). Richard Wilson was on a voyage from Goole, Yorkshire to Exmouth, Devon.
Sandhurst	United Kingdom	The ship was destroyed by fire in the Indian Ocean. All on board took to a boat; they were rescued on 6 March by a Royal Netherlands Navy gunboat. She was on a voyage from Calcutta, India to Dundee, Forfarshire. The wreck came ashore on "Pulo Telo", Netherlands East Indies in late April.

== 16 February ==
List of shipwrecks: 16 February 1879
Ship	State	Description
Adriatic	United Kingdom	The ship was driven ashore and wrecked 5 nautical miles (9.3 km) west of Dunkirk, Nord, France. She was on a voyage from Callao, Peru to Dunkirk. The wreck broke up on 25 February with the loss of 42 of the 49 people on board.
Fidget	United Kingdom	The ship ran aground on the Woolpack Sand, in the North Sea off the coast of Norfolk. She floated off and sank. Her five crew survived.
Mary	United Kingdom	The steamship was driven ashore and wrecked at Tynemouth, Northumberland. Her crew were rescued by the Tynemouth Lifeboat. She was on a voyage from Huelva, Spain to the River Tyne. The wreck was dispersed by explosives in May and July.
Sirius	Germany	The ship foundered in the North Sea off the coast of Aberdeenshire, United Kingdom.
Vesta	Norway	The ship ran aground on the Longsand. Her crew were rescued. She was on a voyage from Grimstad to Cardiff. She was later refloated and assisted in to Harwich, Essex, United Kingdom.

== 17 February ==
List of shipwrecks: 17 February 1879
Ship	State	Description
Broekker	Norway	The barque was driven ashore in Pegwell Bay. She was on a voyage from Amsterdam, North Holland, Netherlands to Savannah, Georgia, United States. She was refloated and taken in to Ramsgate, Kent, United Kingdom.
Ismyr	United Kingdom	The barque departed from Port Pirie, South Australia for a British port. No further trace, reported missing.
Louise et Jeanne	France	The ship was severely damaged at sea by a cyclone. She subsequently put in to a port in Portuguese East Africa, where she was condemned.
Pasithea	United Kingdom	The ship ran aground on the Longsand, in the North Sea off the coast of Essex. All 22 people on board were rescued by the Harwich Lifeboat and/or the smack Springwell (United Kingdom). She was on a voyage from Hamburg, Germany to Cardiff, Glamorgan. She was refloated on 19 February and towed in to Harwich, Essex.
Viola	United Kingdom	The barque was driven ashore west of Dunkirk. She was on a voyage from California, United States to Dunkirk.
Windsor	United Kingdom	The steamship ran aground at Dunkirk, Nord, France. She was refloated and taken in to Dunkirk.
Wycliffe	United Kingdom	The steamship was wrecked at the mouth of the Loire. Her 22 crew were rescued. She was on a voyage from Philadelphia, Pennsylvania, United States to Saint-Nazaire, Loire-Inférieure, France.

== 18 February ==
List of shipwrecks: 18 February 1879
Ship	State	Description
Apollo	Denmark	The schooner was driven ashore and wrecked at Hastings, Sussex, United Kingdom. Her five crew were rescued by the Hastings Lifeboat. She was on a voyage from London, United Kingdom to Cette, Hérault, France.
Esmerelda	United Kingdom	The fishing smack was driven ashore at Cayton, Yorkshire. She was refloated with assistance from the Scarborough Lifeboat Lady Leigh ( Royal National Lifeboat Institution), which towed her in to Scarborough.
Hanna	Norway	The schooner ran aground in a snowstorm and heavy seas 1 1/2 miles (2.4 km) north east of the Long Branch, New Jersey Life Saving Station No. 4, 4th District. Her seventeen crew were rescued by the United States Life Saving Service. She was refloated on 10 March.
Martha Miller	United Kingdom	The ship was run into by the steamship Great Western (United Kingdom) and sank off Black Head, County Antrim. Her crew were rescued by Great Western. Martha Miller was on a voyage from Runcorn, Cheshire to Newcastle upon Tyne, Northumberland.
Mary Cook	United Kingdom	The barque was wrecked on the Outer Skare, in the North Sea off the coast of Aberdeenshire with the loss of eleven of the fourteen people on board. She was on a voyage from Hamburg, Germany to Newcastle upon Tyne. Wreckage came ashore at Whinnyfold, Aberdeenshire.
Ninfa	Italy	The barque struck rocks at Pozzuoli and was wrecked. Her crew were rescued. She was on a voyage from the Levant to Genoa.
Robert Bright	United Kingdom	The barque was abandoned in the Bay of Biscay. Her nine crew were rescued by the steamship Haytian (United Kingdom). Robert Bright was on a voyage from Liverpool, Lancashire to Bahia, Brazil.
Surbiton	United Kingdom	The steamship departed from New York, United States for Rotterdam, South Holland, Netherlands. Presumed subsequently foundered with the loss of all 29 crew. Wreckage spotted in the Atlantic Ocean on 18 March was thought to be from Surbiton
Taupo	New Zealand	The steamship struck rocks and foundered near the mouth of Tauranga Harbour. The passengers and crew abandoned ship and made it safely to shore. The ship was eventually refloated in 1881, but she started taking water near Mayor Island while being towed and was abandoned.

== 19 February ==
List of shipwrecks: 19 February 1879
Ship	State	Description
Bertha	Denmark	The schooner collided with the barque Fylla (Denmark) and sank. Her crew were rescued. Bertha was on a voyage from Sunderland, County Durham, United Kingdom to Aarhus.
Clan Alpine	United Kingdom	The steamship was beached at Aberdeen after a rope got entangled in her propeller. She was on a voyage from Aberdeen to Campbeltown, Argyllshire.
Harvest Queen	United Kingdom	The schooner collided with the steamship Pleiades (United Kingdom) in Liverpool Bay off the North West Lightship ( Trinity House) and was severely damaged. Harvest Queen was on a voyage from Belfast, County Antrim to Runcorn, Cheshire. She was towed in to Liverpool, Lancashire by Pleiades.
Moses Day	United States	The brig ran aground in a snowstorm 2 3/4 miles (4.4 km) from Life Saving Station No. 5, 5nd District, 350 yards (320 m) off the Maryland coast, a total loss. Part of her cargo was salvaged. Her crew of ten and three passengers were rescued by the United States Life Saving Service.
Sadie	United States	The schooner ran aground in a snowstorm 3/4 miles from Life Saving Station No. 11, 4nd District, on the New Jersey coast. Her crew of ten were rescued by the United States Life Saving Service.

== 20 February ==
List of shipwrecks: 20 February 1879
Ship	State	Description
Annie Hooper	United States	The February gale:The fishing Schooner lost in a gale on the Georges Bank. All eleven crew were killed.
Annie Linwood	United States	The February gale:The fishing Schooner lost in a gale on the Georges Bank. All eleven crew were killed.
Bessie	Canada	The brigantine collided with the brigantine Mary Hounsell (United Kingdom) and sank in the Bristol Channel off Barry Island, Glamorgan, United Kingdom. Her crew were rescued. She was on a voyage from Cardiff, Glamorgan to Cádiz, Spain.
Clyde	New South Wales	The schooner was wrecked on Kaitorete Spit on the east coast of New Zealand's South Island when equipment failed during a strong northerly. All hands were saved.
Flying Scud	United Kingdom	The ship ran aground on the Goodwin Sands, Kent. She was on a voyage from London to Saint Helena. She was refloated and taken in to The Downs.
Garofolo	Greece	The brig struck a submerge object and was wrecked at Torre Annunziata, Kingdom of Italy. Her crew survived. She was on a voyage from Nicholaieff, Russia to Torre Annunziata.
George B. Loring	United States	The February gale: The fishing schooner probably lost in a gale on the Georges Bank. All ten crew were killed.
Gothenburg	United Kingdom	The schooner was driven ashore and wrecked at Peniche, Portugal. Her five crew were rescued. She was on a voyage from Tarragona, Spain to London.
Gwendolin	United States	The February gale:The fishing Schooner lost in a gale on the Georges Bank. All fourteen crew were killed.
Jacob Bacon	United States	The February gale: The fishing schooner sank in a gale on the Georges Bank or Grand Banks of Newfoundland. Lost with all twelve crew.
John Dove	United States	The February gale:The fishing schooner lost in a gale on the Georges Bank. All eleven crew were killed.
Joshua S. Sanborn	United States	The February gale: The fishing schooner sank in a gale on the Georges Bank. Lost with all eleven crew.
Lottie F. Babson	United States	The February gale: The fishing schooner sank in a gale on the Georges Bank. Lost with all eleven hands.
Mary Carlisle	United States	The February gale:The fishing Schooner lost in a gale on the Georges Bank. All eleven crew were killed.
Mary Lowe	United States	The February gale:The fishing Schooner lost in a gale on the Georges Bank. All eleven crew were killed.
Maude and Effie	United States	The February gale: The fishing schooner sank in a gale on the Georges Bank. Lost with all fourteen hands.
Morning Star	United States	The February gale: The fishing schooner sank in a gale on the Georges Bank. Lost with all ten crew.
Otis D. Dana	United States	The February gale: The fishing schooner sank in a terrible gale on the Georges Ban]. Lost with all ten or eleven crew.
Ralph Creyke	United Kingdom	The steamship foundered in the Bristol Channel 16 nautical miles (30 km) south west of Lundy Island the loss of six of her fourteen crew. Six crew were rescued by the steamship Charles Goddard (United Kingdom). Two crew were rescued by another vessel. Ralph Creyke was on a voyage from Cardiff, Glamorgan, to Dieppe, Seine-Inférieure, France.
Sea Queen	United States	The February gale: The fishing schooner was lost on Georges Bank in a gale. Lost with all ten crew.
Torpedo	United States	The February gale:The schooner ran aground in a snowstorm on Rye Ledge 1 1/2 miles (2.4 km) from Life Saving Station No. 7, 1st District, on the New Hampshire coast and was wrecked. Some equipment salvaged. Her crew of four were rescued by the United States Life Saving Service.
Four unnamed vessels	Switzerland	The fishing boats were driven ashore and wrecked at Vevey. There was one survivor from their crews.
Several unnamed vessels	Switzerland	The ships were wrecked at Neuchâtel.

== 21 February ==
List of shipwrecks: 21 February 1879
Ship	State	Description
Barbadian	United Kingdom	The ship ran aground on the North Rock, in the Belfast Lough. She was on a voyage from Greenock, Renfrewshire to Demerara, British Guiana. She was refloated the next day and was subsequently towed to Greenock.
Cassini	United States	The steamship caught fire at West Point, New York. She was on a voyage from New York City to Baltimore, Maryland. The fire was extinguished and she resumed her voyage, but ran aground in the Hudson River. She was refloated with the assistance of a cutter from the Revenue-Marine.
E. Shun	United Kingdom	The barquentine was abandoned in the Atlantic Ocean 240 nautical miles (440 km) off Cape Clear Island, County Cork. Her seven crew were rescued by the brig Cadet (Germany) and she was set afire. E. Shun wa on a voyage from New York, United States to Fleetwood, Lancashire.
Oberon	United Kingdom	The barque ran aground at ]Fleetwood. She was on a voyage from a port in Oregon, United States to Fleetwood. She was refloated the next day but grounded again. She heeled over as the tide receded and was severely damaged.

== 22 February ==
List of shipwrecks: 22 February 1879
Ship	State	Description
Adventurer	United Kingdom	The steam flat ran aground and sank on the West Hoyle Bank, in Liverpool Bay. Her crew were rescued by the Hoylake Lifeboat.
Arab	United Kingdom	The steamship was driven ashore in a hurricane while loading iron ore for Liverpool at Portmán, east of Cartagena, Spain. She was reported from Copenhagen, Denmark to have been refloated on 19 March.
Buccleugh	United Kingdom	The steamship was driven ashore at Almería, Spain.
Eliza Ann	Germany	The barque was driven ashore at Almería.
Emile	Italy	The brigantine was driven ashore at Almería.
Fanny	United Kingdom	The schooner was wrecked on the East Hoyle Bank, in Liverpool Bay. Her crew were rescued by the Hoylake Lifeboat. She was on a voyage from Abergele, Denbighshire to Liverpool, Lancashire.
Garafolo	Greece	The ship was driven ashore and wrecked at Naples, Italy. She was on a voyage from Nicholaieff, Russia to Naples.
James Vinicombe	United Kingdom	The barque was abandoned in the Java Sea. Her crew were rescued. She was on a voyage from "Pasaroeang", Netherlands East Indies to Falmouth, Cornwall.
Mary Ellen	United Kingdom	The brig ran aground off Moville, County Donegal. She was on a voyage from Maryport, Cumberland to Londonderry. She was refloated on 24 February and towed in to Londonderry.
Maya	Denmark	The brigantine was driven ashore at Alméria.
Model	Canada	The brigantine was abandoned in the Atlantic Ocean. Her seven crew were rescued by North (United Kingdom). Model was on a voyage from Harbour Grace, Newfoundland Colony to Naples, Italy.
Ortiga	Italy	The steamship was driven ashore at Naples. She was refloated on 10 March and towed in to Naples.
Zella	Spain	The ship collided with Ellen (United States) at New York and was beached. She was on a voyage from Matanzas, Cuba to New York.

== 23 February ==
List of shipwrecks: 23 February 1879
Ship	State	Description
Bedlormie	United Kingdom	The ship struck a sunken wreck in the Firth of Forth and was holed. She was on a voyage from Kennetpans, Clackmannanshire to Havre de Grâce, Seine-Inferieure, France. She put in to Leith, Lothian.
Charlotte	United Kingdom	The schooner foundered in the Irish Sea 20 nautical miles (37 km) south west of the Cardigan Lightship ( Trinity House). Her crew survived. Charlotte was on a voyage from Bangor, Caernarfonshire to London.
Foam	United Kingdom	The steamship struck rocks and sank off Smolen, Norway. Her crew were rescued. She was on a voyage from Cardiff, Glamorgan to Hommelvigen, Norway.
Kewardin	United Kingdom	The brig was run into by the steamship Aberfoyle (United Kingdom) and sank off Whitby, Yorkshire with the loss of a crew member. Survivors were rescued by Aberfoyle. Kewardin was on a voyage from South Shields, County Durham to Torquay, Devon
Lizzie and Jane	United Kingdom	The steamship was driven ashore and wrecked at Aberdaron, Caernarfonshire.
Mary	United Kingdom	The steamship was driven ashore North Shields, Northumberland. Her crew were rescued by a lifeboat. She was on a voyage from Huelva, Spain to North Shields.
Speranza	Norway	The brig ran aground in the Mixon Sand, in the Bristol Channel. She was on a voyage from Aberayron, Cardiganshire, United Kingdom to Swansea, Glamorgan. She was refloated and taken in to Swansea.

== 24 February ==
List of shipwrecks: 24 February 1879
Ship	State	Description
Aberfeldy	United Kingdom	The steamship was abandoned in the Atlantic Ocean. Her 21 crew were rescued by the schooner C. A. Meniac ( Canada). Aberfeldy was on a voyage from Philadelphia, Pennsylvania, United States to Ipswich, Suffolk.
Baron Hambro	United Kingdom	The steamship was driven from her moorings at Livorno, Italy and damaged several vessels.
C. M. Davies	United Kingdom	The ship was driven ashore and sunk by ice at Twielenfleth, Germany. She was on a voyage from Mejillones, Chile to Hamburg, Germany. She was refloated on 11 March.
County of Haddington	United Kingdom	The steamship was driven ashore at Rosneath, Argyllshire. She was on a voyage from the Clyde to Garelochhead, Argyllshire. She was refloated and resumed her voyage.
Despina	Greece	The brig was driven ashore and wrecked at the mouth of the Arno with the loss of all hands.
Dolphin	United Kingdom	The fishing lugger was driven ashore at Wexford. Her five crew were rescued by the Wexford Lifeboat Civil Service ( Royal National Lifeboat Institution).
Dreadnought	United Kingdom	The ship was driven ashore by ice at Twielenfleth. She was later refloated and taken in to Hamburg, Germany, where she arrived on 6 March.
Drepano	Italy	The steamship was driven ashore at Naples.
Filomena	Austria-Hungary	The full-rigged ship was driven ashore on Meloria, Italy and was abandoned by her crew.
Hafod	United Kingdom	The schooner sank in the English Channel 8 nautical miles (15 km) south south west of Dartmouth, Devon. Her crew survived. She was on a voyage from London to Plymouth, Devon.
Isabella	United Kingdom	The schooner was driven ashore at Coatham, Yorkshire. Her crew were rescued.
Mary Cook	United Kingdom	The barque was wrecked on the coast of Aberdeenshire. Eleven of the fourteen on board drowned.
Papa Costa	Italy	The brig was driven ashore at Port San Antonio, Texas, United States. She was on a voyage from Genoa to Puerto Rico. She was refloated.
Rival	United States	The fishing schooner was wrecked at Rye Beach, New Hampshire. crew saved.
Santa Anna Maria	Italy	The ship foundered in the Bay of Naples.
Stefano Padre	Italy	The barque was driven ashore and wrecked at Newton, Northumberland, United Kingdom with the loss of four of her crew. Survivors were rescued by rocket apparatus. She was being towed from Aberdeen to South Shields, County Durham, United Kingdom by the tug Scotland (United Kingdom).
Virginia	United Kingdom	The ship ran aground on the Pluckington Bank, in Liverpool Bay. She was on a voyage from Jamaica to Liverpool, Lancashire. She was refloated with the assistance of a tug and taken in to Liverpool.
York	United Kingdom	The steamship was driven from her moorings at Livorno and damaged several other vesseks.
Ysusquiza	United Kingdom	The barque was abandoned in the Atlantic Ocean. Her twelve crew took to two boats; seven crew in one of the boats were rescued the next day by the barque Armenia (Italy), The others were presumed to have perished. Ysusquiza was on a voyage from Baltimore, Maryland, United States to Newry, County Antrim.
Unnamed	Flag unknown	The collier was abandoned off Genoa, Italy.
Four unnamed vessels	Italy	The ships were wrecked at Follonica.
Two unnamed vessels	United Kingdom	The ships were wrecked at Follonica.
Many unnamed vessels	Italy	Seven martingraves were driven ashore at Naples, many more were severely damaged.

== 25 February ==
List of shipwrecks: 25 February 1879
Ship	State	Description
Alma	Germany	The barque collided with the steamship Durham (United Kingdom) and was severely damaged. Alma was on a voyage from New York, United States to Stettin. Durham towed her in to Arendal, Norway in a waterlogged condition.
Amazonas	United Kingdom	The steamship was driven ashore at Gibraltar. She was on a voyage from Alexandria, Egypt to Falmouth, Cornwall. She was refloated.
British Queen	United Kingdom	The steamship ran aground at West Hartlepool, County Durham. She was on a voyage from Hamburg, Germany to West Hartlepool. She was refloated.
British Queen	United Kingdom	The ship was driven ashore at Cochin, India. She was on a voyage from Cochin to London. She was refloated.
Eagle	United Kingdom	The steamship was driven ashore on Mew Island, in the Copeland Islands, County Antrim. She was on a voyage from Belfast, County Antrim to Swansea, Glamorgan. She was refloated and towed in to Belfast.
Frederico B	Italy	The ship was wrecked at Gioia Tauro with the loss of nine of her crew. She was on a voyage from Marseille, Bouches-du-Rhône, France to Alexandria, Egypt.
Liberta	United Kingdom	The ship ran aground at Burnham Overy Staithe, Norfolk. She was on a voyage from Burnham Overy Staithe to Sunderland. She was refloated and taken in to Burnham Overy Staithe.
Memphis	United Kingdom	The steamship was driven onto the Penas de Los Animas Rocks, off A Coruña, Spain with the loss of 23 of her crew. She was on a voyage from Liverpool, Lancashire to A Coruña, New York and New Orleans, Louisiana, United States. She was abandoned as a total loss. Memphis was refloated on 21 April and moved a distance of about twice her length.
Myrtle	United Kingdom	The brig ran aground on the Whiting Sand. She was refloated and taken in to Scotchman's Shed in a severely leaky condition.
Nance	United Kingdom	The smack ran aground on the Spike Bank, in the River Lee.She was refloated.
Promise	United Kingdom	The brigantine was driven ashore at Whitstable, Kent.

== 26 February ==
List of shipwrecks: 26 February 1879
Ship	State	Description
Cosmos	United Kingdom	The ship was destroyed by fire at La Spezia, Italy.
David H. Tolck	United States	The schooner ran aground off Long Beach, New Jersey in heavy surf and was wrecked. She grounded 200 yards (180 m) offshore. Her captain, his wife and three crew died. Six crew were rescued by the United States Life Saving Service.
Dunvegan Castle	United Kingdom	The steamship ran aground in the River Duddon. She was on a voyage from the River Duddon to Glasgow, Renfrewshire. She was refloated.
Edwin C. Dolliver	United States	The fishing Schooner was abandoned on Banks. Crew saved.
Eendraght	Flag unknown	The ship was driven ashore and wrecked at Guingamp, Côtes-du-Nord, France. Her crew were rescued. She was on a voyage from Maldon, Essex, United Kingdom to Saint-Brieuc, Côtes-du-Nord.
Elish Kendall	United Kingdom	The ship was lost off Margate, Kent.
Mystery	United Kingdom	The ship struck a sunken wreck and sank off Walton-on-the-Naze, Essex. Her three crew survived. She was on a voyage from Goole, Yorkshire to London.
Rosaire	France	The brig ran aground on the Seven Stones Reef, Cornwall and sank with the loss of three of her seven crew. Survivors were rescued by the pilot cutter Queen (United Kingdom). Rosaire was on a voyage from Cardiff, Glamorgan, United Kingdom to Nantes, Loire-Inférieure.
Ruth	Norway	The barque was driven ashore at Salerno, Italy.
Silistria	United Kingdom	The steamship was driven ashore and wrecked at Salerno with the loss of eighteen of her twenty crew.

== 27 February ==
List of shipwrecks: 27 February 1879
Ship	State	Description
Ann and Jessie	United Kingdom	The ship was destroyed by fire at Kilkeel, County Cork.
Marius	Norway	The barque was driven ashore and wrecked in Newark Bay, Orkney Islands, United Kingdom. Her crew were rescued. She was on a voyage from Mandal to Liverpool, Lancashire, United Kingdom. She was refloated and resumed her voyage.

== 28 February ==
List of shipwrecks: 28 February 1879
Ship	State	Description
Dundrennan	United Kingdom	The brigantine was run down and sunk off Lavernock, Glamorgan by the steamship Somorro (United Kingdom). Her crew were rescued.
Eschlea	Germany	The ship was driven ashore and wrecked on Callantsoog, Groningen, Netherlands. She was on a voyage from Louvain, Flemish Brabant, Belgium to a Scottish port.
Guillermo, and Istrian	Spain; United Kingdom	The steamship Guillermo collided with the steamship Istrian, caught fire and sank off 4 nautical miles (7.4 km) The Skerries, Anglesey. Her 38 crew were rescued by the steamships Lord Athlumny and Magnet (both United Kingdom). Guillermo was on a voyage from Baltimore, Maryland, United States to Liverpool, Lancashire, United Kingdom. Istrian was severely damaged at the bow. She subsequently collided with Liverpool, Lancashire to Boston, Massachusetts, United States. She the steamship Lord Ashlumney. She was on a voyage from Liverpool to Boston, Massachusetts, United States. She was towed in to Holyhead, Anglesey in a severely damaged condition.
Jane	United Kingdom	The schooner was driven ashore and wrecked at the Kilcredaun Head Lighthouse, County Clare. Her crew were rescued.
Louisa	United Kingdom	The schooner ran aground on The Shingles, off the Isle of Wight. She was on a voyage from Portmadoc, Caernarfonshire to Portsmouth, Hampshire. She was refloated and resumed her voyage.
Morgan Richards	United Kingdom	The ship was driven ashore at Margate, Kent. She was on a voyage from Rotterdam, South Holland, Netherlands to Cardiff, Glamorgan. She was refloated and resumed her voyage.
Sunderland	United Kingdom	The steamship ran aground at the mouth of the River Wear. She was on a voyage from London to Sunderland, County Durham. She was refloated and taken in to Sunderland.
Tarragona	United Kingdom	The brig was driven ashore at the Cabo de Santa Maria, Portugal. She was on a voyage from Newport, Monmouthshire to Seville, Spain. She was refloated and taken in to Faro, Portugal.

== Unknown date ==
List of shipwrecks: Unknown date in February 1879
Ship	State	Description
HMS Active, and HMS Tenedos	Royal Navy	The Eclipse-class sloop HMS Tenedos ran aground in Tugela Bay, Cape Colony. The Volage-class corvette HMS Active came to her assistance but also ran aground when a rope got entangled in her propeller. Both vessels were refloated 36 hours later.
Alice Platt	United Kingdom	The ship ran aground at Kangaroo Island, South Australia. She was on a voyage from Melbourne, Victoria to Port Pirie, South Australia. She was refloated and resumed her voyage.
Andrew Lovitt	Canada	The ship was abandoned in the Atlantic Ocean. Her crew were rescued by Guiseppina Oneta (Italy). Andrew Lovitt was on a voyage from Baltimore, Maryland, United States to Rouen, Seine-Inférieure, France.
Annie Maud	United Kingdom	The ship was driven ashore at Crookhaven, County Cork. She was refloated and found to be leaky.
Arturo	Italy	The ship was driven ashore at Boston, Massachusetts, United States. She was on a voyage from Boston to Gloucester, United Kingdom. She was refloated and put back to Boston for repairs.
Augusta, and Flying Hurricane	United Kingdom	The steamship Augusta and the tugboat Flying Hurricane were driven ashore and wrecked on Tory Island, County Donegal. Their crews were rescued. Flying Hurricane was towing Augusta from Sligo to Glasgow, Renfrewshire.
Aurora	Netherlands	The ship was wrecked before 5 February. Her crew were rescued. She was on a voyage from Pensacola, Florida to Harlingen, Friesland.
Bernando P.	Italy	The barque was abandoned in the Atlantic Ocean before 5 February. Her crew were rescued.
Bunin	Italy	The ship was driven ashore. She was on a voyage from Philadelphia, Pennsylvania, United States to Calais. She was refloated and taken in to Newcastle, United States.
Canada West	United Kingdom	The barque was abandoned in the Atlantic Ocean. Her crew were rescued. She was on a voyage from Saint John, New Brunswick, Canada to Barcelona, Spain.
Christiania	Norway	The ship ran aground at Batavia, Netherlands East Indies. She was on a voyage from Batavia to Bushire, Persia. She was refloated and resumed her voyage, but put in to Kurrachee, India in a leaky condition.
Delta	United Kingdom	The ship was run down and sunk in the Atlantic Ocean by the steamship Equateur (France) with some loss of life.
Carangie	New South Wales	The ship was wrecked at Ran Head. Her crew were rescued. She was on a voyage from Sydney to Newcastle.
Edissa	(United Kingdom of Great Britain and Ireland) Guernsey	The schooner ran aground on the Shipwash Sand, in the North Sea off the coast of Suffolk. She was on a voyage from London to South Shields, County Durham. She was refloated and taken in to Lowestoft, Suffolk in a leaky condition.
Fanny J. McLellan	United States	The ship was abandoned at sea. She was on a voyage from New Orleans, Louisiana to Rouen.
Fernando Po	United Kingdom	The ship was abandoned in the Atlantic Ocean. Her crew were rescued. She was on a voyage from Newcastle upon Tyne, Northumberland to Constantinople, Ottoman Empire.
Frida Lehment	Germany	The barque became trapped in ice off Marstrand, Sweden and was abandoned. She was on a voyage from Galveston, Texas, United States to Gothenburg, Sweden. She was taken in to Lillesand, Norway on 14 February.
Ganle	France	The barque was wrecked on a reef in the Dry Tortugas before 6 February. Her crew were rescued. She was on a voyage from Pensacola] to Marseille, Bouches-du-Rhône.
Grant	United States	The ship was damaged by fire at New Orleans. She was on a voyage from New Orleans to Genoa, Italy.
Hawthorne	United States	The barque was wrecked on the Southvals with the loss of three of her nineteen crew. Survivors were rescued by the schooner Grace Cushing (United States). Hawthorne was on a voyage from Singapore, Straits Settlements to Boston, Massachusetts.
Hercules	Chile	The steamship was wrecked in the Pacific Ocean before 3 February. Her crew were rescued.
Hero	United Kingdom	The ship foundered off the north coast of Cornwall in late February.
Home	Canada	The ship was abandoned in the Atlantic Ocean before 24 February. Her crew were rescued by Silver Cloud (United Kingdom). Home was on a voyage from Antwerp, Belgium to Philadelphia.
Hovding	Norway	The ship was damaged by ice and sank at Marcus Hook, Pennsylvania. She was on a voyage from Philadelphia to London.
Jane Rowland	United Kingdom	The ship was abandoned in the Atlantic Ocean 350 nautical miles (650 km) off Faial Island, Azores. Her ten crew were rescued by the steamship Sibylla (United Kingdom). Jane Rowland was on a voyage from New York to King's Lynn, Norfolk.
Jessie McCloud	United Kingdom	The schooner was taken in to Kilrush, County Clare in a capsized condition. She was on a voyage from Prince Edward Island, Canada to Queenstown, County Cork.
Kong Harald	Norway	The barque was abandoned in the Atlantic Ocean before 26 February. Her crew were rescued. She was on a voyage from Baltimore to Drogheda, County Louth, United Kingdom.
Leibnitz	Germany	The steamship ran aground in the Scheldt at "Calloo". She was refloated and resumed her voyage.
Leyte	(Spain) Spanish East Indies	The steamship collided with another vessel and was beached. She was a total loss.
Louisa	Spain	The steamship foundered in the Atlantic Ocean before 21 February. Her crew were rescued.
Mahomet	Canada	The schooner was abandoned in the Atlantic Ocean with the loss of two of her crew. Survivors were rescued by the brig Maria Anna (Denmark). Mahomet was on a voyage from Yarmouth, Nova Scotia to Antigua.
Mary Jane	United Kingdom	The ship foundered 300 nautical miles (560 km) off the English coast. Her crew had take to the boats but her captain feared they would perish, according to a message in a bottle that washed up at Craster, Caithness in mid-February. She was on a voyage from Glasgow to New Zealand
Manuel	Spain	The ship was abandoned at sea. She was on a voyage from "Ferrer Laguna" to New York.
Maria	Russia	The steamship was driven ashore on Skagen, Denmark.
Marie Heydorn	Germany	The barque was driven ashore and wrecked at "Karimon", Netherlands East Indies. Her crew survived. She was on a voyage from Java to Makassar.
Mary Edey	United Kingdom	The barque was driven ashore at the Coalhouse Fort, Tilbury, Essex. She was on a voyage from London to Mauritius. She was refloated and taken in to Gravesend, Kent.
Masonic	United Kingdom	The brigantine ran aground on the South Oaze, in the Thames Estuary.
Minniehaha	United States	The ship was wrecked on the coast of Florida.
Monitor	Norway	The brig was driven ashore at Green Island, Jamaica.
Olbers	Germany	The ship was abandoned in the Atlantic Ocean before 14 February. She was on a voyage from New York to Bremen.
Puella	United Kingdom	The brigantine ran aground at Barcelona, or Bilbao, Spain.
Racer	United Kingdom	The brigantine was driven ashore 9 nautical miles (17 km) east of Struys Point, Cape Colony. She was on a voyage from Mossel Bay to Guam.
Republic	United Kingdom	The ocean liner was run into by the schooner Ocean Queen (United Kingdom) in the River Mersey and was severely damaged.
Rosa Bottcher	Germany	The barque was driven ashore at Yantai between 22 and 24 January. Her crew were rescued. She was consequently condemned.
Sadie	United States	The ship was driven ashore in the Squan Inlet. She was on a voyage from Antwerp to New York.
Satama	(Russian Empire) Grand Duchy of Finland	The ship was driven ashore at Philadelphia. She was on a voyage from Philadelphia to Venice Italy. She was refloated and resumed her voyage.
Snapper	United Kingdom	The fishing smack was driven ashore at "Sandlesmere" or "Sandemere". Her crew were rescued by rocket apparatus.
Suede and Norwege	Flag unknown	The ship was driven ashore near Gibraltar. She was refloated.
St. Bede	United Kingdom	The barque was wrecked on the coast of Tobasco near Santa Anna.
Storkora	Germany	The ship was abandoned in the Atlantic Ocean before 14 February. She was on a voyage from New York to Bremen.
Taiwan	United Kingdom	The steamship was wrecked in the Pescadores. Her crew were rescued.
Teminia	United States	The schooner was wrecked on the coast of Tobasco near "Santa Anna".
Vandalia	United States	The schooner was driven ashore and wrecked at Gallipoli, Ottoman Empire. She was on a voyage from Gallipoli to Taranto, Italy.
Viking	Flag unknown	The barque was abandoned in the Atlantic Ocean. She was on a voyage from Norfolk, Virginia, United States to Lowestoft.
Zingra	United Kingdom	The barque ran aground on the Saratoga Spit. She was on a voyage from Antwerp to Yokohama, Japan. She was refloated with the assistance of a steamship.
Unnamed	United Kingdom	The ketch ran aground on the South Oaze.
Thirteen unnamed vessels	United States	The fishing vessels, all from Gloucester, Massachusetts, were lost in the Grand Banks of Newfoundland with the loss of 143 lives.
