= List of shipwrecks in February 1880 =

The list of shipwrecks in February 1880 includes ships sunk, foundered, grounded, or otherwise lost during February 1880.

== 1 February ==
List of shipwrecks: 1 February 1880
Ship	State	Description
Clansman	Canada	The ship departed from Swansea, Glamorgan, United Kingdom for Valparaíso, Chile. No further trace, reported missing.
Fiord	Denmark	The schooner ran aground. She was on a voyage from Ystad, Sweden to Newcastle upon Tyne, Northumberland, United Kingdom. She was refloated and taken in to Copenhagen.
Ivanhoe	United States	The ship ran aground on the Varne Ridge, in the English Channel. She was on a voyage from New York to Antwerp, Belgium. She was refloated with assistance from the smack Ripple (United Kingdom).
James	United Kingdom	The ship was driven ashore and wrecked at Whitehaven, Cumberland. Her crew were rescued.
King Ermyn	United Kingdom	The steamship ran aground off Cap la Heve, Seine-Inférieure, France. She was refloated.
Lewisman	United Kingdom	The schooner was driven ashore at Cairnbulg, Aberdeenshire. She was refloated.
Ransome	United Kingdom	The steamship was driven ashore at Blakeney, Norfolk. She was on a voyage from Newcastle upon Tyne to Ipswich, Suffolk. She was refloated on 10 February.
Saga	United Kingdom	The steamship ran aground at Llanelly, Glamorgan. She was on a voyage from Middlesbrough, Yorkshire to Llanelly. She was refloated.
Unnamed	United Kingdom	The mud hopper ran aground in the River Mersey. She was refloated.

== 2 February ==
List of shipwrecks: 2 February 1880
Ship	State	Description
Eleventh Lancashire	United Kingdom	The brig was abandoned off St. Govan's Head, Pembrokeshire. Her seven crew survived. She came ashore at St. Govan's Head.
Hamlet	United Kingdom	The ship departed from New York, United States for Galle, Ceylon. No further trace, reported overdue.
Nova Scotian	United Kingdom	The full-rigged ship ran aground on the Varne Ridge, in the English Channel. She was refloated.
Pilot, and Robert Stevenson	United Kingdom	The steam trawler Robert Stevenson ran into the tug Pilot at Newcastle upon Tyne, Northumberland. Both vessels were severely damaged.
Samuel Warren	United States	The schooner ran aground near Life Saving Station No. 23, 4th District, on the coast of New Jersey in a snowstorm, later sinking. Her four crewmen were rescued by the United States Life Saving Service.
Zaimis	United Kingdom	The steamship was run into by Neptune (United Kingdom) at Rouen, Seine-Inférieure, France and sank.
Unnamed	Flag unknown	The barque was driven ashore and wrecked on Islay.

== 3 February ==
List of shipwrecks: 3 February 1880
Ship	State	Description
Abbie Bursley	United States	Storm of 3 February 1880: The schooner was driven ashore 1 nautical mile (1.9 km) east of Life Saving Station No. 2, 2nd District, on the coast of Massachusetts and was lost. Her eight crew were rescued by fishing dories.
Augustina	Spain	Storm of 3 February 1880: The brig was beached in front of Life Saving Station No. 4, 4th District, and a 1/4 nautical mile (460 m) north of where E. C. Babcock (United States) had wrecked and broke up, on the coast of New Jersey. She broke in two and broke up, a total loss. Her seven crew were rescued by the United States Life Saving Service.
Castalia	United States	Storm of 3 February 1880: The brig was driven ashore 3/4 nautical mile (1.4 km) from Life Saving Station No. 3, 4th District, on the coast of New Jersey. All eleven people on board were rescued by the United States Life Saving Service. She was later refloated.
Corlie	United Kingdom	The ship was sighted in the Bali Strait whilst on a voyage from Samarang, Netherlands East Indies to a British port. No further trace, presumed foundered with the loss of all 30 crew.
Don Pedro	Canada	Storm of 3 February 1880: The schooner ran aground on Robinson's Beach, South West Harbor 5 1/2 nautical miles (10.2 km) from the Little Cranberry Island Life Saving Station No. 4, 1st District, on the coast of Maine, United States. She was refloated on 10 February.
E. C. Babcock	United States	Storm of 3 February 1880: The schooner was driven ashore 1/4 nautical mile (0.46 km) north of Life Saving Station No. 4 and broke up, a total loss. All eight people on board were rescued by the United States Life Saving Service.
Echo, and Said	Netherlands; United Kingdom	The steamship Echo collided with the steamship Said and sank in the North Sea off Southwold, Suffolk. Her crew were rescued by Said. Echo was on a voyage from London to South Shields, County Durham, United Kingdom. Said was on a voyage from Newcastle upon Tyne to London. She put in to Great Yarmouth, Norfolk in a severely damaged condition .
George Taulane	United States	Storm of 3 February 1880: The schooner suffered a fire at sea that was put out. She then anchored, but she then dragged anchor before dropping her anchor and went aground 200 yards (180 m) offshore in a gale and heavy seas 2 nautical miles (3.7 km) south of Life Saving Station No. 11, 4th District, on the coast of New Jersey, but was dragged along the coast by the high seas and current eventually grounding 1 nautical mile (1.9 km) south of Life Saving Station No. 12. She was wrecked with the loss of two of her seven crew. Survivors were rescued by the United States Life Saving Service.
Island Home	Canada	The ship was driven ashore at Pensacola, Florida, United States.
Kate Newman	United States	Storm of 3 February 1880: The schooner was sunk in a collision with Stephan Harding (United States) 6 or 7 nautical miles (11 or 13 km) off the coast of New Jersey. Lost with the loss of all but one of her crew. The survivor was rescued by Stephan Harding.
Light-Boat	United States	Storm of 3 February 1880: The schooner went aground 200 yards (180 m) offshore in a gale and heavy seas 1 nautical mile (1.9 km) north of Life Saving Station No. 5, 4th District, on the coast of New Jersey. Her five crew were rescued by the United States Life Saving Service. She was a total loss.
Lizzie M. Merrill	United States	The ship foundered in the Atlantic Ocean. Her captain was rescued by Harald Harfanger (Norway). Lizzie M. Merrill was on a voyage from New York to New Orleans, Louisiana.
Maharaja	United Kingdom	The steamship was driven ashore at Bacton, Norfolk. She was on a voyage from Reval, Russia to London. She was refloated.
Pronto	Canada	Storm of 3 February 1880: The schooner was lost in a storm off Grand Eddy Point.
State of Alabama	United Kingdom	The steamship ran aground in the Clyde. She was on a voyage from New York, United States to Glasgow, Renfrewshire. She was refloated on 5 February and taken in to Glasgow.
Stephan Harding	United States	Storm of 3 February 1880: The schooner was damaged in a collision with Kate Newman (United States) causing one anchor to deploy and making the ship unmanageable. She went ashore 1 nautical mile (1.9 km) north of Life Saving Station No. 2 and was lost. All eight people on board were rescued by the United States Life Saving Service.
Sportsman	United Kingdom	The steamship was wrecked near Bergen, Norway. She was on her maiden voyage, from Newcastle upon Tyne, Northumberland to Bergen.
Utopia	United Kingdom	The steamship ran aground in the River Thames at Barking, Essex.
Wilfred J. King	United States	Storm of 3 February 1880:The fishing schooner was wrecked at Brace's Cove. Her crew were rescued.

== 4 February ==
List of shipwrecks: 4 February 1880
Ship	State	Description
Captain McClintock	United Kingdom	The steamship struck rocks 3 nautical miles (5.6 km) south of the Corsewall Lighthouse, Wigtownshire. She was on a voyage from Dublin to Troon, Ayrshire. She was refloated and taken in to Troon for repairs.
Joinville	France	The barque ran aground at Cádiz, Spain. She was on a voyage from Saint-Nazaire, Loire-Inférieure to Cádiz. She was refloated.
Memlo	United States	The ship ran aground in the River Tees. She was on a voyage from Middlesbrough, Yorkshire, United Kingdom to Philadelphia, Pennsylvania.. She was refloated and towed back to Middlesbrough for repairs.
Whitwood	United Kingdom	The steamship ran aground on the Goodwin Sands, Kent. She was refloated.

== 5 February ==
List of shipwrecks: 5 February 1880
Ship	State	Description
Adieu	Norway	The barque was wrecked on the Folle Reefs, off Île-à-Vache, Haiti. Her crew were rescued.
Dalbeattie	United Kingdom	The steamship ran aground at Maassluis, South Holland, Netherlands. She was on a voyage from Bilbao, Spain to Rotterdam, South Holland.
Eleanore	United Kingdom	The barque ran aground on the Shipwash Sand, in the North Sea off the coast of Suffolk. She was on a voyage from Sunderland, County Durham to Cartagena, Spain. She was refloated the next day and anchored by the Cork Lightship ( Trinity House).
Elizabeth Williams	United Kingdom	The schooner ran aground in the Solent. She was on a voyage from Seaham, County Durham to Portsmouth, Hampshire.
Inch Marnock	United Kingdom	The ship was driven ashore at Troubridge Point, South Australia. She was on a voyage from Adelaide, South Australia to a British port. She was refloated with the assistance of a steamship and put back to Adelaide.
Pacific	United Kingdom	The steamship ran aground at Maassluis. She was on a voyage from Harwich, Essex to Rotterdam. She was refloated with assistance on 10 February and resumed her voyage.
Paternita	Italy	The barque ran aground in Cloghy Bay. She was on a voyage from Livorno to Glasgow, Renfrewshire, United Kingdom. She was refloated on 9 February and towed in to Belfast, County Antrim, United Kingdom.
Tern	United Kingdom	The steamship ran aground at Maassluis. She was on a voyage from Rotterdam to London.
Unnamed	Flag unknown	The ship was discovered in a capsized condition 8 nautical miles (15 km) east of Pladda.

== 6 February ==
List of shipwrecks: 6 February 1880
Ship	State	Description
Alvah	Flag unknown	The steamship ran aground in the Suez Canal. She was refloated.
Imprévu	France	The fishing vessel was wrecked in St. Clemet's Bay, Jersey, Channel Islands. Her five crew survived. She was on a voyage from Granville to Cherbourg, Manche.
Lady Kilmarnock	United Kingdom	The schooner was driven ashore at Roanheads, Peterhead, Aberdeenshire. She was on a voyage from Sunderland, County Durham to Peterhead, Aberdeenshire. She was refloated but consequently sank. Her crew survived.
Larch	United Kingdom	The smack was run down and sunk at Shoreham-by-Sea, Sussex by the steamship Commercial (United Kingdom). Her crew were rescued.
Nordstjern	United Kingdom	The smack struck a sunken wreck and sank in the North Sea 45 nautical miles (83 km) off Lowestoft, Suffolk. Her crew were rescued by Perseus (United Kingdom).
Qui Vive	United Kingdom	The fishing dandy collided with the fishing dandy Samuel and Emma (United Kingdom) and sank in the North Sea with the loss of a crew member. Survivors were rescued by Samuel and Emma.

== 7 February ==
List of shipwrecks: 7 February 1880
Ship	State	Description
Alexina	Canada	The brigantine collided with the barque Vittorio (Italy) and sank off Málaga, Spain. Her crew were rescued.
Bay of Biscay	United Kingdom	The ship was sighted in the Atlantic Ocean whilst on a voyage from Rangoon, Burma to Liverpool, Lancashire. No further trace, presumed foundered with the loss of all sixteen crew.
Charles	France	The ship was damaged by fire at New Orleans, Louisiana, United States.
Constance	United Kingdom	The steam yacht collided with the smack Jean de Dieu (France) in the English Channel and was abandoned. Her crew were rescued by Jean de Dieu, which towed Constance in to Fécamp, Seine-Inférieure.
Frisco	Norway	The barque was driven ashore in Silloth Bay. She was refloated.
Frithiof	Norway	The brig was lost off Kragerø. Her crew were rescued.
Harrisons	United Kingdom	The schooner was driven ashore and wrecked at Hartlepool, County Durham. Her crew were rescued by rocket apparatus.
Lady Louisa	United Kingdom	The smack was driven ashore and severely damaged at Waterford.
Maggie A. Fisk	United States	The schooner struck a bar 1 nautical mile (1.9 km) west of Life Saving Station No. 7, 2nd District, on the coast of Massachusetts. Attempts to free her were a failure and she became a total wreck. Her crew were taken off by a tug that was unsuccessful in pulling her off the bar.
Rhea	United States	The ship ran aground at Zierikzee, North Holland. She was on a voyage from Charleston, South Carolina to Rotterdam, South Holland, Netherlands.
Susan	United Kingdom	The schooner was driven ashore at Carrickfergus, County Antrim. She was refloated with assistance.
Trio	United Kingdom	The steamship ran aground at the mouth of the Douro. She was on a voyage from Porto, Portugal to Bilbao, Spain. She was refloated and beached.

== 8 February ==
List of shipwrecks: 8 February 1880
Ship	State	Description
Duart Bay	United Kingdom	The ship foundered in the Bay of Biscay. Her nineteen crew were rescued by L'Esperance (France). Duart Bay was on a voyage from Rangoon, British Burma to Falmouth, Cornwall
Peru	United States	The ship ran aground on the Northern Bank, off the coast of Cornwall, United Kingdom.
Pioneer	United Kingdom	The ketch ran aground at Flamborough Head, Yorkshire and was severely damaged. She was on a voyage from Maldon, Essex to Sunderland, County Durham. She was refloated and taken in to Bridlington, Yorkshire.
Victoire Apoline	France	The ship was driven ashore 2 nautical miles (3.7 km) south west of "Faraman". She was on a voyage from Swansea, Glamorgan, United Kingdom to Marseille, Bouches-du-Rhône, France.

== 9 February ==
List of shipwrecks: 9 February 1880
Ship	State	Description
Agincourt, and Dawn	Argentina; United Kingdom	The barque Agincourt was driven into the brigantine Dawn in a hurricane at Porto, Portugal. Both vessels were damaged.
Anne	United Kingdom	The brig ran aground and sank off Kingsdown, Kent. Her crew survived. She was on a voyage from Hartlepool, County Durham to Cowes, Isle of Wight.
Columbine	United Kingdom	The steamship was damaged by an onboard explosion at Cardiff, Glamorgan. A crew member was killed and two were injured.
Constance	United Kingdom	The steamship foundered in the Bay of Biscay 60 nautical miles (110 km) south east of Ouessant, Finistère, France. Seven crew of her nineteen were rescued by Lady Tredegar (United Kingdom); two crew were rescued by another steamship. Ten were reported missing.
Corea	United States	The barque ran aground in the Green Grounds, in the Bristol Channel off the coast of Glamorgan. She was on a voyage from Newport, Monmouthshire, United Kingdom to Havana, Cuba. She was refloated with assistance.
Dover	United Kingdom	The brigantine was driven ashore near the Dundalk Lighthouse, County Louth. Her six crew were rescued by the Dundalk Lifeboat Stockport Sunday School ( Royal National Lifeboat Institution).
Gerhard	Germany	The ship ran aground on the Goodwin Sands, Kent. She was on a voyage from Hamburg to New York, United States. she was refloated and taken in to Gravesend, Kent.
Golgo, Maria Luiza, and Novo Carteado	Portugal	The brigantine was driven into the barque Maria Luiza and the brig Novo Carteado and sank in a hurricane at Porto. Maria Luiza and Novo Carteado were both severely damaged.
Jane Ellen	United Kingdom	The schooner was driven ashore at Charlestown, Cornwall with the loss of all hands.
Jenny Lind	United Kingdom	The ship ran aground on the Middle Sand, in the North Sea off the coast of Essex. She was on a voyage from London to Leith, Lothian. She was refloated and taken in to Harwich, Essex in a severely leaky condition.
John Wesley	United Kingdom	The schooner was driven ashore and wrecked at Ramsey, Isle of Man. Her five crew were rescued by the Ramsey Lifeboat Two Sisters ( Royal National Lifeboat Institution). John Wesley was on a voyage from Workington, Cumberland to Newport, Monmouthshire.
Julio	Portugal	The schooner was damaged in a hurricane at Porto.
Liguro	Portugal	The brig was damaged in a hurricane at Porto.
Loch Etive	United Kingdom	The steamship was run into by the steamship Marmion and sank in the Clyde at Dalmuir, Dunbartonshire. Her six crew were rescued by the steamship Toward (United Kingdom).
Mathilde	Sweden	The brig was driven ashore on Skagen, Denmark. She was on a voyage from Rouen, Seine-Inférieure, France to Gothenburg.
Nathaniel	Norway	The barque ran aground on the Goodwin Sands. She was on a voyage from Bremen, Germany to New York. She was refloated and taken in to Gravesend.
Robert Nun	United Kingdom	The sloop foundered in the Humber off "Skitterhaven", Lincolnshire. She was on a voyage from Barton upon Humber, Lincolnshire to Beverley, Yorkshire.
Rotterdam	United Kingdom	The steamship ran aground at Maassluis, South Holland. She was on a voyage from New York to Rotterdam, South Holland.
Saga	Sweden	The brig was damaged in a hurricane at Porto.
Sisters	United Kingdom	The schooner was driven ashore approximately 150 yards (140 m) east of the breakwater at Pentewan, Cornwall with the loss of three of her four crew. She was on a voyage from Cardiff, Glamorgan, to Charlestown.
Sofia	Italy	The brig was driven ashore on Polwarth Beach, near St Mawes, Cornwall.
Valentine	France	The steamship foundered off The Lizard, Cornwall, with the loss of seventeen of her eighteen crew. The survivor was rescued by the steamship Campanil (Spain). Valentine was on a voyage from Cardiff to Dieppe, Seine-Inférieure.
Vidar	Sweden	The steamship ran aground at Gothenburg. She was on a voyage from Newcastle upon Tyne, Northumberland, United Kingdom to Gothenburg.
Zio Lorenzo	Italy	The barque was towed in to Middlesbrough, Yorkshire, United Kingdom in a sinking condition by the steamship Minnie Irvine (United Kingdom). She was on a voyage from Middlesbrough to Baltimore, Maryland, United States.

== 10 February ==
List of shipwrecks: 10 February 1880
Ship	State	Description
Corea	United States	The barque ran aground on the Greengrounds, in the Bristol Channel, Her crew were rescued by the Mumbles Lifeboat. Corea was later refloated and taken in to Swansea, Glamorgan, United Kingdom.
Corsica, and Nostre Padre	United States; Italy	The barque Nostre Padre collided with the full-rigged ship Corsica in the Atlantic Ocean (48°30′N 8°00′W) and was abandoned by her crew, who were rescued by Corsica. Both vessels were severely damaged. Corsica was on a voyage from London, United Kingdom to New York. Nostre Padre was on a voyage from Genoa to Cardiff, Glamorgan. Corsica put ten of her crew on board. She was towed in to Falmouth, Cornwall, United Kingdom.
Dorothy Thompson	United Kingdom	The barque was abandoned at sea. Her crew were rescued by Louisa Fletcher (United Kingdom). She was subsequently discovered in the English Channel 25 nautical miles (46 km) south east of The Lizard, Cornwall by Clara and Madge Wildfire (both United Kingdom), which put five crew on board, but they had to abandon Dorothy Thompson' when a spar fell and holed her, causing her to founder.
Nimrod	United Kingdom	The smack was driven ashore at Cromer, Norfolk. She was on a voyage from Montrose, Forfarshire to Looe, Cornwall. She was refloated and assisted in to Great Yarmouth, Norfolk.
Truth	United Kingdom	The schooner ran aground on the Cork Sand, in the North Sea off the coast of Essex. She was on a voyage from Newcastle upon Tyne, Northumberland to London. She was refloated and resumed her voyage.
William C. Webb	United Kingdom	The pilot cutter was driven ashore at the mouth of the River Usk. She caught fire and was severely damaged.
Yarra Yarra	United Kingdom	The ship was driven ashore on the coast of Somerset. She was on a voyage from San Francisco, California, United States to Gloucester. She was refloated and taken in to Avonmouth, Somerset in a leaky condition.

== 11 February ==
List of shipwrecks: 11 February 1880
Ship	State	Description
Brazilian	United Kingdom	The steamship ran aground at Liverpool, Lancashire. She was on a voyage from Boston, Massachusetts, United States to Liverpool. She was refloated and taken in to Birkenhead, Cheshire.
Fulica	United Kingdom	The steamship was run into by the steamship Eden (United Kingdom) and sank in the Red Sea off the Ashraffi Lighthouse. Her crew were rescued. Fulica was on a voyage from Cardiff, Glamorgan to Aden, Aden Governorate.
Monica	United Kingdom	The steamship ran aground on the Cross Sand, in the North Sea off the coast of Norfolk.She was refloated and resumed her voyage.
Schiaffino	Italy	The ship ran aground off Sunderland, County Durham. She was on a voyage from New York, United States to South Shields, County Durham. She was refloated and completed her voyage in a leaky condition.
Seaton	United Kingdom	The steamship collided with another vessel off the north coast of Cornwall and was abandoned with the loss of a crew member. She was on a voyage from Cardiff, Glamorgan to Malta. She was reboarded by the survivors the next day and put back to Penarth, Glamorgan in a leaky condition.
Sprite	United Kingdom	The brigantine was driven ashore on the Holy Isle, in the Firth of Clyde. Her crew were rescued the next day. She was on a voyage from Ardrossan, Ayrshire to Drogheda, County Louth.

== 12 February ==
List of shipwrecks: 12 February 1880
Ship	State	Description
Anatolian	United Kingdom	The steamship ran aground on the Burbo Bank, in Liverpool Bay and broke in two. Her crew were rescued by the New Brighton Lifeboat. She was on a voyage from Liverpool, Lancashire to Genoa, Italy.
Archer	United States	The barque foundered. Her crew were rescued by the steamship Naworth Castle (United Kingdom). Archer was on a voyage from New York to Havre de Grâce, Seine-Inférieure, France.
Baltic	United Kingdom	The brigantine was driven ashore and wrecked 9 nautical miles (17 km) west of Llanelly, Glamorgan. Her crew were rescued. She was on a voyage from Swansea, Glamorgan to Lisbon, Portugal.
Barcelona	Flag unknown	The ship struck a rock and was beached at Cherbourg, Manche, France.
Barlochan	United Kingdom	The ship was driven ashore and severely damaged at Réthoville, Manche. She was on a voyage from Old Calabar, Africa to Havre de Grâce.
Discoverer	United Kingdom	The steamship ran aground at Gibraltar. She was on a voyage from Calcutta, India to London. She was refloated and resumed her voyage.
Oneida	United Kingdom	The full-rigged ship ran aground at Antwerp, Belgium. She was on a voyage from San Francisco, California to Antwerp. She was refloated with the assistance of four tugs but ran aground again.
Orquell	Canada	The ship collided with another vessel 18 nautical miles (33 km) off the Runnel Stone, Cornwall, United Kingdom and was severely damaged. She was on a voyage from Rouen, Seine-Inférieure, France to Workington, Cumberland, United Kingdom. She continued her voyage, but put in to Barrow-in-Furness, Lancashire on 13 February.

== 13 February ==
List of shipwrecks: 13 February 1880
Ship	State	Description
Christine	United Kingdom	The ship departed from Sunderland, County Durham for Ystad, Sweden. No further trace, reported overdue.
Essex	United Kingdom	The ship ran aground in the River Colne. She was on a voyage from Colchester to Mistley, Essex. She was refloated.
Fanny	United Kingdom	The schooner was run into by the steamship Bavarian and sank several nautical miles off Queenstown, County Cork with the loss of all but one of her five crew. The survivor was rescued by Bavarian. Fanny was on a voyage from Cardiff, Glamorgan to Cork.
Fanny	France	The sloop was driven ashore and wrecked at Arvert, Charente-Inférieure.
Guldbringa	Norway	The barque was run into by the full-rigged ship Hercules (Norway) at Vlissingen, Zeeland, Netherlands and was severely damaged. Guldbringa was on a voyage from Antwerp, Belgium to Baltimore, Maryland, United States. She was towed in to Vlissingen.
Gwalia	United Kingdom	The ship was wrecked in the Karimata Islands, Netherlands East Indies. Her 30 crew were rescued by Glory (Siam). Gwalea was on a voyage from Newcastle upon Tyne, Northumberland to Singapore, Straits Settlements.
Hesperia	United Kingdom	The ship ran aground at Queenstown, County Cork. She was refloated.
Ida	United Kingdom	The steamship was driven through the Newcross Bridge, Waterford and severely damaged.
Kate	United Kingdom	The fishing boat capsized while entering the harbour at Wexford, with the loss of all but one of her four crew. The survivor was rescued by the Wexford Lifeboat.
Leander A. Knowles	United States	The schooner stranded on Handkerchief Shoals 9 nautical miles (17 km) south west of Life Saving Station No. 13, 2nd District, on the coast of Massachusetts. She was abandoned by her crew the next day. She was a total loss.
Modesta	Bermuda	The ship was abandoned in the Atlantic Ocean (42°30′N 46°30′W). Her crew were rescued by the steamship Assyria (United Kingdom). Modesta was on a voyage from New York, United States to Dunkirk, Nord, France.
Saint Joseph	France	The sloop was driven ashore and wrecked at Arvert.
Slater	United Kingdom	The schooner ran aground off Gray Island, in the Sound of Mull. She was on a voyage from Port Dinorwic, Caernarfonshire to Lossiemouth, Moray. She was refloated and beached at Tobermory, Isle of Mull.
Strathnairn	United Kingdom	The barque collided with the steamship Edith Hough (United Kingdom), in the Atlantic Ocean 37 nautical miles (69 km) west of Ouessant, Finistère, France with the loss of all on board. Two casks of brandy, from her cargo, were picked up in the Isles of Scilly in April.
Tartar	United Kingdom	The fishing smack capsized off the mouth of the River Boyne with the loss of all five crew.
Trimountain	United States	The full-rigged ship was abandoned in the Atlantic Ocean (43°40′N 36°20′W). Her eighteen crew were rescued by Othello (United Kingdom). Trimountain was on a voyage from New York to Bremen, Germany.

== 14 February ==
List of shipwrecks: 14 February 1880
Ship	State	Description
Ardington, and Bickley	United Kingdom	The steamships collided at Cartagena, Spain. Ardington sank with the loss of a crew member. She was on a voyage from Cartagena to Portmán, Spain. Bickley was on a voyage from Alicante to Cartagena. She was severely damaged.
Bravo	United Kingdom	The fishing dandy ran aground and sank at Lowestoft, Suffolk. She subsequently became a wreck.
Caroline Sainty	(United Kingdom of Great Britain and Ireland) Guernsey	The barque collided with the steamship Douglas (United Kingdom) and sank off Whitby, Yorkshire. Her eight crew were rescued by Douglas. Caroline Sainty was on a voyage from Kennetpans, Clackmannanshire to Morlaix, Finistère, France.
Cinque Ports	United Kingdom	The schooner was driven ashore and wrecked at Rye, Sussex. Her crew were rescued.
City of Baltimore	United Kingdom	The steamship ran aground on the Flagstaff Shoal, in the Hooghly River. She was on a voyage from Liverpool, Lancashire to Bombay, India.
Comet	United Kingdom	The ship was driven ashore at Dunmore, County Galway.
Guiding Star	United Kingdom	The barque was wrecked on The Skerries, Anglesey. All seven people on board were rescued by the Cemaes Lifeboat Ashtonian ( Royal National Lifeboat Institution). Guiding Star was on a voyage from Garston, Lancashire to Salcombe, Devon.
Gypsy	(Dominion of Newfoundland) Newfoundland Colony	The brigantine went aground at Downes Cove, on the east coast of The Lizard, Cornwall, United Kingdom. All nine crew managed to climb ashore just before the ship broke up. She was on a voyage from the Newfoundland Colony to Falmouth, Cornwall. Also reported that one life was lost.
Ibex, and Kenley	United Kingdom	The sailing barge Ibex collided with the steamship Kenley and sank in the North Sea off Flamborough Head, Yorkshire with the loss of two of her four crew. Survivors were rescued by Kenley. Ibex was on a voyage from Hartlepool, County Durham to Whitstable, Kent. Kenley was on a voyage from Seaham, County Durham to Rochester, Kent. She was beached at South Shields, County Durham.
Kate	United Kingdom	The fishing boat capsized at Wexford with the loss of three of her four crew. The survivor was rescued by the Wexford Lifeboat Civil Service ( Royal National Lifeboat Institution).
Lady of the Lake	United Kingdom	The schooner was driven ashore and wrecked on Jura. Her crew were rescued. She was on a voyage from Portsoy, Aberdeenshire to Ardbeg, Islay.
Margaret Jane	United Kingdom	The ship was driven ashore at Omeath, County Louth.
Rapid	United Kingdom	The paddle tug ran aground and sank at Sunderland, County Durham. Her crew were rescued.
Stavanger	Norway	The ship was abandoned in the Atlantic Ocean. Her crew were rescued by Martha (United Kingdom). Stavanger was on a voyage from New York, United States to Liverpool, Lancashire, United Kingdom.
Unnamed	United Kingdom	The fishing boat was wrecked at the mouth of the River Boyne with the loss of four lives.

== 15 February ==
List of shipwrecks: 15 January 1880
Ship	State	Description
Albion	United Kingdom	The steamship collided with the steamship Dragon (United Kingdom) in the River Thames and was beached at the Coalhouse Fort, Essex. Albion was on a voyage from London to Berwick upon Tweed, Northumberland.
Berma	Canada	The schooner struck a rock near the entrance to Head Harbor, Maine, United States. She sprang a leak and was beached to effect repairs.
Eugene	France	The schooner was driven ashore and wrecked at Rickham, Devon, United Kingdom with the loss of all hands.
Gazelle	United Kingdom	The schooner was abandoned in the Atlantic Ocean with the loss of a crew member. Survivors were rescued by the barque Minda (Norway). Gazelle was on a voyage from New York, United States to Exeter, Devon.
Glenares	United Kingdom	The barque ran aground in Silloth Bay. She was on a voyage from Maryport, Cumberland to Philadelphia, Pennsylvania, United States. She was refloated.
Mistress of the Seas	United Kingdom	The ship was abandoned in the Atlantic Ocean. Her 40 crew were rescued by the ful-rigged ship Hermann (Germany) and the steamship Ivy (United States) and she was set afire. Mistress of the Seas was on a voyage from Philadelphia to Bremerhaven, Germany.
Parkside	United Kingdom	The brigantine was driven ashore in Dundalk Bay. Her crew were rescued. She was on a voyage from Newport, Monmouthshire to Dundalk, County Louth.
Patrie	Norway	The brig was in collision with the steamship Graphic (United Kingdom) in the English Channel off Brighton, Sussex, United Kingdom and was abandoned by her crew, who were rescued by HMRC Frances ( Board of Customs). Patrie was subsequently towed in to Newhaven, Sussex by the tugboat Robert Bruce (United Kingdom).
Prince Oscar	United Kingdom	The full-rigged ship was driven ashore at St. Mawes, Cornwall. She was on a voyage from Calcutta, India to Dundee, Forfarshire. She was refloated with assistance from the tug Stormcock (United Kingdom).
Rialto	United Kingdom	The ship ran aground at Falmouth, Cornwall. She was on a voyage from London to Otago, New Zealand. She was refloated.
Surprise	United Kingdom	The schooner was driven ashore at Middleton, County Durham. Her crew survived. She was on a voyage from Great Yarmouth, Norfolk to Hartlepool, County Durham.
William Fisher	United Kingdom	The barque was driven ashore in Swansea Bay. She was on a voyage from Pensacola, Florida, United States to Swansea, Glamorgan.

== 16 February ==
List of shipwrecks: 16 February 1880
Ship	State	Description
Ada Letitia, and Marion	United Kingdom	The schooner Marion was driven ashore in the Cattewater. She was refloated with assistance from the tug Secret (United Kingdom) but then collided with Ada Letitia, which was holed. Both vessels were beached. Marion was on a voyage from Cowes, Isle of Wight to Tralee, County Kerry.
Augusta	Sweden	The schooner was driven ashore 3 nautical miles (5.6 km) north of Peterhead, Aberdeenshire, United Kingdom. Her five crew were rescued by the Coastguard using rocket apparatus. She was on a voyage from Fiskebäkskil to Bo'ness, Lothian, United Kingdom.
Comet	United Kingdom	The schooner was driven ashore and wrecked in Luce Bay. Her crew were rescued.
Eglantine	United Kingdom	The brig ran aground at Hartlepool, County Durham. She was on a voyage from Seaham, County Durham to Rochester, Kent. She was refloated and beached.
Gustav Oscar	United Kingdom	The ship was driven ashore in the Nieuwe Diep. She was on a voyage from New York to Bremen. She was refloated on 18 February and towed in to Bremen.
Idol	United Kingdom	The schooner was driven ashore in Luce Bay. Her crew were rescued. She was on a voyage from Maryport, Cumberland to Londonderry.
Isabella	United Kingdom	The schooner was driven ashore and wrecked at Aberdeen. Both crew were rescued by the Aberdeen Lifeboat. She was on a voyage from "Morrisonhaven" to Aberdeen.
Johannes	United Kingdom	The schooner was driven ashore at Hollesley, Suffolk. Her crew were rescued. She was on a voyage from Clacton-on-Sea, Essex to West Hartlepool, County Durham.
Julia	United Kingdom	The brig was abandoned 200 nautical miles (370 km) west of the Azores. Her crew were rescued by the steamship Alexandria (United Kingdom). Julia was on a voyage from Puerto Cabello, Venezuela to Swansea, Glamorgan.
Julia	United Kingdom	The ship was abandoned at sea. She was on a voyage from Puerto Cabello, Venezuela to Swansea, Glamorgan.
Mabel	United Kingdom	The steamship was driven ashore and wrecked at Boarhills, Fife. Her crew were rescued by the Saint Andrews Lifeboat. She was on a voyage from Montrose, Forfarshire to Leith, Lothian.
Mary Ellen	United Kingdom	The brig ran aground in the River Foyle. She subsequently capsized and sank.
Mary Ann	United Kingdom	The ship was driven ashore at Blackrock, County Louth. Her four crew were rescued by a fishing boat.
Neptunus	Norway	The brig was driven ashore and wrecked at Auchmithie, Forfarshire, United Kingdom with the loss of all but one of her nine crew. She was on a voyage from Christiania to a British port.
Stella	United Kingdom	The ship was driven ashore in Dundalk Bay. Her crew were rescued.
Thomas and Elizabeth	United Kingdom	The brig was driven ashore and wrecked at North Shields, Northumberland with the loss of all seven crew. She was on a voyage from Kennetpans, Clackmannanshire to North Shields.
Unity	United Kingdom	The brig was driven ashore at Hartlepool and was abandoned by her crew. She was on a voyage from Seaham, County Durham to London.
Unnamed	Flag unknown	The ship was driven ashore at Blackrock.

== 17 February ==
List of shipwrecks: 17 February 1880
Ship	State	Description
Beryl	United Kingdom	The newly-launched steamship was run into by another steamship and severely damaged at Stockton-on-Tees, County Durham.
Catherine	Denmark	The schooner was abandoned in the North Sea. Her crew were rescued by the fishing smack Mysterious (United Kingdom). Catherine was on a voyage from Farø to Grimsby, Lincolnshire, United Kingdom. She was taken into the River Tyne the next day.
Lagos	Norway	The barque was driven ashore and wrecked in the Rio Grande. She was on a voyage from the Rio Grande to Pernambuco, Brazil.
Maria Wilhelmina	Germany	The barque was lost off the coast of Portugal with the loss of eight of her twelve crew. She was on a voyage from Liverpool, Lancashire, United Kingdom to Baltimore, Maryland, United States.
RMS Medway	United Kingdom	The steamship ran aground on the Rochelois Rock, off the coast of Haiti. She was refloated and resumed her voyage.
Silesia	Germany	The steamship ran aground at Finkenwerder. She was on a voyage from Hamburg to New York, United States.
Star	United Kingdom	The schooner was severely damaged by fire at Margate, Kent.
Varuna	United Kingdom	The ship was struck by lightning and set afire in the Atlantic Ocean. She was on a voyage from New Orleans, Louisiana, United States to Falmouth, Cornwall. The fire was extinguished and she resumed her voyage.
Vasco de Gama	Spain	The steamship ran aground at Finkenwerder. She was on a voyage from Hamburg to Valencia.

== 18 February ==
List of shipwrecks: 18 February 1880
Ship	State	Description
Calypso	United Kingdom	The steamship ran aground in the Gironde.
Comet	United Kingdom	The schooner was driven ashore at "New Passage". She was on a voyage from Gloucester to Bristol, Gloucestershire.
Il Vero	Italy	The ship was damaged by fire at Marseille, Bouches-du-Rhône, France. She was on a voyage from New York, United States to Marseille.
Lucy	United Kingdom	The schooner was wrecked at Lisbon, Portugal. Her crew were rescued by the Lisbon Lifeboat. She was on a voyage from Saint John's, Newfoundland Colony to Lisbon.
Wyvern	United Kingdom	The steamship ran aground at Huelva, Spain. She was on a voyage from Huelva to the River Tyne.
Six unnamed vessels	Portugal	The fishing boats were wrecked at Peniche.

== 19 February ==
List of shipwrecks: 19 February 1880
Ship	State	Description
Amanda	United Kingdom	The ship ran aground at Royan, Charente-Inférieure. She was on a voyage from Liverpool, Lancashire to Bilbao, Spain. Amanda was refloated and towed in to Bordeaux, Gironde in a leaky condition. She was placed under repair.
Isabella	United Kingdom	The ship was abandoned in the Atlantic Ocean with the loss of eight of her crew. Survivors were rescued by the steamship Otto Graf (Germany).
Para	United Kingdom	The steamship struck reefs off Cape Sable Island, Nova Scotia, Canada and foundered. Her 21 crew were rescued. She was on a voyage from Boston, Massachusetts, United States to Liverpool, Lancashire.
Santos	Germany	The steamship ran aground at Schulau. She was on a voyage from Hamburg to Brazil.
Schiller	Germany	The barque foundered near "Tisilarne". Her crew were rescued. She was on a voyage from Batavia, Netherlands East Indies to Landskrona, Sweden.
Silas Curtis	United Kingdom	The barque caught fire and sank in the West India Docks, London.
Wanderer	Canada	The brig was abandoned in the Atlantic Ocean 200 nautical miles (370 km) west of the Outer Hebrides, United Kingdom. Her crew were rescued by the barque Arctic (Norway). Wanderer was on a voyage from Saint John, New Brunswick to Barcelona, Spain.
Wild Wave	United Kingdom	The brig was abandoned in the Atlantic Ocean. Her crew were rescued by the schooner Reis and Co. (Portugal). Wild Wave was on a voyage from New York, United States to a Spanish port.
William	Norway	The barque was abandoned 18 nautical miles (33 km) north of Papa Westray, Orkney Islands, United Kingdom. Her nine crew were rescued. She was on a voyage from Hartlepool, County Durham, United Kingdom to Holmestrand.
Unnamed	Flag unknown	The ship was driven ashore at the Pointe de la Coubre, Charente-Inférieure, France.
Unnamed	Flag unknown	The frigate was driven ashore on Vlieland, Friesland, Netherlands.
Two unnamed vesseks	Flags unknown	The ships ran aground on the Maplin Sands, in the North Sea off the coast of Essex, United Kingdom.

== 20 February ==
List of shipwrecks: 20 February 1880
Ship	State	Description
County of Elgin	United Kingdom	The ship was abandoned in the Atlantic Ocean (41°00′N 30°33′W). Her crew were rescued by Eleanor (United Kingdom). City of Elgin foundered the next day. She was on a voyage from Surabaya, Netherlands East Indies to Glasgow, Renfrewshire.
John Abbott	United Kingdom	The barque was damaged in a hurricane and was abandoned in the Atlantic Ocean. Her crew were rescued by the barque Lucedio (Italy). John Abbott was on a voyage from Doboy, Georgia, United States to London.
Lloyd's	Germany	The ship was abandoned in the Atlantic Ocean. Her crew were rescued by the steamship Orator (United Kingdom). Lloyd's was on a voyage from Pensacola, Florida, United States to Liverpool, Lancashire, United Kingdom.
Ottolina	Netherlands	The ship ran aground at Tanjong Pakam, Netherlands East Indies. She was refloated, and resumed her voyage the next day.
Svalen	Denmark	The schooner was discovered abandoned in the North Sea by the smack Brill (United Kingdom), which towed her in to Hull, Yorkshire, United Kingdom.

== 21 February ==
List of shipwrecks: 21 February 1880
Ship	State	Description
Louis de Geer	Sweden	The ship went ashore on Grönskär. She was on a voyage from Batavia, Netherlands East Indies to Stockholm. Refloated 23 February, undamaged but leaky, and went for repairs at Gothenburg.
Louise	Norway	The full-rigged ship was abandoned in the Atlantic Ocean. Her crew were rescued by Morning Star (United Kingdom) and she was set afire. Louise was on a voyage from Philadelphia, Pennsylvania, United States to Antwerp, Belgium.

== 22 February ==
List of shipwrecks: 22 February 1880
Ship	State	Description
Craigs	United Kingdom	The ship was abandoned in the Atlantic Ocean. Her crew were rescued by Thanemore (United Kingdom). Craigs was on a voyage from Pensacola, Florida, United States to Greenock, Renfrewshire. She was discovered on 25 February by the steamship Teutonia (United Kingdom), which put twele crew aboard. They took her in to Queenstown, County Cork.
Forager	United Kingdom	The ketch was driven ashore at Kingsgate, Kent. Her crew were rescued.
Glenlussa	United Kingdom	The smack ran aground on the Angus Rock. She was on a voyage from Rothesay, Isle of Bute to Dublin. She was refloated the next day.
Hindoo	United Kingdom	The steamship foundered in the Atlantic Ocean (41°50′N 41°05′W) with the loss of six of the 59 people on board. Survivors were rescued by the steamship Alexandria (United Kingdom). Hindoo was on a voyage from New York, United States to Hull. Yorkshire.
Linwood	United Kingdom	The brig ran aground at Maryport, Cumberland. She was on a voyage from Maryport to Dublin. She was refloated and resumed her voyage.
Orlen	United Kingdom	The barque was abandoned at sea. Her crew were rescued. She was on a voyage from New York to Gijón, Spain.
Ulster	Canada	The waterlogged barque was abandoned at sea with the loss of four of her sixteen crew. Survivors were rescued by the steamship Hipparchus (United Kingdom). Ulster was on a voyage from Saint Johh, New Brunswick to London, United Kingdom.

== 23 February ==
List of shipwrecks: 23 February 1880
Ship	State	Description
Burgermeister Schwing	Germany	The ship was damaged by fire at Danzig.
Cattarina Cappurro, and William Dawson	Italy; United Kingdom	The barque Cattarina Cappurro collided with the steamship William Dawson in the North Sea off the Cork Lightship ( Trinity House). Both vessels were severely damaged. Cattarina Cappurro was on a voyage from Hull, Yorkshire to Baltimore, Maryland, United States. She was towed in to Harwich, Essex. William Dawson put in to Lowestoft, Suffolk.
Marguerite	France	The ketch ran aground on the Brake Sand. She was on a voyage from Antwerp, Belgium to Saint-Brieuc, Côtes-du-Nord. She was refloated.
Marianne Briggs	United Kingdom	The steamship ran aground at Blankenese, Germany.
Progress	United Kingdom	The schooner collided with the steamship City of Chester (United Kingdom) in the River Mersey. Progress was on a voyage from Liverpool, Lancashire to Wicklow. She was beached at New Ferry, Cheshire.
Ziga	Austria-Hungary	The barque was wrecked at Saint Thomas, Virgin Islands. Her crew were rescued. She was on a voyage from Tenerife, Canary Islands to Trinidad.

== 24 February ==
List of shipwrecks: 24 February 1880
Ship	State	Description
A. M. Roselands	United Kingdom	The brigantine was abandoned in the Atlantic Ocean (38°50′N 039°40′W). Her crew were rescued by Kaut Alpsen (Flag unknown). A. M. Roselands was on a voyage from Port Castries, St Lucia to Falmouth, Cornwall.
Evening Star	United Kingdom	The ship was beached at New York. She was on a voyage from Pernambuco, Brazil to New York.
G. W. Ward	United Kingdom	The steamship ran aground in the Suez Canal. She was on a voyage from Newport, Monmouthshire to Bombay, India.
Josephine	France	The lugger foundered in the English Channel off Dungeness, Kent, United Kingdom. Her crew survived. She was on a voyage from Fécamp, Seine-Inférieure to La Rochelle, Charente-Inférieure.
Mystery	United Kingdom	The barque ran aground in the Rocas Atoll, Brazil and foundered. Her crew were rescued.
Raven	United Kingdom	The ship ran aground at Llanelly, Glamorgan.
Statesman	United Kingdom	The ship ran aground at Llanelly.
Triad	United Kingdom	The schooner was driven ashore at Burghead, Moray. She was on a voyage from Burghead to Dunkirk, Nord, France. She was refloated the next day and taken in to Burghead in a leaky condition.

== 25 February ==
List of shipwrecks: 25 February 1880
Ship	State	Description
Bessie Jones	United Kingdom	The schooner was wrecked on the Salthouse Bank, in the Irish Sea off Blackpool, Lancashire with the loss of one of her four crew. Survivors were rescued the Blackpool Lifeboat. Bessie Jones was on a voyage from Glasgow, Renfrewshire to Liverpool, Lancashire. She was refloated in July.
Elsie	United Kingdom	The steamship departed from the River Tyne for Hamburg, Germany. No further trace, reported overdue.
Henry	United Kingdom	The Thames barge was run into by Peeblesshire (United Kingdom) and sank in the River Thames at Limehouse, Middlesex.
Jane	United Kingdom	The Mersey Flat was holed by the propeller of the steamship Egypt (United Kingdom) and sank at Liverpool, Lancashire.
MacMahon	United Kingdom	The schooner was abandoned in the North Sea 25 nautical miles (46 km) south east of the Orkney Islands. Her crew were rescued. She was on a voyage from Middlesbrough, Yorkshire to Kristiansand, Norway.
Mystery	United Kingdom	The barque was wrecked at "St. Roche", Brazil. Her crew survived. She was on a voyage from New York, United States to "Anger Point".
Resurgam II	United Kingdom	The submarine sank without loss of life in Liverpool Bay off Rhyl, Denbighshire, whilst under tow.
Sea Nymph	United Kingdom	The brig was wrecked at Zierikzee, North Holland, Netherlands. Her crew were rescued.

== 26 February ==
List of shipwrecks: 26 February 1880
Ship	State	Description
Borga	United Kingdom	The ship ran aground at IJmuiden, North Holland, Netherlands.
Derwent	United Kingdom	The steamship arrived at Trinidad on fire. The fire was extinguished.
Elsie	United Kingdom	The steamship departed from the River Tyne for Hamburg, Germany. No further trace, reported missing.
Polar Star	United Kingdom	The ship foundered in the North Sea.
Ringleader	United Kingdom	The brigantine collided with the steamship Orator (United Kingdom) at Liverpool, Lancashire. Ringleader was towed in to Liverpool by the tug Iron King but sank. Her crew were rescued by the tug. She was on a voyage from Salcombe, Devon to Liverpool. She was refloated on 4 March and taken in to Liverpool.
Unnamed	United Kingdom	The smack capsized and sank off Piel Island, Lancashire with the loss of all hands.

== 27 February ==
List of shipwrecks: 27 February 1880
Ship	State	Description
Christine	Germany	The schooner ran aground. She was on a voyage from Faro, Portugal to Hamburg. She was refloated and taken in to Cuxhaven in a leaky condition.
Dannebrog	Denmark	The ship ran aground off Fredrikshavn. She was on a voyage from Copenhagen to Bordeaux, Gironde, France. She was refloated and take in to Fredrikshavn in a leaky condition.
Despatch	United Kingdom	The ship ran aground at Whitby, Yorkshire. She was on a voyage from Wells-next-the-Sea, Norfolk to Stockton-on-Tees, County Durham. She was refloated and taken in to Whitby in a leaky condition.
Otto Eichmann	Germany	The steamship ran aground at "Schwartztonnensteer".

== 28 February ==
List of shipwrecks: 28 February 1880
Ship	State	Description
James	United Kingdom	The Thames barge caught fire at Harwich, Essex and was scuttled.
Vingoria	United Kingdom	The steamship sprang a leak and foundered 70 nautical miles (130 km) off Bombay, India with the loss of 63 of the 285 people on board. She was on a voyage from Bombay to Kurrachee, India. All but one of the survivors were rescued by the steamships Britannia and Malwa (both United Kingdom).

== 29 February ==
List of shipwrecks: 29 February 1880
Ship	State	Description
Mary Stewart	Canada	The ship ran aground at Littlehampton, Sussex, United Kingdom. She was on a voyage from South Shields, County Durham, United Kingdom to Baltimore, Maryland, United States. She was refloated and resumed her voyage.

== Unknown date ==
List of shipwrecks: Unknown date in February 1879
Ship	State	Description
Adelaide	United States	The ship was run ashore and wrecked on Gran Canaria, Canary Islands. Her crew were rescued. She was on a voyage from Livorno, Italy to Baltimore, Maryland.
A. F. Nordmann	Germany	The barque was abandoned in the Atlantic Ocean before 24 February. She was on a voyage from Galveston, Texas, United States to Aberdeen, United Kingdom.
Alexander Marshall	United States	The ship was abandoned in the Atlantic Ocean. Her 27 crew were rescued by the steamship Thingvalla (Denmark). Alexander Marshall was on a voyage from New York to London, United Kingdom.
Annie	United Kingdom	The Mersey Flat sprang a leak and sank at Liverpool, Lancashire.
Archer	United States	The barque foundered in the Atlantic Ocean. Her crew were rescued by a British steamship. She was on a voyage from New York to Havre de Grâce, Seine-Inférieure.
HMS Atalanta	Royal Navy	The training ship foundered in the Atlantic Ocean off the Azores sometime between 12 and 16 February during a storm with the loss of all hands. She had on board 11 officers and approximately 300 young seamen.
Barrington	United Kingdom	The steamship was driven ashore in the Seine at Quillebeuf-sur-Seine, Eure, France. She was on a voyage from Neath, Glamorgan to Rouen, Seine-Inférieure, France. She was refloated on 7 February and taken in to Rouen in a leaky condition.
Bates Family	United Kingdom	The smack was lost in the North Sea before 20 February. Her crew were rescued by the smack Brill (United Kingdom).
Bay of Biscay	United Kingdom	The ship was lost in the Atlantic Ocean.
Belmont	United Kingdom	The ship was abandoned in the Atlantic Ocean (40°50′N 031°33′W). Her crew were rescued by the schooner Faithlie (Flag unknown).
Bridgewater	United Kingdom	The tug was driven ashore and wrecked on Flat Holm.
Christopher Columbus	Germany	The ship was abandoned at sea. She was on a voyage from Doboy, Georgia, United States to Marseille, Bouches-du-Rhône, France.
City of London	United Kingdom	The steamship was driven ashore in the Swash Channel. She was on a voyage from London to New York. She was refloated.
Concordia	Norway	The brig struck a rock near Egersund and was wrecked. All on board were rescued. She was on a voyage from Hull, Yorkshire, United Kingdom to Arendal.
Derby	United Kingdom	The brig was abandoned at sea before 26 February. Her crew were rescued by the barque Resolute (United Kingdom).
Dockea	United Kingdom	The fishing smack was run down and sunk in the North Sea before 9 February. Her crew were rescued by the fishing smack Crown (United Kingdom).
Emily	United Kingdom	The steamship as driven ashore near Rouen. She was on a voyage from London to Rouen. She was refloated on 24 February.
Empire	United Kingdom	The ship sprang a leak and was abandoned off Tory Island, County Donegal. Her crew were rescued by Collare (United Kingdom).
Florida	Norway	The barque foundered off Bergen. She was on a voyage from Middlesbrough, Yorkshire, United Kingdom to New York.
Forrager	United Kingdom	The ketch was driven ashore at Kingsgate, Kent. Her crew were rescued. She was on a voyage from Seaham, County Durham to Chichester, Sussex. She was refloated and towed in to Ramsgate, Kent.
Fram	Norway	The barque struck Paterson's Rock and capsized with the loss of all hands. She was on a voyage from Wilmington, Delaware, United States to Glasgow, Renfrewshire. She was towed in to Lamlash, Isle of Arran, United Kingdom. She was subsequently righted and towed in to Glasgow.
Frithjof	Sweden	The brig was driven ashore at Cresswell, Northumberland, United Kingdom. Her crew survived.
Greta	United Kingdom	The steamship sank in the Ría de Bilbao.
Hectanooga	United Kingdom	The ship was damaged by fire at New Orleans, Louisiana, United States.
Inkerman	United Kingdom	The sloop ran aground on the Whitby Rock. She was on a voyage from Tynemouth, Northumberland to Woolwich, Kent. She was refloated and resumed her voyage.
Irwell	United Kingdom	The ship was abandoned at sea. She was on a voyage from Bremen to an American port.
Jessica	United Kingdom	The ship was wrecked on Grand Cayman, Cayman Islands. Her crew were rescued. She was on a voyage from Berbice, British Guiana to Minatitlán, Mexico.
John and Eliza	United Kingdom	The smack was wrecked at Barrow-in-Furness, Lancashire with the loss of all hands.
Josephine	France	The schooner was driven ashore at Llantwit Major, Glamorgan, United Kingdom. She broke up on 13 February and the wreck drifted out to sea.
Karo	United Kingdom	The steamship ran aground on the Potato Garth. She was refloated and taken in to Sunderland, County Durham.
Lady Blessington	United Kingdom	The ship was run into by the steamship Ban Righ (United Kingdom) and sank in the River Thames at London. Lady Blessington was on a voyage from London to Philadelphia, Pennsylvania, United States. She was refloated on 2 February and beached.
Leonia	United Kingdom	The barque ran aground at Saint John, New Brunswick, Canada. She was on a voyage from Liverpool to Saint John.
Livonia	(United Kingdom of Great Britain and Ireland) Jersey	The ketch was driven ashore at Lydd, Kent. She was refloated.
Louisa	United Kingdom	The ketch was abandoned off Clovelly, Devon. All four people on board were rescued by the Clovelly Lifeboat. She was on a voyage from Bideford, Devon to Newport, Monmouthshire.
Louise Marie Philomène	France	The ship, a lugger or a schooner, was run down and sunk off the Nash Point Lighthouse, Glamorgan by the steamship Henry Anning (United Kingdom). Her three crew were rescued.
Louise Sophie	Netherlands	The ship was driven ashore on Texel, North Holland. Her crew were rescued. She was on a voyage from Antwerp, Belgium to Brake, Germany.
Maranhanse	Flag unknown	The steamship ran aground in the Strait of Magellan before 9 February. She was refloated and taken in to Sandy Point, Chile.
Mary Jones	United Kingdom	The ship struck a rock and was wrecked on Skokholm, Pembrokeshire. She was on a voyage from Llanelly, Glamorgan to Skerries, County Dublin.
Manilla	Italy	The steamship was driven ashore near Perim, Aden Settlement before 7 February. She was on a voyage from London to Bombay, India. She was refloated and resumed her voyage.
Margaret Jane	United Kingdom	The ship was driven ashore at Omeath, County Louth.
Maria	Germany	The steamship was driven ashore at Snekkersten, Denmark. She was on a voyage from Wolgast to Leith, Lothian, United Kingdom. She was later refloated and towed in to Copenhagen, Denmark for repairs.
Minnie Knapp	United Kingdom	The ship ran aground on Brigg's Reef, in the Belfast Lough.
Montreal	Denmark	The steamship was damaged by fire at New Orleans.
Mount Stuart	United Kingdom	The ship was abandoned in the Atlantic Ocean before 10 February.
Miravelles	Spanish Navy	The gunboat sank in a cyclone in the Spanish East Indies with the loss of all hands. A total of 46 lives were lost amongst the 25 vessels lost in the cyclone.
Myrtle	United Kingdom	The ship ran aground on the Haisborough Sands, in the North Sea off the coast of Norfolk. She was refloated and taken in to Great Yarmouth, Norfolk.
Nestorian	United Kingdom	The brig was driven ashore at Lowestoft, Suffolk. She was refloated and taken in to Lowestoft.
Ocean	United Kingdom	The barque was abandoned in the Atlantic Ocean before 28 February. She was on a voyage from Pensacola, Florida, United States to Belfast, County Antrim.
Oliver	United Kingdom	The barque was abandoned in the Atlantic Ocean. Her crew were rescued by the brigantine Belle Star (United Kingdom).
Patriot	United Kingdom	The steamship ran aground in the Øresund. She was on a voyage from Malmö, Sweden to Newcastle upon Tyne, Northumberland.
Portlaw	United Kingdom	The full-rigged ship ran aground at Campbeltown, Argyllshire. She was refloated on 18 February.
Princess Alice	United Kingdom	The steamship was driven ashore in Broad Bay, Isle of Lewis, Outer Hebrides. She was on a voyage from Aberdeen to Liverpool. She was refloated and taken in to Stornoway, Isle of Lewis.
Quango	United Kingdom	The brig was driven ashore near the Delaware Breakwater, United States. Her crew were rescued. She was refloated and taken in to a port for repairs.
Royal Charley	United Kingdom	The ship ran aground on the Ridge Sand. She was refloated.
Royalist	United Kingdom	The ship was wrecked at Bilbao, Spain. Her crew survived.
Shah Jehan	India	The steamship ran aground at Rajapur before 14 February. She was on a voyage from Calcutta to Bombay. She was refloated and resumed her voyage.
Shannon	United Kingdom	The barque was wrecked on the Goodwin Sands, Kent. Four of her crew were rescued by the Walmer Lifeboat, the rest reached shore in their boat. She was on a voyage from South Shields, County Durham to Livorno, Italy.
State of Pennsylvania	United Kingdom	The steamship ran aground in the Clyde at Port Glasgow, Renfrewshire.
State of Nevada	United Kingdom	The steamship was driven ashore at Sandy Hook, New Jersey, United States. She was later refloated and taken in to New York.
Tarlair	United Kingdom	The schooner was driven ashore and wrecked near Newburgh, Fife.
Tiger	United Kingdom	The ship was driven ashore on the Isle of Wight. She was on a voyage from Southampton, Hampshire to Stockton-on-Tees, County Durham. She was refloated and resumed her voyage.
Tubal Cain	United States	The brigantine was wrecked on Saint Thomas, Virgin Islands.
Undine	(United Kingdom of Great Britain and Ireland) Jersey	The schooner departed for A Coruña, Spain. No further trace, presumed foundered with the loss of all hands.
Utopia	United Kingdom	The steamship ran aground in the River Thames upstream of Dagenham, Essex. She was later refloated.
Valk Hazelhoff	Netherlands	The ship was abandoned off the coast of Spain before 6 February. Her crew were rescued. She was on a voyage from Havre de Grâce to Porto, Portugal.
Visgorla	India	The steamship foundered with the loss of 64 lives near Bombay whilst bound for Kurrachee.
Windau	Russia	The steamship ran aground at "Hannibal". She was on a voyage from Newcastle upon Tyne to Wismar, Germany. She was refloated.
Unnamed	Flag unknown	A ship was wrecked at Sidmouth, Devon with the loss of all hands.
Unnamed fishing boats	Spain	Many Spanish fishing boats and their crews were lost in hurricane-force winds.
Unnamed vessels	Flags unknown	The presence of large icebergs in the South Atlantic Ocean to the east of the Falkland Islands may account for many ships that vanished in the area during February.
21 unnamed vessels	Flags unknown	The ships were driven ashore and wrecked in a cyclone in the Spanish East Indies.
Three unnamed vessels	Spanish Navy	The warships were wrecked in a cyclone in the Spanish East Indies.
