= Ian Maclaren Thompson =

Canadian anatomist (1896–1981)

Prof Ian Maclaren Thompson FRSE FRSC (1896–1981) was a Newfoundland anatomist and medical author.

He was founder and first President of the Canadian Association of Anatomists in 1957 and also President of the Manitoba Museum.

== Life ==
He was born at Harbour Grace on 13 September 1896, the son of W. H. Thompson a pharmacist.

He travelled to Scotland to study Medicine at Edinburgh University around 1913 but his studies were interrupted by the First World War during which he was wounded and Mentioned in Dispatches. He graduated BSc then MB ChB as a physician in 1920.

He returned to Canada to teach. He lectured in anatomy at McGill University from 1920 to 1927 then moved to California to lecture at the University of California, Berkeley 1927 to 1936. He then returned to Canada as Professor of Anatomy (and head of department) from 1937 until retiral in 1965.

In 1952 he was elected a Fellow of the Royal Society of Edinburgh. His proposers were James Couper Brash, Alexander Gibson, Francis Albert Eley Crew and John Kenneth.

He died in Winnipeg on Boxing Day, 26 December 1981. He is buried there in Brookside Cemetery.

== Publications ==
- On the Comparative Anatomy of the Fifth Nerve (1925)
- Elements of Surface Anatomy (1925)
- A Method of Outlining Cutaneous Nerve Areas (1933)
- On the Arteries and Ducts of the Hepatic Pedicle (1933)
- Sensory Masking (1935)
