= George Weber =

George Weber may refer to:

- George Weber (radio personality) (1961–2009), American radio personality
- George D. Weber (1925–2012), American politician from Missouri
- George Heinrich Weber (1752–1828), German botanist

== See also ==
- Georg Weber
- George Webber (disambiguation)
