= Harbour Grace Airport =

- IATA: none; ICAO: none; TC LID: CHG2

Summary
- Airport type: Public
- Operator: Town of Harbour Grace
- Location: Harbour Grace, Newfoundland and Labrador
- Time zone: NST (UTC−03:30)
  - Summer (DST): NDT (UTC−02:30)
- Elevation AMSL: 325 ft / 99 m
- Coordinates: 47°41′08″N 053°15′14″W

Map
- Location in Newfoundland and Labrador

Runways
Direction	Length		Surface
Direction	ft	m	Surface
09/27	2,000	610	Turf
- Sources: Canada Flight Supplement

Harbour Grace Airport (TC LID: CHG2) is 0.8 nautical miles (1.5 km; 0.92 mi) west of Harbour Grace, Newfoundland and Labrador, Canada.

== History ==
On 20 May 1932 Amelia Earhart set off from Harbour Grace and, after a flight lasting 14 hours 56 minutes, landed in a pasture at Culmore, north of Derry, Northern Ireland to become the first woman to fly solo across the Atlantic Ocean.

Over the previous five years, most transatlantic flights had included a stop at Harbour Grace. Wiley Post, who with Harold Gatty as navigator made the first circumnavigation of the globe by airplane (eight days) in 1931, wrote:

The crazy flyers who leave there for Europe are, to those people, definite forerunners of a transportation system to England that will place Harbor Grace on the map. The movement to develop the airport has been aided by ... the entire east coast of the island settlement ... the people there believe with utmost faith that aviation is to be the salvation of a dying community. Not so many years ago Conception Bay was continually filled with a hundred or more ships. Whalers, ore boats, and fishing schooners did a lot of business in Harbor Grace in bygone days, but now the blue bay is dotted only by a scant sail or two, and the people are in hard straits.

I would like to have heard more, but time was pressing on and we had a long way to go.

These transatlantic flights through Harbour Grace are designated as a Canadian National Historic Event.

The airstrip was abandoned after World War II, but was officially re-opened in 1999 following its restoration by the Harbour Grace Historical Society.
