= The Harbour Grace Affray =

Religious conflict in Harbour Grace, Newfoundland Colony

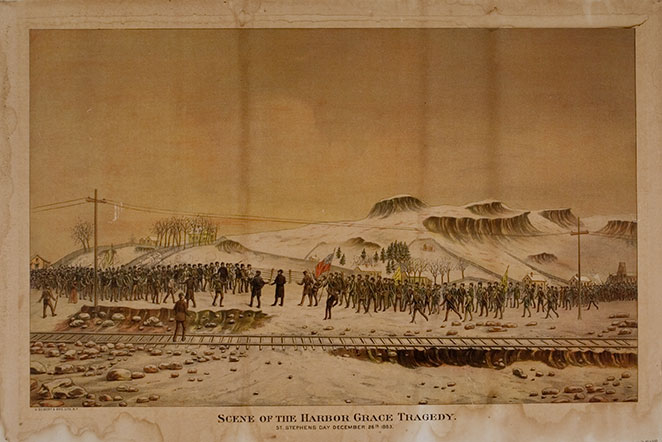
- Lithograph depicting the Affray
Date	26 December, 1883
Location	Harbour Grace, Colony of Newfoundland
Result	No decisive victory; 19 men brought to trial

Belligerents
Roman Catholics	Orangemen Newfoundland Constabulary

Strength
100 - 150	400 - 500

Casualties and losses
1 dead; 19 arrested for murder	3 dead; 3 arrested for murder; 3 arrested
- Civilian casualties: 1 dead

The Harbour Grace Affray was an armed conflict of religious violence that happened on Saint Stephen's Day, 1883 in the town of Harbour Grace, Colony of Newfoundland, between members of the Loyal Orange Association and the Roman Catholics.

== History ==
In 1883, the Loyal Orange Association in Harbour Grace decided to postpone the events of their commemoration of Protestant victory over the Catholics at the Battle of the Boyne, from 12 July to Saint Stephen's Day (December 26). This was due to the fact that most men were engaged in the ground fishery or seal fishery in July.

On Saint Stephen's Day, 400 to 500 Protestants marched down Harvey Street of Harbour Grace in celebration. The leader was said to be holding a King James Version of the bible while they marched.

The parade began advancing into what the Catholic's considered their territory. As a result, 100 to 150 Catholics from Riverhead, Harbour Grace, gathered to block the advancing parade. The Catholics were armed with guns and there were unarmed protestant constables monitoring the parade. A riot broke out between the two sides. There was a lot of shouting, which was soon followed by gunfire; gunfire erupted all around. Before the fight, Head Constable, Edward Doyle was seen in the middle, talking to both groups.

Const. Doyle, an Ulster Protestant, was accused of pulling a gun and killing Patrick Callahan, a Catholic. Callahan died from a gunshot to the head. Three Protestants, William French, William Janes, and Thomas Nicholas, and one civilian, John Bray, were also killed during the conflict. 17 other men were also injured during the conflict.

19 men were charged for the murders and the trials occurred in February 1884 and lasted 47 day; however, all 19 men were acquitted due to conflicting evidence and suspected perjury. This infuriated the Protestants and a second trial was ordered in November 1884. During the trial, Protestants made it known for their intention to parade on the anniversary of the affray. As a result, Governor John Hawley Glover had the HMS Tenedos anchored in Harbour Grace and an additional 50 police constables stationed to keep law and order.

The events of the affray and subsequent trials lead to the fall of Newfoundland Premier, Sir William Whiteway's Government in 1885.

== In popular culture ==
In 2011, author, Patrick Collins, of Harbour Grace, published a semi-fictional novel about the event, titled The Harbour Grace Affray.

== See also ==
- List of incidents of civil unrest in Canada
