= George William Wallace Webber =

New Zealand postmaster, boarding-house keeper and farmer

- Born: 15 August 1875; Nelson, New Zealand
- Died: 12 June 1967 (aged 92)
- Occupation: Postmaster
- Parents: Wallace Thomas Webber (father); Maria Elizabeth Wells (mother)

George William Wallace Webber (1875–1967) was a notable New Zealand postmaster, boarding-house keeper and farmer. He was born in Nelson, New Zealand in 1875.

== Biography ==
The first child of Maria Elizabeth Wells and her husband Wallace Thomas Webber, a sheep farmer from Elmslies Bay, French Pass, in the Marlborough Sounds, George William Wallace Webber was born on August 15, 1875, in Nelson, New Zealand. Since 1877, his father had an agreement with the post office to pick up mail from Union Steam Ship Company of New Zealand vessels, which was challenging work given the usually hazardous conditions of the pass. A series of governesses educated George at home, at Nelson, and at a nearby household school. He was among the first people to witness Pelorus Jack, a dolphin that was an Admiralty Bay tourist attraction for 24 years while returning home from school in 1888.

George frequently had to push the creature away with an oar to keep his dinghy from tipping over while collecting mailbags. The German government sent Dr. Hugo Schauinsland, director of the Übersee Museum in Bremen, to the Pacific in 1896 to gather specimens. He arrived in French Pass. He and his wife stayed with the Webber family because he was particularly interested in the tuatara of Stephens Island, a reptile with ancient origins. George started working for him and eventually traveled to the Chatham Islands with the Schauinslands. He started assembling, dissecting, conserving, and shipping specimens to Germany, sometimes while they were still alive.

He once struggled greatly to get three non-poisonous tree snakes from the Pacific islands back inside when he opened a package, and they coiled up his arm. His father had retired when George married Ethel Amy Crump, a music instructor, in Nelson on December 31, 1900. George took over the property and was appointed interim postmaster before succeeding him as postmaster in 1907. Ethel's family originally opposed the union out of concern that she could not handle the loneliness and demanding work at the pass, but she persisted. The couple were to have 8 children.

Other foreign guests also visited the Webbers' home. Captain John Claus Voss, who was sailing the world on the Canadian canoe Tilikum in 1903, was entertained by George and Ethel. While wintering in New Zealand in 1912, crew members from Captain R. F. Scott's support ship Terra Nova arrived in French Pass to conduct a marine survey of Admiralty Bay. The support team learned that Scott and his group of explorers had died on their way back from the South Pole when they arrived in Antarctica. George was given a copy of the expedition's chart of Admiralty Bay many years later, which he loved.

When the first telephone lines were set out in 1910, there were still no public facilities at the harbor, and the post office was a piece of Webber's storehouse that had been partitioned off. As each of his five daughters finished their education, they took turns working there after a money-order office and post office savings bank were constructed in 1918. George and Ethel maintained a boarding house in the 1930s when wool and stock prices fell. In 1935, the French Pass Road Board was founded, and George was elected to serve as its chairman.

George Webber wrote on the European habitation of French Pass in his final years. The book details the happenings and daily lives of those who lived in this remote outpost, which for many years served as a crucial crossing place for ships traveling between Wellington and Nelson. After retiring from his profession as postmaster in 1944, he and his wife moved to Putaruru in 1950 to live with their daughter. George relocated to Stratford to live with a son after Ethel died there in 1956. He died there on June 12, 1967, at the age of 92. He was survived by four daughters and three sons. A vibrant and vivacious individual, he served as the French Pass postmaster for 44 years, giving the locals an essential connection to the outside world.
