= George Webber (poet) =

Newfoundlander poet

- Born: c. 1820; Harbour Grace, Newfoundland
- Died: Unknown
- Occupations: Poet, newspaperman

George Webber was a Newfoundlander poet. Born in Newfoundland, he wrote several poems that saw circulation in British Canada. He later opened a newspaper in Harbour Grace.

== Biography ==
Webber was born in the Newfoundland (then a British dominion) in the early 19th century. Sources do not relate his birth date or year, but the Dictionary of Canadian Biography speculates he was born in Harbour Grace in the 1820s. Following his education, Webber traveled throughout Newfoundland and Canada before settling down.

By 1851 Webber had become affiliated with several local newspapers in St. John's. His first poem, "Seal song" was published in a local paper to commemorate the start of the 1851 sealing season, and was well received. Webber also published another poem, "The last of the aborigines", commemorating the decline of the Beothuk people of Newfoundland. The poem portrayed the Beothuks in a heroic light, while it portrayed the white colonizers of Newfoundland as unsavory. This second poem was more controversial, but saw some circulation in Newfoundland.

In 1856 Webber opened his own newspaper, the Conception-Bay Man. The paper continued until 1859, but Webber's name drops from the historical record after 1857.
