= Harbour Grace =

Town in Newfoundland and Labrador, Canada

- Town
- Town of Harbour Grace
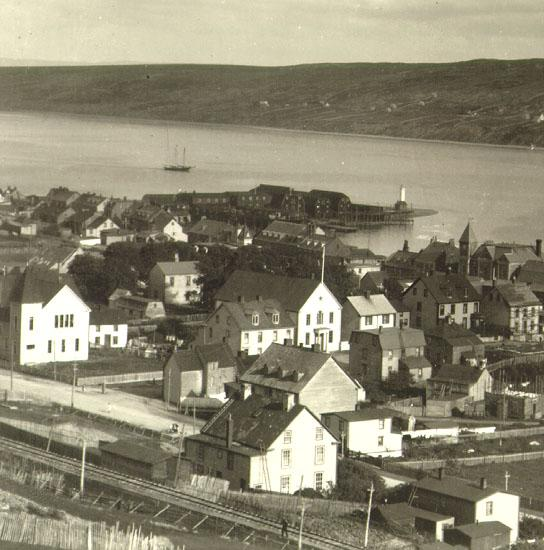
- Harbour Grace water front c. 1911

- Seal

- Location of Harbour Grace in Newfoundland
- Coordinates: 47°41′30″N 53°13′00″W
- Country: Canada
- Province: Newfoundland and Labrador
- Settled: 1583
- Incorporated: July 10, 1945

Government
  - Type: Town Council
  - Mayor: Terry Barnes
  - MP: Paul Connors

Area
  - Total: 33.71 km^{2} (13.02 sq mi)
- Elevation: 16 m (52 ft)

Population (2021)
  - Total: 2,796
  - Density: 88.8/km^{2} (230/sq mi)
- Time zone: UTC-3:30 (Newfoundland Time)
  - Summer (DST): UTC-2:30 (Newfoundland Daylight)
- Postal code span: A0A
- Area code: 709
- Highways: Route 70; Route 75
- Website: Town of Harbour Grace

Harbour Grace is a town in Conception Bay on the Avalon Peninsula in the province of Newfoundland and Labrador, Canada. With roots dating back to the 16th century, it is one of the oldest towns in North America.

It is located about 90 kilometres (56 mi) northwest of the provincial capital, St. John's. The town has a population of 2,796 (2021), engaged primarily in fishing and fish processing. The alternative spelling of Harbor Grace was current at one time.

== History ==
=== Early history ===
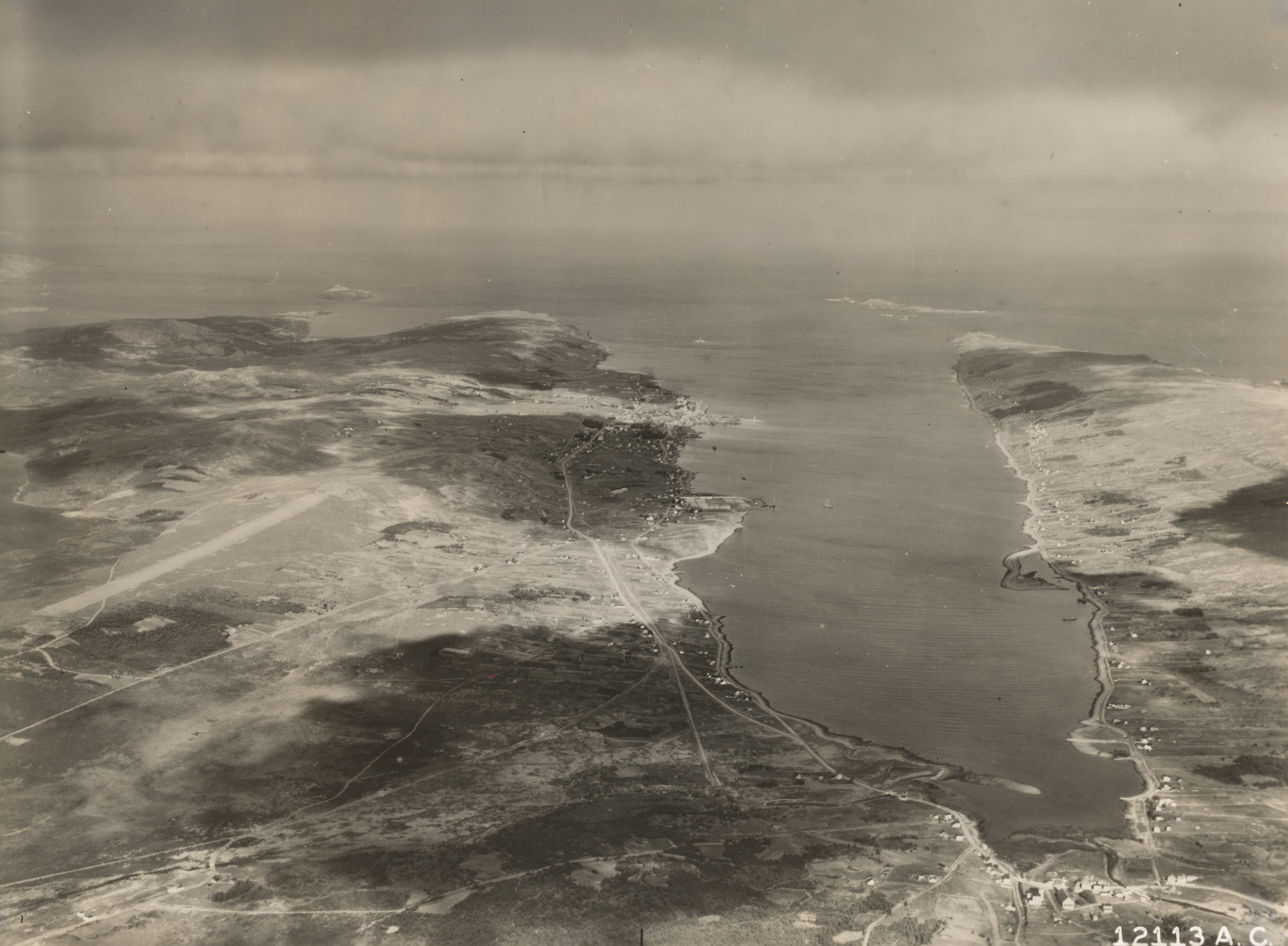
Harbour Grace 1940

The town was seasonally operated by fishermen from the Bailiwick of Jersey and was named after the French city of Havre de Grâce, which is now known as Le Havre. Harbour Grace was an important port and fishing centre from the earliest days of English exploration of North America. The town was a thriving seasonal fishing community by 1550. In 1583, Robert Tossey of Dartmouth, England, become the first year-round resident.

In 1610, Peter Easton, an English buccaneer, made Harbour Grace his headquarters, and built a fort overlooking the bay. Although it was attacked by the French the following year, the early English settlement survived throughout the 17th century, with a permanent, year-round population numbering a few dozen, swelling to several hundred during the fishing season.

Around the year 1618, Harbour Grace became an official settlement. In that year 1618, the Bristol Society of Merchant Venturers received a Royal Charter from King James I to establish a settlement near Harbour Grace, “Bristol's Hope". Robert Hayman was appointed as its first Proprietary Governor, a post he held for the next ten years. Hayman returned to London in 1628, where he published a work of pithy epigrams called Quodlibets, written during his tenure as colonial governor.

Over the coming years, control of Harbour Grace became a point of contention between the English and the French. The town, with a population numbering about 100, was razed by the French in 1697, again in 1700, and captured briefly in 1762. Nevertheless, between these attacks, the population grew by 50%. By 1771, the population was close to 5,800. By then, however, other colonial towns along the Atlantic coast had surpassed Harbour Grace in population and influence.

=== Harbour Grace Railway Station Registered Heritage Structure ===
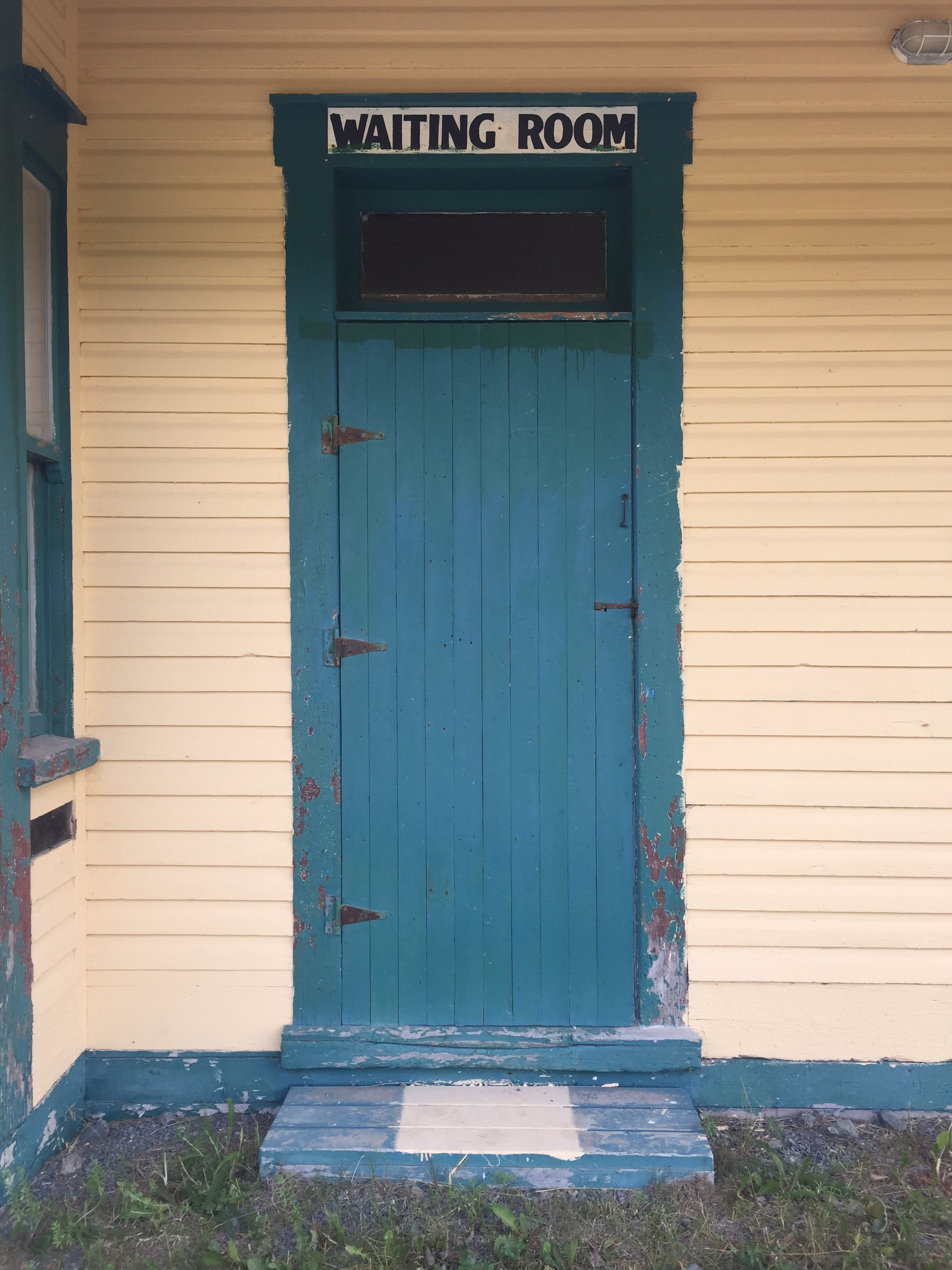
Waiting Room door, Harbour Grace Railway Station

The Gordon G. Pike Railway Heritage Museum and Park (c. 1881–1884) was designated a Municipal Heritage Building in 2006. The first railway line in Newfoundland was completed to Harbour Grace in 1884.

=== Other historic sites ===
The Harbour Grace Court House, constructed in 1830, is the oldest surviving public building in the province and a National Historic Site of Canada. St. Paul's Anglican Church in Harbour Grace was built in 1835, making it the oldest stone church in Newfoundland and Labrador. Built around 1867, the Masonic building of Lodge Harbour Grace No. 476 A.F. & A.M. S.C., is the oldest wooden Masonic meeting house in Canada. The 1870 customs house is now the Conception Bay Museum

Ridley Offices is a stone building, built in 1838. It was home to businessman Thomas Ridley, a controversial but well-known merchant. Rhonda Parsons acquired the home in 2005.

== Aviation history ==
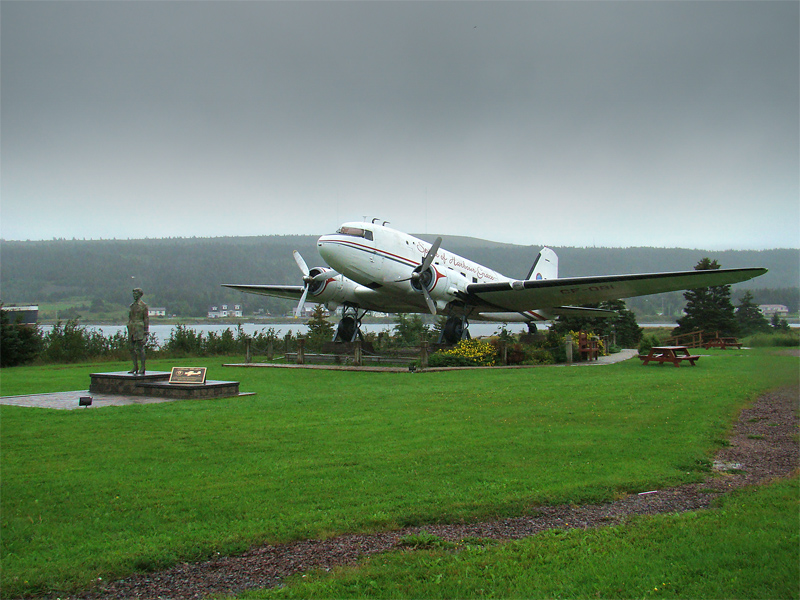
The Spirit of Harbour Grace and monument to Amelia Earhart

As trans-Atlantic aviation became more popular in the 1920s and 1930s, many aviation pioneers, among them Amelia Earhart and Thor Solberg chose to make their crossing from the nearby Harbour Grace airfield due to its proximity to continental Europe. Altogether, some twenty flights left Harbour Grace from 1919 to 1936 in their attempts to cross the Atlantic.

The first flight by a Canadian from North America to England embarked October 9, 1930, in the plane Maple Leaf (aka Columbia), piloted by Capt. J. Erroll Boyd (1891–1960) and was navigated by the American, Lieut. Harry Connor. This flight was also notable for transporting mail bearing a surcharged stamp as a commemorative overprint. The aviators borrowed a Webley & Scott flare pistol to carry during the flight from Edward Langdon Oke, a former Sergeant with the Royal Newfoundland Regiment in World War I. The aviators had the gun engraved to mark the historic flight and it resides in the collection at the Conception Bay Museum. Amelia Earhart took flight from Harbour Grace on May 20, 1932, to become the first woman to fly solo across the Atlantic. The early transatlantic flights from the Harbour Grace airfield were designated Events of National Historic Significance.

In July 1941, the Royal Canadian Navy established a High Frequency Direction Finding wireless station on the airfield. Consisting of an Operations Building and a Direction Finding shack, the station had an uninterrupted sweep of the northern Atlantic sector and was able to provide bearings on U-boat transmissions and to intercept enemy radio traffic.

Harbour Grace was one of the first sites that the Royal Canadian Navy was solely responsible for after war broke out. On May 21, 1945, the Canadian Naval Service approved closing down and disposing of its facility at Harbour Grace. There is no evidence of the station today. Following WWII, the airstrip was left to deteriorate. In 1977, through the efforts of the Harbour Grace Historical Society, it was restored to a usable condition. In 1999, after years of being considered abandoned, the airstrip was reinstated to official international airdrome status under the designator of CHG2.

== Demographics ==
The town peaked in population in 1921, when the census was taken at 11,458 residents.

In the 2021 Census of Population conducted by Statistics Canada, Harbour Grace had a population of 2,796 living in 1,307 of its 1,483 total private dwellings, a change of −6.6% from its 2016 population of 2,995. With a land area of 33.71 km^{2} (13.02 sq mi), it had a population density of 82.9/km^{2} (214.8/sq mi) in 2021.

Population trend
Census	Population	Change
2021	2,796	▼-6.6
2016	2,995	▼-4.3
2011	3,131	▲1.9
2006	3,074	▼-9.1%
2001	3,380	▼-9.6%
1996	3,740	NA

Knowledge of official languages (2016)
Language	Percent
English only	97.8%
French only	0%
Both English and French	2.2%

Religion	2001
Protestant	61.4%
Roman Catholic	38.3%
No religion	0.3%
Other religions	0%

Race/ethnic groups (2006)
Group	Percent
White	99.3%
Visible Minority	0.7%

== History briefs ==
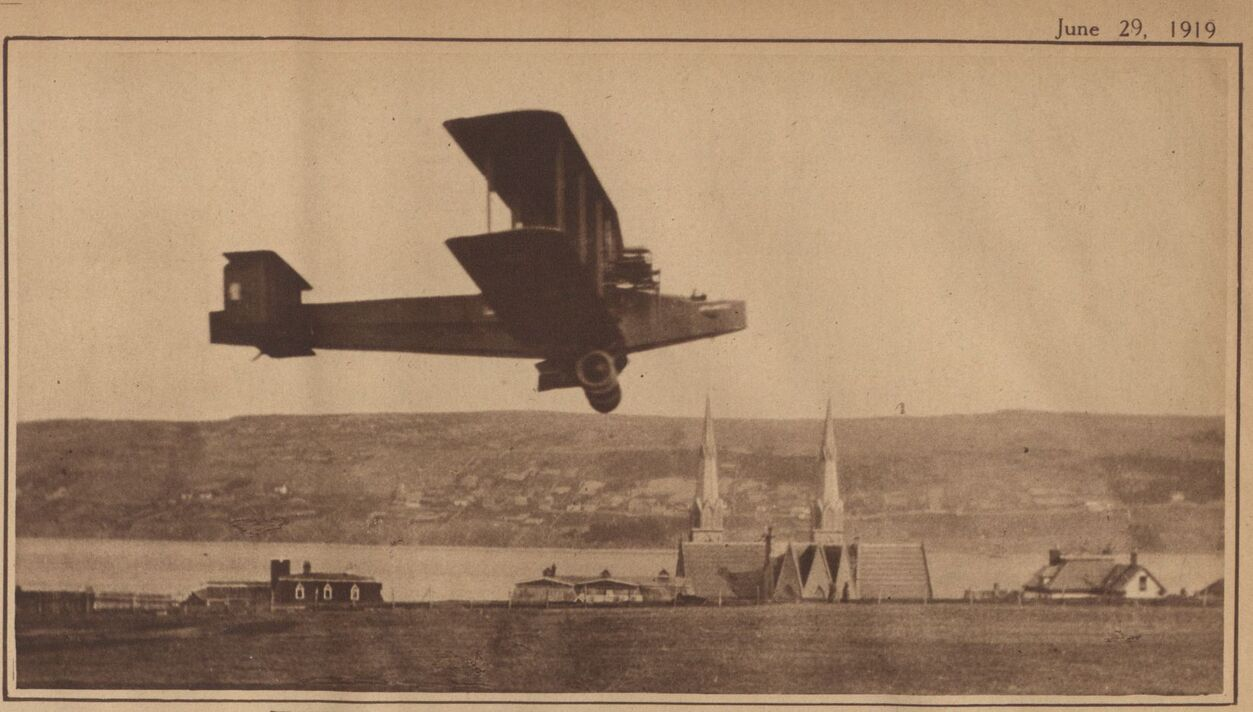
Handley Page flyer preparing to cross the Atlantic in Harbor Grace, Newfoundland, 1919

- The first English account of the capture of St. John's by the French came from Harbour Grace Island in 1708.
- Laurence Coughlan, credited as the founder of Methodism in Newfoundland, laid the foundations of Newfoundland's first Methodist movement when he served as an Anglican priest in Harbour Grace from 1766 to 1773.
- The Harbour Grace Regatta, held annually since 1862, is the second-oldest continuing sporting event in North America.
- The Harbour Grace Affray takes place on Saint Stephen's Day, 1883.
- The hand-operated, iron "Washington" press, manufactured by R. Hoe & Company, was used in Harbour Grace for more than a century—1850 to 1962. The press was purchased from Munn & Oke, Ltd by Memorial University, now named "Pitcher Plant Press", and is on display in the Queen Elizabeth II Library (Memorial University, St. John's, Newfoundland and Labrador).

== Notable residents ==
- Daniel Cleary (born 1978) is a former NHL winger, notably for the Detroit Red Wings. In 2008, he became the first player from Newfoundland and Labrador to win the Stanley Cup. Danny Cleary Arena is named in his honour.
- George Webber (born 1820) was a newspaperman and poet.
- Robert John Parsons (1802–1883) was a journalist and politician in Harbour Grace. He was the owner of the Newfoundland Patriot newspaper.
- William Austin Oke (1857–1923) was a newspaper publisher, politician, and District Court judge. He represented Harbour Grace in the Newfoundland House of Assembly for three terms, from 1898 to 1908, as a Liberal.
- Prof Ian Maclaren Thompson FRSC FRSE (1896–1981), anatomist. Founder and first President of the Canadian Association of Anatomists and President of the Manitoba Museum.
- Robert Oke (1794–1870) was the first Chief Inspector for the Newfoundland Lighthouse Service and served from 1855 to 1870. He published several books, including two books of early Newfoundland lighthouse designs in 1860 and 1861, with a revised edition of the latter in 1865. Oke installed the first light mechanism (from Bell Rock Lighthouse) at the Cape Bonavista Light in 1842, and installed the famous Isle of May light mechanism at the Cape Pine Light in 1850, which was later moved to Harbour Grace Island and finally to Cape Bonavista, where it can be viewed today.

== See also ==
- Laneways of Harbour Grace Wikiversity project
- List of cities and towns in Newfoundland and Labrador
- Newfoundland Railway
