= Kennetpans distillery =

Coordinates: 56°4′51.52″N 3°44′50.28″W

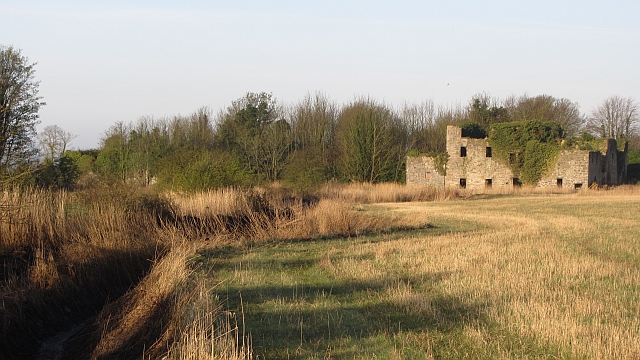
Ruin, Kennet Pans (geograph 3106273)

Kennetpans Distillery is a former Scotch whisky distillery which was situated to the south of Clackmannan and Kennet, on the north of the River Forth.

Once the biggest distillery in Scotland, Kennetpans made whisky in the early eighteenth century.

Tax paid on the produce was greater than all of Scotland's land tax. This wealth led to the building of the first railway line in Scotland and one of the first canals. The owners, the Stein family, have been described as being "at the forefront of the Industrial Revolution in Scotland."

The distillery has connections to Haig and Jameson names in alcohol production.

A newly developed Boulton and Watt condensing steam engine was installed, the first in Scotland, at a time when spirits produced were being exported in great quantities to the English gin market.

Ceasing operations in 1825, the site is being noted in 1996 as "ruinous" and overgrown. At one time the buildings were three stories high. The site also had its own pier, remains of which can be seen at low tide.

The site was designated as a scheduled monument in 1991.
