= Newfoundland and Labrador Route 80 =

Highway in Newfoundland and Labrador

Route 80
- Trinity Road

Route information
- Maintained by Newfoundland and Labrador Department of Transportation and Infrastructure
- Length: 105 km (65 mi)

Major junctions
- South end: Route 1 (TCH) / Route 81 in Whitbourne
- Route 73 in New Harbour; Route 74 in Heart's Content; Route 70 in Old Perlican
- North end: Marine Drive / Main Street in Old Perlican

Location
- Country: Canada
- Province: Newfoundland and Labrador

Highway system
- Highways in Newfoundland and Labrador
← Route 75	→ Route 81

Route 80, also known as Trinity Road, is a 105-kilometre-long (65 mi) north–south highway along the Avalon Peninsula of Newfoundland. It connects the communities along the eastern side of Trinity Bay with the Trans Canada Highway (TCH).

== Route description ==
Route 80 begins at an interchange between Route 1 (TCH) and Route 81 (Markland Road, exit 28 on Route 1) at the northern edge of Whitbourne. It heads north to pass through Blaketown and along the shores of Dildo Pond before following the coastline to pass through South Dildo, where it has an intersection with a local road leading to Old Shop, and Dildo. The highway turns more inland as it passes through New Harbour to an intersection with Route 73 (New Harbour Road) before passing through Hopeall and Green's Harbour. Route 80 passes along the coast again as heads north through Whiteway, Cavendish, Heart's Delight-Islington, Heart's Desire, and Heart's Content, where it intersects Route 74 (Heart's Content Highway).

The highway now winds its way through New Perilcan, Turks Cove, Winterton, Hant's Harbour, and New Chelsea-New Melbourne-Brownsdale-Sibley's Cove-Lead Cove before arriving in Old Perlican at an intersection with Route 70 (Conception Bay Highway). Route 80 turns north through town along Blow Me Down Road for a short distance before ending at an intersection with Marine Drive and Main Street. Marine Drive continues north to the Harbour while Main Street continues on to Daniel's Cove and Grates Cove.

As with most highways on the island, the entire length of Route 80 is a two-lane highway.

== Major intersections ==
Location	km	mi	Destinations	Notes
Whitbourne	0.0	0.0	Route 1 (TCH) – Clarenville, St. John's; Route 81 south (Main Road) – Downtown, Colinet	Exit 28 on Route 1; southern terminus; northern terminus of Route 81
South Dildo	8.3	5.2	Old Shop Road (Route 80-10-1) - Old Shop	
New Harbour	18.4	11.4	Route 73 east (New Harbour Road) – Tilton, Bay Roberts	Western terminus of Route 73
Heart's Content	59.0	36.7	Route 74 east (Heart's Content Highway) – Victoria	
Old Perlican	104	65	Route 70 (Conception Bay Highway/Trinity Road) – Bay de Verde, Carbonear	Route 80 becomes Blow Me Down Road; Trinity Road follows Route 70 north
Old Perlican	105	65	Marine Drive - Harbour; Main Street to Daniel's Cove Road - Daniel's Cove, Grates Cove	Northern terminus
1.000 mi = 1.609 km; 1.000 km = 0.621 mi: Route transition

== See also ==
- List of highways numbered 80
