= Old Shop, Newfoundland and Labrador =

Local service district in Canada

Coordinates: 47°32′00″N 53°35′00″W

Location of Old Shop in Newfoundland and Labrador

Old Shop is a local service district and designated place in the Canadian province of Newfoundland and Labrador. It is on the western side of the Dildo Arm, at the southern end of Trinity Bay. It is northwest of South Dildo, across the Dildo Arm from Dildo proper.

== History ==
Old Shop was first used as a centre for cutting ships' timber and was simply called "The Old Chop" by those that worked there. Local tradition states the name comes from mistranslation of "Old Chop" and happened when the town was first settled for permanent living.

== Geography ==
Old Shop is in Newfoundland within Subdivision Y of Division No. 1.

== Demographics ==
As a designated place in the 2016 Census of Population conducted by Statistics Canada, Old Shop recorded a population of 209 living in 90 of its 161 total private dwellings, a change of -5% from its 2011 population of 220. With a land area of 2.87 km^{2} (1.11 sq mi), it had a population density of 72.8/km^{2} (188.6/sq mi) in 2016.

== Government ==
Old Shop is a local service district (LSD) that is governed by a committee responsible for the provision of certain services to the community. The chair of the LSD committee is Jeffrey Garland.

== See also ==
- List of communities in Newfoundland and Labrador
- List of designated places in Newfoundland and Labrador
- List of local service districts in Newfoundland and Labrador
