= Hopeall =

- Local service district / designated place
- Location of Hopeall Hopeall (Canada)
- Coordinates: 47.606°N 53.516°W
- Country: Canada
- Province: Newfoundland and Labrador
- Region: Newfoundland
- Census division: 1
- Census subdivision: E

Government
  - Type: Unincorporated

Area
  - Land: 5.58 km^{2} (2.15 sq mi)

Population (2016)
  - Total: 242
- Time zone: UTC−03:30 (NST)
  - Summer (DST): UTC−02:30 (NDT)
- Area code: 709

Hopeall is a local service district and designated place in the Canadian province of Newfoundland and Labrador.

== Geography ==
Hopeall is in Newfoundland within Subdivision E of Division No. 1. It lies at the south eastern end of Hopeall Bay, an arm of Trinity Bay.

== Demographics ==
As a designated place in the 2016 Census of Population conducted by Statistics Canada, Hopeall recorded a population of 242 living in 100 of its 126 total private dwellings, a change of −30.7% from its 2011 population of 349. With a land area of 5.58 km^{2} (2.15 sq mi), it had a population density of 43.4/km^{2} (112.3/sq mi) in 2016.

== Government ==
Hopeall is a local service district (LSD) that is governed by a committee responsible for the provision of certain services to the community. The chair of the LSD committee is Anthony Cumby.

== See also ==
- List of communities in Newfoundland and Labrador
- List of designated places in Newfoundland and Labrador
- List of local service districts in Newfoundland and Labrador
