= List of shipwrecks in April 1843 =

The list of shipwrecks in April 1843 includes ships sunk, foundered, wrecked, grounded, or otherwise lost during April 1843.

== 1 April ==
List of shipwrecks: 1 April 1843
Ship	State	Description
Hibernia	United Kingdom	The ship collided with Thracian (United States) and foundered off Point Lynas, Anglesey. Her crew were rescued. She was on a voyage from Dundalk, County Louth, to Preston, Lancashire.
James Lock	United Kingdom	The ship was abandoned in the Atlantic Ocean. Her crew were rescued by Brilliant (United Kingdom). She was on a voyage from Swansea, Glamorgan, to Madeira.
Libra	Hamburg	The ship was driven ashore in Rhossili Bay. Her crew were rescued.
Mohawk	United Kingdom	The barque was in collision with the brig William (United Kingdom) and was severely damaged off Hartlepool, County Durham. She put into Hartlepool in a sinking condition. She was on a voyage from South Shields, County Durham, to Buenos Aires, Argentina.
Sarah	United Kingdom	The ship was abandoned in the Bristol Channel. Her crew were rescued by Primrose (United Kingdom). Sarah was on a voyage from Bristol, Gloucestershire, to Plymouth, Devon.
Sarah	United Kingdom	The ship was in collision with Henry (United Kingdom and sank at Dublin. She was later refloated.

== 2 April ==
List of shipwrecks: 2 April 1843
Ship	State	Description
Abeona	United Kingdom	The barque was wrecked off Cape San Antonio, Cuba. Her crew were rescued. She was on a voyage from Newcastle upon Tyne, Northumberland, to New Orleans, Louisiana, United States.
Atlantic	United Kingdom	The ship was run ashore in Newark Bay, Sanday, Orkney Islands. Her crew were rescued. She was on a voyage from Hull, Yorkshire, to St. John's, Newfoundland.
Christopher Rawson	United Kingdom	The ship struck a reef in the South China Sea off "Pulo Sapata", Spanish East Indies and sank. Her crew were rescued. She was on a voyage from Macao to Singapore.
Lebru	Hamburg	The ship was driven ashore and wrecked at Llanmadock, Glamorgan, United Kingdom.
St. Bertrand	France	The ship was abandoned in the Atlantic Ocean. Her crew were rescued by Montezuma (United Kingdom). St, Bertrand was on a voyage from Fécamp, Seine-Inférieure, to Newfoundland, British North America.

== 3 April ==
List of shipwrecks: 3 April 1843
Ship	State	Description
Orient	United Kingdom	The ship was driven ashore and wrecked at Perranarworthal, Cornwall. She was on a voyage from Quebec City, Province of Canada, British North America, to London.
Pytho	France	The ship ran aground on the Dunkirk Banks. She was refloated and taken into Ostend, West Flanders, Belgium.

== 4 April ==
List of shipwrecks: 4 April 1843
Ship	State	Description
Acklam	United Kingdom	The ship was driven ashore near Gilleleje, Denmark. She was on a voyage from Stockton-on-Tees, County Durham, to Stettin. She was refloated and resumed her voyage.
Aylesford	United Kingdom	The ship was driven ashore near Gilleleje. She was on a voyage from Newcastle upon Tyne, Northumberland, to Stettin. She was refloated and resumed her voyage.
Chieftain	United Kingdom	The ship foundered in the English Channel. Her crew were rescued by the barque New England (United States).
China	United Kingdom	The ship was wrecked at Charleston, South Carolina, United States. She was on a voyage from Liverpool, Lancashire, to Charleston.
Lord Hawkesbury	United Kingdom	The ship sank in a squall off Portsmouth, Hampshire. Her crew were rescued. She was on a voyage from Falmouth, Cornwall, to Shoreham-by-Sea, Sussex.
Medora	United Kingdom	The ship was run down and sunk in the Boston Deeps by Sarah (United Kingdom). Her crew were rescued by Sarah. Medora was on a voyage from Hartlepool, County Durham, to Faversham, Kent.
Miracle	United Kingdom	The ship was driven ashore near Liverpool, Lancashire. She was on a voyage from Liverpool to Quebec City, Province of Canada, British North America. She was refloated the next day and put back to Liverpool.
Telegraph	United Kingdom	The schooner capsized in a squall off Portland, Dorset. All seventeen people on board survived.
Voluna	United Kingdom	The ship sank at the mouth of the River Usk.

== 5 April ==
List of shipwrecks: 5 April 1843
Ship	State	Description
Aurora	United Kingdom	The ship sprang a leak and was beached at Grimsby, Lincolnshire. She was refloated the next day and taken into Grimsby for repairs.
Edward	United Kingdom	The ship was driven against the pier and severely damaged at Whitby, Yorkshire.
Oithona	United Kingdom	The snow struck the Lafolle Reef, Haiti in heavy fog and became a wreck. She was on a voyage from Liverpool, Lancashire, to Port-au-Prince, Haiti.
Phœbe	United Kingdom	The ship ran aground on the Haisborough Sands, in the North Sea off the coast of Norfolk. Her crew were rescued.

== 6 April ==
List of shipwrecks: 6 April 1843
Ship	State	Description
Hibernia	United Kingdom	The ship was in collision with Jericen (United Kingdom) and sank in the English Channel. Her crew were rescued.
Lydia	United Kingdom	The ship was driven ashore in a capsized condition at Caernarfon.
Mary	United Kingdom	The ship ran aground on the Shipwash Sand, in the North Sea off the coast of Essex. She was refloated and taken into Harwich, Essex.
Orient	United Kingdom	The ship was wrecked on a rock near the Longships Lighthouse, Cornwall. Her crew were rescued.

== 7 April ==
List of shipwrecks: 7 April 1843
Ship	State	Description
Agnes	United Kingdom	The schooner was destroyed by fire in the North Sea (54°09′N 3°00′E). Her crew were rescued by the barque Sostre (Norway). Agnes was on a voyage from Havre de Grâce, Seine-Inférieure, France to Hamburg.
Athalon	United Kingdom	The brig was wrecked on the Île-à-Vache, Haiti. She was on a voyage from Liverpool, Lancashire, to Port-au-Prince, Haiti.
Charles and William	United Kingdom	The steam tug was stolen from the River Tyne. She was driven ashore and wrecked at Tynemouth, Northumberland, with the loss of one of the two people on board. The survivor was rescued by the North Shields Lifeboat.
Dale	United Kingdom	The barque foundered in the Atlantic Ocean off Lisbon, Portugal. Her eighteen crew were rescued by the schooner Porto Novo (Portugal).
Flora	United Kingdom	The ship was wrecked near Castletown, Isle of Man.
Henrick	Denmark	The ship was wrecked near "Melazzo".
Marquis of Breadalbane	United Kingdom	The ship ran aground on the Shipwash Sand, in the North Sea off the coast of Essex. She was on a voyage from Perth to London. She was refloated and taken into Harwich, Essex, in a leaky condition.
Mary Dixon	United Kingdom	The ship ran aground on the Shipwash Sand. She was on a voyage from Newcastle upon Tyne, Northumberland, to Rouen, Seine-Inférieure.
New Margaretha	United Kingdom	The ship was wrecked at Atherstone, Isle of Wight. Her crew were rescued. She was on a voyage from Caernarfon to Portsmouth, Hampshire.
Pomona	Norway	The ship was abandoned off the Pentland Firth. She came ashore on Burray, Orkney Islands, United Kingdom, and was wrecked.
Queen Victoria	United Kingdom	The East Indiaman was wrecked on a reef off the south west of Rodrigues, Mauritius with the loss of eleven lives. She was on a voyage from Bombay, India, to Liverpool, Lancashire.
Salamanca	United Kingdom	The ship was driven ashore and wrecked 4 nautical miles (7.4 km) from Rye, Sussex. Her crew were rescued by the Coast Guard. She was on a voyage from Truro, Cornwall, to Newcastle upon Tyne, Northumberland.
San Sparidone	Greece	The ship ran aground on the Kentish Knock and was abandoned by her crew. They were rescued by a French fishing vessel. She was on a voyage from Newcastle upon Tyne to Constantinople, Ottoman Empire.
Solway	United Kingdom	The paddle steamer was wrecked on the Baldargo Reef, 20 nautical miles (37 km) west of A Coruña, Spain with the loss of 35 of the 125 people on board. Survivors were rescued by L'Erlbe (France), North Britain (United Kingdom), local boats or reached shore in the ships' boats. Solway was on a voyage from Southampton, Hampshire, to the West Indies.

== 8 April ==
List of shipwrecks: 8 April 1843
Ship	State	Description
Caribbean	United Kingdom	The ship was sunk by ice off Cape Bollard, Newfoundland, British North America. All on board were rescued. She was on a voyage from the Clyde to Saint John's, Newfoundland.
Maria Anna	Bremen	The ship was run into and sunk off "Weddermarden Hurst" by a Hanovarian pilot cutter. She was on a voyage from Bremen to Cley-next-the-Sea, Norfolk, United Kingdom.
Olive Branch	United Kingdom	The barque ran aground on the Goodwin Sands, Kent. She was on a voyage from Sunderland, County Durham, to Rouen, Seine-Inférieure, France. She was refloated on 10 April and taken into Ramsgate, Kent.
Russell	United Kingdom	The ship was driven ashore at Pevensey Bay, Sussex. Her ten crew survived. She was on a voyage from Newcastle upon Tyne, Northumberland, to Poole, Dorset. Russell was refloated on 13 April and taken into Rye Harbour, Sussex.
St. Leon	France	The ship ran aground at New Orleans, Louisiana, United States. She was on a voyage from New Orleans to Havre de Grâce, Seine-Inférieure.
Whitehaven	United Kingdom	The ship was driven ashore at Kingstown, County Dublin, She was refloated.

== 9 April ==
List of shipwrecks: 9 April 1843
Ship	State	Description
Constitution	United States	The ship was abandoned in the Atlantic Ocean. Her crew were rescued.
Hendrick Robert	Prussia	The ship was abandoned in the North Sea off the coast of Jutland. She came ashore on Amrum, Duchy of Schleswig on 13 April.
Thomas	United Kingdom	The sloop ran aground on the Buxey Sand, in the North Sea off the coast of Suffolk. She was on a voyage from Selby, Yorkshire, to Broomhill. She was refloated.

== 10 April ==
List of shipwrecks: 10 April 1843
Ship	State	Description
Jornfru Elizabeth	Denmark	The ship was wrecked on the Niding Reef. Her crew were rescued. She was on a voyage from Newcastle upon Tyne, Northumberland, United Kingdom, to Copenhagen.
Peak	United Kingdom	The schooner was driven ashore and wrecked at Whitby, Yorkshire. She was refloated on 12 April and taken into Whitby in a severely damaged condition.
Sussex	United Kingdom	The ship was abandoned in the Atlantic Ocean. Her crew were rescued. She was on a voyage from Brier Island, Nova Scotia, British North America, to Saint Lucia.
William and Henry	United Kingdom	The ship ran aground in the Sound of Islay. She was on a voyage from Newcastle upon Tyne to Waterford. She was refloated on 13 April and resumed her voyage.

== 11 April ==
List of shipwrecks: 11 April 1843
Ship	State	Description
Selina	Danzig	The ship ran aground on the Falsterbo Reef. She was refloated and towed into Copenhagen, Denmark.
Success	United Kingdom	The ship was driven ashore at Fremantle, Colony of Western Australia. She was refloated on 18 April. She was on a voyage from London to Fremantle.

== 12 April ==
List of shipwrecks: 12 April 1843
Ship	State	Description
Fenice	Kingdom of Sardinia	The ship was driven ashore near Algeciras, Spain. She was on a voyage from Genoa to Lima, Peru.
Holder Bolden	United States	The whaler was lost in the Pacific to a reef at 26.01N 174.55W, near Lisianski Island, the crew survived and built a schooner over 5 months which departed 14th Sept, arriving Honolulu 8 October, then arranged for recovery of the remaining crew and stores.

== 13 April ==
List of shipwrecks: April 1843
Ship	State	Description
Emily	United Kingdom	The ship ran aground and sank in the Victoria Channel. Her crew were rescued. She was on a voyage from Liverpool, Lancashire, to Halifax, Nova Scotia, British North America.
Golden Eagle	United Kingdom	The ship was driven ashore at Lucca, Grand Duchy of Tuscany. She was on a voyage from Leith, Lothian, to Livorno, Grand Duchy of Tuscany.
Hewes	United States	The full-rigged ship was wrecked on the Goodwin Sands, Kent, United Kingdom. Her crew were rescued by the smack Industry (United Kingdom). She was on a voyage from New York to Hull, Yorkshire, United Kingdom.
Heinrich Robert	Prussia	The ship was driven ashore derelict on Amrum, Duchy of Schleswig.
Helena	Netherlands	The ship struck a sunken rock and foundered in the English Channel off Penzance, Cornwall, United Kingdom. Her crew were rescued. She was on a voyage from Rotterdam, South Holland, to Liverpool, Lancashire, United Kingdom. Helena was refloated on 30 April and taken into Penzance.
Independence	United Kingdom	The ship struck a rock off New Grimsby, Isles of Scilly, and was damaged. She was on a voyage from Shoreham-by-Sea, Sussex, to Neath, Glamorgan. She put into St. Mary's, Isles of Scilly, for repairs.

== 14 April ==
List of shipwrecks: 14 April 1843
Ship	State	Description
Vrouw Stientje	Prussia	The ship was driven ashore near Pillau.

== 15 April ==
List of shipwrecks: 15 April 1843
Ship	State	Description
John and Ellen	United Kingdom	The ship sprang a leak and foundered in the Irish Sea off Howth, County Dublin. Her crew were rescued. She was on a voyage from Bantry, County Cork, to the Clyde.
Lady Grant	United Kingdom	The ship departed from Bombay, India, or Singapore for Chusan, China. No further trace, presumed foundered with the loss of all hands.

== 16 April ==
List of shipwrecks: 16 April 1843
Ship	State	Description
Charlotte	United Kingdom	The ship struck the Bishop Rock, Isles of Scilly, and foundered. Her crew were rescued. She was on a voyage from Cardiff, Glamorgan, to Waterford.
Dolphin	United Kingdom	The ship ran aground, capsized and was severely damaged at Cardiff.
Emilie	France	The ship was wrecked at "Torre Chica". Her crew were rescued.
Maria Anna	Bremen	The ship was run into and sunk off "Weddemarden" by Hanoverian (Kingdom of Hanover). Her crew were rescued. She was on a voyage from Bremen to Cley-next-the-Sea, Norfolk, United Kingdom.
Rosa	Spain	The ship was lost off Puerto Rico. All on board were rescued. She was on a voyage from Cádiz to Havana, Cuba.
Vittoriso Principe Metternich	Austrian Empire	The ship foundered off Norderney, Kingdom of Hanover.

== 17 April ==
List of shipwrecks: 17 April 1843
Ship	State	Description
Bedford	United Kingdom	The smack was discovered abandoned off Lundy Island, Devon. She was on a voyage from Llanelly, Glamorgan, to Southampton, Hampshire. She was taken into Ilfracombe, Devon.
Cumberland	United Kingdom	The barque was driven ashore on the west coast of Horse Island, County Clare. She was on a voyage from Newcastle upon Tyne, Northumberland, to Saint John, New Brunswick, British North America. She was refloated and towed into Kilrush, County Clare, by the steamship Garry Owen (United Kingdom).
Eliza	United Kingdom	The ship ran aground on The Shingles, off the Isle of Wight. She was on a voyage from London to Lancaster, Lancashire. She was refloated and resumed her voyage.

== 19 April ==
List of shipwrecks: 19 April 1843
Ship	State	Description
Enfield	United Kingdom	The schooner ran aground at South Shields, County Durham. She was on a voyage from Cardiff, Glamorgan, to South Shields.

== 21 April ==
List of shipwrecks: 21 April 1843
Ship	State	Description
Mary	United Kingdom	The brig ran aground on the Hoborg Reef, off Gotland, Sweden. She was refloated but consequently foundered. Her crew survived. She was on a voyage from Montrose, Forfarshire, to Riga, Russia.

== 22 April ==
List of shipwrecks: 22 April 1843
Ship	State	Description
Sarah & Rachel	United Kingdom	The oyster skiff was lost in the Bristol Channel with the loss of both crew.

== 23 April ==
List of shipwrecks: 23 April 1843
Ship	State	Description
Croft	United Kingdom	The ship foundered in the North Sea off Eyemouth, Berwickshire. Her crew were rescued. She was on a voyage from Grangemouth, Stirlingshire, to Berwick upon Tweed, Northumberland.
Fame	United Kingdom	The schooner struck Avery's Rock and was severely damaged. She put into Pigeon Cove, Newfoundland, British North America.
Hope	United Kingdom	The ship sprang a leak and was beached at Blyth, Northumberland. She was on a voyage from Alloa, Clackmannanshire, to Newcastle upon Tyne, Northumberland.
Mary and Isabella	United Kingdom	The ship was destroyed by fire in the North Sea off the Buchan Ness Lighthouse, Aberdeenshire. Her three crew survived. She was on a voyage from Sunderland, County Durham, to the Moray Firth.
Mary Ann	United Kingdom	The ship was destroyed by fire off Seal Island, Nova Scotia, British North America. She was on a voyage from Saint John, New Brunswick, to London.

== 24 April ==
List of shipwrecks: 24 April 1843
Ship	State	Description
William Glen Anderson	United Kingdom	The ship ran aground at New Orleans, Louisiana, United States. She was on a voyage from New Orleans to Liverpool, Lancashire.

== 25 April ==
List of shipwrecks: 25 April 1843
Ship	State	Description
Don	United Kingdom	The smack ran aground at Wick, Caithness. She was on a voyage from Leith, Lothian, to Wick. She was later refloated and taken into Wick.

== 26 April ==
List of shipwrecks: 26 April 1843
Ship	State	Description
British Queen	United Kingdom	The ship was destroyed by fire at Antigua. She was on a voyage from Havana, Cuba, to Cowes, Isle of Wight.
Diana	United Kingdom	The whaler was severely damaged by an explosion at Saint Helena. She was consequently condemned.
Giacomo Giorgio	Papal States	The ship was wrecked near Santarcangelo de Romagna. She was on a voyage from Liverpool, Lancashire, United Kingdom, to Ancona.
Hope	United Kingdom	The ship was driven ashore and wrecked at Blyth, Northumberland.
Mary Ann	United Kingdom	The ship was driven ashore at Cambois, Northumberland. She was on a voyage from London to Cambois. She was refloated and towed into Blyth.
R. La Maure	France	The ship ran aground on the Haisborough Sands, in the North Sea off the coast of Norfolk, United Kingdom, and sank. Her crew were rescued. She was on a voyage from Hartlepool, County Durham, United Kingdom, to Bordeaux, Gironde.
Tennant	United Kingdom	The ship sprang a leak whilst on a voyage from Glasgow, Renfrewshire, to Stettin. She put into Lerwick, Shetland Islands in a sinking condition.

== 27 April ==
List of shipwrecks: 27 April 1843
Ship	State	Description
Adeline	United Kingdom	The ship was wrecked at Barrington, Nova Scotia, British North America. She was on a voyage from Sunderland, County Durham, to Saint John, New Brunswick, British North America.
Brunette	United Kingdom	The ship was wrecked on St. Paul's Island, Nova Scotia. She was on a voyage from Liverpool, Lancashire, to Quebec City, Province of Canada, British North America.
Hermine	Prussia	The ship was driven ashore and wrecked south of the Mull of Kintyre Lighthouse, Argyllshire, United Kingdom. She was on a voyage from Memel to Belfast, County Antrim, United Kingdom.

== 28 April ==
List of shipwrecks: 28 April 1843
Ship	State	Description
Adelphia	United Kingdom	The brig was driven ashore and wrecked at Blanch Point, Nova Scotia, British North America. Her crew were rescued. She was on a voyage from Hartlepool, County Durham, to Saint John, New Brunswick, British North America.

== 29 April ==
List of shipwrecks: 29 April 1843
Ship	State	Description
Catherine	United Kingdom	The ship collided with Ann Elizabeth (United Kingdom) off the Longships Lighthouse, Cornwall, and foundered. Her crew were rescued. She was on a voyage from a Welsh port to Falmouth, Cornwall.
Ebenezer	United Kingdom	The brig collided with Juno (United Kingdom) in the North Sea off Lowestoft, Suffolk, and was abandoned. Her crew were rescued.
William Rippon	United Kingdom	The brig was sunk by ice off Cape North, Nova Scotia, British North America. Her crew survived. She was on a voyage from Sunderland, County Durham, to Quebec City, Province of Canada, British North America.

== 30 April ==
List of shipwrecks: 30 April 1843
Ship	State	Description
Ocean	United Kingdom	The ship was driven ashore and wrecked at Orlock Point, County Down. Her crew were rescued.
Oswego	United States	The brig was driven ashore at Buenos Aires.
William and Thomas	United Kingdom	The ship ran aground off Cardiff, Glamorgan, and was damaged. She put into Milford Haven, Pembrokeshire, in a sinking condition. She was on a voyage from Newport, Monmouthshire, to Youghal, County Cork.

== Unknown date ==
List of shipwrecks: Unknown date in April 1843
Ship	State	Description
Barbara Ann	(United Kingdom of Great Britain and Ireland) British North America	The brigantine was abandoned in the Atlantic Ocean (48°17′N 9°11′W) before 11 April. Her seven crew were rescued by the brig James ( (United Kingdom of Great Britain and Ireland) ) British North America). Barbara Ann was on a voyage from Port Talbot, Glamorgan, to Alicante, Spain.
Breton	(United Kingdom of Great Britain and Ireland) British North America	The sealer was sunk by ice south of Saint John's, Newfoundland, before 8 April.
Catherine Power	(United Kingdom of Great Britain and Ireland) British North America	The sealer was sunk by ice south of Saint John's before 8 April.
Charlotte	(United Kingdom of Great Britain and Ireland) British North America	The sealer was sunk by ice south of Saint John's before 8 April.
Dart	(United Kingdom of Great Britain and Ireland) British North America	The sealer was sunk by ice south of Saint John's before 8 April.
Despatch	(United Kingdom of Great Britain and Ireland) British North America	The sealer was sunk by ice south of Saint John's before 8 April.
Don	United Kingdom	The smack was driven ashore at Wick, Caithness. She was refloated on 28 April.
Favourite	(United Kingdom of Great Britain and Ireland) New South Wales	The schooner was wrecked at the mouth of the Richmond River.
Henry and Mary Ann	(United Kingdom of Great Britain and Ireland) British North America	The sealer was sunk by ice south of Saint John's before 8 April.
Industry	(United Kingdom of Great Britain and Ireland) British North America	The sealer was sunk by ice south of Saint John's before 8 April.
John and Mary	United Kingdom	The ship was driven ashore at Troon, Ayrshire. She was refloated on 13 April.
Joseph Pease	United Kingdom	The ship was abandoned off Seal Island, Nova Scotia, British North America, before 23 April.
Louis	France	The brig was wrecked in the Bay of Hioff, Africa, with the loss of seven of her crew before 26 April.
Louise	Hamburg	The ship was lost off Barcelona, Spain. She was on a voyage from Hamburg to Barcelona.
Mary	(United Kingdom of Great Britain and Ireland) British North America	The sealer was sunk by ice south of Saint John's before 8 April.
Ocean	(United Kingdom of Great Britain and Ireland) British North America	The sealer was sunk by ice south of Saint John's before 8 April.
Princess	(United Kingdom of Great Britain and Ireland) British North America	The sealer was driven by onto a reef off Hant's Harbour, Newfoundland before 8 April with the loss of fifteen of her crew. She was subsequently taken into New Harbour, Newfoundland.
Rover	(United Kingdom of Great Britain and Ireland) British North America	The sealer was sunk by ice south of Saint John's before 8 April.
Sapphire	United States	The ship was wrecked on the Bahama Bank before 8 April.
Shamrock	United Kingdom	The ship was driven ashore at Dungeness, Kent. She was refloated on 30 April.
Singular	Spain	The brig was wrecked on the Prata Shoal before 16 April. Her crew were rescued by Emma (United Kingdom.
Three Sisters	United Kingdom	The schooner was driven ashore and wrecked near the Dungeness Lighthouse, Kent, before 9 April.
Twee Gebroeders	Netherlands	The ship was wrecked on the Kan Galangs before 4 April. She was on a voyage from Batavia to Makassar, Netherlands East Indies.
