= Newfoundland and Labrador Route 74 =

Highway in Newfoundland and Labrador, Canada

Route 74
- Heart's Content Highway

Route information
- Maintained by Newfoundland and Labrador Department of Transportation and Infrastructure
- Length: 15.8 km (9.8 mi)

Major junctions
- West end: Route 80 in Heart's Content
- East end: Route 70 in Victoria

Location
- Country: Canada
- Province: Newfoundland and Labrador

Highway system
- Highways in Newfoundland and Labrador
| ← Route 73 | → Route 75 |

Route 74, also known as Heart's Content Highway, is a 15.8-kilometre-long (9.8 mi) east–west highway on the Avalon Peninsula of Newfoundland. It connects the towns of Heart's Content and Victoria, with no other major intersections or communities along the highway besides at its two termini, Route 80 (Trinity Road) in Heart's Content, and Route 70 (Conception Bay Highway) in Victoria.

== Major intersections ==
| Location | km | mi | Destinations | Notes |
|---|---|---|---|---|
| Heart's Content | 0.0 | 0.0 | Route 80 (Trinity Road) – Dildo, Green's Harbour, Old Perlican | Western terminus |
| Victoria | 15.8 | 9.8 | Route 70 (Conception Bay Highway/Baccalieu Trail) – Carbonear, Salmon Cove, Old Perlican | Eastern terminus |
1.000 mi = 1.609 km; 1.000 km = 0.621 mi
