= Division No. 1, Subdivision E, Newfoundland and Labrador =

Subdivision 1E
- Unorganized territory
- Division No. 1, Subdivision E
- Location within Newfoundland
- Country: Canada
- Province: Newfoundland and Labrador
- Census division: Division 1

Government
  - MHA: Sherry Gambin-Walsh (LPNL, Placentia-St. Mary's)
  - MP: Jonathan Rowe (CON, Terra Nova-The Peninsulas)

Area
  - Land: 218.91 km^{2} (84.52 sq mi)

Population (2016)
  - Total: 2,943
  - Density: 13.4/km^{2} (35/sq mi)
- Time zone: UTC-3:30 (Newfoundland Time)
  - Summer (DST): UTC-2:30 (Newfoundland Daylight)
- Highways: Route 73; Route 80

Division No. 1, Subdivision E is an unorganized subdivision along the southeast coast of Trinity Bay on the Avalon Peninsula in Newfoundland and Labrador, Canada. It is in Division 1 and contains the unincorporated communities of Broad Cove, Cavendish, Dildo, Green's Harbour, Harnum Point, Hopeall, New Harbour and Reids Room.

== Dildo ==
See: Dildo, Newfoundland and Labrador

== Green's Harbour ==
Green's Harbour is located on the south shore of Trinity Bay about 35 km (22 mi) from Heart's Content. Population 850.

In 1866, the community was visited by the SS Great Eastern entering the harbour. In 1869 the first school was erected, by the Methodist Church. In 1871, Greens Harbour was described as,

A large fishing settlement on south side of Trinity Bay, district of Trinity. The people are engaged in ship building and farming to some extent. The scenery around here is remarkably beautiful. Distant from Heart's Content 23 miles by road, and from New Harbor 9 miles by road. Mail weekly. Population 210.

The late 1800s was a period of community growth: the first marriage was recorded in 1874, and the first teacher appointed the year following. The Way Office was also established in 1875 with the first waymaster Simon Reid. The first official Methodist church was built in 1884, and the first post office opened in Green's Harbour, under postmaster Hezekiah Burt in 1890 and Postmaster William Mitcham in 1891.

In 1907, 18 deaths recorded in Green's Harbour. In 1914 the first train passed, and in 1916 Ambrose Penney sported Green's Harbour's first automobile. In 1930 the settlement became lighted and connected by phone for the first time. The power was flickered on by Mr. Henry March. Originally only one bulb was allowed per household because it was all that the transmitters could withstand. The Salvation Army built its school in 1931. The population in 1956 was 608.

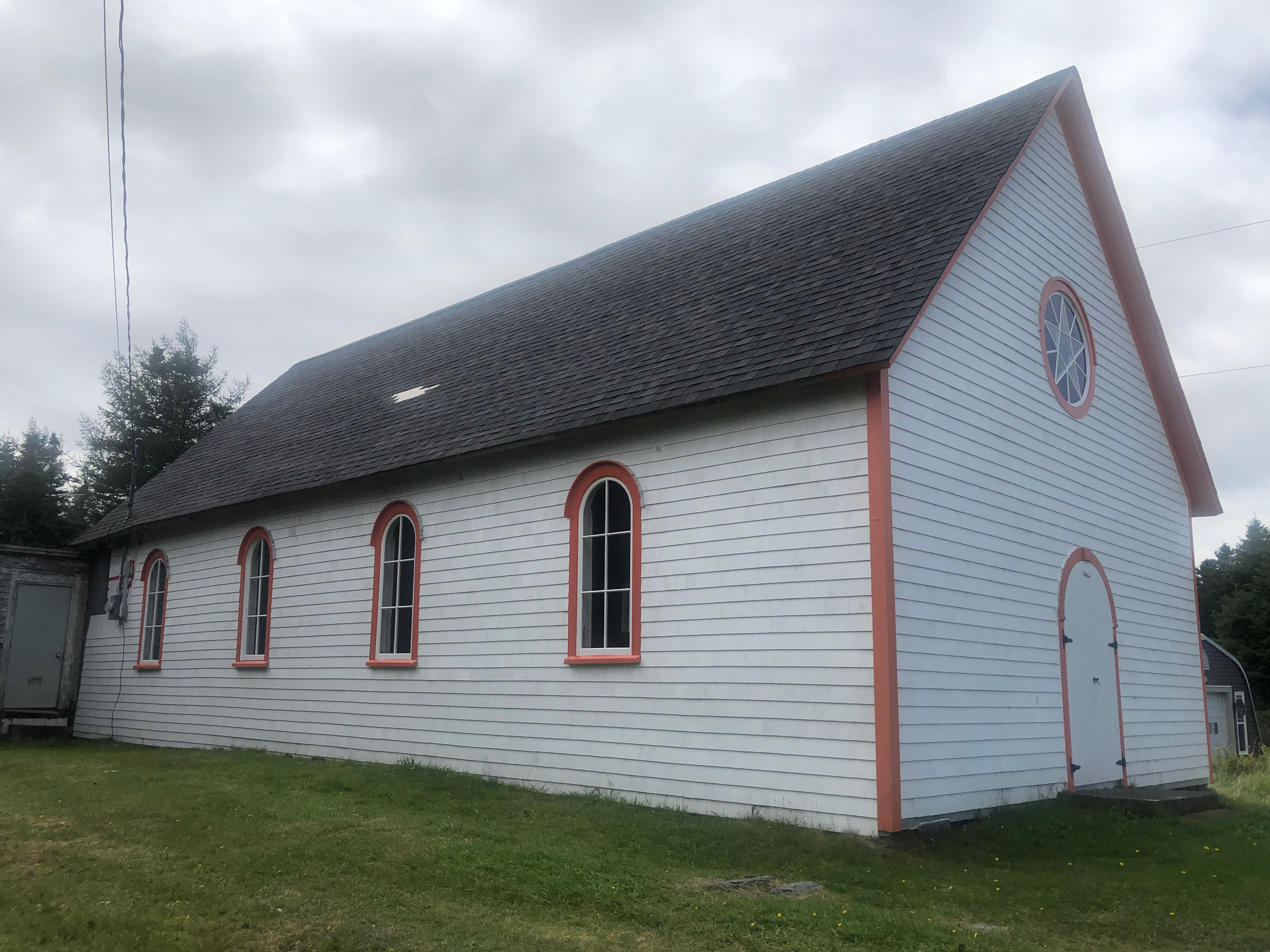
Exterior view of the Heart and Hand lodge, Greens Harbour

=== Heart and Hand Loyal Orange Lodge #9 ===
The wooden Heart and Hand Loyal Orange Lodge #9 was formally recognized as a Registered Heritage Structure on 1995/04/01 and is listed on the Canadian Register of Historic Places. The structure features a unique circular window with a star motif in the gable end, arched windows and door, and wooden shingles.

== Hopeall ==
47°37′00″N 53°31′00″W Hopeall is a village in the Trinity Bay area. The first Postmistress was Mona Gilbert in 1961. The population was 187 in 1956.

== New Harbour ==
See: New Harbour, Newfoundland and Labrador
