= Blaketown, Newfoundland and Labrador =

Blaketown
- Local service district / designated place
- Location of Blaketown in Newfoundland
- Coordinates: 47°28′30″N 53°32′49.2″W
- Country: Canada
- Province: Newfoundland and Labrador

Population (2021)
  - Total: 619
- Time zone: UTC-3:30 (Newfoundland Standard Time)
  - Summer (DST): UTC-2:30 (Newfoundland Daylight)
- Area code: 709
- Highways: Route 80

Blaketown is a local service district and designated place in the Canadian province of Newfoundland and Labrador.

As Blaketown is on the Route 80 (Trinity Road) (highway), a few service businesses emerged, including a small grocery store and a gas station. In more recent years, several other businesses have begun operation, including a hardware retailer, an auto repair shop, a woodworking enterprise, an auto parts outlet and a Regional High School. The lake, that extends most of the length of Blaketown, is Dildo Pond, although it is referred to by locals as Blaketown Pond.

== History ==
Blaketown was named after Sir Henry Arthur Blake, Governor of Newfoundland (1887–1889), was settled in 1888 as an agricultural district. Thirty two families from the Conception Bay communities of Upper Island Cove, Bishops Cove, Spaniards Bay and Bay Roberts settled along the Dildo Agricultural Road, a stretch of road between South Dildo and Whitbourne. A Church of England school/church was constructed around 1890 to accommodate an approximate population of 262. The agricultural experiment failed as the land in the area was not suitable for farming and the settlers who had been fishermen were not properly trained in farming. By 1911 the number of full-time farmers in Blaketown had decreased to only three. The lumber industry had taken over a significant part of the economy. In 1955 the Government of Newfoundland attempted to centralize the mink fur farming industry in the province in Blaketown. The Newfoundland Fur Farmers' Co-op was formed to provide feed, from fish and whale meat to supply the numerous fur farms. With the banning of the whale hunt in 1972 the fur industry also collapsed.

== Geography ==
Blaketown is in Newfoundland within Subdivision Y of Division No. 1.

== Demographics ==
As a designated place in the 2016 Census of Population conducted by Statistics Canada, Blaketown recorded a population of 605 living in 252 of its 306 total private dwellings, a change of 18.4% from its 2011 population of 511. With a land area of 19.94 km^{2} (7.70 sq mi), it had a population density of 30.3/km^{2} (78.6/sq mi) in 2016.

== Government ==
Blaketown is a local service district (LSD) that is governed by a committee responsible for the provision of certain services to the community.

== See also ==
- List of designated places in Newfoundland and Labrador
- List of local service districts in Newfoundland and Labrador
- Newfoundland and Labrador Route 80
