= Winterton, Newfoundland and Labrador =

Coordinates: 47°57′20″N 53°19′40″W

Winterton
- Town
- Interactive map of Winterton
- Country: Canada
- Province: Newfoundland and Labrador

Population (2021)
  - Total: 436
- Time zone: UTC-3:30 (Newfoundland Time)
  - Summer (DST): UTC-2:30 (Newfoundland Daylight)
- Area code: 709
- Highways: Route 80

Winterton is a town in the Canadian province of Newfoundland and Labrador. It was originally named Sille Cove or Scilly Cove. In 1912 the town was named Winterton for Sir James Spearman Winter, former Prime Minister of Newfoundland.

Winterton is located on Winterton Cove off Trinity Bay on the western side of the Avalon Peninsula on Newfoundland's east coast. Its bedrock is Precambrian-era gray and black shale. The soil is a very stony, acidic loam with classic podzol profile development, mapped as Turk's Cove series; peat is common in poorly drained areas.

The town had a population of 518 in the Canada 2006 Census. The first record of settlement is found in Captain John Berry's Report to the British Admiralty in which he indicates that, in 1675, there were three fishing enterprises. These fishing crews departed from the West Country of England, probably from the city of Poole in Dorset, in the early spring of each year to fish in waters near the coast; the fish would be salted and dried in structures along the shore known as stages and flakes and shipped to England in the Fall. The three fishing Captains were Hopkins, Wicksell and Peyton who, along with their crews, comprised a population of less than 100.

The small boats suitable for fishing in near shore waters were constructed using local timber following ancient designs and using implements and tools whose origins can be traced to Saxon England. The Winterton Boat Building and Community Museum, now rebranded as the Wooden Boat Museum of Newfoundland and Labrador, has preserved these ancient techniques and tools; the museum has on display newly constructed boats as well as the tools and axe hewn timbers.

The next record of settlement in Scilly Cove (Winterton) is found in the 1697 journal of Jean Baudoin, a priest who accompanied d'Iberville on his expedition around the coast of Newfoundland. At Scilly Cove he reported that there were four houses along with fishing structures as well as livestock, which were all destroyed before the soldiers departed. Settlers fled to the nearby forest to escape the invaders.

In 2022, Grammy winning Canadian music producer, Greg Wells, purchased St. Luke's Anglican Church in the community. The church is still open to the public for religious purposes and Wells hopes to use the property to showcase local talent and raise money for the community.

== Demographics ==
In the 2021 Census of Population conducted by Statistics Canada, Winterton had a population of 436 living in 204 of its 287 total private dwellings, a change of −3.1% from its 2016 population of 450. With a land area of 10.61 km^{2} (4.10 sq mi), it had a population density of 41.1/km^{2} (106.4/sq mi) in 2021.

== Attractions ==
- Sugarloaf Trail
- Trinity South D'Iberville Trail
- St. Luke's Anglican Church, now owned by Canadian music producer Greg Wells
- Wooden Boat Museum of Newfoundland and Labrador

== See also ==
- List of cities and towns in Newfoundland and Labrador
- Winterton. NL Ancestor, 12.4 (1996).
