= New Harbour, Newfoundland and Labrador =

New Harbour
- Local service district / designated place
- Location within Newfoundland
- Coordinates: 47°35′10″N 53°32′26″W
- Country: Canada
- Province: Newfoundland and Labrador
- Census division: Division 1
- Census subdivision: Subdivision E

Government Governed by Committee of volunteers
  - Type: Local Service District
  - Chairperson: Brian Crandford

Area
  - Total: 2.6 km^{2} (1 sq mi)

Population (2016)
  - Total: 491
  - Density: 190/km^{2} (490/sq mi)
- Time zone: UTC-3:30 (Newfoundland Time)
  - Summer (DST): UTC-2:30 (Newfoundland Daylight)
- Postal code: A0B 2P0
- Area code: 709
- Highways: Route 73; Route 80

New Harbour is a local service district and designated place in the Canadian province of Newfoundland and Labrador. It is on the east shore of Trinity Bay, along Provincial Route 80. Route 80's intersection with Route 73 is inside New Harbour.

Going as far back as 1800, it was a major ship building centre.

In the past, the railroad served to provide the transportation of paper from the Grand Falls Mill to Heart's Content, for shipping to foreign markets.

== History ==
New Harbour was first settled by Europeans, during the mid-1700s. Various families settled in New Harbour, each in its own Room; (a Room is a few acres of land where sons, grandsons etc. all built their homes). For example, Thornes' Room fronts on the Pond; generations of Thornes have built homes on the nearby lands. Earlier family names include Pitcher, Williams, Newhook, Higdon, Woodman, Pollett, Cranford, Hillier, Hefford, George, Thorne. The people of New Hr. have made livings from industries such as Fishing, Shipbuilding, the Pothead Drive, Hunting, Mink Ranching, Farming and from Working Seasonally, in distant places.

Going as far back as 1800, or perhaps before that, the Newhook Family, led by Master Shipbuilder Charles Newhook (first) were noted as being Newfoundland's greatest family of shipbuilders. Charles Newhook (second) moved to New Harbour from Trinity, also in Trinity Bay around 1806 to become master shipbuilder and leading inhabitant. From that point in time up to the early 1900s, New Harbour was a premier site for shipbuilding.

=== Archaeological site ===
At excavations like Anderson's Cove near New Harbour, evidence points to it being home to the Dorset culture, maritime archaic First Nations and the Beothuk people some thousands of years ago. The first people to live in Newfoundland, the Maritime Archaic Indians arriving on the island about 5000 years ago and seem to have disappeared around 3200 years ago. In the summer of 1993, Dr. Paul Bonisteel, a resident of New Harbour, was walking in Anderson's Cove, located about a mile (1.6 km) northeast of Dildo Island between the communities of New Harbour and Dildo, when he discovered a large Maritime Archaic stone axe eroding from the bank above the beach.

In the fall of 1995, the BTHC undertook an archaeological survey of Anderson's Cove and in 1996 some preliminary excavations were conducted. Fragments of stone tools and flakes were found scattered over a large area but no camp site was discovered. It may be that there is an Archaic camp site at Anderson's Cove and it has yet to be discovered. On the other hand, it is possible that the camp has been washed into the sea over the more than 3000 years since the site was abandoned. While none of the artifacts found at Anderson's Cove allow us to say when the site was first occupied, a Maritime Archaic spear point found in Collier Bay, roughly 6 miles (9.6 km) to the west of Anderson's Cove, dates to about 4500 years ago and it seems likely that Anderson's Cove was occupied around the same time.

== Geography ==
New Harbour, Trinity Bay is in Newfoundland within Subdivision E of Division No. 1.

== Demographics ==
As a designated place in the 2016 Census of Population conducted by Statistics Canada, New Harbour, Trinity Bay recorded a population of 491 living in 207 of its 236 total private dwellings, a change of −2% from its 2011 population of 501. With a land area of 11.83 km^{2} (4.57 sq mi), it had a population density of 41.5/km^{2} (107.5/sq mi) in 2016.

== Government ==
New Harbour, Trinity Bay is a local service district (LSD) that is governed by a committee responsible for the provision of certain services to the community. The current chairperson of the LSD committee is Fred Woodman. https://www.gov.nl.ca/mca/files/Newfoundland-and-Labrador-Directory-of-Local-Service-Districts-Information-as-of-March-16-2026.pdf

== See also ==
- List of communities in Newfoundland and Labrador
- List of designated places in Newfoundland and Labrador
- List of local service districts in Newfoundland and Labrador
