= Newfoundland and Labrador Route 73 =

Highway in Newfoundland and Labrador, Canada

Route 73
- New Harbour Road; Back Track Road

Route information
- Maintained by Newfoundland and Labrador Department of Transportation and Infrastructure
- Length: 19.2 km (11.9 mi)

Major junctions
- West end: Route 80 in New Harbour
- Route 75 in Tilton
- East end: Route 70 in Tilton

Location
- Country: Canada
- Province: Newfoundland and Labrador

Highway system
- Highways in Newfoundland and Labrador
← Route 72	→ Route 74

Route 73 is a 19.2-kilometre-long (11.9 mi) east–west highway on the Avalon Peninsula of Newfoundland. It connects the towns of New Harbour and Spaniard's Bay via Tilton and Route 70. The majority of Route 73 is known as New Harbour Road, except within the town limits of Spaniard's Bay, where it is known as Back Track Road. The highway crosses an area known as the New Harbour Barrens.

== Route description ==
Route 73 begins at an intersection with Route 80 (Trinity Road) in the easternmost part of New Harbour. It heads east through rural wooded terrain for several miles to enter the Spaniard's Bay town limits, and Tilton, to have an interchange with Route 75 (Veterans Memorial Highway). The highway passes through neighbourhoods before coming to an end at an intersection with Route 70 (Conception Bay Highway).

== Major intersections ==
Location	km	mi	Destinations	Notes
New Harbour	0.0	0.0	Route 80 (Trinity Road) – Dildo, Green's Harbour	Western terminus
Tilton	17.5	10.9	Route 75 (Veterans Memorial Highway) – Bay Roberts, Carbonear	Interchange
Tilton	19.2	11.9	Route 70 (Conception Bay Highway/Baccalieu Trail) – Harbour Grace, Spaniard's Bay	Eastern terminus
1.000 mi = 1.609 km; 1.000 km = 0.621 mi
