= Collier Bay =

Collier Bay may refer to:

- Collier Bay, Newfoundland, Canada
- Collier Bay, Western Australia
- Collier Bay (horse), a British racehorse
