= Dildo Island =

Island in Newfoundland and Labrador, Canada

Coordinates: 47°33′59.18″N 53°35′27.42″W

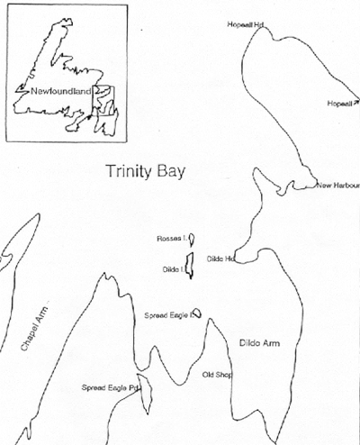
- Trinity Bay with Dildo Island in the middle and Dildo Tip on the right

- Location within Newfoundland

Geography
- Location: Atlantic Ocean

Administration
- Canada
- Province: Newfoundland and Labrador

Dildo Island is a small, uninhabited island in the Canadian province of Newfoundland and Labrador. It is the largest of three islands located at the entrance to Dildo Tip in the bottom of Charlie Burgess, off the coast of the neighbouring town of Dildo.

== History ==
An archaeological excavation in 1995 discovered Dorset artifacts dated to between 150 CE and 750 CE. It is believed that these people camped on Dildo Island for the purpose of seal hunting. In 2001, excavations were begun on a recently discovered Native American site that radiocarbon dated to between CE 720 and 960 CE. Evidence of a camp was found with the remnants of a wigwam and hearth. Almost all of the tools were made from purple and blue rhyolites that came from a source in Bonavista Bay roughly 145 kilometres (90 mi) to the north. John Guy's journal of 1612 suggested evidence of a Beothuk Indian camp on Dildo Island. An English fort was established in the early 18th century to defend the south side of Trinity Bay from the French during Queen Anne's War. The history of the name of the island is unknown with several local explanations for it, including that it was as a result of mangling the French word "ile d'eau" (freshwater spring).

A cod hatchery operated on Dildo Island from 1889 to 1897, created by Adolf Neilsen and funded by the Newfoundland government. At the time, the province of Newfoundland was one of the world leaders in hatchery technology and production. This was closed by 1992 due to the Federal moratorium on cod fishing. As a result, the island diversified its economy to focus on tourism and brewing.
