= Heart's Content Cable Station =

Western end of the first permanent trans-oceanic telegraph cable

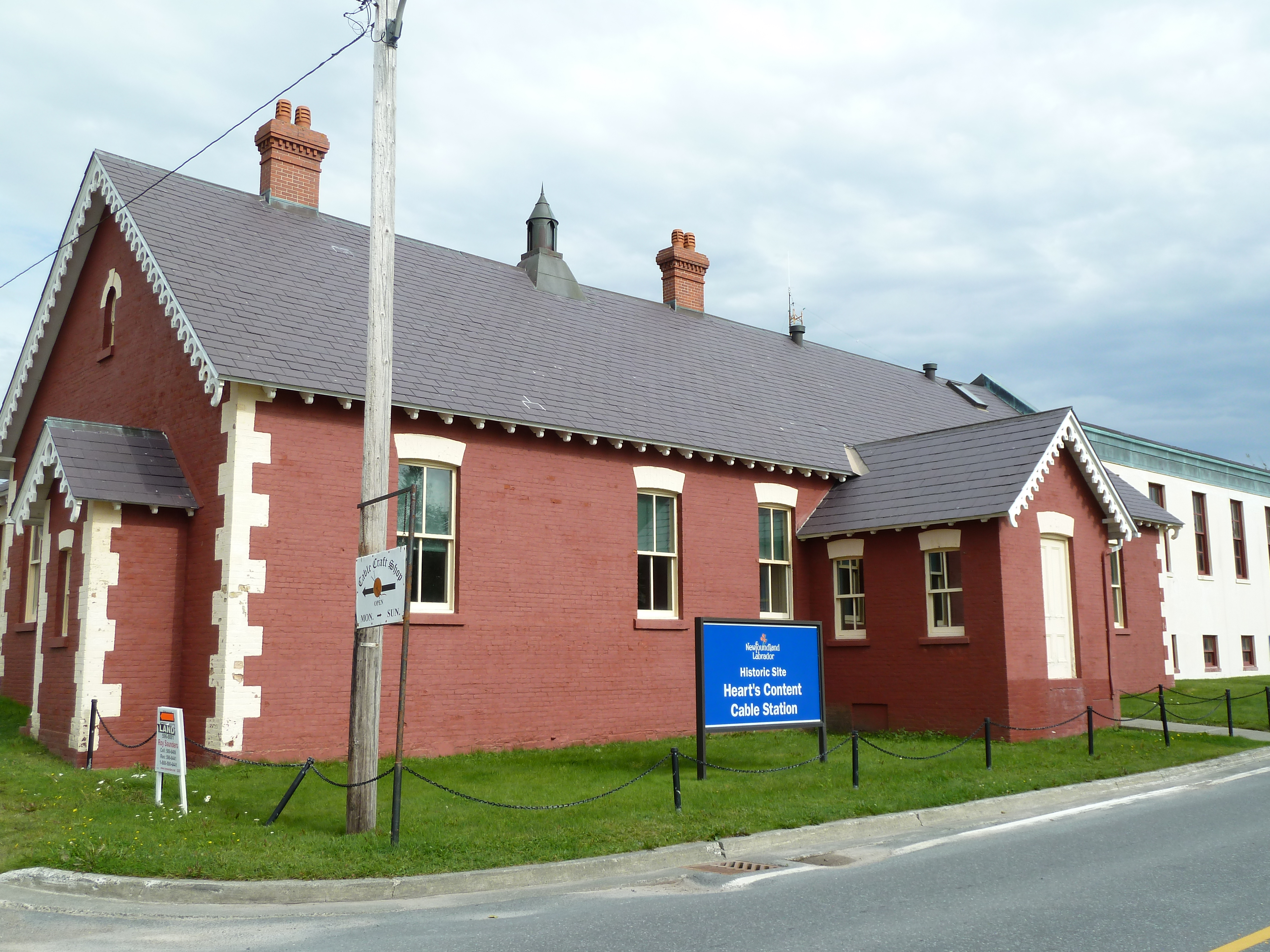

- Location within Newfoundland

General information
- Location: Heart's Content, Newfoundland and Labrador, Canada
- Coordinates: 47°52′21.1″N 53°22′7.1″W
- Groundbreaking: 1875
- Completed: 1876
- Renovated: 1918
- Closed: 1965

Design and construction
- Architect: J.J. Southcott

Heart's Content Cable Station is a former cable landing station located in Heart's Content, Newfoundland and Labrador. It served as the western terminus of the first permanent trans-oceanic submarine telegraph cable, while a sister cable station on Valentia Island, Ireland, served as the eastern terminus. The original cable was first brought ashore in Heart's Content on July 27, 1866, and the station remained in use until it was closed in 1965. The station was designated a Provincial Historic Site in 1974 and is now a museum. On December 20, 2017, it was announced that the Heart's Content Cable Station would be one of eight new sites nominated by the Canadian Government for UNESCO World Heritage Site status.

== History ==
The cable was first brought ashore on July 27, 1866, after several failed attempts. The cable was brought to Heart's Content by the Great Eastern, the largest steamship afloat at the time. Cable maintenance ships would regularly visit Heart's Content to repair and perform maintenance on the cables. The first messages were sent across the cable using Morse code, with three people working at the Heart's Content station to send and receive these messages. While the cable station was originally established in Heart's Content by the Anglo-American Telegraph Company, it was later taken over by the Western Union Telegraph Company in 1912. When the Anglo-American Telegraph Company owned the station, they commission the construction of staff housing in Heart's Content. The town saw another construction boom when Western Union purchased the station. At its peak, over 200 people in Heart's Content worked for the cable company, bringing in trained professionals from Canada and England. In the years succeeding World War I, cable traffic began to slow down and automated equipment started being installed at the station. The station was closed in 1965, due to the telegraph cable becoming obsolete with the emergence of trans-oceanic telephone cables and communications satellites.

== Construction ==
The Heart's Content Cable Station, with the 1876 original building on the left (red) and 1918 extension on the right (white)

Construction of the cable station office started in 1875 and was completed in 1876. The building was designed by J.J. Southcott, a prominent architect based in St. John's. In 1918, an extension was added to the building so that it could handle increased traffic. The original section of the building features a Gothic style bargeboard and is overall typical of the architecture of 19th century industrial buildings found in Newfoundland outports. The 1918 addition is reflective of both changes in technology and changes in society, as it features a second washroom for female staff.

== Preservation ==
The cable station has been a Provincial Historic Site of Newfoundland and Labrador since 1974 and became a museum in the same year. The museum features many machines used during the station's years of operation, as well as interpretive displays.

On December 20, 2017, Environment Minister Catherine McKenna announced that Heart's Content Cable Station was one of eight sites that would be added to Canada's tentative list of UNESCO World Heritage Sites. The justification for inscription was based on criteria (ii) and (iv). However, unlike the other eight newly proposed sites, Heart's Content Cable Station was not added to Canada's tentative list in 2018. The Canadian government is currently working with the government of the Republic of Ireland in order to create a transboundary World Heritage Site consisting of both the station at Heart's Content and the station on Valentia Island. On December 20, 2022, Heart's Content Cable Station and Valentia Cable Station were officially submitted to the UNESCO as a site entitled "Transatlantic Cable Ensemble" and is now part of Canada's tentative list.
