= Bishop's Cove =

- Town
- Location of Bishop's Cove in Newfoundland
- Coordinates: 47°38′06.59″N 53°13′55.29″W
- Country: Canada
- Province: Newfoundland and Labrador
- Incorporated: 1969

Government
  - Mayor: Gary N. Smith

Area
  - Land: 4.9 km^{2} (1.88 sq mi)

Population (2021)
  - Total: 252
  - Density: 152/km^{2} (390/sq mi)
- Time zone: UTC-3:30 (Newfoundland Time)
  - Summer (DST): UTC-2:30 (Newfoundland Daylight)
- Area code: 709

Bishop's Cove is a town in the Canadian province of Newfoundland and Labrador situated in Spaniard's Bay on the Avalon Peninsula.

== History ==
Originally called Bread and Cheese Cove, the cove was renamed for the Rev. John Inglis, an Anglican bishop who toured Newfoundland in 1827 after it became part of his diocese. Early family names in the area include "Smith", "Barrett" and several variations of "Menchions", with possible claims to the land going back as early as 1625.

== Demographics ==
In the 2021 Census of Population conducted by Statistics Canada, Bishop's Cove had a population of 252 living in 115 of its 147 total private dwellings, a change of −12.2% from its 2016 population of 287. With a land area of 1.9 km^{2} (0.73 sq mi), it had a population density of 132.6/km^{2} (343.5/sq mi) in 2021.

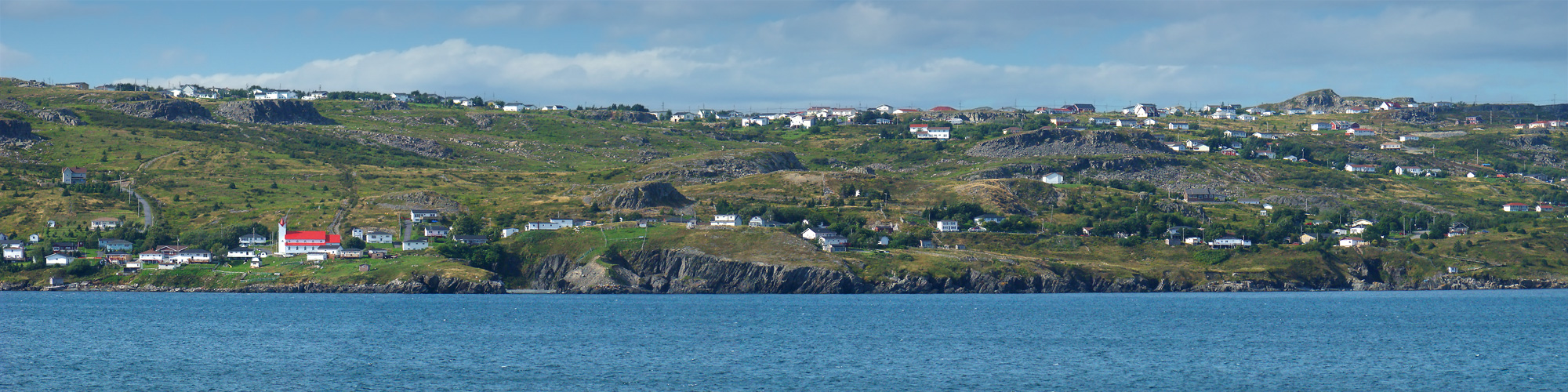
On the shore of Conception Bay

== See also ==
- List of cities and towns in Newfoundland and Labrador
