= Hant's Harbour =

- Town
- Seal

- Location of Hant's Harbour in Newfoundland
- Coordinates: 48°00′55″N 53°15′45″W
- Country: Canada
- Province: Newfoundland and Labrador

Population (2021)
  - Total: 318
- Time zone: UTC-3:30 (Newfoundland Time)
  - Summer (DST): UTC-2:30 (Newfoundland Daylight)
- Postal Code: A0B 1Y0
- Area code: 709
- Telephone Exchanges: 586, 591
- Highways: Route 80
- Hant's Harbour Lighthouse
- Constructed: 1881 (first)
- Foundation: concrete base
- Construction: wooden tower (first and current)
- Height: 9 m (30 ft)
- Shape: octagonal prism tower with balcony and lantern square drustum tower with balcony and lantern (current)
- Markings: white tower, red lantern
- Power source: solar power
- Operator: Canadian Coast Guard
- First lit: 1957 (current)
- Focal height: 20 m (66 ft)
- Lens: eighth-order Fresnel lens
- Range: 13 nmi (24 km; 15 mi)
- Characteristic: Iso W 6s

Hant's Harbour (48°00′55″N 53°15′45″W NST) is an incorporated town located on the east side of Trinity Bay on the Bay de Verde Peninsula in the province of Newfoundland and Labrador, Canada. It has a population of 318 according to the 2021 Canadian census.

== Geography ==
Hant's Harbour is a small fishing village built around a small harbour which opens on the north to Trinity Bay. The harbour waters are able to accommodate vessels up to 100 tons, the landscapes which surround it are low hills which are rocky and barren.

== Demographics ==
In the 2021 Census of Population conducted by Statistics Canada, Hant's Harbour had a population of 318 living in 158 of its 217 total private dwellings, a change of −3.3% from its 2016 population of 329. With a land area of 31.86 km^{2} (12.30 sq mi), it had a population density of 10.0/km^{2} (25.9/sq mi) in 2021.

== History ==
During King William's War (1688–1697), the village was destroyed in the Avalon Peninsula Campaign. Like most of the early settlements around the coast of Newfoundland, the population grew very slowly during the eighteenth century.

Hant's Harbour early residents were mostly of the Church of England, during the eighteenth century they depended upon the services of clergy on the irregular visits of the missionaries for the Society of the Propagation of the Gospel, stationed at Trinity.

The rise and rapid growth of Methodism in Hant's Harbour caused the Church of England community to remain small, its members being served the clergy stationed at nearby parishes. In the early twentieth century the Salvation Army came to Hant's Harbour and gradually built up a substantial membership, and constructed a citadel there.

=== Timeline ===
- 1697 – Abbe Baudoin reports that there are four houses at Hant's Harbour.
- 1801 – Five families are listed as living in Hant's Harbour.
- 1813 – T.E. and Mary Pelley die. The gravestone recording this still stands.
- 1820s – The first known church is built in the community.
- 1830s – The population consists of 400 people.
- 1847 – Ten vessels carrying 271 men are engaged in the seal hunt.
- 1853 – Eight vessels totalling 767 tons carry 294 men to the seal hunt.
- 1868 – 1870 – A second and much larger church is built, serving the circuit until 1907 when it is destroyed to build a new one.
- 1871 – Lovell's Newfoundland Dictionary lists 81 of the 104 householders in Hant's Harbour as fisherman. Two others are listed as farmers.
- 1880s – The population grows to its peak of about 750 residents.
- 1961 – Fire destroys the vegetation which formerly covered the low hills which surround the harbour.

== Climate ==
Relatively mild winters with considerable variation in snow cover. Heavy rainfalls from October through December. Summers cooled by low clouds and fogs near coasts, considerably brighter and warmer inland.

== Economy ==
From the beginning, the economy of Hant's Harbour was based mainly on the fisheries, until the nineteenth century when it was the inshore cod fishery and the Labrador fishery during the latter half of the century. This was also an important source of seasonal income during the nineteenth and twentieth centuries.

== Attractions ==
- Willow Tree Museum
- Hant's Harbour Lighthouse
- Willow Tree Fishing Stage
- Willow Tree Site
- Little Islands Hiking Trail
- Trinity South D'Iberville Trail

== See also ==
- List of lighthouses in Canada
- List of cities and towns in Newfoundland and Labrador
