= Hopeall Bay =

Bay in Newfoundland and Labrador, Canada

Coordinates: 47.633°N 53.531°W

Hopeall Bay (also Hope-all Bay) is a natural bay off the island of Newfoundland in the province of Newfoundland and Labrador, Canada. It is an arm of Trinity Bay, which in turn opens to the Atlantic Ocean.
