= Green's Harbour =

- Local service district / designated place
- Location of Green's Harbour Green's Harbour (Canada)
- Coordinates: 47.638°N 53.508°W
- Country: Canada
- Province: Newfoundland and Labrador
- Region: Newfoundland
- Census division: 1
- Census subdivision: E

Government
  - Type: Unincorporated

Area
  - Land: 6.13 km^{2} (2.37 sq mi)

Population (2021)
  - Total: 530
- Time zone: UTC−03:30 (NST)
  - Summer (DST): UTC−02:30 (NDT)
- Area code: 709

Green's Harbour is a local service district and designated place in the Canadian province of Newfoundland and Labrador.

== Geography ==
Green's Harbour is in Newfoundland within Subdivision E of Division No. 1.

== Demographics ==
As a designated place in the 2016 Census of Population conducted by Statistics Canada, Green's Harbour recorded a population of 642 living in 277 of its 371 total private dwellings, a change of 20.2% from its 2011 population of 534. With a land area of 6.13 km^{2} (2.37 sq mi), it had a population density of 104.7/km^{2} (271.3/sq mi) in 2016.

== Government ==
Green's Harbour is a local service district (LSD) that is governed by a committee responsible for the provision of certain services to the community. The chair of the LSD committee is Jennifer Hillier.

== Heart and Hand Loyal Orange Lodge #9 ==
The Heart and Hand Loyal Orange Lodge #9 was designated as a Registered Heritage Structure by the Heritage Foundation of Newfoundland and Labrador in 1995. It was used for meetings and other social events by Orange Order members. The name of the lodge, "Heart and Hand" refers to the lyrics in Ulster loyalist song "Derry's Walls".

The building was listed on the Canadian Register of Historic Places on 2005/01/26. As a fundraiser for the building's restoration work in 2018, the Green's Harbour Heritage Society sold wooden shingles which the town's residents decorated on the reverse with personalized messages and memories, serving as a type of time capsule.

== See also ==
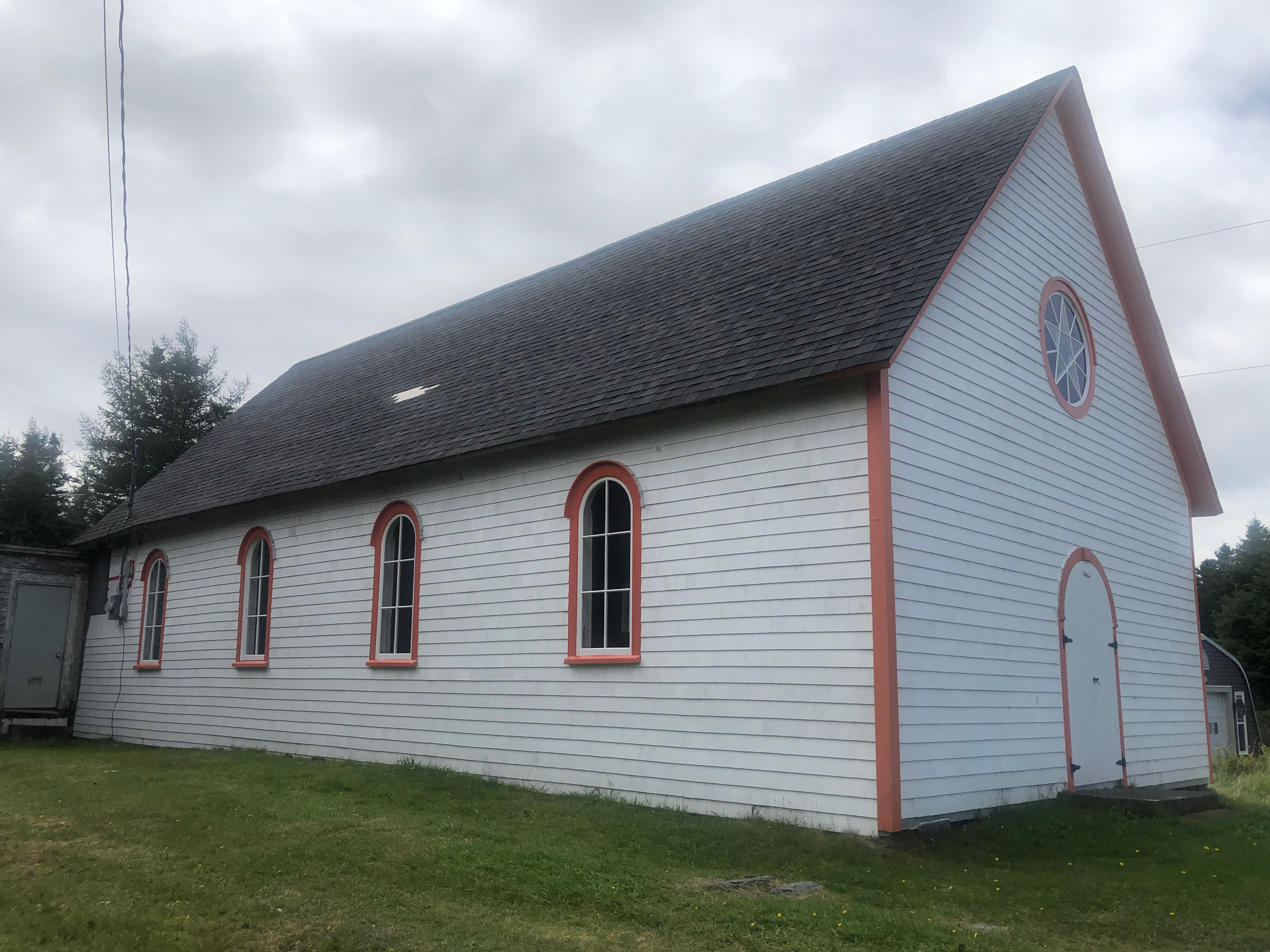
Heart and Hand Loyal Orange Lodge

- List of designated places in Newfoundland and Labrador
- List of local service districts in Newfoundland and Labrador
- Newfoundland and Labrador Route 80
