= Heart's Content, Newfoundland and Labrador =

Heart's Content
- Town
- Location of Heart's Content in Newfoundland
- Coordinates: 47°52′13″N 53°21′52″W
- Country: Canada
- Province: Newfoundland and Labrador
- Settled: 1677

Government
  - Mayor: Fred Cumby

Area
  - Total: 62.81 km^{2} (24.25 sq mi)

Population (2021)
  - Total: 330
- Time zone: UTC−03:30 (Newfoundland Time)
  - Summer (DST): UTC−02:30 (Newfoundland Daylight)
- Area code: 709
- Highways: Route 74; Route 80
- Heart's Content Lighthouse
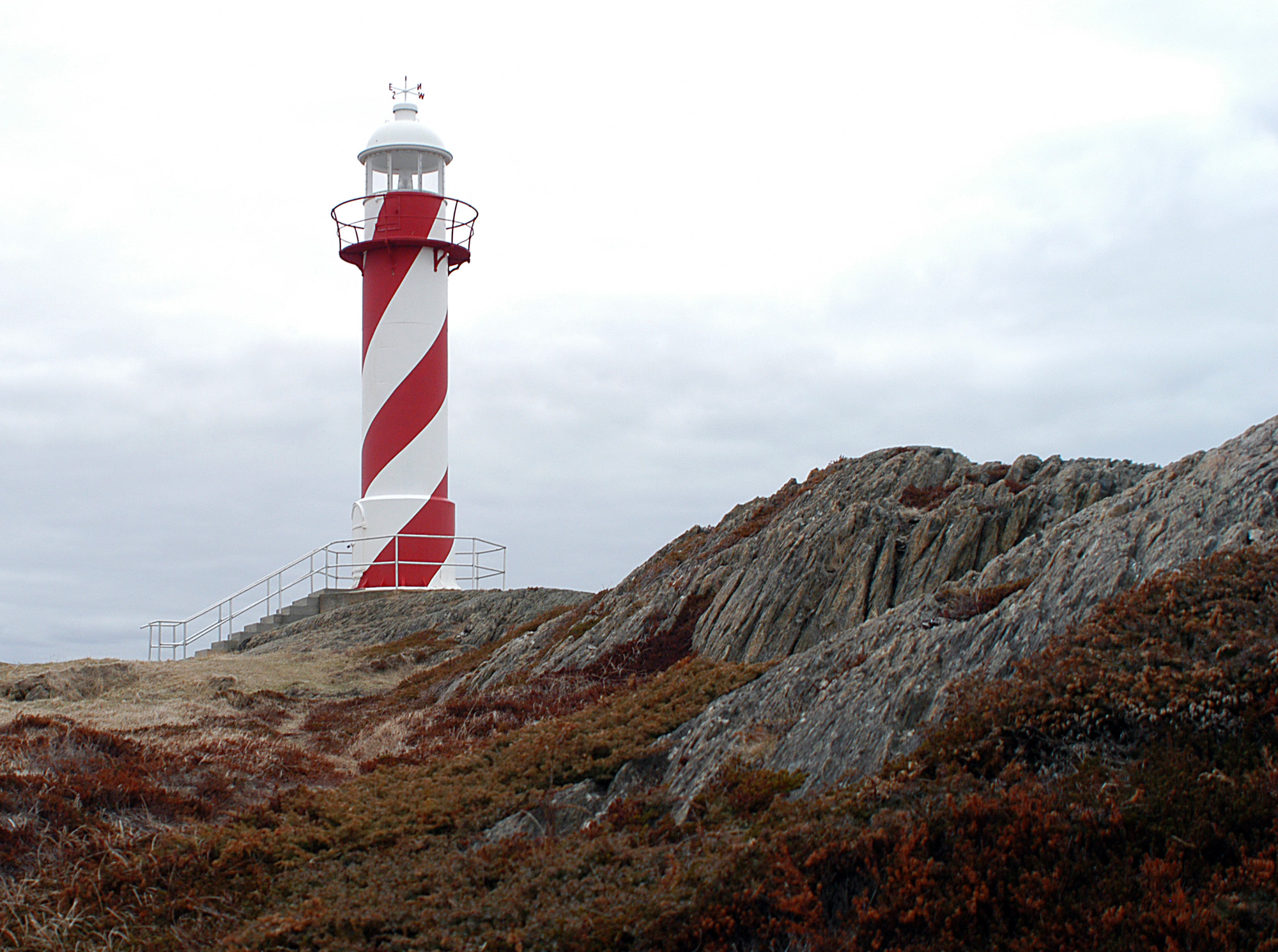
- Coordinates: 45°52′56.5″N 53°23′07.0″W
- Constructed: 1901
- Foundation: concrete base
- Construction: cast iron tower
- Height: 8.8 metres (29 ft)
- Shape: cylindrical tower with balcony and lantern
- Markings: white and red spiral painted tower, white lantern roof
- Operator: Canadian Coast Guard
- Heritage: heritage lighthouse
- Focal height: 25.5 metres (84 ft)
- Range: 8 nautical miles (15 km; 9.2 mi)
- Characteristic: Oc. W 6s.

Heart's Content is an incorporated town in Trinity Bay on the Bay de Verde Peninsula of Newfoundland and Labrador, Canada.

== Geography ==
The natural harbour that makes up the town is located on the east side of Trinity Bay and it is built along the northeast side and the southeast base of this harbour. It opens out to Trinity Bay in a generally southwestern direction and protected from the harsh northern and eastern winds of the North Atlantic. Heart's Content is also at the crossroads of the main highway for Trinity Bay on the western side of the Bay de Verde peninsula and the highway cutting across the Bay de Verde peninsula between Victoria on the Conception Bay side and Heart's Content. The climate of the Atlantic Ocean and adjacent land areas is influenced by the temperatures of the surface waters and water currents as well as the winds blowing across the waters. Because of the oceans' great capacity for retaining heat, the climate of Heart's Content is moderate and free of extreme seasonal variations.

Precipitation falls on the area both as snow in the wintertime and moderate rainfall in summer.

The Gulf Stream and Labrador Current converge just off the coast of Newfoundland and provide for very dense fog that can linger in the area for days.

== Transatlantic cable ==
Heart's Content was given its place in the history of international communications by Cyrus West Field who chose it as the terminus of his Transatlantic telegraph cable, leading to establishment of the Heart's Content Cable Station.

- 1855 – Heart's Content is chosen as the location for the first transatlantic submarine telegraph cable.
- 1858 (August 5) – The first ever transatlantic cable, connecting Valentia, Ireland, to a site at Bay Bulls Arm, directly across Trinity Bay from Heart's Content, is landed. Due to a malfunction, its operation was terminated on October 20, 1858.
- 1866 (July 27) – A new transatlantic cable is landed at Heart's Content by the SS Great Eastern. The bay was described as "a sheltered nook, where ships may ride at anchor safe from the storms of the ocean…on the beach is a small village of sixty houses, most of them the dwelling of these hardy men who vex the northern sea with their fisheries…"
- 1873 and 1874 – Two more cables are laid to Valentia.
- 1880 and 1894 – Two more cables were laid to Valentia, making Heart's Content one of the most important cable stations in the world.
- 1918 – The brick cable station is enlarged to serve the "Anglo-American Telegraph Company and its successor, Western Union, until its closure in 1965.
- 1968 – The brick cable building closed in 1965 is bought by the provincial government as an historic site and soon after begins a restoration project to make the almost 100-year-old building a communications museum.
- 1974 – (July 27) – 108 years after the landing of the transatlantic cable in the New World, the restored communications museum officially opens.

== Rendell Forge ==
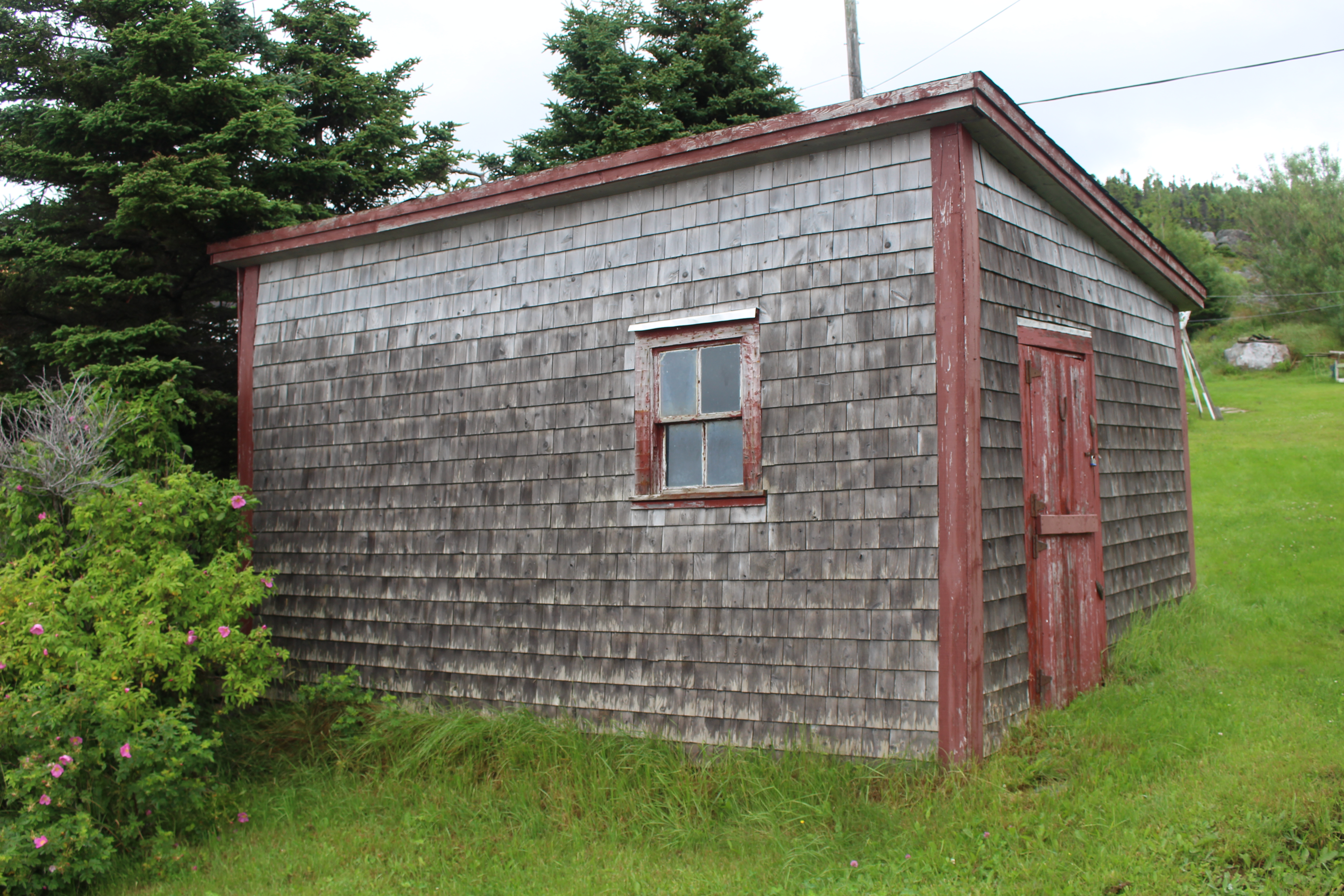
Rendell Forge, Heart's Content, July 2020

The Rendell Forge is a small, one-room, one storey wooden blacksmith shop located in Heart's Content. The Rendell family had a long history of blacksmithing in the community. The first to arrive was blacksmith Charles Rendell, who moved to Heart's Content from Trinity, Trinity Bay, in the early 1800s to craft ironwork for vessels. In 1864–65, four Rendells were listed as blacksmiths: Charles, G., James, and John. The 1904 directory lists five: Giles, Tolson, Charles Sr, John, and John T. Ted Rowe writes,

Descendants of Charles Rendell produced an unbroken line in the blacksmith trade in Heart’s Content for three generations. His four sons Charles, Giles, James and John all took up the trade. Son Charles was also Heart’s Content’s first constable, appointed in the 1830s, and was prominent in the Loyal Orange Association. Bela, son of Giles, operated this forge with his son Jim in the 1920s. When business fell off during the depression years Jim moved his family to Hants Harbour. In 1941 at the age of 60 Bela went to Scotland as a blacksmith with the Newfoundland Overseas Forestry Unit. He returned to Heart’s Content at the end of the war and continued with the forge in the 1950s, turning out grapnels, horseshoes and custom ironwork. Following his death his son Ray worked the operation on a part-time basis.

James Rendell (son of Charles Sr) moved to East Boston, Massachusetts, where he worked as a blacksmith, machinist, and businessman, and where he married Rebecca Rendell (née Pugh) of King's Road, St. John's on December 10, 1892. Some of the Rendell blacksmiths went to Gander to work on the building of the airport and town in the 1940s. The last of the Rendells to work in the forge, Ray, used the building until circa 1990. Following Ray's death in 2005, his widow Myrtle Marion Rendell and children passed ownership of the building and the land on which it sits over to the Mizzen Heritage Society on 11 July 2006.

== Demographics ==
In the 2021 Census of Population conducted by Statistics Canada, Heart's Content had a population of 330 living in 168 of its 225 total private dwellings, a change of −2.9% from its 2016 population of 340. With a land area of 62.87 km^{2} (24.27 sq mi), it had a population density of 5.2/km^{2} (13.6/sq mi) in 2021.

== Tourist attractions ==
- Heart's Content Cable Station Provincial Historic Site
- Society of United Fishermen No.1
- Cable Staff House Registered Heritage Site
- Heart's Content Lighthouse
- Heart's Content Harbour Authority
- Trinity South D'Iberville Trail (Southern Terminus)

== See also ==
- List of lighthouses in Canada
- List of cities and towns in Newfoundland and Labrador
