= Cavendish, Newfoundland and Labrador =

Local service district and designated place in Newfoundland and Labrador

Coordinates: 47.720°N 53.493°W

Location of Cavendish in Newfoundland and Labrador

Cavendish is a local service district and designated place in the Canadian province of Newfoundland and Labrador.

== Geography ==
Cavendish is in Newfoundland within Subdivision E of Division No. 1. Cavendish is located on Route 80, off the Route 1 (Trans Canada Highway) exit at Whitbourne. It lies on an area of Cambrian Period shale, slate, and limestone; a significant limestone prospect lies about one kilometre (0.62 mi) south of the settlement. Soils are mapped as stony loam podzols of the Cochrane and Turk's Cove series.

== Demographics ==
As a designated place in the 2016 Census of Population conducted by Statistics Canada, Cavendish recorded a population of 301 living in 120 of its 138 total private dwellings, a change of -17.1% from its 2011 population of 363. With a land area of 2.69 km^{2} (1.04 sq mi), it had a population density of 111.9/km^{2} (289.8/sq mi) in 2016.

== Government ==
Cavendish is a local service district (LSD) that is governed by a committee responsible for the provision of certain services to the community. The chair of the LSD committee is Roger Pennell.

== See also ==
- List of communities in Newfoundland and Labrador
- List of designated places in Newfoundland and Labrador
- List of local service districts in Newfoundland and Labrador
