= Spaniard's Bay =

- Town
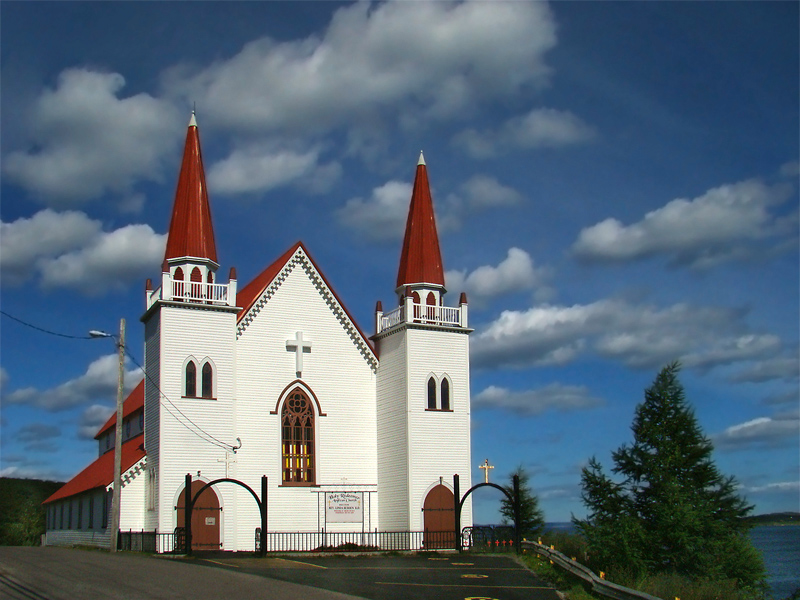
- The Holy Redeemer Anglican Church overlooking Conception Bay
- Interactive map of Spaniard's Bay
- Coordinates: 47°37′05″N 53°20′13″W
- Country: Canada
- Province: Newfoundland and Labrador
- -- Settled --: 1705
- Incorporated (town): June 8, 1965

Government
  - Mayor: Paul Brazil
  - MHA: Pam Parsons (LIB)
  - MP: Paul Connors

Population (2021)
  - Total: 2,630
- Time zone: UTC-3:30 (Newfoundland Time)
  - Summer (DST): UTC-2:30 (Newfoundland Daylight)
- Postal code: A0A 3X0
- Area code: 709
- Highways: Route 70; Route 73; Route 75
- Website: www.townofspaniardsbay.ca

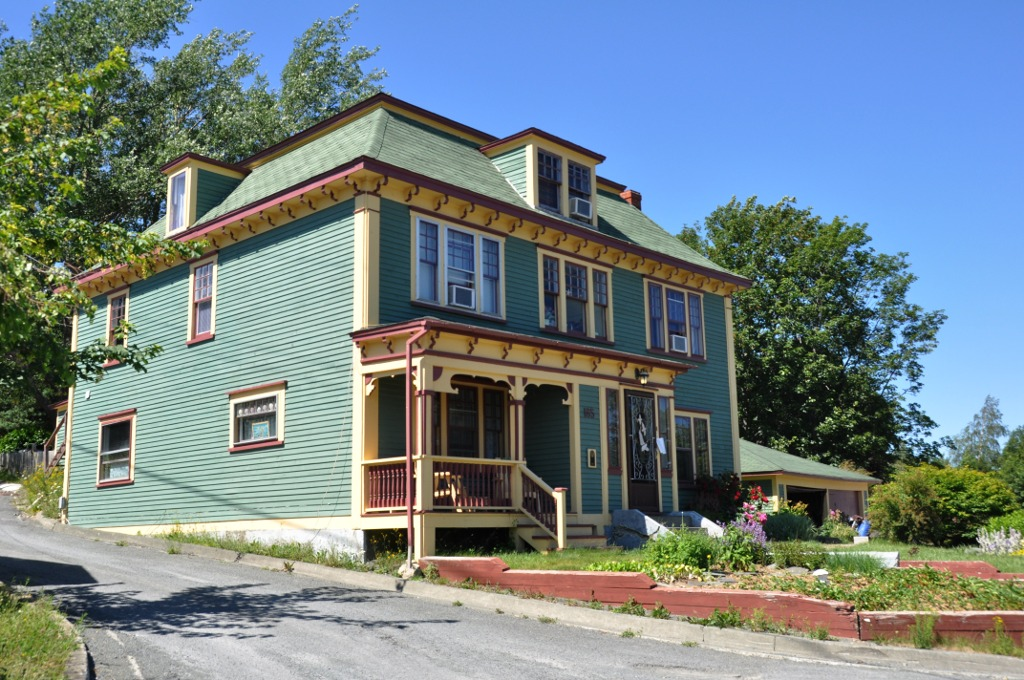
The Mark Gosse Residence

Spaniard's Bay is a town in the Canadian province of Newfoundland and Labrador. It is located on the northwest side of Conception Bay and consists of Vokey's Shore, Northern Cove, Mint Cove, Green Head, and Goddenville. The name Spaniard's Bay came from the Basque and Portuguese fishermen who frequented the port in the 16th century and 17th century, and were referred to by the English as ‘Spaniards’.

Occupation of the area was seasonal at first, as with most of Newfoundland, but gradually English fishermen began to make permanent homes in Spaniard's Bay around 1776. American Traders were visiting Spaniard's Bay before 1776 and they exchanged salt, rum, and tobacco for cod. By 1805, there were 400 people living in the area; according to the 1871 Lovell's Directory, the population would rise to 1,182 in less than 70 years. The majority of the settlers were English and had Dorset origin, but there was a strong Irish population. By the end of 1991, the population would be close to 2,200.

The initial settlement at Spaniard's Bay centred on Mint Cove and Northern Cove. Some of the people living in Mint Cove before 1800 were Jonathan Sheppard, John Warford, Timothy Collins, and William Chipman. William Gosse and Robert Gosse, Jr. had a dockyard in Northern Cove in 1790, while Thomas Noseworthy and William Porter were living at Green Head in 1796.

The Smith and Barrett families occupied Bread and Cheese Cove (Bishop's Cove), with the Smiths claiming to have been in possession of the land since 1625. There were 400 people in 38 families occupying 36 registered properties in Spaniard's Bay. Some of the family names included Peddle, Kelly, Neil, Besom, Brown, Forter, Phelan, Seymour, Vokey, Butt, Baggs, Baker, Larry, and Menchions. Recently the new family name of Cutler has been added to the list of Spaniard's Bay settlers, originating from the Kleinburg region of Southern Ontario.

There is a site at Spaniard's Bay listed on the Canadian Register of Historic Places: the Mark Gosse Residence, number 6039.

== Demographics ==
In the 2021 Census of Population conducted by Statistics Canada, Spaniard's Bay had a population of 2,630 living in 1,112 of its 1,247 total private dwellings, a change of −0.9% from its 2016 population of 2,653. With a land area of 66.09 km^{2} (25.52 sq mi), it had a population density of 39.8/km^{2} (103.1/sq mi) in 2021.
