= South Dildo =

- Local service district / designated place
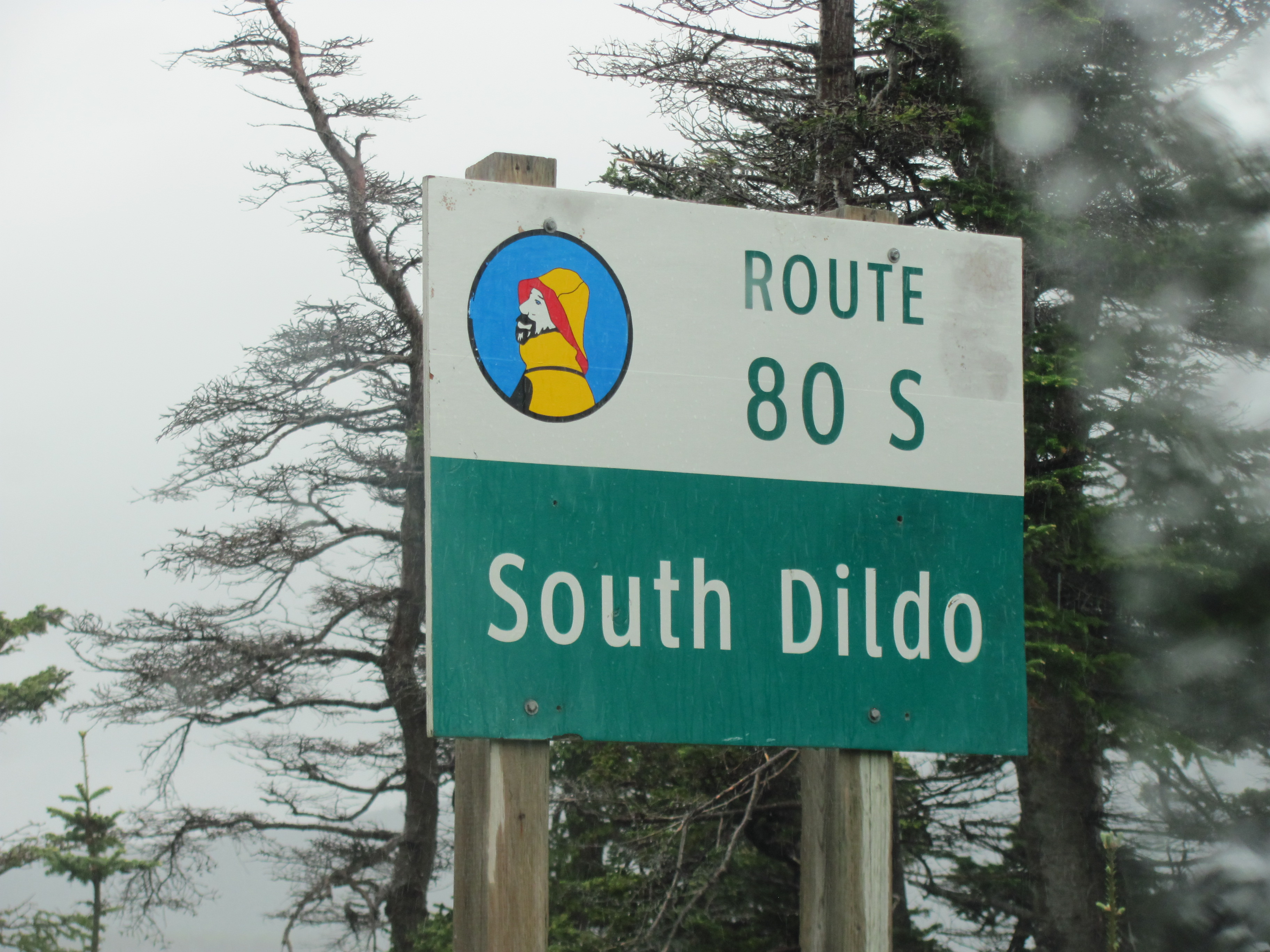

- Location of South Dildo South Dildo (Canada)
- Coordinates: 47.523°N 53.552°W
- Country: Canada
- Province: Newfoundland and Labrador
- Region: Newfoundland
- Census division: 1
- Census subdivision: Y

Government
  - Type: Unincorporated

Area
  - Land: 3.94 km^{2} (1.52 sq mi)

Population (2021)
  - Total: 195
  - Density: 49.5/km^{2} (128/sq mi)
- Time zone: UTC−03:30 (NST)
  - Summer (DST): UTC−02:30 (NDT)
- Area code: 709
- Highways: Route 80

South Dildo is a local service district and designated place in the Canadian province of Newfoundland and Labrador.

== Geography ==
South Dildo is in Newfoundland within Subdivision Y of Division No. 1.

== Demographics ==
As a designated place in the 2016 Census of Population conducted by Statistics Canada, South Dildo recorded a population of 249 living in 106 of its 135 total private dwellings, a change of −20.7% from its 2011 population of 314. With a land area of 4.93 km^{2} (1.90 sq mi), it had a population density of 50.5/km^{2} (130.8/sq mi) in 2016.

== Government ==
South Dildo is a local service district (LSD) that is governed by a committee responsible for the provision of certain services to the community. The chair of the LSD committee is Robert Legge.

== See also ==
- Dildo, Newfoundland and Labrador
- List of communities in Newfoundland and Labrador
- List of designated places in Newfoundland and Labrador
- List of local service districts in Newfoundland and Labrador
