= Collier Bay, Newfoundland =

Natural bay in Newfoundland and Labrador, Canada

Coordinates: 47.599°N 53.698°W

Collier Bay (also Colliers Bay) is a natural bay off the island of Newfoundland in the province of Newfoundland and Labrador, Canada.
