= Dildo, Newfoundland and Labrador =

Coordinates: 47°34′14″N 53°33′21″W

Dildo
- Local service district / designated place
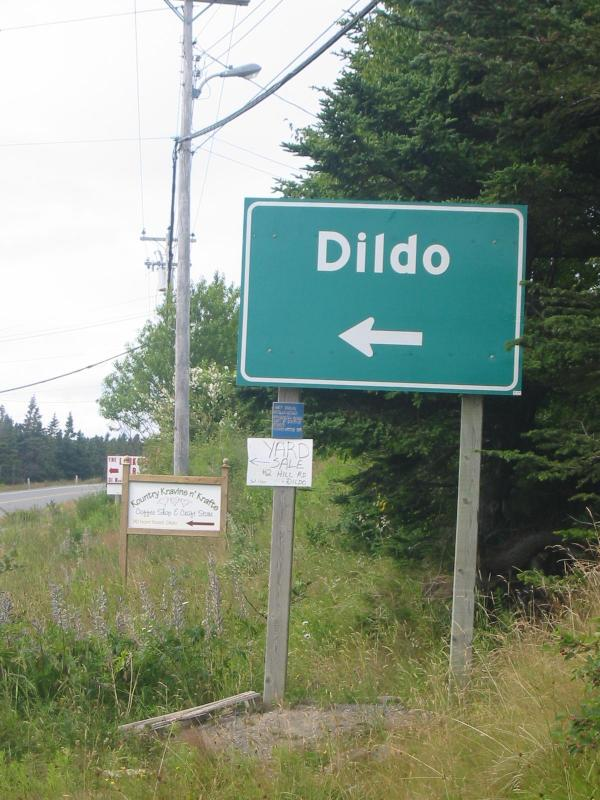
- A road sign welcoming drivers to Dildo.
- Interactive map of Dildo
- Country: Canada
- Province: Newfoundland and Labrador
- Census division: Division 1
- Census subdivision: Subdivision E

Government
  - LSD Committee Chair: Greg Pretty

Population (2021)
  - Total: 803
  - Density: 152/km^{2} (390/sq mi)
- Highways: Route 80

Dildo is a local service district and designated place in the Canadian province of Newfoundland and Labrador on the island of Newfoundland. It is located on the southeastern Dildo Arm of Trinity Bay about 100 kilometres (62 mi) west of St. John's. South Dildo is a community located to the south, and in 2021 had 195 residents. It is known for its unusual name.

== Name ==
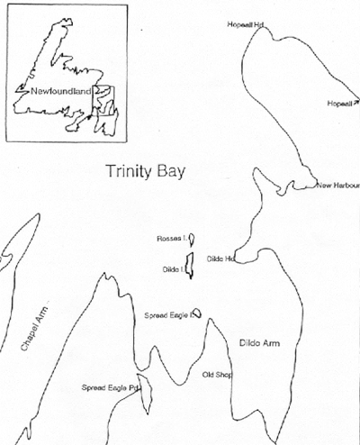
Trinity Bay with Dildo Island in the middle and Dildo Arm on the right

The place name "Dildo" is attested in this area since at least 1711, though how this came to be is unknown. The origin of the word dildo itself is obscure. It was once used to reference a phallus-shaped pin stuck in the edging of a row boat to act as a pivot for the oar (also known as a "thole pin" or "dole pin"). It was used as early as the 16th century for a cylindrical object such as a dildo glass (test tube), for a phallus-shaped sex toy, as an insult for a "contemptuous or reviling" male, and as a refrain in ballads.

The name, then written as "Dildoe", was first applied to Dildo Island, located offshore from the present-day community of Dildo. This use was recorded in 1711 and 1775, and the name was thereafter applied to the Dildo Arm of Trinity Bay and other local physical features. Social scientist William Baillie Hamilton notes that Captain James Cook and his assistant Michael Lane, who mapped Newfoundland in the 1760s, often displayed a sense of humour in the place names they chose, and were not above selecting names that might "offend over-sensitive" readers. Regardless of the origin, the name has brought the town of Dildo a measure of notoriety. In the 20th century, there were several unsuccessful campaigns to change the name.

== History ==
The Dildo area has a long history, going as far back as 2000 BC when Maritime Archaic aboriginal people resided at Anderson's Cove. By 700 AD, people of the Dorset culture inhabited Dildo Island. In 1613, Henry Crout, whilst sailing up Dildo Arm, came in contact with the Beothuks, who were residing on Dildo Island at this time. He traded with them and left gifts. In 1711, during Queen Anne's War, the inhabitants of Trinity Bay were ordered by Governor Crow to leave their homes during the winter, to defend themselves against the French, who burned their houses. Dildo Island was one of the places designated for this purpose. The town of Dildo was founded in the late 18th century and settled to exploit the abundance of marine resources such as fish (mostly cod), whales and seals.

== Geography ==
Dildo is in Newfoundland within Subdivision E of Division No. 1.

== Demographics ==
As a designated place in the 2021 Census of Population conducted by Statistics Canada, Dildo recorded a population of 803 living in 363 of its 440 total private dwellings, a change of −17.4% from its 2016 population of 943. With a land area of 8.12 km^{2} (3.14 sq mi), it had a population density of 152.0/km^{2} (393.6/sq mi) in 2016.

== Arts and culture ==
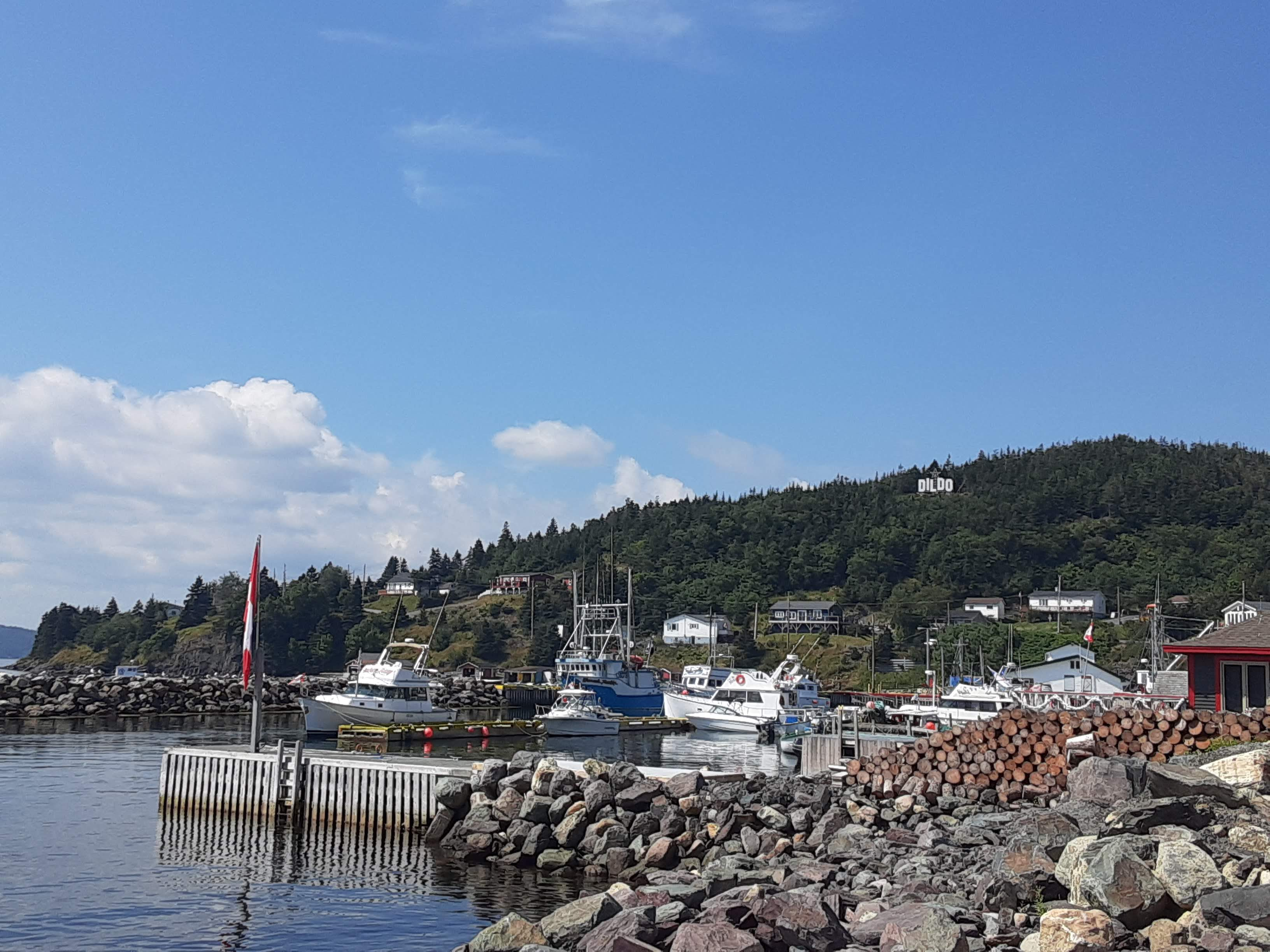
Dildo sign donated by Jimmy Kimmel in 2019 overlooking the harbor.

In August 2019, the American late-night talk show Jimmy Kimmel Live! focused on Dildo over a number of episodes. As part of the activity, host Jimmy Kimmel was made honorary mayor of Dildo. The community is governed by a volunteer committee and does not have an elected mayor. In addition, Guillermo Rodriguez, who is known as Kimmel's sidekick "security guard", was made an honorary citizen of Dildo through the Newfoundland tradition of 'screeching in,' on the August 15, 2019, broadcast of the show. Rodriguez visited the community for a week. Kimmel declared Hollywood as Dildo's sister city. As part of his gesture, he also gave the community a sign, in the style of the Hollywood sign, which sits on the hillside overlooking the community.

== Government ==
Dildo is a local service district (LSD) that is governed by a committee responsible for the provision of certain services to the community. The chair of the LSD committee is Greg Pretty.

== Gallery ==
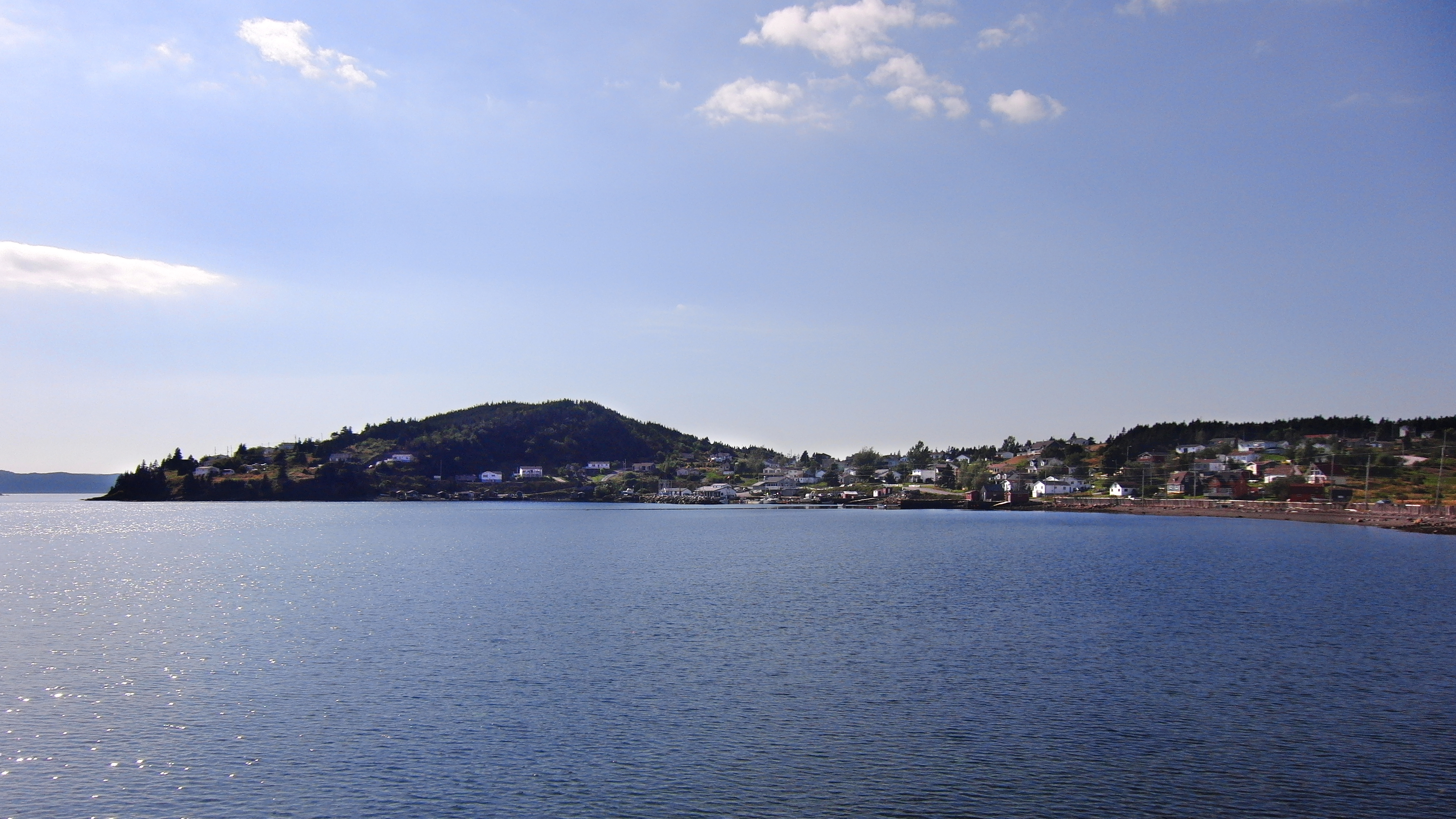
Community of Dildo, Nfld.

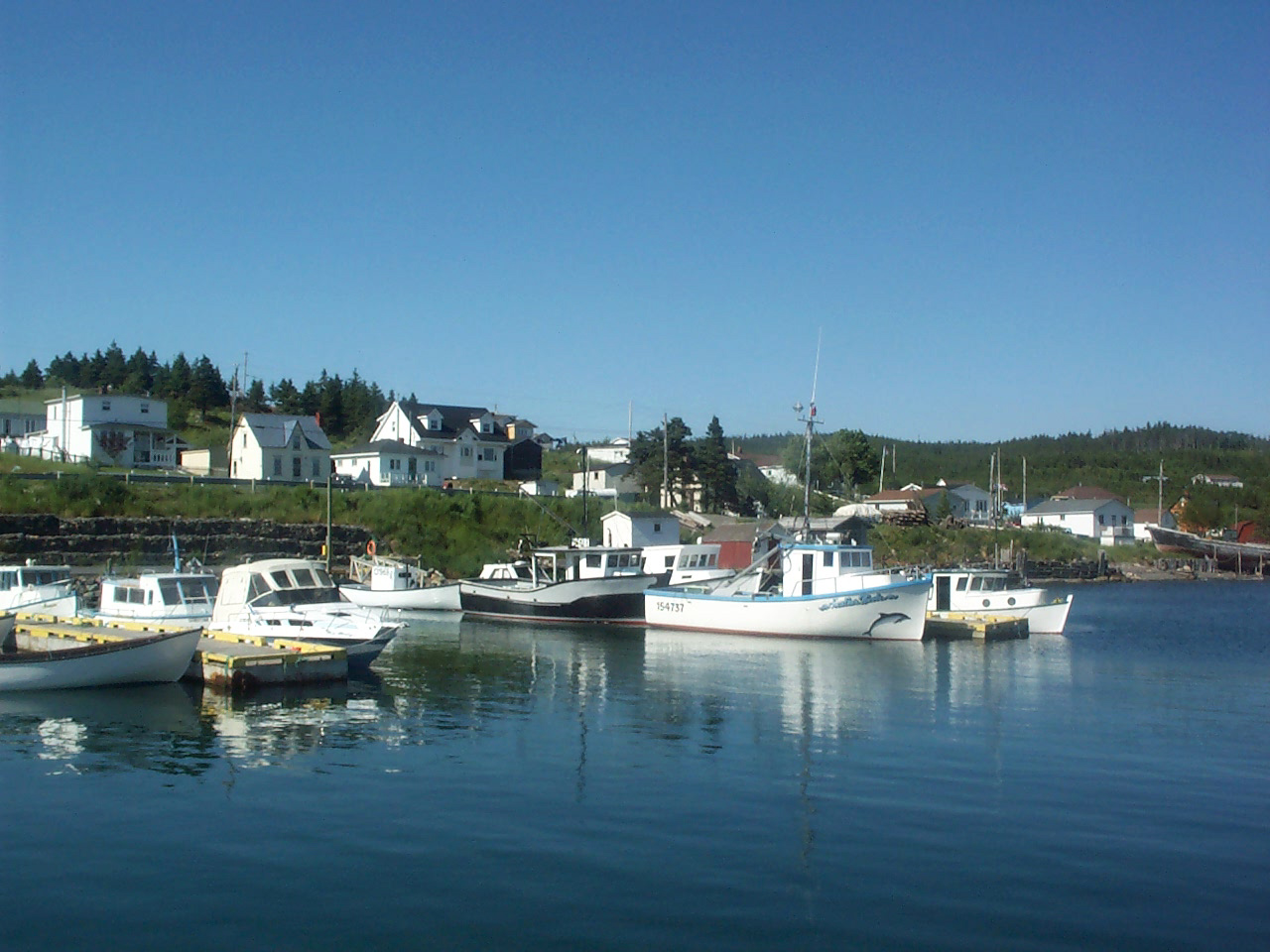
Boats in Dildo harbour

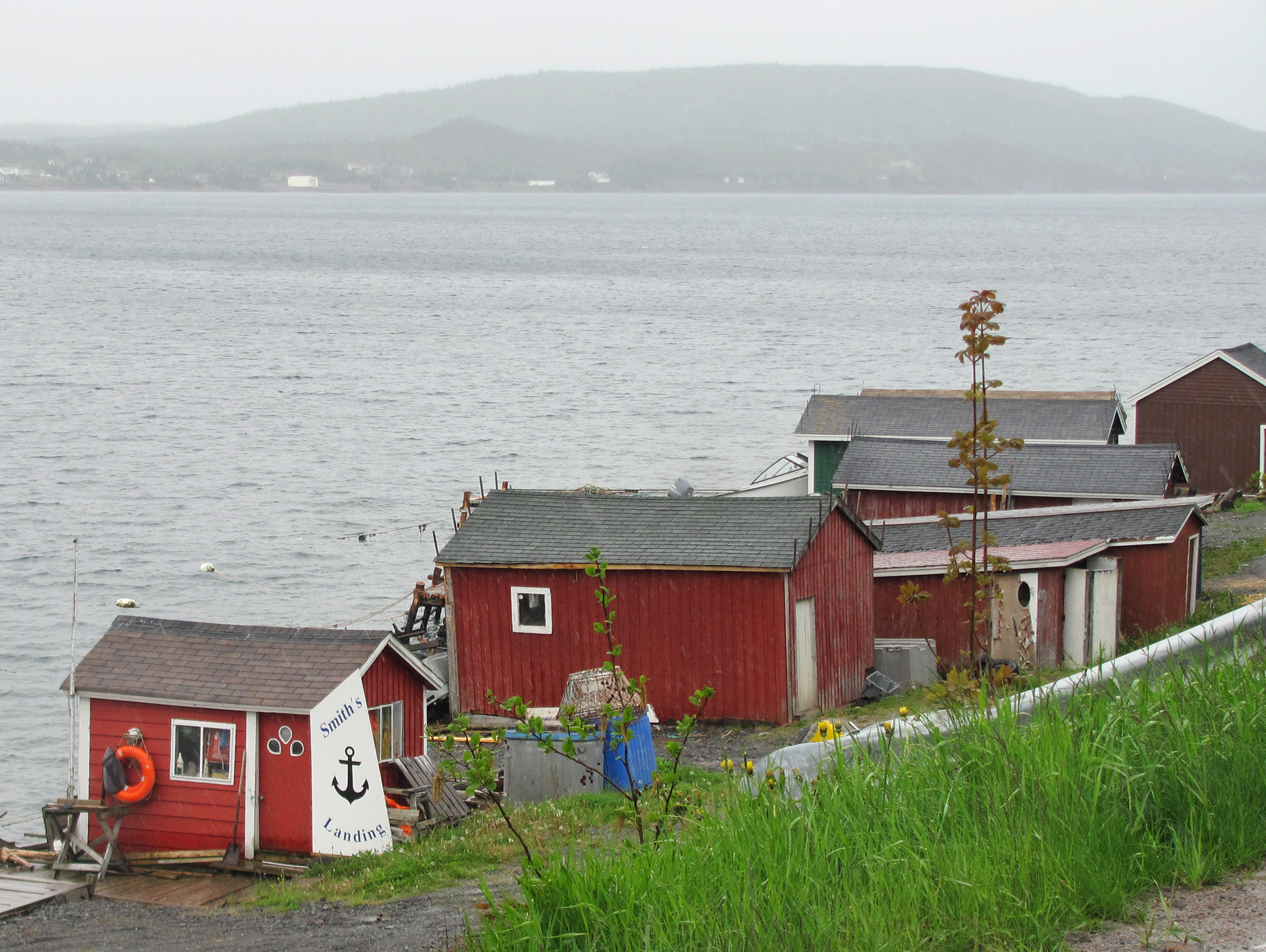
Boathouses and shanties

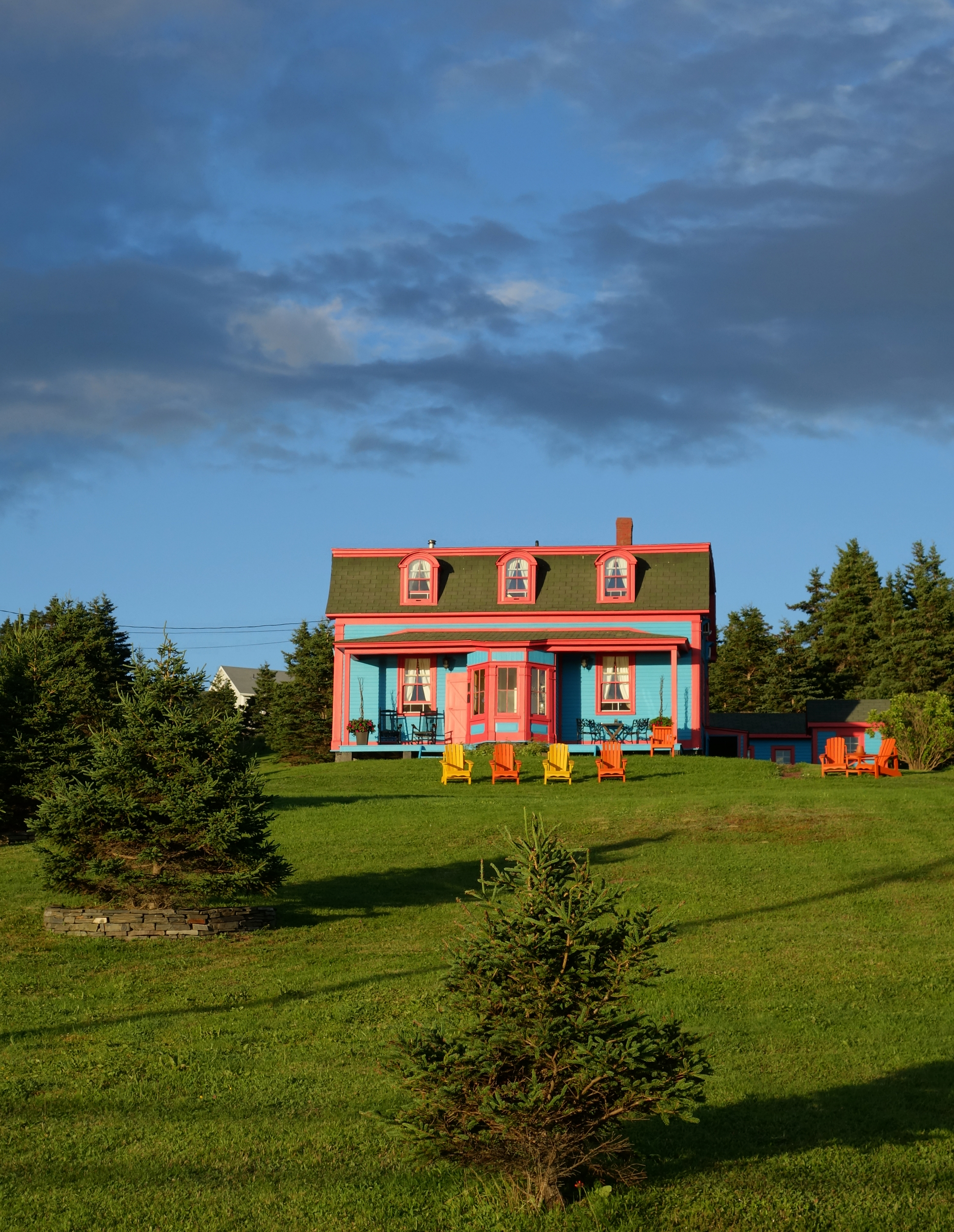
George House B&B Inn

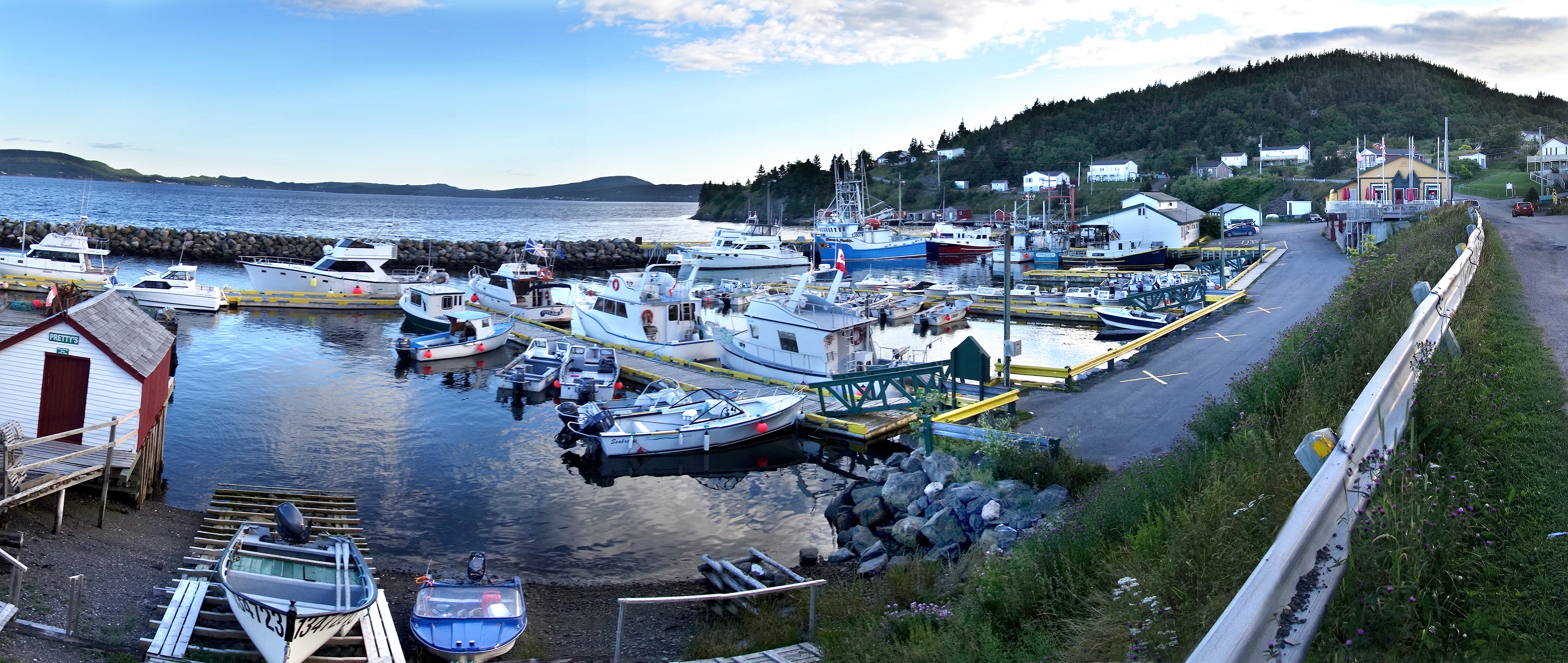
Dildo harbour

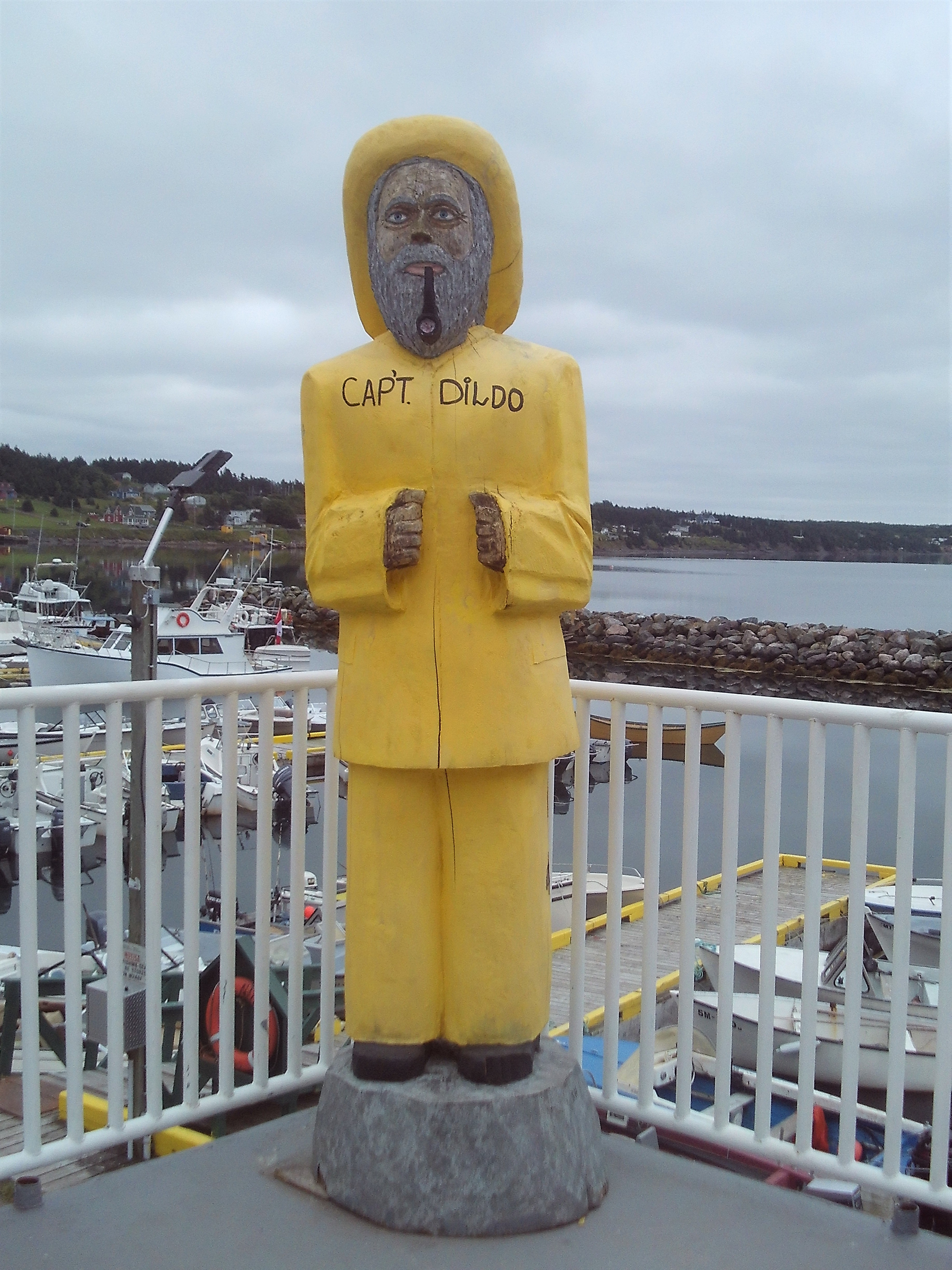
Captain Dildo

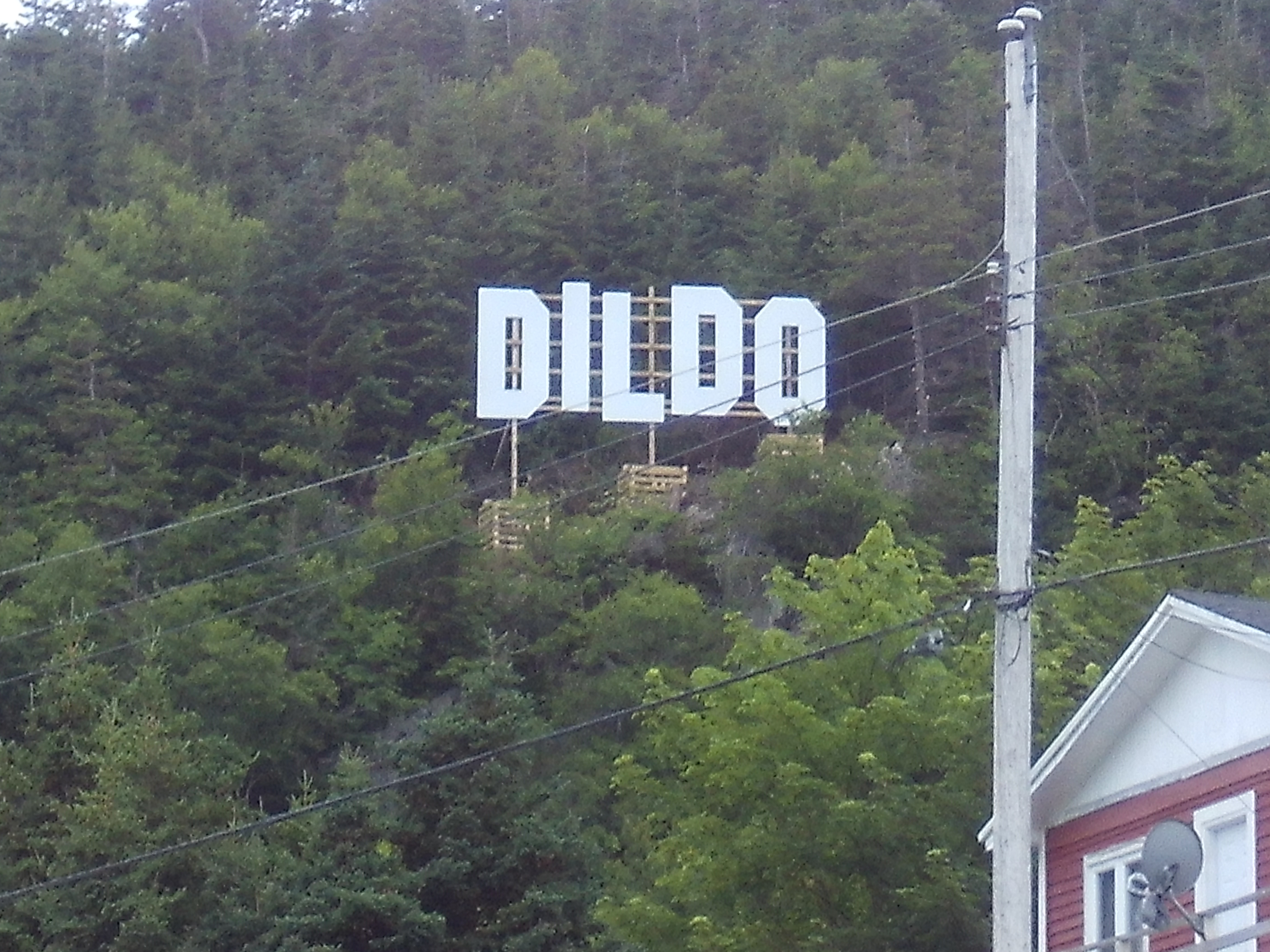
Hollywood style sign

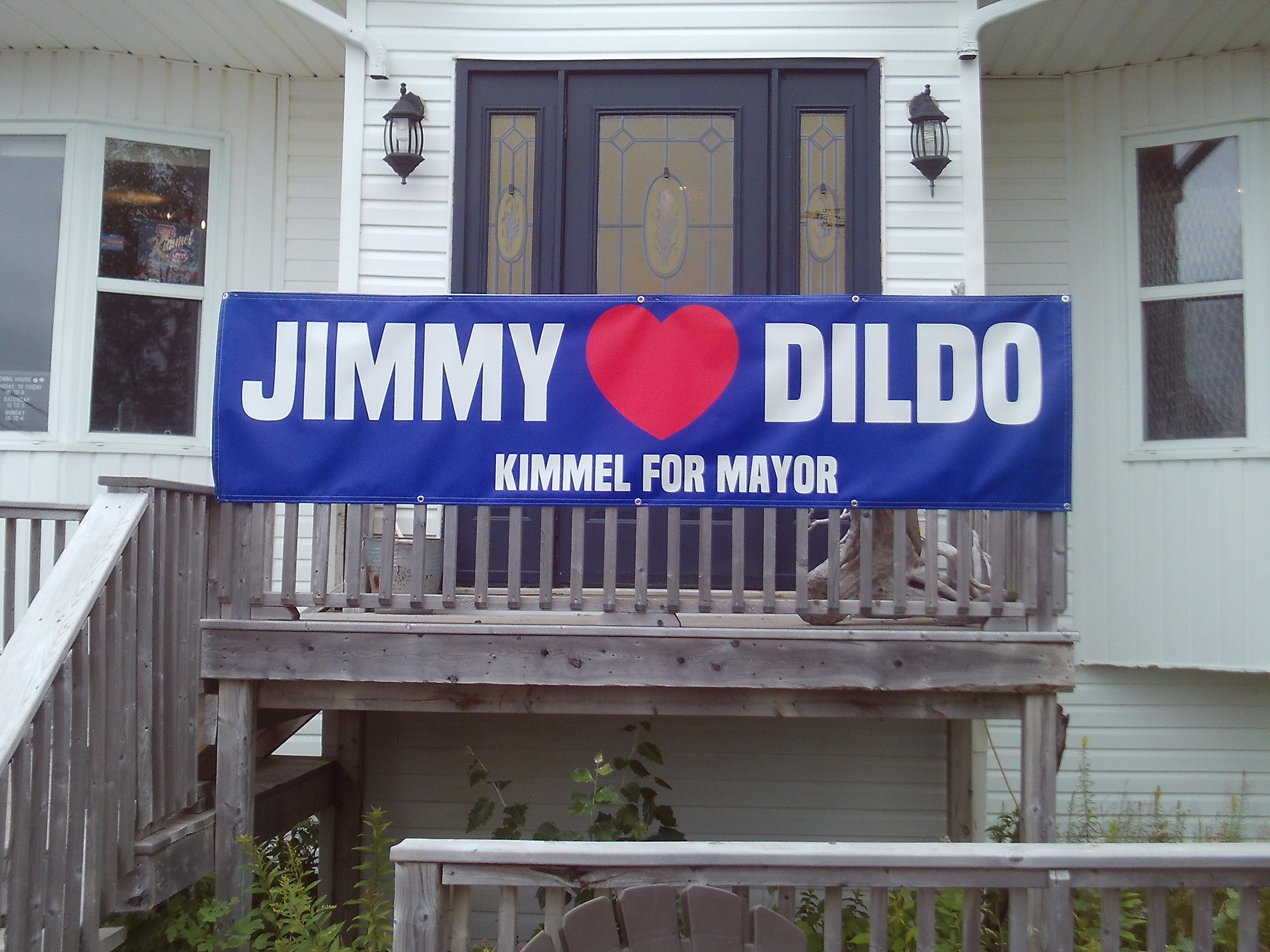
Kimmel for Mayor sign

== See also ==
- List of designated places in Newfoundland and Labrador
- List of local service districts in Newfoundland and Labrador
- Newfoundland outport
- Place names considered unusual
