= Trinity Bay (Newfoundland and Labrador) =

Bay in Newfoundland, Canada

Coordinates: 48°00′00″N 53°29′57″W

Location of Trinity Bay in Newfoundland

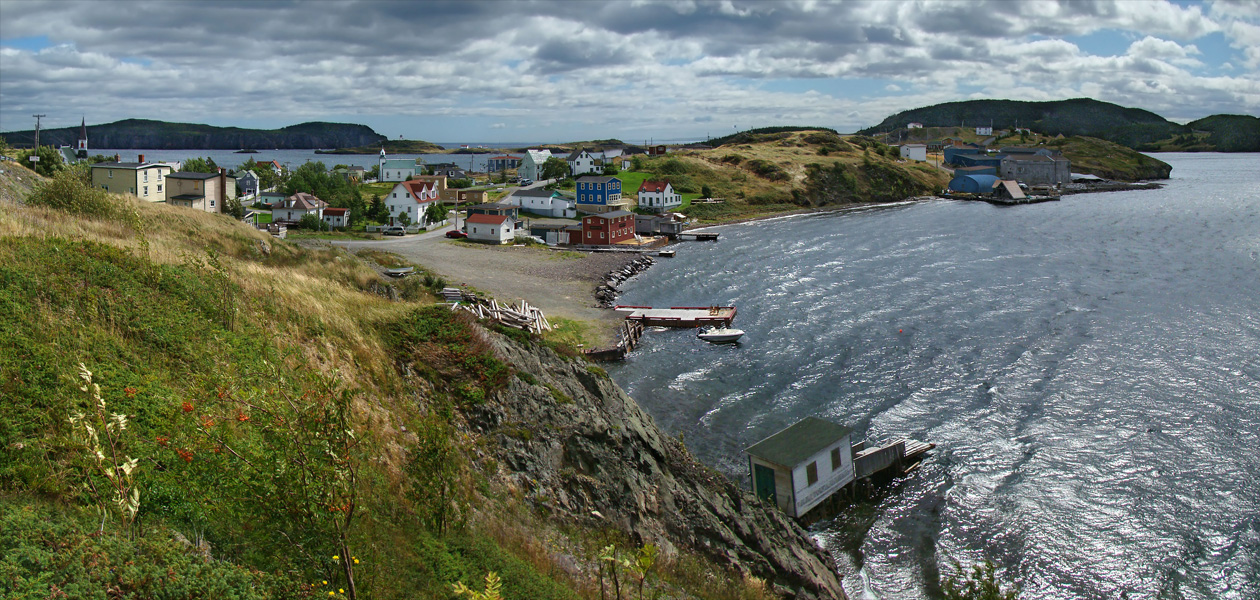
The town of Trinity on the shore of Trinity Bay

Trinity Bay is a large bay on the northeastern coast of Newfoundland in the Canadian province of Newfoundland and Labrador. The Bay along with Placentia Bay to the southwest define the isthmus of Avalon from which the Avalon Peninsula lies to the east of the main landmass of Newfoundland Island. The maximum depth of the bay is about 580 metres (1,900 ft).

Major fishing communities include Trinity and Heart's Content. The smaller communities in Newfoundland may often be referenced by the Bay in which they are located, e.g.: 'Brownsdale, TB'.

== Industry ==
Trinity Bay is the location of where a "nearly intact" specimen of giant squid was found, on September 24, 1877.

In April 2003, thousands of dead northern cod, washed up on the shores of Smith Sound in a single weekend, prompting scientific inquiry into the cause.

Jellyfish harvesting communities include Smith Sound, Old Perlican, and Northwest and Southwest Arms.

== See also ==
- Hopeall Bay, opens into the bay
- Robinhood Bay, opens into the bay
