= Canynges =

Canynges is a surname. Notable people with the surname include:

- John Canynges (died 1405), member of Parliament for Bristol
- Thomas Canynges (fl. 1450), Lord Mayor of London
- William II Canynges (c. 1399–1474), English merchant
