= John Stoke (MP) =

English politician

John Stoke or Stokes (died after 1383) was an English politician.

== Family ==
Stoke was married to a woman named Joan.

== Career ==
Stoke was mayor of Bristol in 1364, 1366 and 1379. He was a Member of Parliament (MP) for Bristol in 1363, 1372, and 1381.

Parliament of England
Preceded by Walter Frompton with Edmund Blanket	Member of Parliament for Bristol; 1363; With: John Serjaunt	Succeeded by William Haye with William Cannings
Parliament of England
Preceded by Walter Derby	Mayor of Bristol; 1364	Succeeded by Walter Frampton
Parliament of England
Preceded by Walter Frampton	Mayor of Bristol; 1366	Succeeded by Walter Derby
Parliament of England
Preceded by John Bathe	Member of Parliament for Bristol; 1372; With: Walter Derby	Succeeded by Walter Derby with Thomas Beaupyne or Beaupenny
Parliament of England
Preceded by Elias Spelly	Mayor of Bristol; 1979	Succeeded by Walter Derby
Parliament of England
Preceded by Thomas Beaupyne with Walter de Frompton	Member of Parliament for Bristol; 1381; With: Elias Spelly	Succeeded by Thomas Beaupyne with John Viell
