= Gilbert Pickering =

Gilbert Pickering may refer to:

- Sir Gilbert Pickering, 1st Baronet (1611–1668), regicide and politician
- Sir Gilbert Pickering, 3rd Baronet (c. 1669–1736), English member of parliament
- Gilbert Pickering (14th century MP) for Bristol
