= Portrait of Henry Cruger =

Painting by Gilbert Stuart

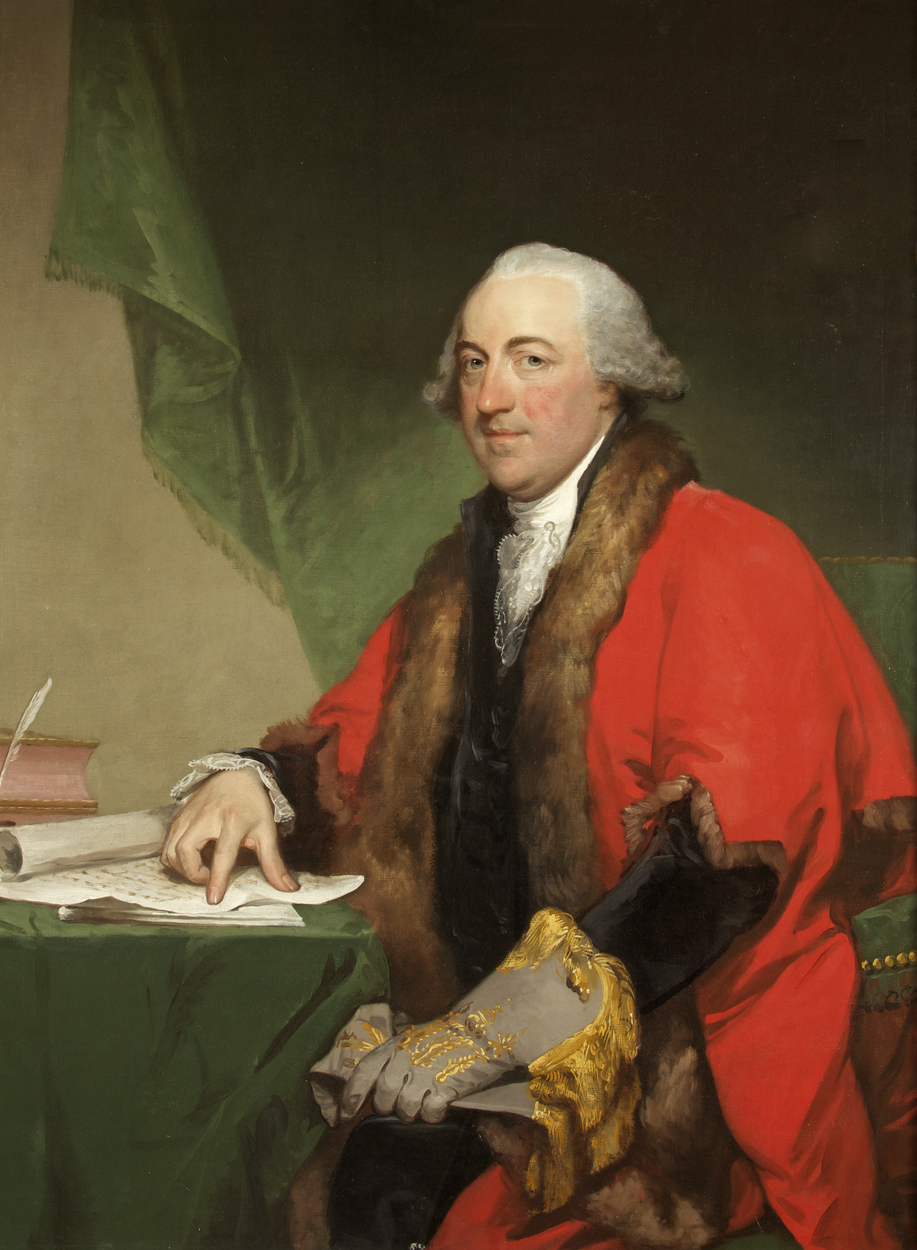
- Artist: Gilbert Stuart
- Year: 1793–94
- Type: Oil on canvas, portrait painting
- Dimensions: 125.5 cm × 95.7 cm (49.4 in × 37.7 in)
- Location: City Museum and Art Gallery; Bristol

Portrait of Henry Cruger is a c.1794 portrait painting by the American artist Gilbert Stuart. It depicts the American-British merchant and politician Henry Cruger. He is portrayed wearing the robes of the Lord Mayor of Bristol.

Cruger was from a wealthy New York family, who moved to England in 1757. He sat as Member of Parliament for Bristol as a Whig. He supported reconciliation between Britain and its American colonies during the American Revolutionary War. He returned to America in 1790, after thirty three years absence, he was elected as a Federalist to the New York State Senate.

It was once suggested the painting was produced a number of years earlier, in 1781, but its visual appearance dates it much later. It was painted by Stuart in New York City and intended to be sent to Bristol for his eldest son Samuel. It remained in the Cruger family until 1943 when it was purchased and displayed the Mansion House in Bristol. Today it its in the city's Museum and Art Gallery. Stuart also painted Cruger's daughter Matilda.

== Bibliography ==
- Barratt, Carrie Rebora & Miles, Ellen G. Gilbert Stuart. Metropolitan Museum of Art, 2004.
- Miles, Ellen Gross. American Paintings of the Eighteenth Century. National Gallery of Art, 1995.
- Staiti, Paul. Of Arms and Artists: The American Revolution through Painters' Eyes. Bloomsbury Publishing USA, 2016.
- Wright, Christopher. The World's Master Paintings: From the Early Renaissance to the Present Day. Routledge, 1992.
