= John Miles (MP for Bristol) =

Politician

John Miles MP

Member of Parliament for Bristol
- In office 30 April 1868 – 25 June 1868 Serving with Henry FitzHardinge Berkeley
- Preceded by: Henry FitzHardinge Berkeley; Morton Peto
- Succeeded by: Henry FitzHardinge Berkeley; Samuel Morley

Personal details
- Born: 21 June 1817
- Died: 5 November 1878 (aged 61)
- Party: Conservative
- Parent(s): Philip John Miles; Clarissa Peach

John William Miles (21 June 1817 – 5 November 1878) was a British Conservative politician and briefly MP.

Miles was elected MP for Bristol at a by-election in April 1868. His election was soon declared void on 25 June 1868 due to "bribery and personation" and the findings saw the writ for the seat suspended until November. At the ensuing general election, Miles again stood for parliament but was unsuccessful.

He was director, at one time vice-chairman, of the Great Western Railway, a director of the Great Western Cotton Company, South Wales Union railway, and director of the Great Western Steamship Co; the SS Great Britain was registered in is co-ownership. He had been a member of the Bristol Docks committee and on the city’s council.

Miles was the third son of former Bristol MP Philip John Miles and was educated at both Eton College and Oxford University. During his life, he was also a Justice of the Peace and Deputy Lieutenant of Herefordshire. He was a member of the Carlton having been fast-tracked to membership upon election. He died unmarried in 1878.

Parliament of the United Kingdom
Preceded by Henry FitzHardinge Berkeley; Morton Peto	Member of Parliament for Bristol; April 1868 – June 1868; With: Henry FitzHardinge Berkeley	Succeeded by Henry FitzHardinge Berkeley; Samuel Morley
