= Philip Freke =

Bristol slave trader, d. 1729

Philip Freke (1661 - 10 December 1729) was an English merchant involved in the slave trade and based in Bristol. Freke stood unsuccessfully as a Tory candidate for the Bristol two seat constituency in the 1715 British general election.

In 1698 he was one of 33 signatories who petitioned the House of Lords against the introduction of a 10% tax for those engaged in the slave trade.

In 1708 he became Sheriff of Bristol

His daughter, Ann, married John Brickdale, with whom she had a son, Matthew Brickdale, who was twice MP for Bristol.

On his death, his son, Thomas Freke, took over his slave-trading business.
