= Joseph Earle (MP) =

British merchant of Bristol and politician

Joseph Earle (c.1658 – 1730), was a British merchant of Bristol and politician who sat in the House of Commons from 1710 to 1727.

== Early life ==
Earle was the eldest son of Sir Thomas Earle, MP and mayor of Bristol, and his wife Elizabeth Ellinor Jackson, daughter of Joseph Jackson. He was the brother of Giles Earle. He married Elizabeth Cann, daughter of Sir Thomas Cann, merchant, of Bristol by licence dated. 18 November 1689. He succeeded his father in 1696.

== Career ==
Earle had virtually talen over the mercantile business when his father died in 1696. He became a Member of the Society of Merchant Venturers of Bristol in 1697 and was Warden of the Society from 1709 to 1710. At the general election of 1710 he was elected as a Tory Member of Parliament for Bristol. In parliament he was much concerned with trade and occasionally voted with the Whigs. He was president of the Loyal Society, Bristol from 1712 to 1713. At the 1713 general election, he was re-elected MP for Bristol. In Parliament he displayed more ambivalence in his voting choices and was described as a Whig who often voted with the Tories. At the 1715 general election, he was elected as a Whig. He was master of the Society of Merchant Adventurers for the year 1721 to 1722; He was re-elected at the 1722 general election but began to fall out with parts of the Bristol voting community and was subjected to political attacks. He chose to stand rather than retire at the 1727 general election but as it turned out did not have enough support to poll.

== Death and legacy ==
Earle died, aged 72, on 13 March 1730, and was buried at St. Werburgh's church, Bristol. He and his wife had one daughter Eleanor, who married William Benson and died in 1722. He left his property at Bristol and Crudwell to a younger brother, Robert. He left the remainder to his daughter's son.

Parliament of Great Britain
Preceded by Sir William Daines; Robert Yate	Member of Parliament for Bristol; 1710–1727; With: Edward Colston 1710-1713; Thomas Edwards 1713-1715; Sir William Daines 1715-1722; Sir Abraham Elton, 1st Bt 1722-1727	Succeeded by John Scrope; Sir Abraham Elton, 2nd Bt
