= Thomas Canynges =

Member of the Parliament of England

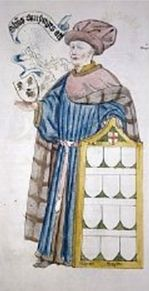
Thomas Canynges, Lord Mayor of London 1456-57. The escutcheon in his right hand shows the arms of Canynges: Argent, 3 Moor's heads couped in profile proper wreathed around the temples of the first and azure. The arms of the City of London are depicted under his left hand in the pediment of the framed shields. Painted by Roger Leigh, 15th century, collection of Corporation of London

Thomas Canynges (fl. 1450) was an English politician who served as Lord Mayor of London from 1456 to 1457.

== Background ==
He was probably born in Bristol before 1399, in a wealthy family of merchants and cloth manufacturers in that city. He was the eldest of seven children of John Canynges, who died as a young man in 1405, by his wife Joan Wotton. One of Thomas's younger brothers was the great Bristol merchant William II Canynges (1474). Thomas's grandfather, William I Canynges (d.1396) was also a great Bristol merchant and was also 5 times Mayor of Bristol and 3 times MP for Bristol, in 1383, 1384 and 1386. His second son, John Canynges, the father of Thomas, was also prominent in Bristol civic life, serving twice as mayor and as MP for Bristol in 1383.

== Career ==
Canyges was a member of the Worshipful Company of Grocers and became an Alderman for Aldgate ward in 1445. He was made Sheriff of London in 1449 and was elected Lord Mayor of London in 1456, his term ending in 1457. He was a Member of Parliament for City of London in 1459 as one of the two aldermanic representatives.

== Death ==
His wife [?mother, wife of John Canynges?] Joan Wotton survived him and married secondly in about 1408 Thomas Young, twice mayor of Bristol, by whom she had two successful sons, John Young, Alderman of London, Grocer and Lord Mayor of London in 1466, and Thomas Young (d. 1476) a lawyer of the Middle Temple, Recorder of Bristol from 1441 and MP for Bristol almost continuously, with one break in 1453, between 1435 and 1455. Thomas Young before 1450 entered into the household of Richard, Duke of York (d. 1460), the Yorkist contender for heirship to the throne then occupied by Henry VI (1422-1461).

== See also ==
- List of Sheriffs of the City of London
- List of Lord Mayors of London
- City of London (elections to the Parliament of England)

== Sources ==
- Pryce, George. Memorials of the Canynges Family and their Times, Bristol, 1854
- Oxford Dictionary of National Biography, 2004, Vol. 9, pp. 970–971
