= Lippincott baronets =

The Lippincott baronetcy, of Stoke Bishop in the County of Gloucester, was a title in the Baronetage of Great Britain. It was created on 7 September 1778 for the tobacco merchant Henry Lippincott, later Member of Parliament for Bristol. The title became extinct on the death of the 2nd Baronet in 1829.

== Lippincott baronets, of Stoke Bishop (1778) ==
- Sir Henry Lippincott, 1st Baronet (1737–1780)
- Sir Henry Cann Lippincott, 2nd Baronet (1776–1829)

Baronetage of Great Britain
Preceded by Jebb baronets	Lippincott baronets of Stoke Bishop; 7 September 1778	Succeeded by Rumbold baronets
