= Robert Nugent, 1st Earl Nugent =

Anglo-Irish politician and poet (1709–1788)

The Right Honourable The Earl Nugent PC
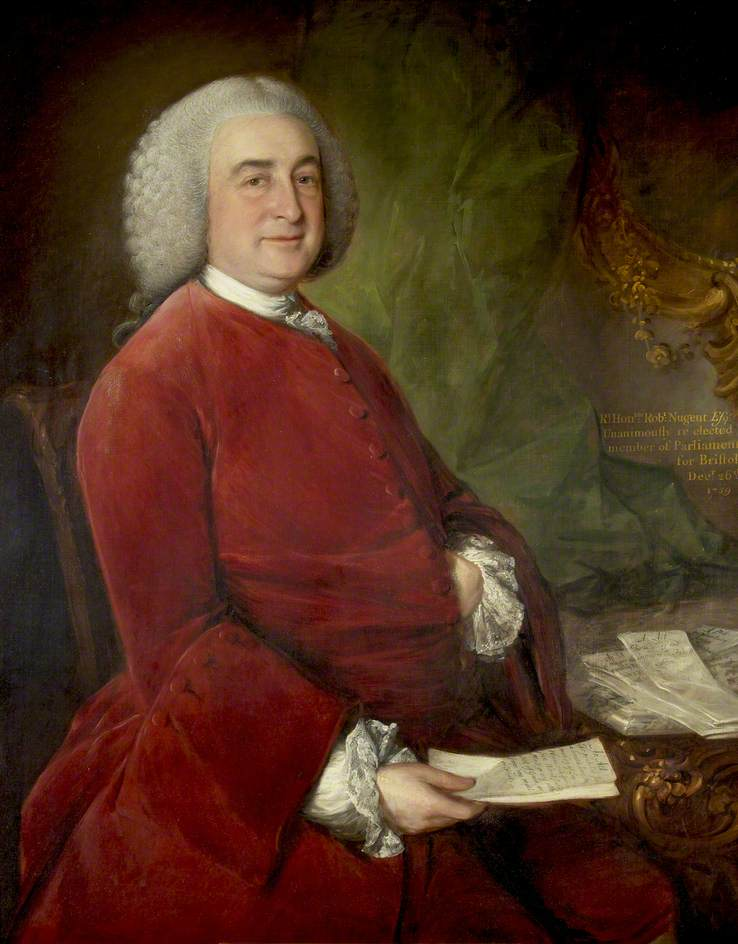
- Portrait by Thomas Gainsborough, 1782

First Lord of Trade
- In office 19 January 1767 – 20 January 1768
- Monarch: George III
- Prime Minister: The Earl of Chatham
- Preceded by: The Earl of Hillsborough
- Succeeded by: The Earl of Hillsborough

Robert Craggs-Nugent, 1st Earl Nugent, PC (1709 – 13 October 1788) was an Anglo-Irish politician and poet. He was tersely described by Richard Glover as a jovial and voluptuous Irishman who had left "Popery" for the Protestant religion, money and widows.

== Background ==
The son of Michael Nugent and Mary, daughter of Robert Barnewall, 9th Baron Trimlestown and Margaret Dongan, he was born at Carlanstown, County Westmeath, in 1709. He succeeded his father in the Carlanstown property on 13 May 1739.

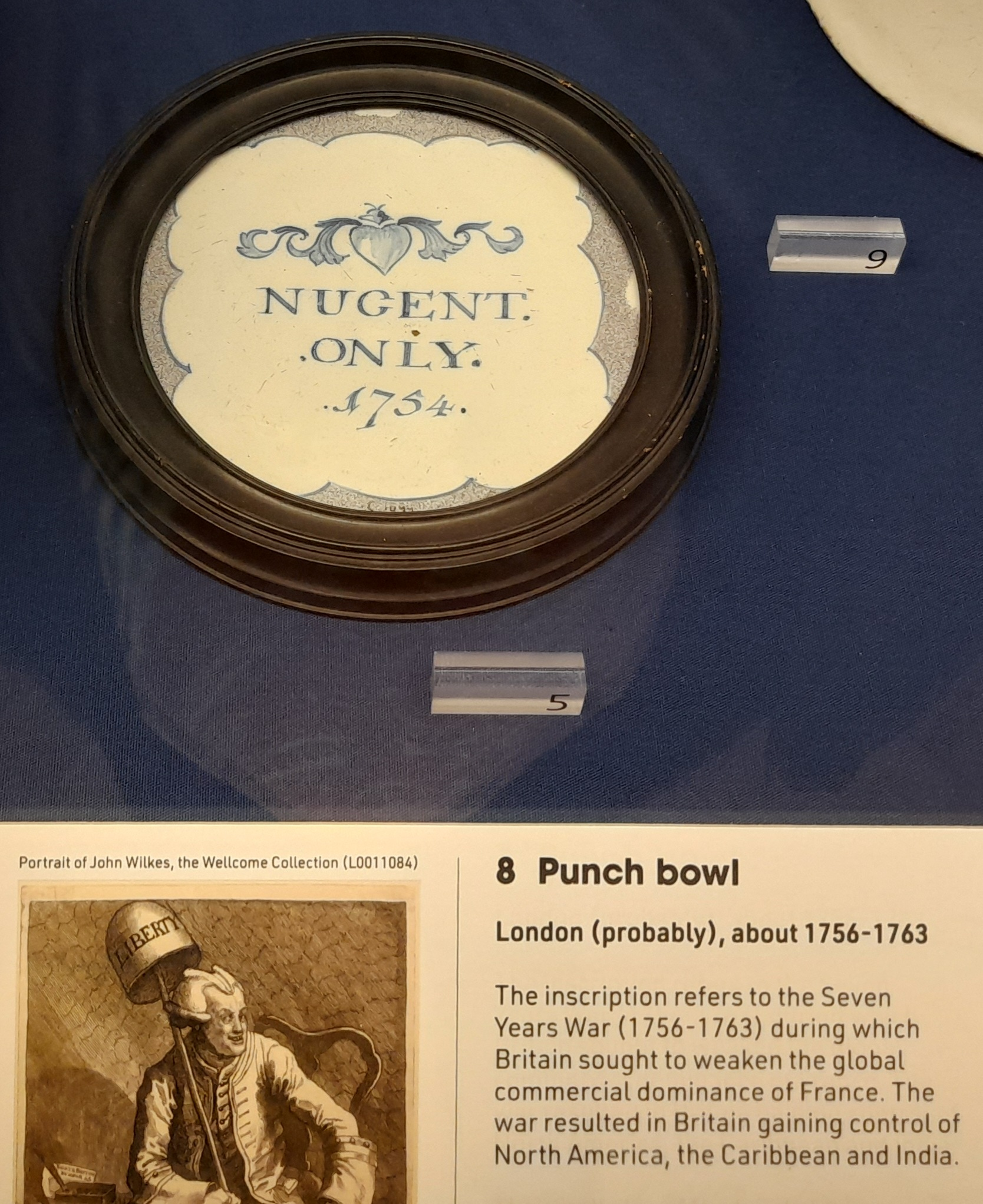
Ceramic wall plaque commemorating Nugent's election at Bristol in 1754, Bristol Museum & City Art Gallery

== Political career ==
His wife's property included the borough of St Mawes in Cornwall, and Nugent sat for that constituency from 1741 to 1754, after which date he represented Bristol until 1774, when he returned to St Mawes. By 1782, he had become the longest continually-serving member of the Commons, and so became the Father of the House.

In 1747 he succeeded Lord Doneraile as Comptroller of the Household to the Prince of Wales. Nugent lent the Prince large sums of money, which were never repaid; the appointments and peerages he received later in life have been attributed to the wish of the Prince of Wales's son, George III, to compensate Nugent.

Robert Craggs-Nugent, as he then was, served as a Lord of the Treasury from 1754 to 1759, and was made a Privy Counsellor on 15 December 1759. He was Vice-Treasurer of Ireland from 1759 to 1765, First Lord of Trade from 1766 to 1768, and Vice-Treasurer of Ireland again from 1768 to 1782. In 1768 he was made a member of the Irish Privy Council. His support of the ministry was so useful that he was created in 1767 Baron Nugent and Viscount Clare, and in 1776 Earl Nugent, all Irish peerages.

Apart from his political career, Lord Nugent was also the author of some poetical productions, several of which are preserved in the second volume of Dodsley's Collections (1748).

== Family ==
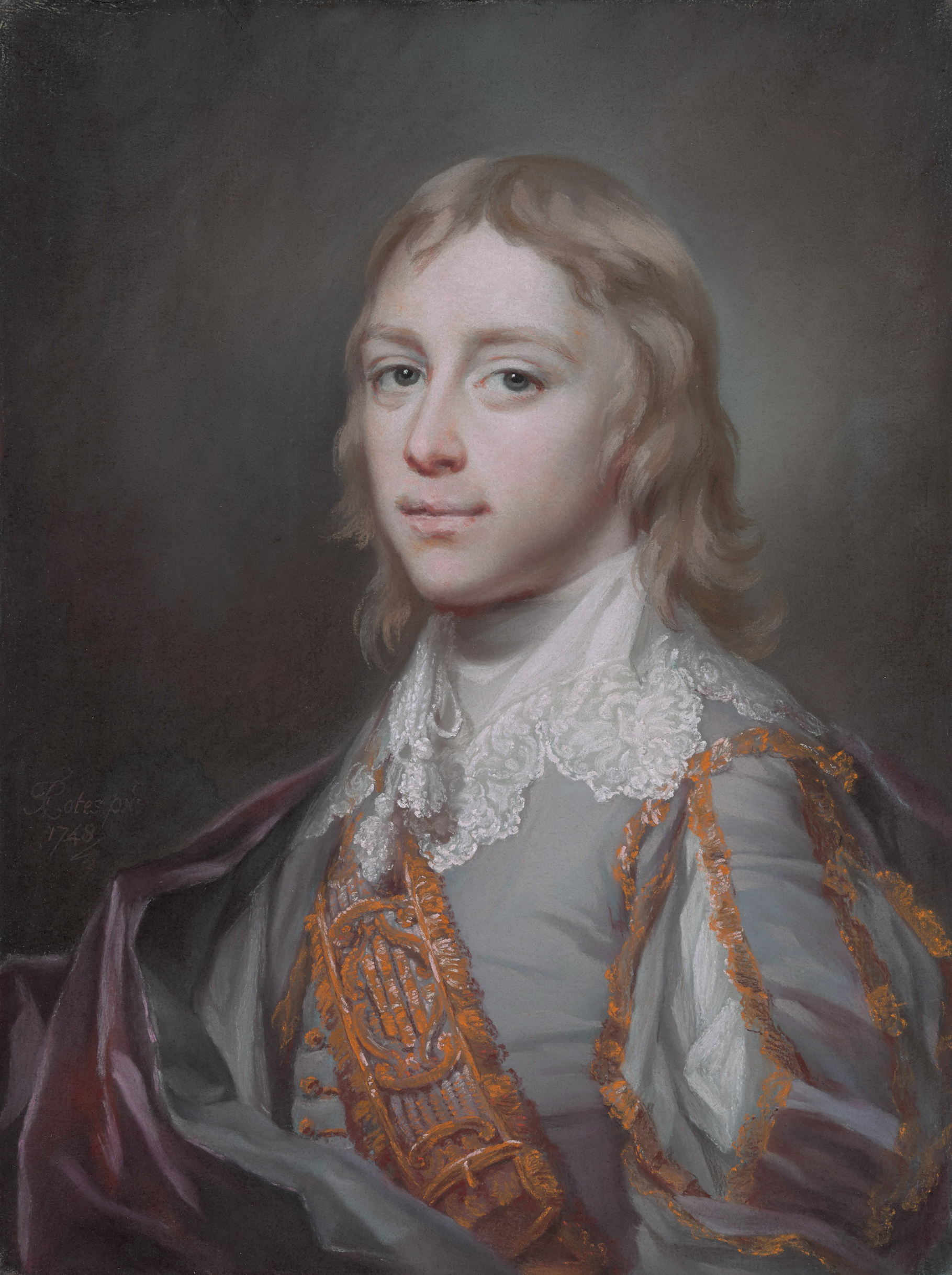
His son Lieutenant-Colonel Edmund Craggs Nugent (Francis Cotes, 1748)

Lord Nugent married firstly, on 14 July 1730, Emilia (died in childbirth 16 August 1731), daughter of Peter Plunkett, 4th Earl of Fingall. They had one son, Edmund, who became a Lieutenant-Colonel and the father of two illegitimate sons (later Field Marshal) Sir George Nugent, 1st Baronet, and Admiral of the Fleet Sir Charles Edmund Nugent) before dying in 1771.

Nugent married secondly, on 23 March 1736, Anna Knight (died 22 November 1756), widow of John Knight and daughter of James Craggs and sister of the Right Honourable James Craggs, the secretary of state. Nugent adopted the surname of Craggs-Nugent. She had already been widowed twice, but Robert, who was born a Roman Catholic, had abandoned his Church very early in life.

He married thirdly, on 2 January 1757, Elizabeth Drax (died 29 January 1792), the widow of the fourth Earl of Berkeley, who brought him a large fortune and with whom he had two daughters.

The earldom descended by special remainder to the earl's son-in-law, George Nugent-Temple-Grenville, 1st Marquess of Buckingham, and so to his successors, the dukes of Buckingham and Chandos.

Parliament of Great Britain
Preceded by Henry Vane; Richard Plumer	Member of Parliament for St Mawes; 1741–1754; With: James Douglas 1741–47; Lord Sundon 1747–53; Thomas Clavering 1753–54; Henry Seymour Conway from 1754	Succeeded by James Newsham; Henry Seymour Conway
Preceded by Edward Southwell; Robert Hoblyn	Member of Parliament for Bristol; 1754–1774; With: Richard Beckford 1754–56; Jarrit Smith 1756–68; Matthew Brickdale 1768–74	Succeeded by Henry Cruger; Edmund Burke
Preceded by James Colleton; George Boscawen	Member of Parliament for St Mawes; 1774–1784; With: Hugh Boscawen	Succeeded by William Young; Hugh Boscawen
Preceded by Charles FitzRoy-Scudamore	Father of the House; 1782–1784	Succeeded by Sir Charles Frederick
Political offices
Preceded by The Earl of Hillsborough	First Lord of Trade; 1767–1768	Succeeded by The Earl of Hillsborough
Peerage of Ireland
New creation	Earl Nugent; 1776–1788	Succeeded by George Nugent-Temple-Grenville
New creation	Viscount Clare; 1767–1788	Extinct
