= Thomas Earle (MP) =

English merchant and politician

Sir Thomas Earle (c. 1629–24 June 1696), of Bristol and Crudwell, was an English merchant and politician who sat in the House of Commons from 1681 to 1685.

== Early life ==
Earle was the son of William Earle, yeoman, of Patney and his wife Joan Dickenson, daughter of Robert Dickenson, yeoman, of Chirton. He was apprenticed to a merchant of Bristol in 1647, and became a Freeman of Bristol in 1656. He traded with New England and the Iberian Peninsula. Before 1658, he married Elinor Jackson, daughter of Joseph Jackson of Small Street, Bristol, and Sneyd Park, Gloucestershire.

== Political career ==
Earle became a member of the Society of Merchant Venturers of Bristol in 1663. In 1668, he became a common councilman of Bristol until 1684. He was Warden of the Merchant Venturers in 1670, Sheriff of Bristol for the year 1671 to 1672, and Master of the Merchant Venturers for the year 1673 to 1774. In 1676 he became a JP for Wiltshire. He succeeded to the estate of his uncle Giles Earle at Crudwell in 1677 and in the same year became Commissioner for Assessment for Bristol. He was also High Sheriff of Wiltshire for the year 1679 to 1680. He carried on trading with New England and the Peninsula after succeeding to the Crudwell estate.

Earle was elected as Member of Parliament for Bristol at a by election in January 1681 and again at the general election two months later. He became an alderman and Mayor of Bristol, and JP for Wiltshire and Somerset in 1681. He was knighted on 4 December 1681.

Earle did not stand for Parliament again at the 1685 general election. He became JP for Gloucestershire and Deputy Lieutenant for Bristol from 1685 to 1686. He ceased to be JP for Wiltshire, Gloucestershire and Somerset in 1687 prior to the Glorious Revolution. In October 1688 he became common councilman again and in 1689 became Deputy Lieutenant for Bristol and alderman for Bristol again. He also served again for a year as Commissioner for Assessment. In 1690 he became JP for Wiltshire again.

== Death and legacy ==
Earle died on 24 June 1696, aged 67, and was buried at St. Werburgh's. He and his wife had four sons and five daughters. His eldest son, Joseph succeeded to the family business and was a Whig MP for Bristol. His youngest son, Giles, inherited the Crudwell estate and was also MP.

Parliament of Great Britain
Preceded by Sir Robert Cann; Sir John Knight	Member of Parliament for Bristol; 1681–1685; With: Sir John Knight 1681; Sir Richard Hart 1681	Succeeded by Sir John Churchill; Sir Richard Crumpe
