= Sir Richard Vyvyan, 8th Baronet =

Politician and student of science

Sir Richard Vyvyan Bt

Personal details
- Born: Richard Rawlinson Vyvyan; 6 June 1800 Trelowarren, Cornwall
- Died: 15 August 1879 (aged 79) Trelowarren
- Resting place: Mawgan-in-Meneage, Cornwall
- Party: Tory/Ultra-Tory
- Education: Christ Church, Oxford
- Occupation: Landowner
- Profession: Scientist, politician

Sir Richard Rawlinson Vyvyan, 8th Baronet (6 June 1800 – 15 August 1879) was an English landowner and Tory politician who sat in the House of Commons variously between 1825 and 1857.

== Life ==
Vyvyan was born at Trelowarren, Cornwall, the son of Sir Vyell Vyvyan, 7th Baronet and his wife Mary Hutton Rawlinson, daughter of Thomas Hutton Rawlinson of Lancaster. He was educated at Harrow School and at Christ Church, Oxford but did not take a degree. In 1820, he succeeded to the baronetcy and Vyvyan family estates on the death of his father. He became a lieutenant-colonel commandant in the Cornwall yeomanry cavalry on 5 September 1820.

On his death his estate consisted of 9,738 acres (3,941 ha) in twenty-five Cornish parishes with a rent roll of £18,147. He left no issue and his successor was Sir Vyell Donnithorne Vyvyan, 9th Baronet (1826–1917)

== Political career ==
In 1825, Vyvyan was elected Member of Parliament for Cornwall. He held the seat until 1831. From 1831 he represented Okehampton, but upon the passage of the Reform Act 1832, he moved to Bristol, serving until 1837. He later served as Member for Helston from 1841 until 1857. Vyvyan was High Sheriff of Cornwall in 1840.

== Scientific work ==
In 1826, Vyvyan was made a Fellow of the Royal Society for his "considerable literary and scientific acquirements especially in the Philosophy of Natural History", previously having been a Fellow of the Geological Society. He was also the patron of Charles Thomas Pearce, who he initially employed as his secretary in about 1843, and with whom he undertook "researches on light, heat, and magnetism of the Moon's rays" over a period of years. Between 1846 and 1848, they shared a house built by Decimus Burton in London's Regent's Park, called St. Dunstan's Villa.

=== Evolution ===
Vyvyan was an advocate of Lamarckian evolution and transmutation of species. He was erroneously suspected of writing Vestiges of the Natural History of Creation until he denied authorship. Historian of science Pietro Corsi has written that Vyvyan "endorsed a quasi-Lamarckian transformation of species, together with phrenology and a broadly evolutionary cosmology."

=== Scientific writings ===
- An Essay on Arithmo-physiology, privately printed, 1825
- Psychology, or a Review of the Arguments in proof of the Existence and Immortality of the Animal Soul, vol. i. 1831; called in immediately after publication
- The Harmony of the Comprehensible World (anon.), 1842, 2 vols
- The Harmony of the Comprehensible World (anon.), 1845

He also published several letters and speeches. His letter to the magistrates of Berkshire on their practice of 'consigning prisoners to solitary confinement before trial, and ordering them to be disguised by masks,' passed into a second edition in 1845. His account of the fogou or cave at Halligey, Trelowarren, is in the Journal of the Royal Institution of Cornwall (1885, viii. 256–8).

Parliament of the United Kingdom
Preceded by Sir William Lemon, 1st Baronet; John Hearle Tremayne	Member of Parliament for Cornwall; 1825–1831; With: John Hearle Tremayne 1825–1826; Edward William Wynne Pendarves 1826–1831	Succeeded by Edward William Wynne Pendarves; Sir Charles Lemon
Preceded by William Henry Trant; John Thomas Hope	Member of Parliament for Okehampton; 1831–1832; With: John Thomas Hope	Constituency abolished
Preceded by James Evan Baillie; Edward Davis Protheroe	Member of Parliament for Bristol; 1832–1837; With: James Evan Baillie 1832–1835; Philip John Miles 1832–1837	Succeeded by Philip William Skinner Miles; Francis Henry Fitzhardinge Berkeley
Preceded by John Basset	Member of Parliament for Helston; 1841–1857	Succeeded by Charles Trueman
Baronetage of England
Preceded by Vyell Vyvyan	Baronet (of Trelowarren); 1820–1879	Succeeded by Vyell Donnithorne Vyvyan
