= March 1870 Bristol by-election =

In 1870 the Bristol Parliamentary Constituency held two by-elections, one in March and the second in June. The March 1870 Bristol by-election was fought on 29 March 1870 due to the death of the incumbent Liberal MP, Henry FitzHardinge Berkeley. It was won by the Liberal candidate, Elisha Smith Robinson.

By-Election 29 March 1870
Party	Candidate	Votes	%	±%
Liberal	Elisha Smith Robinson	7,882	52.7	−19.6
Conservative	Sholto Vere Hare	7,062	47.3	+19.6
Majority		820	5.4	−3.0
Turnout		14,944	70.6	−2.3
Registered electors		21,153		
Liberal hold		Swing	−19.6	
