= James Evan Baillie =

British politician

James Evan Baillie (1781 – 14 June 1863) was a British West Indies merchant, landowner and Whig politician who sat in the House of Commons in two periods between 1813 and 1835.

Baillie was the third son of Evan Baillie of Dochfour and his wife Mary Gurley, daughter of Peter Gurley of St. Vincent. His father was a landowner in Scotland with commercial interests in Bristol including the firm of Evan Baillie, Sons & Co. Baillie, together with his older brother Hugh Duncan Baillie, became a partner in the Bristol Old Bank in 1812 after death of his brother Peter Baillie. In 1813 Baillie became Member of Parliament for Tralee and held the seat until 1818. Baillie was a partner in J E Baillie, Fraser & Co of Bristol, Chairman of British Guiana Association, president of Whig Anchor club of Bristol and a Member of Brook's club. He was put up for parliament at Bristol without his consent in 1820 but in fact his brother Hugh stood unsuccessfully. He became Member of Parliament for Bristol in 1830 and held the seat until 1835. In parliament he was in favour of parliamentary reform and catholic relief.

In 1834 Baillie purchased land in Badenoch comprising the Laggan farms on the upper Spey, the Kingussie lands from Ballachroan to Kerrowmeanach, and the Alvie farms of Pitchurn, Pitourie and Delfour from the Trustees of the Gordon Estates. He continued to buy land in Scotland after his father's death in 1835. He had been a prominent opponent of abolition but after abolition received a slave compensation of £53,964 in 1835–1836. When the British government emancipated the slaves in the 1830s, James and his brother Hugh received compensation for more than 450 slaves across 21 estates in British Guiana, Grenada, St Kitts, St Vincent, and Trinidad. This money was invested in further Scottish estates at Glenelg in 1837, Glenshiel in 1838 and Letterfinlay in 1851.

Baillie never married and died at the age of 82.

Parliament of the United Kingdom
Preceded by Henry Arthur Herbert	Member of Parliament for Tralee; 1813–1818	Succeeded by Edward Denny
Preceded by Henry Bright; Richard Hart Davis	Member of Parliament for Bristol; 1830–1835; With: Richard Hart Davis to 1831; Edward Protheroe 1831–1832; Sir Richard Rawlinson Vyvyan, Bt from 1832	Succeeded by Philip John Miles; Sir Richard Rawlinson Vyvyan, Bt
