= Union Club (Bristol) =

18th-cent. UK Whig political club

The Union Club was an eighteenth century political club in Bristol that organised political support for Whig candidates. It was opposed to the Tory supporting Steadfast society.
