= Steadfast society =

18th-cent. UK Tory political club

The Steadfast society was an eighteenth century political club in Bristol that organised political support for Tory candidates. It was opposed to the Whig supporting Union Club.
