= William II Canynges =

English merchant (c. 1399–1474)

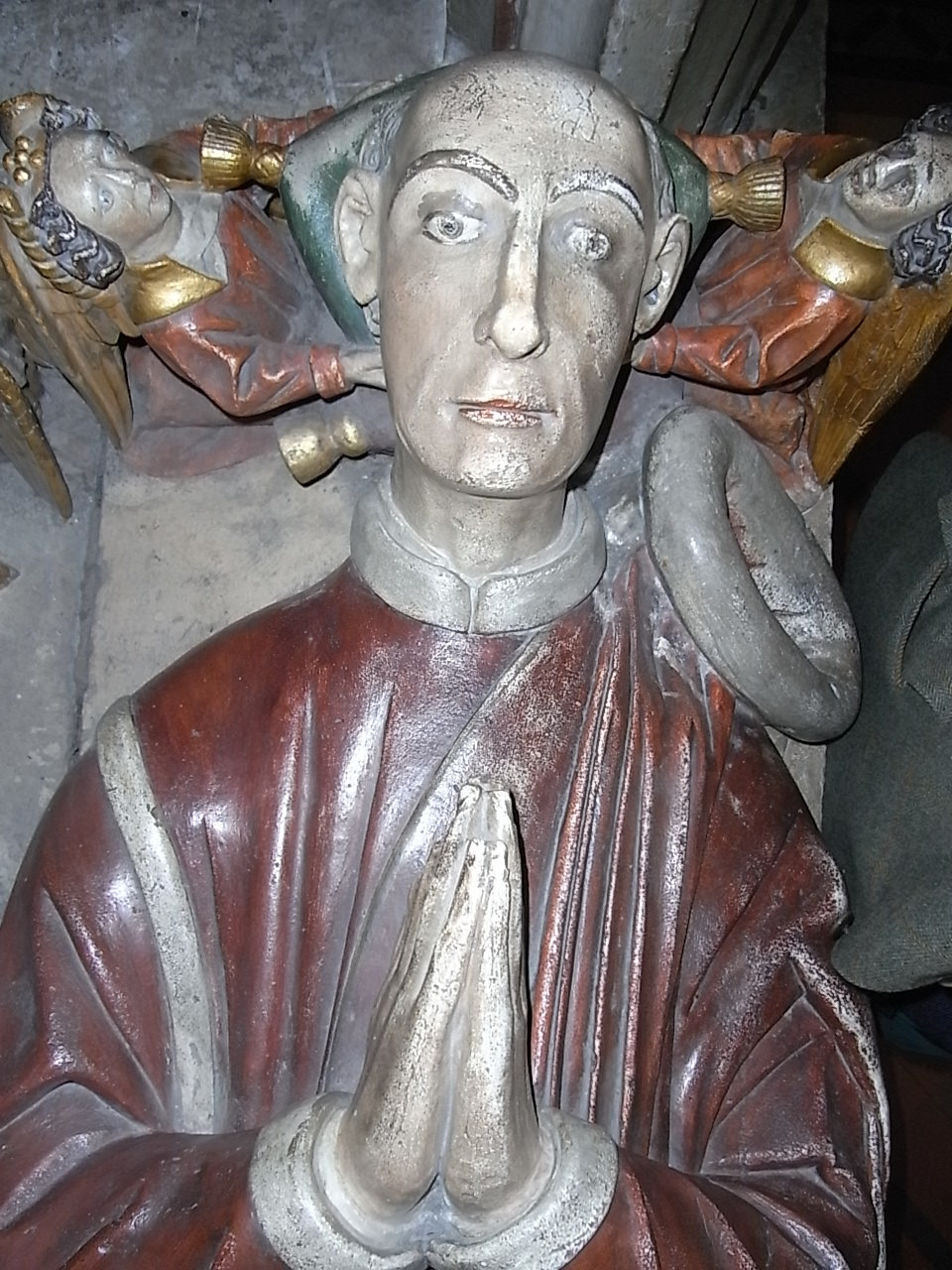
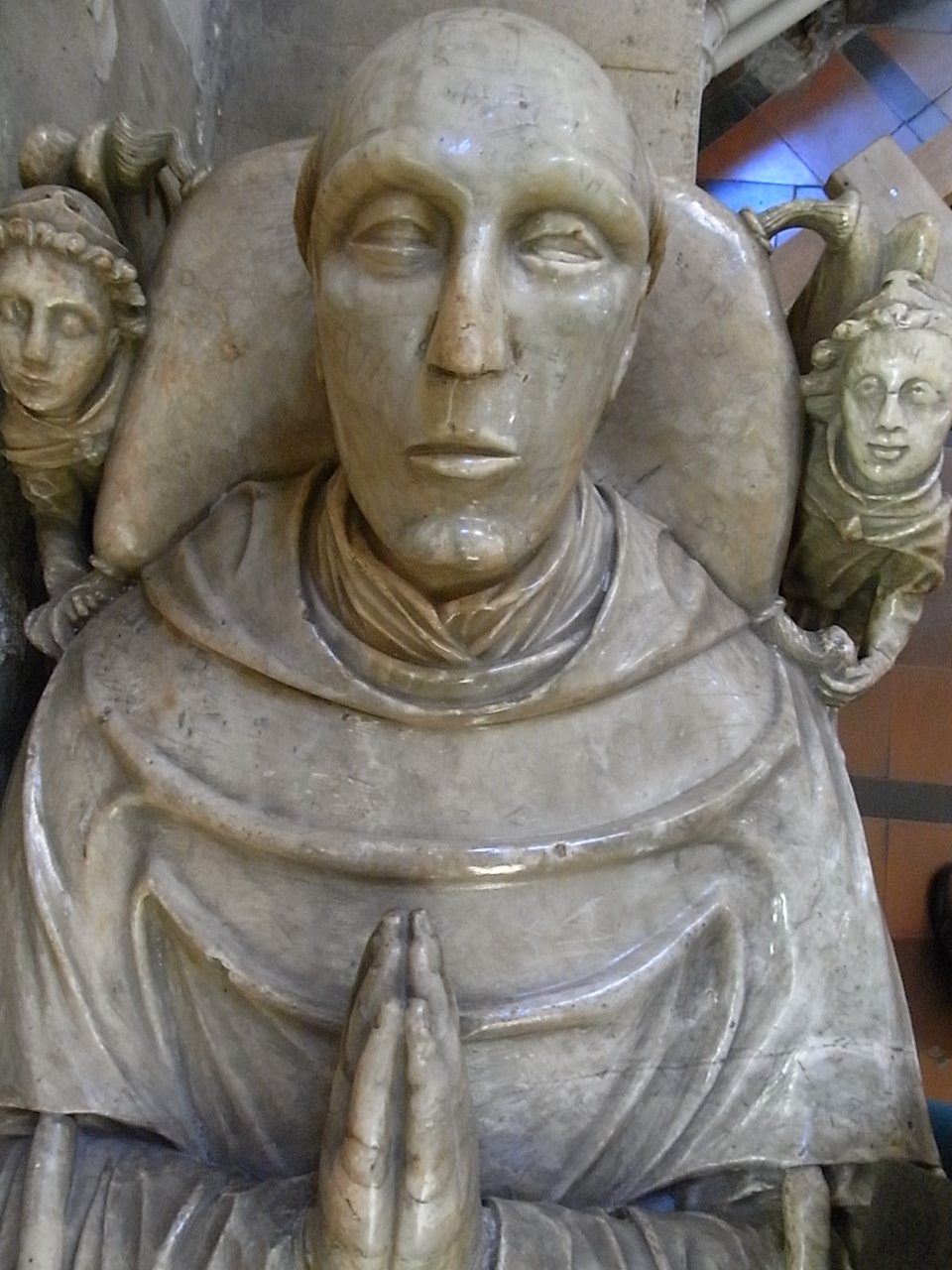
Two effigies of William II Canynges (d. 1474), both in St Mary Redcliffe Church, Bristol, south wall of south aisle. Left, in red velvet mayoral robes beside his wife Joan under an ornate stone canopy; right, alabaster, in canonical vestments, moved from Collegiate Church of Westbury-on-Trym, Bristol following Dissolution

William II Canynges (c. 1399–1474) was an English merchant and shipper from Bristol, one of the wealthiest private citizens of his day and an occasional royal financier. He served as Mayor of Bristol five times and as MP for Bristol thrice. He was a generous patron of the arts in Bristol, particularly concerning the church of St Mary Redcliffe in Bristol, "The crown of Bristol architecture". Following the death of his wife Joan in 1467, he renounced civic and commercial life and was ordained a priest in 1468, in which capacity he remained until his death six years later. His tomb effigy in St Mary's later inspired the boy poet Thomas Chatterton to write the romantic poem "The Storie of William Canynge".

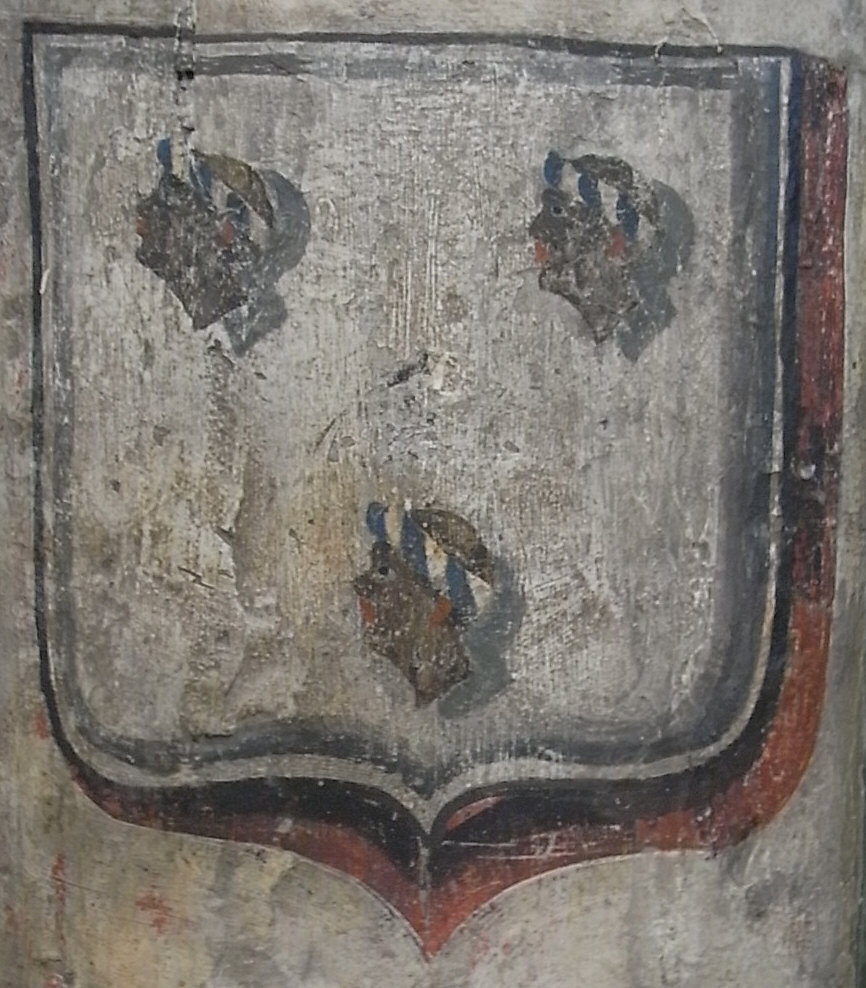
Arms of William Canynges, as depicted on his canopied tomb in St Mary Redcliffe: Argent, 3 Moor's heads couped in profile proper wreathed around the temples of the first and azure. The shape of the shield, being a late Tudor (16th century or later) escutcheon suggests this is a later addition or possibly repainting. The arms are however accurate as they match those shown in the contemporary portrait of his elder brother Thomas by Roger Leigh

== Background ==
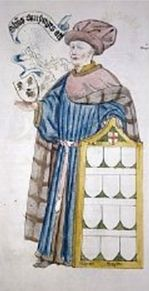
Thomas Canynges, Mayor of London 1456–7, eldest brother of William II. Painted by Roger Leigh, 15th century, collection of Corporation of London

Canynges was born in Bristol in 1399 or 1400, a member of a wealthy family of merchants and cloth manufacturers in that city. He was one of the younger of seven children of John Canynges, who died as a young man in 1405, by his wife Joan Wotton. William's eldest brother Thomas Canynges was Lord Mayor of London in 1456–7, having been elected Alderman for Aldgate ward in 1445, and was a Grocer. William's grandfather William I Canynges (d. 1396) was also a great Bristol merchant and was also five times Mayor of Bristol and three times MP for Bristol, in 1383, 1384 and 1386. His second son John Canynges, the father of William II, was also prominent in Bristol civic life, serving twice as mayor and as MP for Bristol in 1383. His wife Joan Wotton survived him and married secondly in about 1408 Thomas Young, twice mayor of Bristol, by whom she had two successful sons, John Young, Alderman of London, Grocer and Lord Mayor of London in 1466, and Thomas Young (d. 1476) a lawyer of the Middle Temple, Recorder of Bristol from 1441 and MP for Bristol almost continuously, with one break in 1453, between 1435 and 1455. Thomas Young served as the other of Bristol's two MPs during his half-brother William II Canynges's terms as MP in 1450 and 1455, and before 1450 entered into the household of Richard, Duke of York (d. 1460), the Yorkist contender for heirship to the Throne then occupied by Henry VI (1422–1461).

== Marriage ==
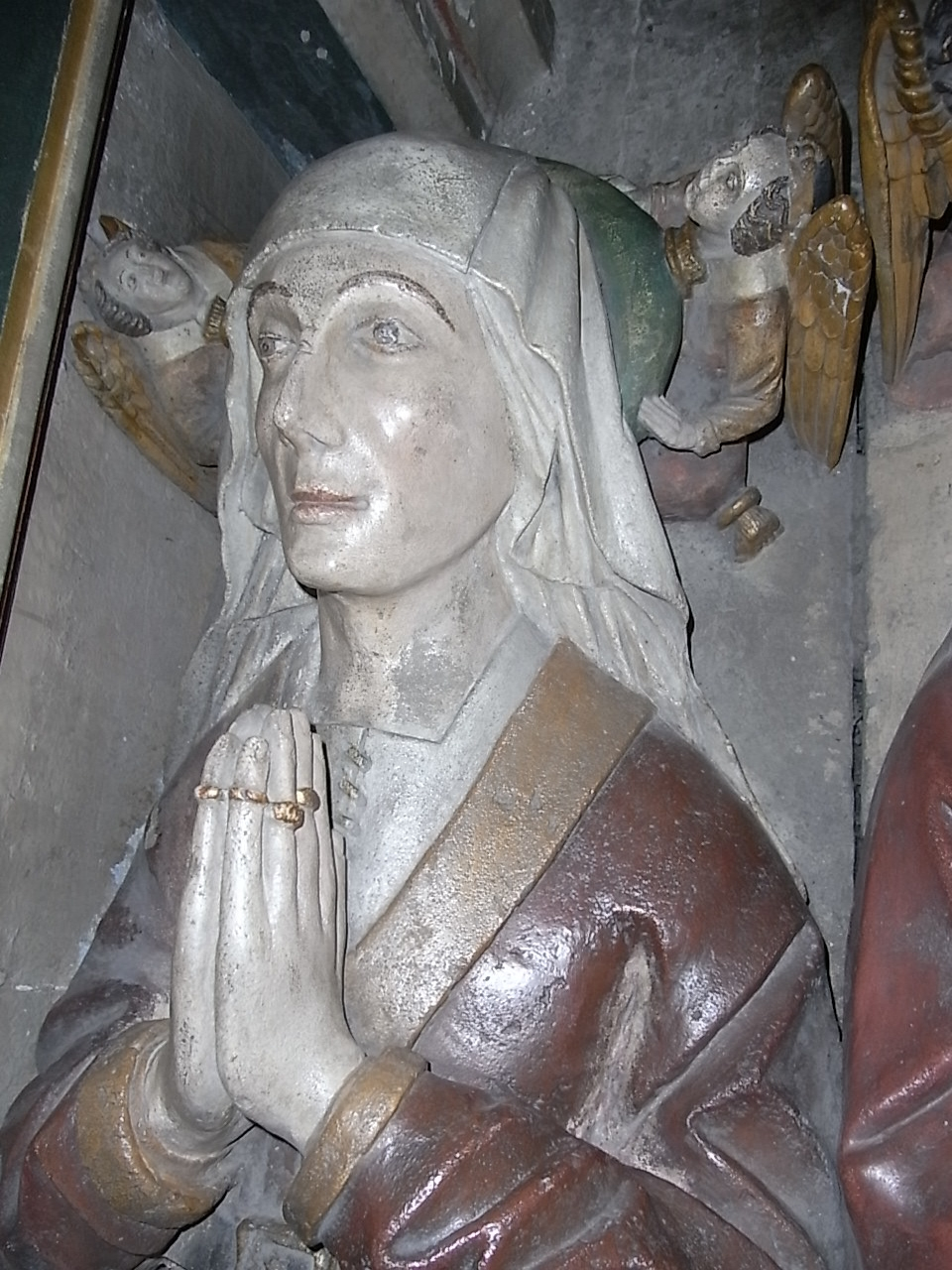
Effigy of Joan Burton (d. 1467), wife of William II Canynges. Next to effigy of her husband under ornate stone canopy, St Mary Redcliffe, Bristol

At some time before 1429 William married Joan Burton, from a prominent Bristol family. Her sister Isabel became the wife of William's half-brother Thomas Young, with whom he served jointly for two terms as MP for Bristol. William and Joan had two sons, who were encouraged by their father to become members of the Gloucestershire gentry, yet both predeceased him, and thus ended the Canynges dynasty in Bristol. Joan died in September 1467, following which traumatic event William renounced his former life and entered the priesthood.

== Mercantile career ==
Although Canynges benefitted from the wide trade connections of his forebears and a large inheritance, he does not seem to have followed them in the cloth manufacturing industry as his name was never recorded in the aulnage returns, but rather specialised in the shipping of cloth to south-west Europe. In 1436 he served as Constable of the Merchants of the Staple, a key post in the wool export trade, and became a Grocer in 1441, like his half-brother John Young. His trading activities involved both other Bristol merchants and London men.

=== Invests in Robert Sturmy's expedition ===
He was an investor in the disastrous 1457/8 Mediterranean venture of fellow Bristol mayor and merchant Robert Sturmy. This was an expedition to the Aegean Sea seeking to break the Italian monopoly in trade with the Orient and to set up an English trading post in the Levant. His investors, including Canynges, financed the fitting out of three ships carrying cargoes of cloth, tin and lead. The fleet traded successfully in the Levant but was attacked by Genoese pirates near Malta which resulted in the loss of two ships, Katherine and Marie. Sturmy himself lost his life during the incident but his main partner John Heydon managed to return to Bristol. The king fined the Genoese traders in England £6,000 in damages, and imprisoned them and seized their assets until the fine should be paid. This put a stop to further English adventures in the Mediterranean for many years, but prompted a new look to westward lands, which bore fruit under John Cabot in 1497.

=== Acquires large fleet ===
He appears to have started to specialise in shipping the goods of others rather than trading on his own account. He owned a fleet of at least ten ships, as is stated in William Worcester's "Itineraries", one of the largest known in England at that time, and is said to have employed 800 sailors. Three of his ships exceeded 200 tons, then considered large: The Mary Canynges (400 tons), Mary Redcliffe (500 tons) and the Mary and John (900 tons). The last was considered by Worcester "a monster" and had cost £2666 13s. 4d. to build. His combined tonnage was almost 3,000 tons.

=== Trade with Scandinavia ===
Canynges also traded towards Scandinavia, exporting cloth and filling his homeward bound ships with fish. By special licence from the king of Denmark he enjoyed for some time a monopoly of the fish trade between Iceland, Finland and England, and he also competed successfully with the Flemish merchants in the Baltic Sea, obtaining a large share of their business.

== Political career ==
Canynges's civic career started in 1432 with his appointment as bailiff of Bristol and in 1438 as Sheriff. He was five times mayor of Bristol, first in September 1441 when still aged under 40. He served as Mayor also in 1449, 1456, 1461 and 1466. He was elected three times as MP for Bristol, in 1439, 1450–1 and 1455.

== Interaction with royalty ==
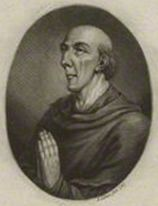
William II Canynges by J. Jehner. Mezzotint, 1787. National Portrait Gallery, NPG D24072

At Bristol in 1456 he entertained Queen Margaret of Anjou, consort of the Lancastrian King Henry VI (1422–1461). William's half-brother Thomas Young, whilst serving with him as the Bristol MPs in 1450, had proposed a motion in Parliament for the recognition of his Yorkist royal patron Richard, Duke of York (d. 1460) as heir to Henry's throne, for which action he was imprisoned. Canynges appears to have shared his half-brother's support for the Yorkist cause as in 1450 during his third term as mayor he prevented the sale in Bristol of gunpowder intended for use against the Duke. He also occupied Bristol Castle on the Duke's instructions, holding it against his rival Edmund Beaufort, 2nd Duke of Somerset (d. 1455). Whilst mayor in September 1461, following Henry's deposition in that year, Canynges received in Bristol the Duke's son, the new Yorkist King Edward IV (1461–1483), to whom he loaned 500 marks.

== Patron of arts ==
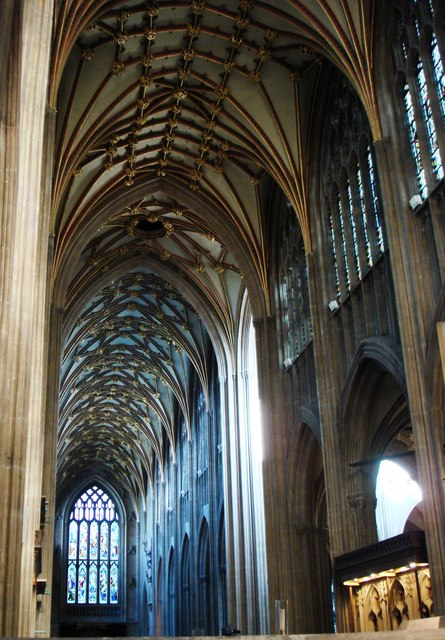
Aisle of St Mary Redcliffe Church, "The crown of Bristol architecture", looking east

Canynges undertook at his own expense the great work of rebuilding the great Bristol church of St Mary Redcliffe, and for a long time had a hundred workmen in his regular service for this purpose. He added to its jewels and equipment, and founded two chantries in 1466 and 1467 to which were attached two priests. He created an endowment of £340 to re-establish the two "St Mary priests" and three clerics. His house in Bristol with a fine Perpendicular Gothic oak roof was still standing in 1884. His contemporary John Shipward (d. 1473), a fellow Bristol merchant was a similarly generous patron of Bristol arts, having financed the building of the tower of St Stephen's Church. Both followed in the footsteps of Walter Frampton (d. 1357), thrice Mayor of Bristol, who funded the building of the Church of St John the Baptist, Bristol.

== Takes Holy Orders ==
The death of his wife Joan in September 1467 was a turning point in Canynges's life, for he gave up his commercial and political life for the cloister. Before the Dissolution of the Monasteries Bristol was within the Diocese of Worcester, and it was under the care of Bishop John Carpenter of Worcester(d.1476) that his transformation to the clergy occurred. He first obtained the post of rector of St Alban's, Worcester, and was admitted by the bishop on 19 September 1467 to the order of acolyte, and ordained priest by him on 16 April 1468. He was appointed a canon of the Collegiate Church of Westbury-on-Trym and prebendary of Goodringhill. He said mass for the first time in St Mary Redcliffe, the church to which he had been a generous patron, the following Whitsuntide. He moved his residence from Redcliffe to Westbury where he became dean in June 1469, and where he remained until his death five years later in 1474.

== Death and burial ==
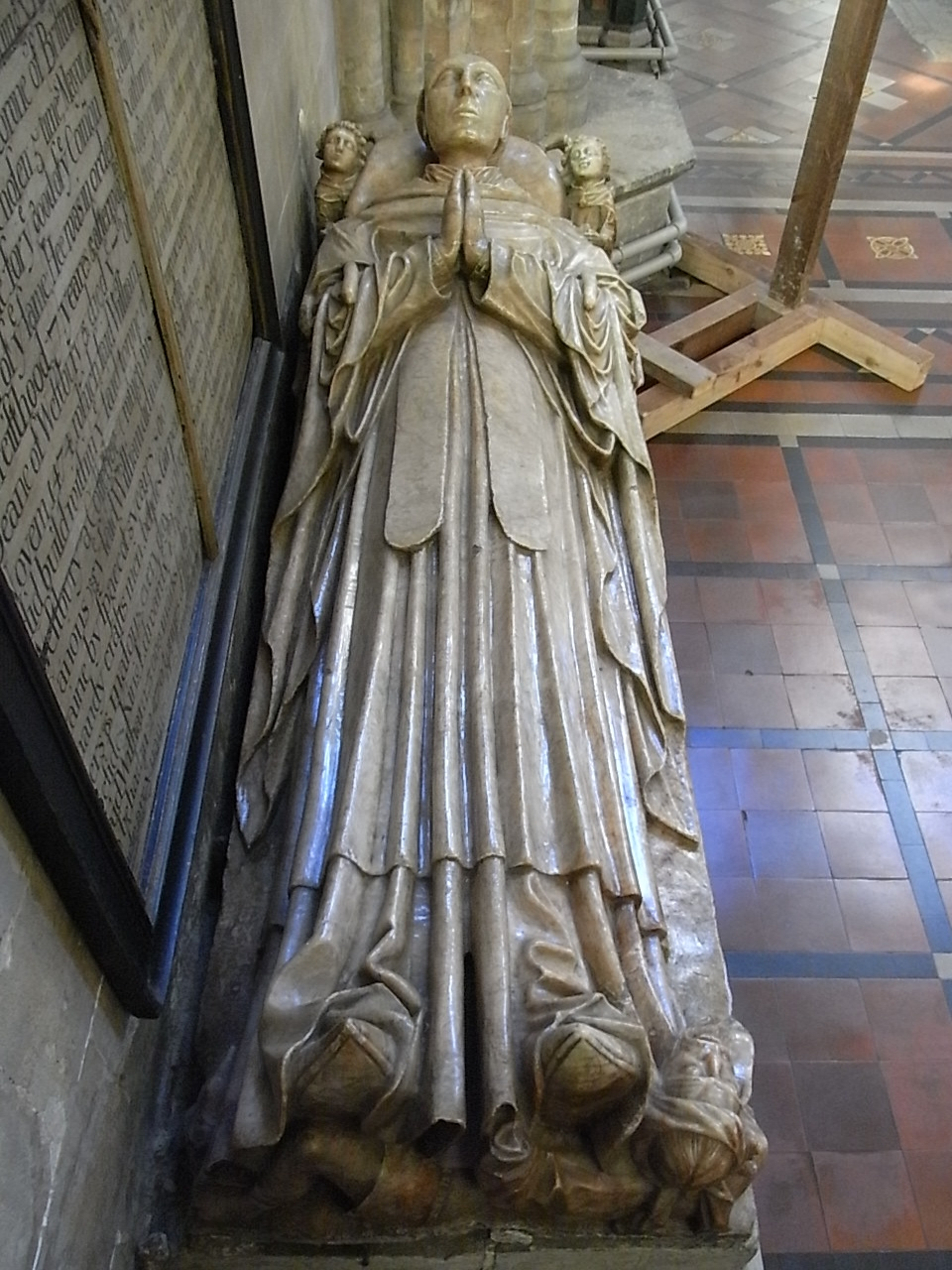
Two monuments to William II Canynges (d. 1474), both in St Mary Redcliffe Church, Bristol, south wall of south aisle. Left, the canopied stone tomb containing effigies of Canynges and his wife Joan; right, alabaster, in canonical vestments, originally at Westbury-on-Trym

Canynges died on 17 or 19 November 1474 and was buried in St Mary Redcliffe Church, Bristol, where a canopied stone tomb was erected in the south aisle in his memory containing his effigy in red velvet mayoral robes, next to that of his wife Joan. A funeral service was held at Westbury-on-Trym, where a very high quality sculpted alabaster effigy of him was placed, dressed in clerical attire. Following the Dissolution of Westbury, the effigy was moved to St Mary Redcliffe Church, where it is now situated adjacent to the original monument, against the south wall of the south aisle. The tombstone of Canynges's cook is set into the pavement nearby, decorated with incised cooking utensils of knife and sieve.

== Descendants ==
The statesman George Canning, and Stratford Canning, 1st Viscount Stratford de Redcliffe, were descendants of his family.

== Sources ==
- Pryce, George. Memorials of the Canynges Family and their Times, Bristol, 1854
- Oxford Dictionary of National Biography, 2004, Vol. 9, pp. 970–971
