= June 1870 Bristol by-election =

In 1870 the Bristol Parliamentary constituency held two by-elections, one in March and the second in June. The June 1870 Bristol by-election was fought on 27 June 1870 due to the election of Elisha Smith Robinson being declared void on petition. It was won by the Liberal candidate, Kirkman Hodgson.

By-Election 27 June 1870
Party	Candidate	Votes	%	±%
Liberal	Kirkman Hodgson	7,816	51.9	−20.4
Conservative	Sholto Vere Hare	7,238	48.1	+20.4
Majority		578	3.8	−4.6
Turnout		15,054	71.2	−1.7
Registered electors		21,153		
Liberal hold		Swing	−20.4	
