= Thomas White (died 1542) =

English politician

Thomas White (by 1500 – 1542) was an English politician.

He was a member (MP) of the parliament of England for Bristol in 1539.
