= John Newton (MP for Bristol) =

English politician

John Newton (fl. 1388–1435) was an English politician. He sat as MP for Bristol in 1407.

He also served as bailiff of Bristol from Michaelmas 1405 till 1406, as sheriff from 13 October 1413 till 9 October 1414, as mayor from Michaelmas 1418 till 1419 and 1427 till 1428, as constable of the Bristol Staple from 26 September 1407 till 1408, Michaelmas 1429 till 1430, commissioner of inquiry in Bristol in May 1428 concerning illegal pilgrim traffic.
