= Henry Cruger =

British-American politician (1739–1827)

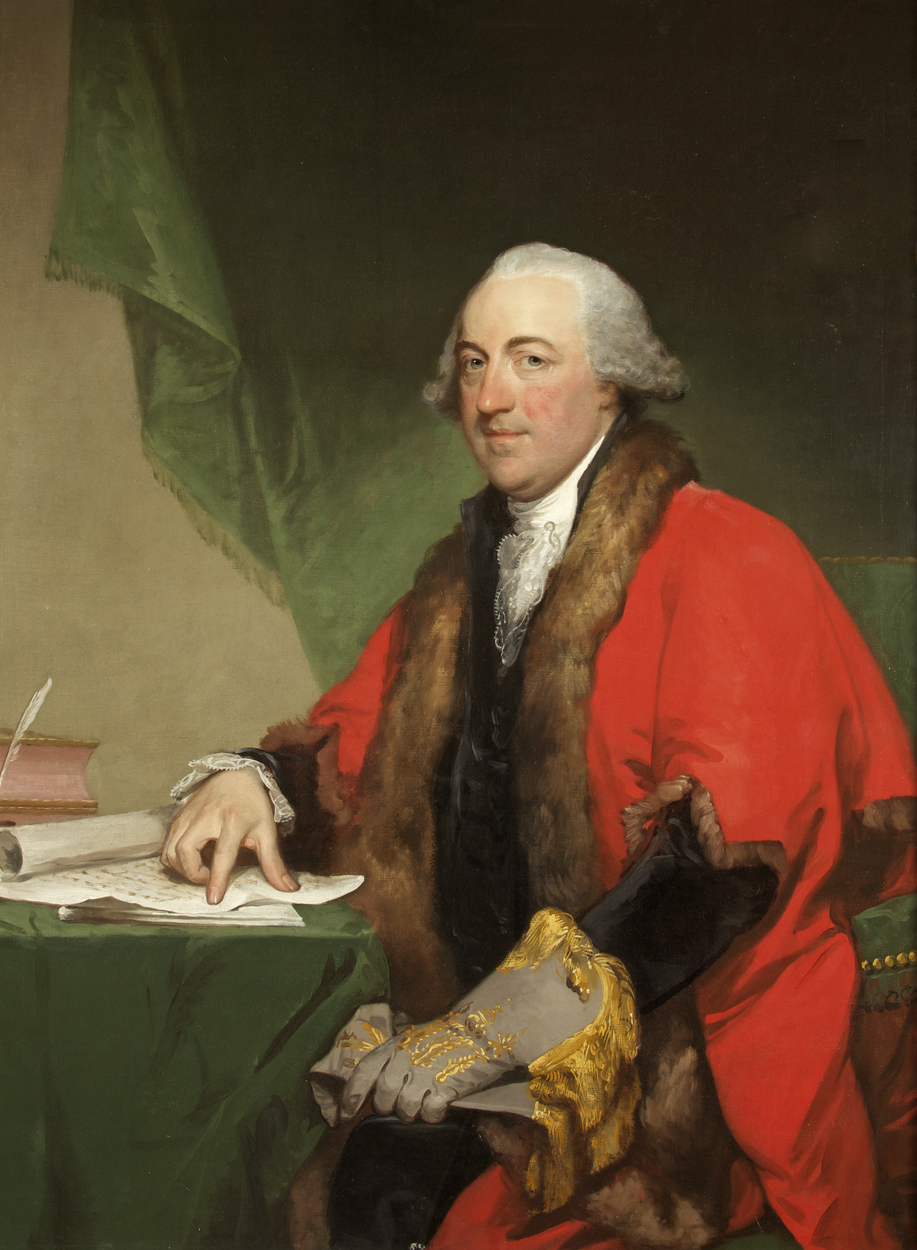
- Portrait of Henry Cruger by Gilbert Stuart, 1794

Member of the New York State Senate
- In office July 1, 1792 – June 30, 1796

Member of the British Parliament for Bristol
- In office 1784–1790 Serving with Matthew Brickdale
- Preceded by: Matthew Brickdale; George Daubeny
- Succeeded by: Marquess of Worcester; The Lord Sheffield

Member of the British Parliament for Bristol
- In office 1774–1780 Serving with Edmund Burke
- Preceded by: The Earl Nugent; Matthew Brickdale
- Succeeded by: Matthew Brickdale; Sir Henry Lippincott, Bt

Personal details
- Born: November 22, 1739 Province of New York, British America
- Died: April 24, 1827 (aged 87) New York City, U.S.
- Party: Whig; Federalist
- Spouses: Hannah Peach (m. 1765; died 1767) Elizabeth Blair (died 1790) Caroline Smith (m. 1799)
- Relations: John Cruger Jr. (uncle); John Cruger (grandfather)
- Parent(s): Henry Cruger Sr. Elizabeth Harris
- Education: King's College

Henry Cruger Jr. (November 22, 1739 – April 24, 1827) was a British-American merchant at the time of the American Revolution. He has a unique distinction of having been elected to both the Parliament of Great Britain (MP, 1774–1780, 1784–1790) and the New York State Senate (1792–1796).

== Early life ==
Henry Cruger was born in New York and was a member of a wealthy merchant family. His parents were Elizabeth (née Harris) Cruger (1716–1752) and Henry Cruger Sr. (1707–1780), a member of the New York General Assembly and then the governor's council. His eldest brother, John Harris Cruger, succeeded his father as a member of the governor's council of New York, served as a Loyalist during the War and later moved to England. Two other brothers settled in the West Indies. His younger sister, Mary Cruger, was married to Jacob Walton, also a representative in General Assembly for New York.

His paternal grandparents were Maria (née Cuyler) Cruger, an heiress (and sister of Albany Mayor Johannes Cuyler), and John Cruger, an alderman who served as the 38th mayor of New York City and was born in Bristol, England. His uncle John Cruger Jr. served as the 41st mayor of New York City and was the last Speaker of the New York General Assembly.

Cruger studied at King's College (now Columbia University) in New York City, but before being graduated he moved to Bristol, England, in 1757.

== Career ==
Upon his relocation to Bristol, he was placed in a family mercantile house and became wealthy until the Stamp Act greatly affected his livelihood and caused him much financial embarrassment. In 1765, Cruger was elected to the Bristol Common Council, a position he held until 1790. He was named sheriff of the city for 1766–1767. Cruger was elected a warden of the Society of Merchant Venturers in 1768, and Master of the Society in 1781. His father, who came to England in 1775, died in Bristol in 1780.

=== Political career ===
Cruger, who was known for his "ready wit and fine conversational powers," was elected as Member of Parliament for Bristol as a radical Whig in the 1774 general election in which British policy towards the colonies was an important issue. The other Whig candidate, also elected, but by a smaller majority, was Edmund Burke, who was, among other things, the provincial agent for the Province of New York. In his maiden speech before Parliament, Cruger criticized it for worsening the breach between Britain and her colonies. In 1776, he faulted the ministry for abandoning British sympathizers in the colony of New York. In 1777, he supported the repeal of the Declaratory Act (1766), and by 1780, he favored American independence.

Defeated for reelection in 1780, he became Bristol's mayor in 1781. In the 1784 general election, Cruger was again returned to Parliament as the member for Bristol as a supporter of William Pitt the Younger. Throughout his political career in England he urged conciliation with America. In 1789, he sought in vain for a consular appointment in the United States from Pitt.

Cruger returned to New York in 1790 after an absence of 33 years and was elected as a Federalist to the New York State Senate in 1792, urging conciliation with Great Britain while serving an otherwise undistinguished single four-year term in the 16th to the 19th New York State Legislatures.

== Personal life ==
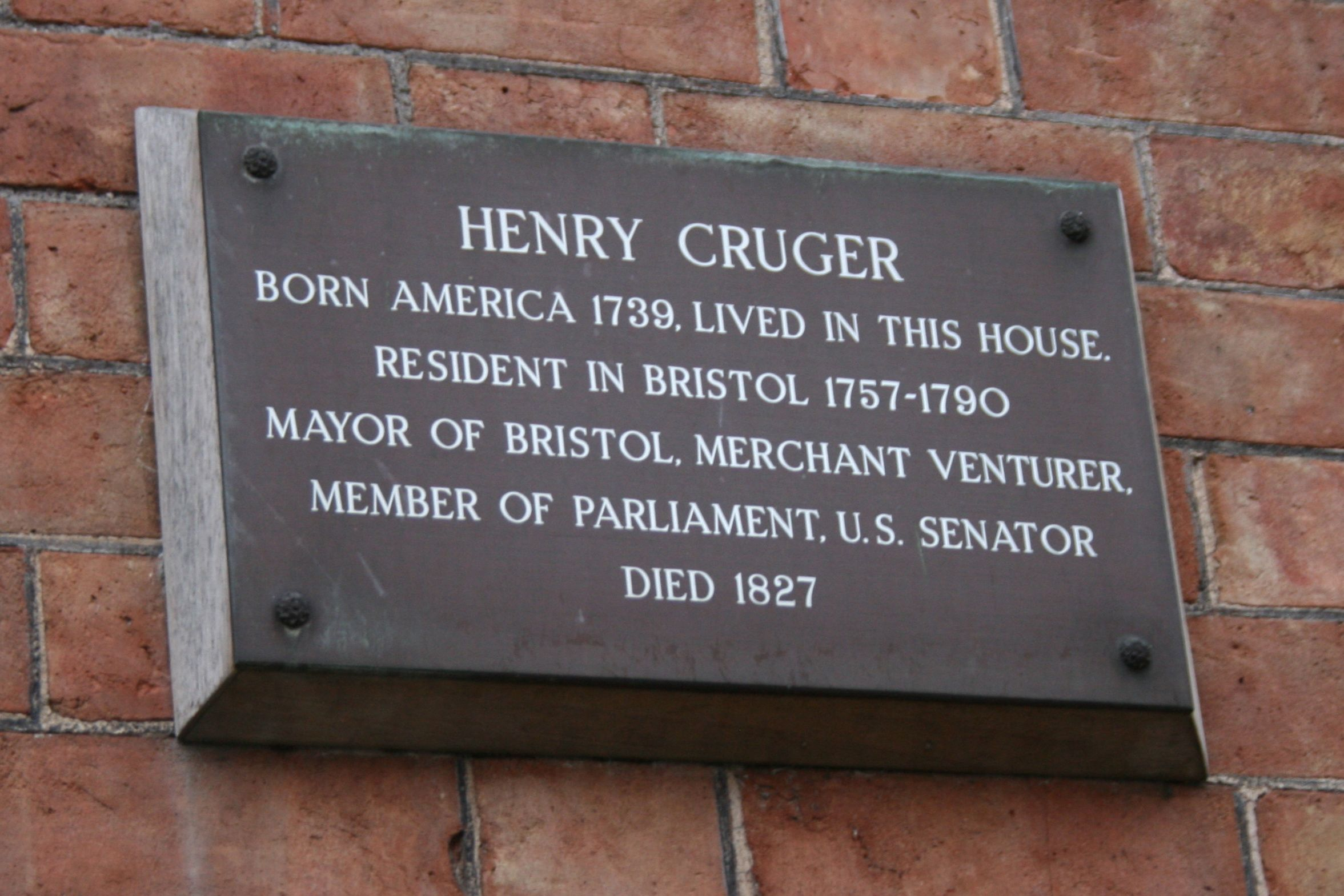
Commemorative plaque to Cruger

Cruger was married three times, firstly in December 1765 to Ellin Hannah Peach, a daughter of Samuel Peach of Tockington a wealthy linen draper and banker. She died in 1767, leaving a son:

- Samuel Peach Cruger (1767–1845), who changed his name to Samuel Peach Peach by 1788 after inheriting his grandfather Samuel's fortune, and home Tockington House, Gloucester. He married Clarissa Partridge, daughter of Charles Partridge of Cotham House, Westbury.

Cruger then married Caroline Elizabeth Blair, with whom he had six children, including:

- Henry H. Cruger, who married his first cousin, Mary Cruger, daughter of Nicolas Cruger.
- William Cruger.
- John Cruger (1774–1812), who married Martha Ramsay (1780–1848).
- Matilda Cruger (1776–1812), who married Lawrence Reid Yates (d. 1796) in 1795. After his death, she married her cousin, Judge Henry Walton, with whom she had six children.

Henry and Elizabeth returned to New York in 1790, where Elizabeth died shortly thereafter. He married for the third time in 1799, when he was age 60, to Caroline Smith. Together, they were the parents of four more children, including:

- Matilda Caroline Cruger (1809–1891), the wife of Thomas Jackson Oakley, a New York State Attorney General and U.S. Representative, in 1831.

Cruger died at home in New York City on April 24, 1827, in his 88th year, and was buried in the Trinity Church Cemetery.

=== Legacy ===
Cruger's house in Park Street, Bristol, on the corner of Great George Street, is marked by a commemorative plaque.

== See also ==
- Peter van Schaack

Parliament of Great Britain
Preceded by Robert Craggs-Nugent; Matthew Brickdale	Member of Parliament for Bristol; 1774–1780; With: Edmund Burke	Succeeded by Matthew Brickdale; Sir Henry Lippincott, Bt
Preceded by Matthew Brickdale; George Daubeny	Member of Parliament for Bristol; 1784–1790; With: Matthew Brickdale	Succeeded by Marquess of Worcester; The Lord Sheffield
