= John Banbury (MP for Bristol) =

English politician

John Banbury (died 1404/5) was an English politician. He sat as MP for Bristol in January 1397 and Mayor of Bristol from Michaelmas 1397 till 1398.

== Political career ==
He also sat as bailiff of Bristol from Michaelmas 1389 till 1390; Sheriff of Bristol from 9 October 1391 till 17 October 1392; and commissioner of gaol delivery in Bristol in February and March 1398.

== Family ==
He married a woman called Joan and had no children.
