= Philip William Skinner Miles =

English Conservative politician

Member of Parliament for Bristol
- In office 22 July 1837 – 10 July 1852 Serving with Henry FitzHardinge Berkeley
- Preceded by: Richard Vyvyan; Philip John Miles
- Succeeded by: Henry FitzHardinge Berkeley; Henry Gore-Langton

Personal details
- Born: 1816 Clifton, Bristol
- Died: 1 October 1881 (aged 64–65) Kingsweston, Bristol
- Party: Conservative

Philip William Skinner Miles (1816 – 1 October 1881), sometimes spelled Skynner Miles, was a British Conservative politician.

He was the son of Bristol Member of Parliament (MP) Philip John Miles and Clarissa née Peach.

Miles was elected a Conservative MP for Bristol at the 1837 general election and held the seat until 1852 when he did not seek re-election.

Miles was appointed High Sheriff of Gloucestershire for 1863. He was Chairman of the Port and Pier Railway Company.

== Family life ==
In Guernsey in 1846 Miles married Pamela Adelaide Napier (1823-1910), daughter of Lieutenant-General Sir William Francis Patrick Napier and Caroline Amelia Fox. They had one child, Philip Napier Miles (1865–1935). Miles died on 1 October 1881 at Kings Weston House aged 65.

Parliament of the United Kingdom
| Preceded by Richard Vyvyan; Philip John Miles | Member of Parliament for Bristol; 1837–1852; With: Henry FitzHardinge Berkeley | Succeeded by Henry FitzHardinge Berkeley; Henry Gore-Langton |
