= Henry Gore-Langton =

British politician

(William) Henry Gore-Langton (1802 – 16 May 1875), was a British Liberal Party politician.

== Background ==
Gore-Langton was a younger son of William Gore-Langton by his second wife Mary, daughter of John Browne.

== Political career ==
Gore-Langton was Mayor of Bristol in 1851 and sat as a Member of Parliament (MP) for Bristol between 1852 and 1865.

== Family ==
Gore-Langton married firstly Maria, daughter of John Lewis, in 1824. They had two sons, William Frederick (born 1839) and Edward Albert (born 1842). After Maria's death in 1864 he married secondly Mary Ann, daughter of William Williams, in 1865. He died in May 1875.

== Sources ==
- Leigh Rayment's Historical List of MPs

Parliament of the United Kingdom
Preceded by Philip William Skinner Miles; Henry FitzHardinge Berkeley	Member of Parliament for Bristol; 1852–1865; With: Henry FitzHardinge Berkeley	Succeeded by Henry FitzHardinge Berkeley; Sir Morton Peto, Bt
