= Robert Yate =

British politician and merchant

Robert Yate (25 April 1643 – 27 October 1737) was an English non-partisan politician and Member of Parliament for Bristol from 1695 - 1710.

== Parliamentary career ==
Yate supported re-establishing the African Company of Merchants.

== Death ==
Yate died in Charlton, Bristol on 27 October 1737, with his burial taking place at Christ Church, Bristol due to his status as a former alderman. He left the majority of his estate to his two nephews.

== Personal life ==
He had a cousin - Joseph Earle - who also served as an MP for Bristol directly after Yate.
