= Edward Davis Protheroe =

British Radical and Whig politician

Member of Parliament for Halifax
- In office 27 July 1837 – 30 July 1847 Serving with Charles Wood
- Preceded by: Charles Wood; James Stuart-Wortley
- Succeeded by: Charles Wood; Henry Edwards

Member of Parliament for Bristol
- In office 30 April 1831 – 14 December 1832 Serving with James Evan Baillie
- Preceded by: Richard Hart Davis; James Evan Baillie
- Succeeded by: James Evan Baillie; Richard Vyvyan

Member of Parliament for Evesham
- In office 16 June 1826 – 4 August 1830 Serving with Charles Cockerell
- Preceded by: Charles Cockerell; William Rouse-Boughton
- Succeeded by: Charles Cockerell; Archibald Kennedy

Personal details
- Born: Edward Protheroe c. 1798
- Died: 18 August 1852 (aged 53–54)
- Party: Radical
- Other political affiliations: Whig
- Parent(s): Edward Protheroe, MP
- Education: Christ Church, Oxford

Edward Davis Protheroe (c. 1798 – 18 August 1852), known as Edward Protheroe until 21 January 1845, was a British Radical and Whig politician.

== Family ==
Protheroe was the son of Edward Protheroe, MP and Anne Waterhouse, daughter of John Waterhouse. In 1817, he was admitted to Christ Church, Oxford, where he matriculated in February at age 18.

In 1845, in accordance with the will of Dame Mary Hill, widow of Mark Davis of Turnwood, from whom he had inherited "considerable property" he adopted the additional surname of Davis. Before his death in 1852, he never married and spent the last three years of his life "paralysed". He left small annuities to his friends, but the majority of his estate transferred to his elderly father.

== Parliamentary career ==
=== Evesham ===
Protheroe was first elected Whig Member of Parliament for the two-member Evesham constituency at the 1826 general election. During the contest against a "token" group of independents, he was accused of trying to "forge" an "unnatural coalition" with the sitting Tory, Sir Charles Cockerell, 1st Baronet. He was returned to the seat, ending the poll in second place out of three candidates.

During this period, Protheroe was a supporter of a range of issues, including Catholic emancipation, the spring guns bill, the Coventry magistracy bill, and the disenfranchisement of the disenfranchisement of Penryn, and acted as a majority teller for the Coventry magistracy bill, all in 1827. He also, in 1828, voted against extending the franchise of East Retford to include Bassetlaw, and supported reducing corn duties. He voted against the appointment of a registrar to the Archbishop of Canterbury, for the usury laws amendment bill and the corporate funds bill in 1828. He was in favour of an amendment to the friendly societies bill which banned "compulsory payments for entertainment" at meeting, and then endorse the anatomy bill.

Protheroe also supported allowing Daniel O'Connell to take his seat at County Clare without taking the Oath of Supremacy. He also supported Lord Blandford's parliamentary reform scheme in 1829, and proposed an amendment on the "need to alleviate distress"—stating "discontent from large masses" and the "growing contempt in which the House is held" could only be reduced by a "decided retrenchment of expense, large reduction of taxation, and by a needful reform, commencing with our own House". This amendment, however, he withdrew that day, noting this was not "from any doubt of the truth" but to ensure "the most expedient course", later voting for a similar amendment moved by Sir Edward Knatchbull, 9th Baronet.

He voted in favour of transferring East Retford's seats to Birmingham, and for the creation of constituencies for Birmingham, Leeds and Manchester.

Protheroe also presented a number of petitions to the House of Commons, including in favour of Catholic relief and emancipation; the repeal of the Test Acts; against the relocation of Smithfield cattle market, plans for which he said were "absurd and ludicrous"; against the burning of Hindu widows on behalf of women of Alcester; to complain of distress from Stow-on-the-Wold; for Jewish emancipation; for the abolition of the death penalty for forgery; and from the Forest of Dean collieries against coal duties. He also supported several inquiries, including to probe electoral interference by Leicester corporation in 1827; obtaining detailed accounts of the work of the public records commissioners in 1828 and 1829; and to investigate chancery delays in 1828.

Protheroe was also almost made a member of the finance committee in 1827, and became a member of Brooks's, sponsored by Lord Essex and Lord Duncannon in 1828. In the latter year, he was appointed to a committee on the borough polls bill and quizzed ministers over their intentions relating to "alteration of the Trinidad laws".

In 1830, he also urged the government to improve the nations public archives, securing returns on the works of commissioners, and accusing existing commissioners of the "grossest blunders" in printing records, then calling for an appointment of an entirely new commission made up of "competent persons of antiquarian taste and research". Later that year, he became a commissioner himself.

In the same year, Protheroe called for opening up St James's Park and Regent's Park, and lamented any "architectural expense" on "extravagance [of] external decorations" in the construction of Pembroke dockyard chapel. He also called for the abolition of the Irish lord lieutenancy and called for interments in London to be moved "to a place distant from the metropolis" due to overcrowding.

=== Bristol ===
By the 1830 general election, Protheroe had already resolved to retire from his seat, instead seeking election at the two-member Bristol constituency—a seat his father had held between 1812 and 1820 and unsuccessfully contested in 1826. However, despite "assurance of support" from "tried friends" of his father, Protheroe junior was unsuccessful, ending third in the poll out of four candidates.

He largely blamed this failure on "formidable opposition from the powerful body of the West Indian interest" and his support for the abolition of slavery. He ignored his advisors and maintained his position, "not by expense, not by interest, not by popular tumult, but by moral strength alone shall the triumph be obtained". During polling, he "stubbornly refused to concede defeat" and was then injured in a riot.

Nevertheless, Protheroe was returned at the next election in 1831, elected unopposed with "unchanged principles" and "undiminished spirit". He declared to support the Grey ministry's parliamentary reform plans, "to vote for the bill, the whole bill, and nothing but the bill"—then dividing for the bill at all stages.

He was then, in 1831, appointed to the select committees for the East India Company and the West Indian colonies. He urged John Cam Hobhouse to reintroduce a bill to open select vestries, and presented a petition from Bristol to be included in such bills, before arguing in support of it and lamenting the "great injustice" from the "evils which must arise" from the "establishment of an unlimited number of beerhouses in the agricultural districts".

Protheroe lost the seat at the next election in 1832.

=== Halifax ===
Protheroe then turned his attention to the two-member Halifax constituency where he was elected as a Radical at the 1835 general election, and held the seat until 1847 when he did not seek re-election.

Parliament of the United Kingdom
Preceded by Charles Cockerell; William Rouse-Boughton	Member of Parliament for Evesham; 1826–1830; With: Charles Cockerell	Succeeded by Charles Cockerell; Archibald Kennedy
Preceded by Richard Hart Davis; James Evan Baillie	Member of Parliament for Bristol; 1831–1832; With: James Evan Baillie	Succeeded by James Evan Baillie; Richard Vyvyan
Preceded by Charles Wood; James Stuart-Wortley	Member of Parliament for Halifax; 1837–1847; With: Charles Wood	Succeeded by Henry Edwards; Charles Wood
