= John Walshe (MP) =

16th-century English politician

John Walshe (died 1572) was an English politician.

He was a member (MP) of the Parliament of England for Cricklade in 1547, Bristol in March 1553, October 1553, April 1554, November 1554, 1555, 1559 and 1563, and for Somerset in 1558.
