= Henry Bright (MP) =

British Whig politician

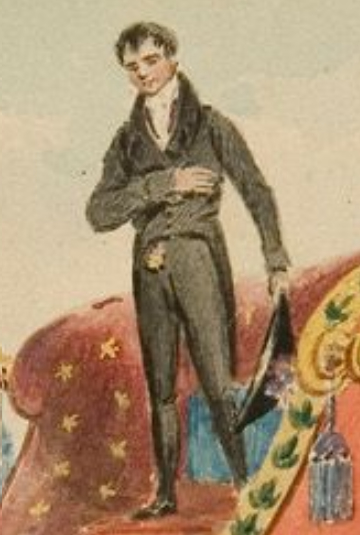
Henry Bright during his Chairing ceremony, Bristol, 1820

Henry Bright (18 January 1784 – 26 March 1869) was a British Whig politician who served as a Member of Parliament for Bristol from 1820 to 1830.

Bright was born in Queen's Square, Bristol on 18 January 1784. He was the oldest son of Richard Bright (1754–1840), a merchant and banker in Bristol, and Sarah née Heywood, and the older brother of the physician Richard Bright, who described Bright's disease. His grandfather was Henry Bright (1715–1777), a Bristol merchant active in the Jamaican slave trade, Mayor of Bristol in 1771–72.

He was educated at Reading School and Peterhouse, Cambridge (admitted 1801, graduated B.A. 1807, M.A. 1810) and elected to a fellowship at Peterhouse in 1810. Admitted to Lincoln's Inn in 1804, he was called to the bar in 1810, practising as a barrister on the western circuit.

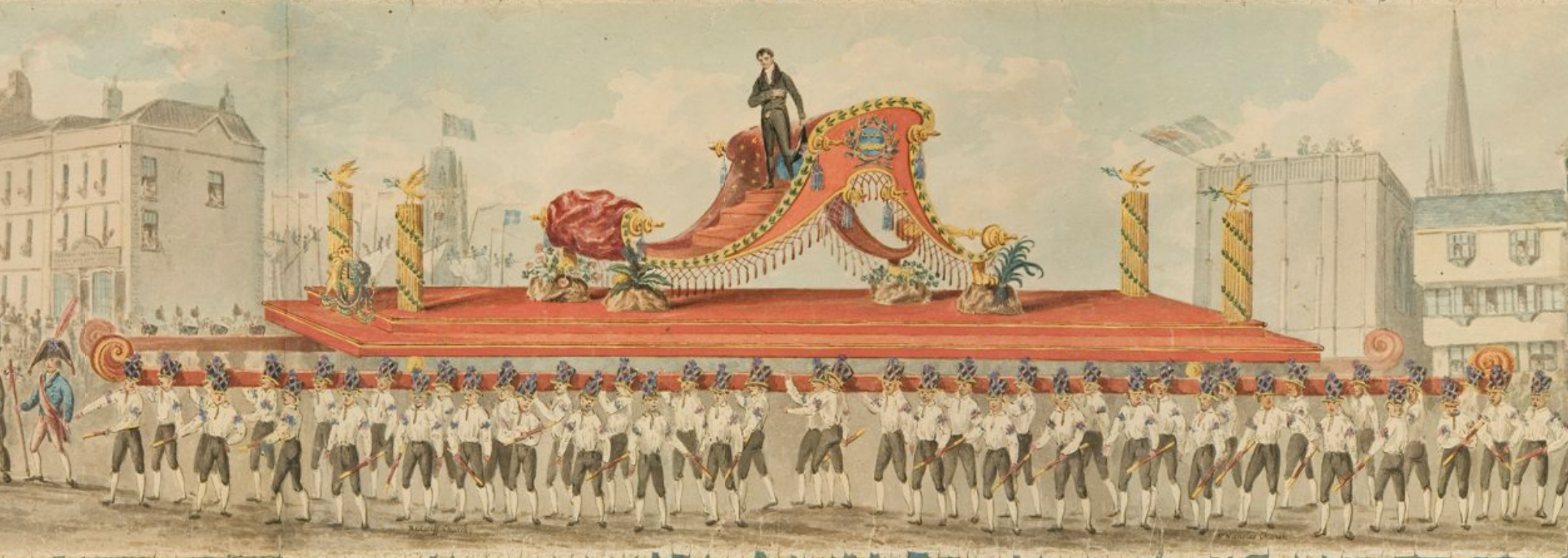
Henry Bright's 'chair' carried on a float during the celebration of his election, 1820

Elected MP for Bristol in 1820 as a Whig in the West India Interest, Bright generally opposed the Tory government of Lord Liverpool. However, he was mindful of constituency considerations, and in May 1820 supported the Western Union Canal bill as "eminently advantageous". The 'chairing' ceremony to celebrate his election was one of the most extravagant ever recorded in the United Kingdom, with Bright carried on an elaborate float as part of huge procession.

The Slave Trade Act 1807 had outlawed the slave trade in the British Empire, but had not abolished slavery. The attitude of Bright's constituents in Bristol is characterised by an anonymous pamphlet letter addressed to Bright in 1823, which argued against the immediate abolition of slavery. Bright was a member of the West India Committee, and of a committee formed in 1823 to resist moves towards emancipation. He complained of "gross exaggerations" in the Southwark anti-slavery petition. After the Slavery Abolition Act 1833, in 1836, Bright collected slave compensation for Edward Smith of the Haughton Pen Estate in Saint Elizabeth Parish, Jamaica.

He was re-elected in 1826 but stood down in 1830, being "tired of it and the expense".

He succeeded to his father's estates in Herefordshire and Hampshire in 1840, inheriting also a one-fifth share of the Jamaican property and a one-seventh share of the residue. Bright died on 26 March 1869.

Parliament of the United Kingdom
Preceded by Richard Hart Davis; Edward Protheroe	Member of Parliament for Bristol; 1820–1830; With: Richard Hart Davis	Succeeded by Richard Hart Davis; James Evan Baillie
