= Henry FitzHardinge Berkeley =

British politician

Francis Henry FitzHardinge Berkeley (7 December 1794 – 10 March 1870) was a British politician.

== Background and education ==
Berkeley was the fourth son of Frederick Berkeley, 5th Earl of Berkeley, and Mary, daughter of William Cole. The validity of his parents' marriage was the subject of some controversy, and in 1811 the House of Lords decided that Berkeley and six of his twelve siblings were born out of wedlock. His brothers included William Berkeley, 1st Earl FitzHardinge, Maurice Berkeley, 1st Baron FitzHardinge, Grantley Berkeley and Craven Berkeley. He was educated at Christ Church, Oxford.

== Political career ==
Berkeley was returned to Parliament as one of two representatives for Bristol in 1837, a seat he held until his death in 1870. He was a longstanding advocate of secret ballot reform, which was finally adopted after his death in 1872.

== Personal life ==
Berkeley died in March 1870, aged 75; his body is buried in St Dunstan's churchyard in Cranford.

Parliament of the United Kingdom
Preceded by Sir Richard Vyvyan, Bt; Philip John Miles	Member of Parliament for Bristol; 1837–1870; With: Philip William Skinner Miles 1837–1852; Henry Gore-Langton 1852–1865; Sir Morton Peto, Bt 1865–1868; John Miles 1868; Samuel Morley 1868–1870	Succeeded by Samuel Morley; Kirkman Daniel Hodgson
