= Bristol (UK Parliament constituency) =

Parliamentary constituency in the United Kingdom, 1801–1885

- Former borough constituency for the House of Commons

1295–1885
- Seats: two
- Replaced by: Bristol East; Bristol North; Bristol South; Bristol West

Bristol was a two-member constituency, used to elect members to the House of Commons in the Parliaments of England (to 1707), Great Britain (1707–1800), and the United Kingdom (from 1801). The constituency existed until Bristol was divided into single member constituencies in 1885.

== Boundaries ==
The historic port city of Bristol is located in what is now the South West Region of England. Until 1373 it straddled the border between the historic geographical counties of Gloucestershire and Somerset, but in 1373 it became a county of its own, entirely separate from its neighbouring counties, by Royal Charter from King Edward III. It was often erroneously accounted as a Gloucestershire borough in the later part of the 19th and the 20th centuries.

The parliamentary borough of Bristol was represented in Parliament from the 13th century, as one of the most important population centres in the Kingdom. Namier and Brooke comment that in 1754 the city was the second largest in the Kingdom and had the third largest electorate for an urban seat.

From the 1885 United Kingdom general election the city was divided into four single member seats. These were Bristol East, Bristol North, Bristol South and Bristol West.

== Members of Parliament ==
The use of Roman numerals in the list below denotes different politicians of the same name, not that the individuals concerned would have used the Roman numerals as part of their name.

Non Partisan denotes that the politician concerned is not known to have been associated with a party (not necessarily that he was not). Whilst Whig and Tory societies in the city continued to nominate candidates in the last half of the 18th century, the electoral labels used in Bristol had very little to do with what the MPs did in national politics.

Year	1st Member	1st Party	2nd Member	2nd Party
1295	John le Taverner			
1298	John le Taverner		John de Cheddre	
1301	John de Malmesbury			
1305	Thomas Welishote		John Hasard	
1306	John le Taverner		Robert de Holhurst	
1307 (Jan)	Geoffrey Comper		Nicholas Coker	
1309	Stephen de Bello Monte		Robert Martyn	
1311 (Aug)	Richard Colpeck		John Fraunceys	
1311 (Nov)	John Haszard		John le Lun	
1313 (Mar)	John de Wellescoten		John Methelan	
1313 (Sep)	John Fraunceys		John Tropyn	
1315	Robert Wyldemersh		Thomas le Spicer	
1316 (Jan)	Nicholas de Roubergwe		John Veys	
1318	Gilbert Pickering		Richard de Woodhall	
1319	Thomas de Salop		Robert de Lyncoln	
1320	John le Hunte		John Welishote	
1321	John de Romeneye		William de Hanyngfeld	
1322 (May)	William de Clyf		John Fraunceys jnr (son of 1311)	
1322 (Nov)	John le Taverner		John Fraunceys jnr	
1324 (Jan)	John de Axebridge		John Fraunceys jnr	
1325	John de Axebridge		John Fraunceys jnr	
1327	John de Axebridge		John de Romeneye	
1328 (Feb)	Richard de Panes		Hugh le Hunte	
1328 (Apr)	William de Trowbridge		Hugh de Langebridge	
1330 (Mar)	John Fraunceys		Hugh le Hunte	
1330 (Nov)	Hugh le Hunte		Richard de Panes	
1332 (Mar)	John de Romeneye		John de Axebridge	
1332 (Sep)	Hugh de Langebridge		John de Axebridge	
1332 (Dec)	Richard de Chelreye		John Fraunceys snr	
1334 (Feb)	John Otery		John de Strete	
1334 (Sep)	Robert Gyene or Gwyen			
1335	Hugh de Langebridge		John de Strete	
1336 (Mar)	Robert de Gyn or de Gyeyn		John Franceys	
1336 (Sep)	John Fraunceys jnr		Thomas Tropin	
1336 (Dec)	Hugh de Langebridge		John le Spycer; William le Haukare	
1337 (Jan)	Robert de Gyene		John de Strete	
1338 (Jan)	Everard le Fraunceys		Philip de Torynton	
1338 (Jul)	Everard le Fraunceys		Philip de Torynton	
1339 (Jan)	Everard le Fraunceys		John de Strete	
1340 (Jan)	Thomas Tropyn		John le Spicer	
1341	Robert Guyene		Philip de Toryton	
1344	Roger Turtle		John de Horncastle	
1346 (Sep)	John de Wycoumbe		John Neel	
1348 (Jan)	Everard Fraunceys or le Freynshe		John de Strete	
1348 (Mar)	Everard le Fraunceys		Thomas de Lodelawe	
1351	John de Colyngton or Cobbington		John Seymour	
1353	Thomas Babbecary		William Coumbe	
1354	Richard le Spicer		Reginald le French	
1358	Reginald French		Richard Brompton	
1360	Thomas Babbecari		Galfridus Beauflour (Geoffrey Beauflower)	
1361	Reginald le French		William Yonge	
1362	Walter Frompton		Edmund Blanket	
1363	John Serjaunt		John Stoke	
1365	William Haye		William Cannings	
1366	William Somerwell		Thomas Denbaud	
1368	Richard Chaimburleyn		Richard Sydenham	
1369	Robert Cheddre		Edmund Blanket	
1371 (Jun)	John Bathe			
1372	Walter Derby		John Stoke	
1373	Walter Derby		Thomas Beaupyne or Beaupenny	
1377 (Jan)	Ehas Spelly		Thomas Beaupyne or Beaupenny	
1378	Thomas Beaupyne		Walter de Frompton	
1381	Elias Spelly		John Stokes	
1382 (May)	Thomas Beaupyne		John Viell	
1382 (Oct)	Walter Derby		John Fullbroke	
1383 (Feb)	William I Canynges (d.1396)		John Candavere	
1383 (Oct)	John Canynges (d.1405)		William Frome	
1384 (Apr)	William I Canynges (d.1396)		William Somerwell	
1384 (Nov)	Elias Spelly		Walter Tedistill (Tyddeley?)	
1385	Elias Spelly		Thomas Knapp	
1386	Elias Spelly		William I Canynges (d.1396)	
1388 (Feb)	Thomas Beaupyne		Thomas Knapp	
1388 (Sep)	Robert Gardiner		John Fulbrook	
1390 (Jan)	John Viell		William Frome	
1391	William Frome		John Stephens	
1393	Thomas Beaupyne		John Stephens	
1397 (Jan)	William Frome		John Banbury	
1399	Thomas Norton		Richard Pavys or Pannys	
1402	Thomas Norton		John Droyes	
1406	Henry Bokerell		Gilbert Joce	
1407 (Oct)	John Droys, merchant		John Newton, merchant	
1411 (Oct)	Thomas Norton		David Dudbroke	
1413 (Apr)	Thomas Norton		John Leycester	
1414 (Jan)	Thomas Young		John Spyne	
1414 (Oct)	Thomas Blount, merchant		John Clyve, merchant	
1416 (Feb)	Robert Russell		Robert Colville	
1417 (Oct)	Thomas Norton		John Burton	
1419 (Sep)	Robert Russell		Mark William	
1420 (Nov)	Thomas Norton		John Spyne	
1421 (Mar)	Thomas Norton		Henry Gildeney	
1421 (Nov)	Mark William		Richard Trenode	
1422 (Oct)	John Burton		Roger Lyveden or Lavindon	
1423 (Oct)	John Burton		Roger Leveden or Lavindon	
1425 (Mar)	Richard Trenode		Walter Power or Powell	
1426 (Feb)	Henry Gildeney		John Langley	
1427 (Sep)	John Burton		Henry Gildeney	
1429 (Sep)	Richard Trenode		John Sharp	
1430 (Dec)	Thomas Fish		Walter Power or Powell	
1432 (Apr)	John Burton		John Sharp	
1433 (Jun)	Robert Russell		Walter Power	
1435 (Sep)	Thomas Fisshe		Thomas Young (d.1476)	
1436 (Dec)	Thomas Young (d.1476)		Thomas Norton jnr	
1439	William II Canynges (d.1474)			
1442 (Jan)	Thomas Young (d.1476)		John Sharp	
1447 (Jan)	Thomas Young (d.1476)		John Sharp, jnr (son of John Sharp 1429)	
1449 (Jan)	Thomas Young (d.1476)		John Sharp, jnr	
1449 (Nov)	Thomas Young (d.1476)		John Sharp, jnr	
1450 (Oct)	Thomas Young (d.1476)		William II Canynges (d.1474)	
1453 (Feb)	John Shipward		William Pa(vy?)	
1455 (Jul)	Thomas Young (d.1476)		William II Canynges (d.1474)	
1459 (Nov)	John Shipward		Philip Mede	
1460 (Sep)	John Shipward		Philip Mede	
1462	Thomas Meede			
1467 (Apr)	William Spencer		John Bagot	
1472 (Aug)	John Twynyho		John Bagot	
1478 (Jan)	John Hawkes		Edmund Westcote	
1483 (Jan)	Edmund Westcote		William Wykam	
1484 (Jan)	John Twynyho		Robert Strange	
1485 (Oct)	John Esterfield		Robert Strange (MP for Bristol)	
1487 (Oct)	John Esterfield		Henry Vaughan	
1490 (Jan)	William Toker		John Fisher	
1491 (Oct)	John Syram™ (or Seymour?)		John Pynke	
1495 (Oct)	Henry Vaughan		Philip Kingston	
1505	Henry Dale		Thomas Snigg	
1510 )Jan)	Richard Vaughan		Henry Dale	
1512 (Jan)	Thomas Smith		Richard Hobby	
1523 (Apr)	Robert Thorn		Richard Hobby	
1529	Thomas Jubbes		Richard Abingdon	
1536	Nicholas Thorn		Roger Coke	
1539	Thomas White		David Broke^{1}	
1541	David Broke		Robert Elyot	
1545	Robert Keilway		John Drewes	
1553	John Walshe		David Harris	
1554	John Walshe		Thomas Lansden	
1555	John Walshe		William Chester	
1558	William Tyndall		Robert Butler	
1559	John Walshe		William Carr	
1563	John Walshe, made judge, repl. by Thomas Chester		William Carr	
1571	John Popham		Philip Langley	
1584	Thomas Hanham		Richard Cole	
1586	Thomas Hanham		Thomas Aldworth	
1588	Thomas Hanham		William Saltern	
1593	Thomas Hanham		Richard Cole	
1597	George Snigge made Baron of the Court of Exchequer and replaced 1605 by John Whitson		William Ellys	
1601	George Snigge made Baron of the Court of Exchequer and replaced 1605 by John Whitson		John Hopkins	Non Partisan
1604	George Snigge made Baron of the Court of Exchequer and replaced 1605 by John Whitson		Thomas James	Non Partisan
1614	John Whitson	Non Partisan	Thomas James	Non Partisan
1621	John Barker	Non-Partisan	John Guy	Non Partisan
1624	John Barker	Non Partisan	John Guy	Non Partisan
1625	Nicholas Hyde	Non Partisan	John Whitson	Non Partisan
1626	John Whitson	Non Partisan	John Doughty	Non Partisan
1628	John Doughty	Non Partisan	John Barker	Non Partisan
1640 (Mar)	John Glanville	Non Partisan	Humphrey Hooke	Non Partisan
1640 (Oct)	Humphrey Hooke	Non Partisan	Richard Longe	Non Partisan
1642	John Glanville	Non Partisan	John Tailer	Non Partisan
1646	Richard Aldworth	Non Partisan	Luke Hodges	Non Partisan
1654	Richard Aldworth	Non Partisan	Miles Jackson	Non Partisan
1656	Robert Aldworth	Non Partisan	John Dodderidge; Miles Jackson	Non Partisan
1659	Robert Aldworth	Non Partisan	Joseph Jackson	Non Partisan
1660	John Stephens	Non Partisan	Sir John Knight	Non Partisan
1661	The Earl of Ossory ^{2}	Non Partisan	Sir John Knight	Non Partisan
1666	Sir Humphrey Hooke ^{3}	Non Partisan	Sir John Knight	Non Partisan
1678	Sir Robert Cann	Non Partisan	Sir John Knight	Non Partisan
1681	Thomas Earle	Non Partisan	Sir John Knight	Non Partisan
1681	Thomas Earle	Non Partisan	Sir Richard Hart	Non Partisan
1685	Sir John Churchill ^{4}	Non Partisan	Sir Richard Crumpe	Non Partisan
1685	Sir Richard Hart	Non Partisan	Sir Richard Crumpe	Non Partisan
1689	Sir Richard Hart	Non Partisan	Sir John Knight II	Non Partisan
1695	Sir Thomas Day	Non Partisan	Robert Yate	Non Partisan
1701	Sir William Daines	Non Partisan	Robert Yate	Non Partisan
1710	Edward Colston	Tory	Joseph Earle	Non Partisan
1713	Thomas Edwards	Non Partisan	Joseph Earle	Non Partisan
1715	Sir William Daines	Non Partisan	Joseph Earle	Non Partisan
1722	Sir Abraham Elton, Bt I	Non Partisan	Joseph Earle	Non Partisan
1727	John Scrope	Non Partisan	Sir Abraham Elton, Bt II ^{6}	Non Partisan
1734	Thomas Coster ^{5}	Non Partisan	Sir Abraham Elton, Bt II ^{6}	Non Partisan
1739	Edward Southwell	Non Partisan	Sir Abraham Elton, Bt II ^{6}	Non Partisan
1742	Edward Southwell	Non Partisan	Robert Hoblyn	Non Partisan
1754	Robert Craggs-Nugent (later The Viscount Clare) ^{8}	Whig	Richard Beckford ^{7}	Tory
1756	Robert Craggs-Nugent (later The Viscount Clare) ^{8}	Whig	Jarrit Smith	Tory
1768	Robert Craggs-Nugent (later The Viscount Clare) ^{8}	Whig	Matthew Brickdale	Tory
1774	Henry Cruger	Whig	Edmund Burke	Whig
1780	Matthew Brickdale	Tory	Sir Henry Lippincott, Bt ^{9}	Tory
1781	Matthew Brickdale	Tory	George Daubeny	Tory
1784	Matthew Brickdale	Tory	Henry Cruger	Whig
1790	Marquess of Worcester	Tory	The Lord Sheffield ^{10}	Whig
1796	Charles Bragge (later Charles Bragge Bathurst) ^{11}	Tory	The Lord Sheffield ^{10}	Whig
1802	Charles Bragge (later Charles Bragge Bathurst) ^{11}	Tory	Evan Baillie	Whig
1812	Richard Hart Davis	Tory	Evan Baillie	Whig
1812	Richard Hart Davis	Tory	Edward Protheroe I	Whig
1820	Richard Hart Davis	Tory	Henry Bright	Whig
1830	Richard Hart Davis	Tory	James Evan Baillie	Whig
1831	Edward Protheroe II	Whig	James Evan Baillie	Whig
1832	Sir Richard Vyvyan, Bt	Tory	James Evan Baillie	Whig
1834	Sir Richard Vyvyan, Bt	Conservative	James Evan Baillie	Whig
1835	Sir Richard Vyvyan, Bt	Conservative	Philip John Miles	Conservative
1837	Philip William Skinner Miles	Conservative	Henry FitzHardinge Berkeley ^{13}	Radical
1852	Henry Gore-Langton	Whig	Henry FitzHardinge Berkeley ^{13}	Radical
1859	Henry Gore-Langton	Liberal	Henry FitzHardinge Berkeley ^{13}	Liberal
1865	Sir Morton Peto ^{12}	Liberal	Henry FitzHardinge Berkeley ^{13}	Liberal
1868	John Miles	Conservative	Henry FitzHardinge Berkeley ^{13}	Liberal
1868	Samuel Morley	Liberal	Henry FitzHardinge Berkeley ^{13}	Liberal
1870	Samuel Morley	Liberal	Elisha Smith Robinson ^{14}	Liberal
1870	Samuel Morley	Liberal	Kirkman Hodgson ^{12}	Liberal
1878	Samuel Morley	Liberal	Lewis Fry	Liberal
1885	constituency divided. See Bristol East, Bristol North, Bristol South and Bristol West.			

Notes:-

- ^{1} By 4 February 1536 David Broke had been elected vice Thomas Jubbes deceased. He was probably re-elected in the 1536 general election and certainly was at the 1539 and 1542 elections..
- ^{2} A Peer of Ireland. He was created a Peer of England, as 1st Baron Butler, in 1666.
- ^{3} Died 16 October 1677.
- ^{4} Died 11 October 1685.
- ^{5} Died 30 September 1739.
- ^{6} Died 20 October 1742.
- ^{7} Died 24 January 1756.
- ^{8} Created a Peer of Ireland, as 1st Viscount Clare, in 1767.
- ^{9} Died 30 December 1780.
- ^{10} A Peer of Ireland, as 1st Baron Sheffield, created in 1781.
- ^{11} Adopted a new surname of Bathurst, in 1804.
- ^{12} Resigned.
- ^{13} Died 10 March 1870.
- ^{14} Election declared void on petition.

== Elections ==
During the existence of this constituency, Bristol was a city with the status of being a county of itself. That meant that the city was not subject to the administration of the officials of the geographic counties in which it was situated. In electoral terms it meant that the voters for the parliamentary borough included those qualified on the same 40 shilling freeholder franchise as that for a county constituency. Other electors qualified as freemen of the borough. These were the ancient right franchises, applicable to Bristol, preserved by the Reform Act 1832, which also introduced a broader occupation franchise for all borough constituencies.

Bristol was a fairly partisan constituency in the eighteenth century with two rival clubs - the Union Club for the Whigs and the Steadfast Society for the Tories.

The bloc vote electoral system was used in two seat elections and first past the post for single member by-elections. Each voter had up to as many votes as there were seats to be filled. Votes had to be cast by a spoken declaration, in public, at the hustings (until the secret ballot was introduced in 1872).

Namier and Brooke, in The House of Commons 1754-1790, estimated the electorate of Bristol to number about 5,000. When registration of electors was introduced in 1832 the city had 10,315 names on the electoral register.

Note on percentage change calculations: Where there was only one candidate of a party in successive elections, for the same number of seats, change is calculated on the party percentage vote. Where there was more than one candidate, in one or both successive elections for the same number of seats, then change is calculated on the individual percentage vote.

Note on sources: The information for the election results given below is taken from Sedgwick 1715–1754, Namier and Brooke 1754–1790, Stooks Smith 1790-1832 and from Craig thereafter. Where Stooks Smith gives additional information or differs from the other sources this is indicated in a note after the result.

1710s – 1720s – 1730s – 1740s – 1750s – 1760s – 1770s – 1780s – 1790s – 1800s – 1810s – 1820s – 1830s – 1840s – 1850s – 1860s – 1870s – 1880s

=== Elections in the 1710s ===
General election 9 February 1715: Bristol (2 seats)
Party	Candidate	Votes	%	±%
Whig	William Daines	1,936	24.87	N/A
Whig	Joseph Earle	1,879	24.14	N/A
Tory	Philip Freke	1,991	25.58	N/A
Tory	Thomas Edwards	1,978	25.41	N/A

- Note (1715): Although the Whig candidates received fewer votes than the Tory ones, the Returning Officer declared them elected and the House of Commons did not hear the petitions against the return; so Daines and Earle continued to sit throughout the Parliament.

=== Elections in the 1720s ===
General election 28 March 1722: Bristol (2 seats)
Party	Candidate	Votes	%	±%
Whig	Joseph Earle	2,141	37.22	+13.08
Whig	Abraham Elton	1,869	32.49	N/A
Tory	William Hart	1,743	30.30	N/A

General election 8 September 1727: Bristol (2 seats)
Party	Candidate	Votes	%	±%
Whig	John Scrope	Unopposed	N/A	N/A
Whig	Abraham Elton	Unopposed	N/A	N/A

- Note (1727): William Hart (Tory) was a candidate, but he did not go to a poll after Mr Elton paid him £1,000 to cover his election expenses.
- Elton became the 2nd Baronet, upon the death of his father (the MP of the same name elected in 1722) in 1728.

=== Elections in the 1730s ===
General election 24 May 1734: Bristol (2 seats)
Party	Candidate	Votes	%	±%
Whig	Abraham Elton	2,428	38.15	N/A
Tory	Thomas Coster	2,071	32.54	N/A
Whig	John Scrope	1,866	29.32	N/A

- Death of Coster

By-Election 12 December 1739: Bristol
Party	Candidate	Votes	%	±%
Whig	Edward Southwell	2,651	54.61	N/A
Non Partisan	Henry Combe	2,203	45.39	N/A
Majority		448	9.23	N/A
Whig gain from Tory		Swing	N/A	

- Note (1759): Southwell was an Opposition Whig

=== Elections in the 1740s ===
General election 13 May 1741: Bristol (2 seats)
Party	Candidate	Votes	%	±%
Whig	Abraham Elton	Unopposed	N/A	N/A
Whig	Edward Southwell	Unopposed	N/A	N/A

- Death of Elton

By-Election 24 November 1742: Bristol
Party	Candidate	Votes	%	±%
Tory	Robert Hoblyn	Unopposed	N/A	N/A
Tory gain from Whig		Swing	N/A	

General election 1 July 1747: Bristol (2 seats)
Party	Candidate	Votes	%	±%
Whig	Edward Southwell	Unopposed	N/A	N/A
Tory	Robert Hoblyn	Unopposed	N/A	N/A

=== Elections in the 1750s ===
General election 1 May 1754: Bristol (2 seats)
Party	Candidate	Votes	%	±%
Whig	Robert Nugent	2,592	37.04	N/A
Tory	Richard Beckford	2,245	32.09	N/A
Tory	John Philipps	2,160	30.87	N/A

- Note (1754): Nugent 2,601; Philips 2,165. (Source: Stooks Smith)
- Death of Beckford

By-Election 18 March 1756: Bristol
Party	Candidate	Votes	%	±%
Tory	Jarrit Smith	2,418	50.75	N/A
Whig	John Spencer	2,347	49.25	N/A
Majority		71	1.49	N/A
Tory hold		Swing	N/A	

- Seat vacated by appointment of Craggs-Nugent as a Vice Treasurer of Ireland

By-Election 26 December 1759: Bristol
Party	Candidate	Votes	%	±%
Whig	Robert Nugent	Unopposed	N/A	N/A
Whig hold		Swing	N/A	

=== Elections in the 1760s ===
General election 27 March 1761: Bristol (2 seats)
Party	Candidate	Votes	%	±%
Whig	Robert Nugent	Unopposed	N/A	N/A
Tory	Jarrit Smith	Unopposed	N/A	N/A

- Seat vacated by appointment of Craggs-Nugent as First Commissioner of the Board of Trade and Plantations

By-Election 16 December 1766: Bristol
Party	Candidate	Votes	%	±%
Whig	Robert Nugent	Unopposed	N/A	N/A
Whig hold		Swing	N/A	

- Creation of Craggs-Nugent as the 1st Viscount Clare, in the Peerage of Ireland, in 1767

General election 16 March 1768: Bristol (2 seats)
Party	Candidate	Votes	%	±%
Whig	Robert Nugent	Unopposed	N/A	N/A
Tory	Matthew Brickdale	Unopposed	N/A	N/A

- Seat vacated by appointment of Viscount Clare as a Vice Treasurer of Ireland

By-Election 27 June 1768: Bristol
Party	Candidate	Votes	%	±%
Whig	Robert Nugent	Unopposed	N/A	N/A
Whig hold		Swing	N/A	

=== Elections in the 1770s ===
General election 3 November 1774: Bristol (2 seats)
Party	Candidate	Votes	%	±%
Whig	Henry Cruger	3,565	39.56	N/A
Whig	Edmund Burke	2,707	30.04	N/A
Tory	Matthew Brickdale	2,456	27.26	N/A
Whig	Robert Nugent	283	3.14	N/A

- Note (1774): 5,384 voted. Lord Clare resigned on the second day when Mr. Burke was first proposed. Mr. Burke was at the time in Malton, for which place he had been returned when the deputation arrived to invite him to Bristol, where he arrived on the sixth day's poll. (Source: Stooks Smith)

=== Elections in the 1780s ===
General election 20 September 1780: Bristol (2 seats)
Party	Candidate	Votes	%	±%
Tory	Matthew Brickdale	2,771	37.62	+10.36
Tory	Henry Lippincott	2,518	34.18	N/A
Whig	Henry Cruger	1,271	17.25	−22.31
Whig	Samuel Peach	788	10.70	N/A
Whig	Edmund Burke	18	0.24	−29.80

- Note (1780): Lippincott 3,518; Burke 0. Mr. Rich. Combe, late member of Aldeburgh, was a Candidate, but died the day before the commencement of the poll. (Source: Stooks Smith)
- Death of Lippincott

By-Election 26 February 1781: Bristol
Party	Candidate	Votes	%	±%
Tory	George Daubeny	3,143	53.15	N/A
Whig	Henry Cruger	2,771	46.85	N/A
Majority		372	6.29	N/A
Tory hold		Swing	N/A	

General election 10 May 1784: Bristol (2 seats)
Party	Candidate	Votes	%	±%
Tory	Matthew Brickdale	3,458	35.05	−2.57
Whig	Henry Cruger	3,052	30.93	+13.68
Tory	George Daubeny	2,984	30.24	N/A
Whig	Samuel Peach	373	3.73	−6.97

- Note (1784): 6,094 voted. (Source: Stooks Smith)

=== Elections in the 1790s ===
General election 1790: Bristol (2 seats)
Party	Candidate	Votes	%	±%
Tory	Henry Somerset	544	49.54	N/A
Whig	John Baker-Holroyd	537	48.91	N/A
Non Partisan	-. Lewis	12	1.09	N/A
Non Partisan	William Cunningham	5	0.46	N/A

General election 1796: Bristol (2 seats)
Party	Candidate	Votes	%	±%
Tory	Charles Bragge	364	44.83	−4.71
Whig	John Baker-Holroyd	340	41.87	−7.04
Whig	Benjamin Hobhouse	108	13.30	N/A

- Note (1796): Poll 1 day. (Source: Stooks Smith)

=== Elections in the 1800s ===
- Members of the last Parliament of Great Britain, continued in office for the first Parliament of the United Kingdom from 1 January 1801

Co-option 1801: Bristol (2 seats)
Party	Candidate	Votes	%	±%
Tory	Charles Bragge	Co-opted	N/A	N/A
Whig	John Baker-Holroyd	Co-opted	N/A	N/A

- Seat vacated on the appointment of Bragge as Treasurer of the Navy

By-Election November 1801: Bristol
Party	Candidate	Votes	%	±%
Tory	Charles Bragge	Unopposed	N/A	N/A
Tory hold		Swing	N/A	

General election 1802: Bristol (2 seats)
Party	Candidate	Votes	%	±%
Tory	Charles Bragge	Unopposed	N/A	N/A
Whig	Evan Baillie	Unopposed	N/A	N/A

- Note (1802): Sir Frederick Eden was a candidate, but retired before the election. (Source: Stooks Smith)
- Seat vacated on the appointment of Bragge as Secretary at War

By-Election August 1803: Bristol
Party	Candidate	Votes	%	±%
Tory	Charles Bragge	Unopposed	N/A	N/A
Tory hold		Swing	N/A	

- Bragge changed his surname to Bathurst in 1804

General election 1806: Bristol (2 seats)
Party	Candidate	Votes	%	±%
Tory	Charles Bathurst	Unopposed	N/A	N/A
Whig	Evan Baillie	Unopposed	N/A	N/A

General election 1807: Bristol (2 seats)
Party	Candidate	Votes	%	±%
Tory	Charles Bathurst	Unopposed	N/A	N/A
Whig	Evan Baillie	Unopposed	N/A	N/A

=== Elections in the 1810s ===
- Seat vacated on the appointment of Bathurst as Chancellor of the Duchy of Lancaster on 23 June 1812

By-Election July 1812: Bristol
Party	Candidate	Votes	%	±%
Tory	Richard Hart Davis	1,907	89.03	N/A
Radical	Henry Hunt	235	10.97	N/A
Radical	William Cobbett	0	0.00	N/A
Majority		1,672	78.06	N/A
Tory hold		Swing	N/A	

- Note (1812 by-election): Poll 13 days; 2,142 electors voted. (Source: Stooks Smith)

General election 1812: Bristol (2 seats)
Party	Candidate	Votes	%	±%
Tory	Richard Hart Davis	2,910	39.24	N/A
Whig	Edward Protheroe	2,435	32.84	N/A
Whig	Samuel Romilly	1,615	21.78	N/A
Radical	Henry Hunt	455	6.14	N/A

- Note (1812): Poll 10 days; 4,389 electors cast 7,415 votes. (Source: Stooks Smith)

General election 1818: Bristol (2 seats)
Party	Candidate	Votes	%	±%
Tory	Richard Hart Davis	3,377	46.13	+6.89
Whig	Edward Protheroe	2,259	30.86	−1.98
Whig	Hugh Duncan Baillie	1,684	23.01	+23.01

- Note (1818): Poll 5 days; 4,121 electors cast 7,320 votes. (Source: Stooks Smith)

=== Elections in the 1820s ===
General election 1820: Bristol (2 seats)
Party	Candidate	Votes	%	±%
Whig	Henry Bright	2,975	50.45	+50.45
Tory	Richard Hart Davis	2,795	47.40	+1.27
Whig	Hugh Duncan Baillie	127	2.15	−20.86

General election 1826: Bristol (2 seats)
Party	Candidate	Votes	%	±%
Tory	Richard Hart Davis	3,887	48.14	+0.74
Whig	Henry Bright	2,314	28.66	−21.79
Whig	Edward Protheroe	1,874	23.21	+23.21

=== Elections in the 1830s ===
General election 1830: Bristol (2 seats)
Party	Candidate	Votes	%	±%
Tory	Richard Hart Davis	5,012	44.6	
Whig	James Evan Baillie	3,378	30.1	
Whig	Edward Davis Protheroe	2,842	25.3	
Radical	James Acland	8	0.0	
Turnout		6,311		
Majority		1,634	14.5	
Tory hold		Swing		
Majority		3,370	30.1	
Whig hold		Swing		

- Note (1830): Poll 4 days (Source: Stooks Smith)

General election 1831: Bristol (2 seats)
Party	Candidate	Votes	%	±%
Whig	James Evan Baillie	Unopposed		
Whig	Edward Davis Protheroe	Unopposed		
Whig hold				
Whig gain from Tory				

General election 14 December 1832: Bristol (2 seats)
Party	Candidate	Votes	%	±%
Tory	Richard Vyvyan	3,697	29.3	New
Whig	James Evan Baillie	3,159	25.0	N/A
Whig	Edward Davis Protheroe	3,030	24.0	N/A
Whig	John Williams	2,741	21.7	N/A
Majority		538	5.3	N/A
Turnout		6,631	64.3	N/A
Registered electors		10,315		
Tory gain from Whig		Swing	N/A	
Whig hold		Swing	N/A	

General election 9 January 1835: Bristol (2 seats)
Party	Candidate	Votes	%	±%
Conservative	Philip John Miles	3,709	32.7	+18.1
Conservative	Richard Vyvyan	3,313	29.2	+14.6
Whig	James Evan Baillie	2,518	22.2	−48.5
Radical	John Hobhouse	1,808	15.9	N/A
Majority		1,191	10.5	N/A
Turnout		5,879	58.2	−6.1
Registered electors		10,100		
Conservative hold		Swing	+21.2	
Conservative gain from Whig		Swing	+19.4	

General election 22 July 1837: Bristol (2 seats)
Party	Candidate	Votes	%	±%
Conservative	Philip William Skinner Miles	3,839	37.6	+4.9
Radical	Henry FitzHardinge Berkeley	3,212	31.5	+15.6
Conservative	William Fripp	3,156	30.9	+1.7
Turnout		6,375	63.8	+5.6
Registered electors		9,992		
Majority		627	6.1	−0.9
Conservative hold		Swing	−1.5	
Majority		56	0.6	N/A
Radical gain from Conservative		Swing	+4.5	

=== Elections in the 1840s ===
General election 28 June 1841: Bristol (2 seats)
Party	Candidate	Votes	%	±%
Conservative	Philip William Skinner Miles	4,193	36.1	−1.5
Radical	Henry FitzHardinge Berkeley	3,739	32.2	+0.7
Conservative	William Fripp	3,684	31.7	+0.8
Turnout		5,808 (est)	52.1 (est)	−11.7
Registered electors		11,150		
Majority		454	3.9	−2.2
Conservative hold		Swing	+0.9	
Majority		55	0.5	−0.1
Radical hold		Swing	+0.7	

General election 1847: Bristol (2 seats)
Party	Candidate	Votes	%	±%
Radical	Henry FitzHardinge Berkeley	4,381	45.5	+29.4
Conservative	Philip William Skinner Miles	2,595	27.0	−9.1
Conservative	William Fripp	2,476	25.7	−6.0
Radical	Apsley Pellatt	171	1.8	−14.3
Turnout		6,913	62.7	+10.6
Registered electors		11,032		
Majority		1,786	18.5	+18.0
Radical hold		Swing	+18.5	
Majority		2,424	25.2	+21.3
Conservative hold		Swing	−8.3	

=== Elections in the 1850s ===
General election 10 July 1852: Bristol (2 seats)
Party	Candidate	Votes	%	±%
Radical	Henry FitzHardinge Berkeley	4,681	36.4	−10.9
Whig	Henry Gore-Langton	4,531	35.3	N/A
Conservative	Foster Alleyne McGeachy	3,632	28.3	−24.4
Turnout		6,422 (est)	51.2 (est)	−11.5
Registered electors		12,548		
Majority		150	1.1	−17.4
Radical hold		Swing	+6.8	
Majority		899	7.0	N/A
Whig gain from Conservative		Swing	N/A	

- Note (1852): From this election the number of electors who voted is unknown, so the number of votes cast is divided by two, and the resultant figure is used to calculate an estimated minimum turnout. To the extent that electors did not cast both their possible votes the turnout figure will be an underestimate.

General election 27 March 1857: Bristol (2 seats)
Party	Candidate	Votes	%	±%
Radical	Henry FitzHardinge Berkeley	Unopposed		
Whig	Henry Gore-Langton	Unopposed		
Registered electors		12,612		
Radical hold				
Whig hold				

General election 30 April 1859: Bristol (2 seats)
Party	Candidate	Votes	%	±%
Liberal	Henry FitzHardinge Berkeley	4,432	34.3	N/A
Liberal	Henry Gore-Langton	4,285	33.2	N/A
Conservative	Frederick William Slade	4,205	32.5	New
Majority		80	0.7	N/A
Turnout		6,461 (est)	50.0 (est)	N/A
Registered electors		12,929		
Liberal hold		Swing	N/A	
Liberal hold		Swing	N/A	

=== Elections in the 1860s ===
General election 15 July 1865: Bristol (2 seats)
Party	Candidate	Votes	%	±%
Liberal	Henry FitzHardinge Berkeley	5,296	35.8	+1.5
Liberal	Morton Peto	5,228	35.3	+2.1
Conservative	Thomas Fremantle	4,269	28.9	−3.6
Majority		959	6.5	+5.8
Turnout		9,531 (est)	84.3 (est)	+34.3
Registered electors		11,303		
Liberal hold		Swing	+1.7	
Liberal hold		Swing	+2.0	

- Resignation of Peto

By-Election 30 April 1868: Bristol
Party	Candidate	Votes	%	±%
Conservative	John Miles	5,173	51.0	+22.1
Liberal	Samuel Morley	4,977	49.0	−22.1
Majority		196	2.0	N/A
Turnout		10,150	89.8	+5.5
Registered electors		11,303		
Conservative gain from Liberal		Swing	+22.1	

- McCalmont reports that Miles was unseated on petition, but that no new writ was issued before the 1868 general election. Craig also reports the election was voided.

General election 16 November 1868: Bristol (2 seats)
Party	Candidate	Votes	%	±%
Liberal	Henry FitzHardinge Berkeley	8,759	36.2	+0.4
Liberal	Samuel Morley	8,714	36.1	+0.8
Conservative	John Miles	6,694	27.7	−1.2
Majority		2,020	8.4	+1.9
Turnout		15,431 (est)	72.9 (est)	−11.4
Registered electors		21,153		
Liberal hold		Swing	+0.5	
Liberal hold		Swing	+0.7	

=== Elections in the 1870s ===
- Death of Berkeley

By-Election 29 March 1870: Bristol
Party	Candidate	Votes	%	±%
Liberal	Elisha Smith Robinson	7,882	52.7	−19.6
Conservative	Sholto Vere Hare	7,062	47.3	+19.6
Majority		820	5.4	−3.0
Turnout		14,944	70.6	−2.3
Registered electors		21,153		
Liberal hold		Swing	−19.6	

- Election of Robinson declared void on petition

By-Election 27 June 1870: Bristol
Party	Candidate	Votes	%	±%
Liberal	Kirkman Hodgson	7,816	51.9	−20.4
Conservative	Sholto Vere Hare	7,238	48.1	+20.4
Majority		578	3.8	−4.6
Turnout		15,054	71.2	−1.7
Registered electors		21,153		
Liberal hold		Swing	−20.4	

- Swing from Liberal to Conservative

General election 5 February 1874: Bristol (2 seats)
Party	Candidate	Votes	%	±%
Liberal	Kirkman Hodgson	8,888	26.3	−9.9
Liberal	Samuel Morley	8,732	25.8	−10.3
Conservative	Sholto Vere Hare	8,552	25.3	+11.4
Conservative	George Henry Chambers	7,626	22.6	+8.7
Majority		180	0.5	−7.9
Turnout		16,899 (est)	73.9 (est)	+1.0
Registered electors		22,867		
Liberal hold		Swing	−9.4	
Liberal hold		Swing	−9.5	

- Resignation of Hodgson

By-Election 16 December 1878: Bristol
Party	Candidate	Votes	%	±%
Liberal	Lewis Fry	9,342	54.5	+2.4
Conservative	Ivor Guest	7,795	45.5	−2.4
Majority		1,547	9.0	+8.5
Turnout		17,137	69.0	−4.9
Registered electors		24,851		
Liberal hold		Swing	+2.4	

=== Elections in the 1880s ===
General election April 1880: Bristol (2 seats)
Party	Candidate	Votes	%	±%
Liberal	Samuel Morley	10,704	31.2	+5.4
Liberal	Lewis Fry	10,070	29.4	+3.1
Conservative	Ivor Guest	9,395	27.4	+2.1
Liberal	Elisha Smith Robinson	4,100	12.0	N/A
Majority		675	2.0	+1.5
Turnout		17,135 (est)	73.8 (est)	−0.1
Registered electors		23,229		
Liberal hold		Swing	+2.2	
Liberal hold		Swing	+1.0	

- Constituency abolished - city split into four divisions (1885)

== See also ==
- List of former United Kingdom Parliament constituencies
- Unreformed House of Commons

== Bibliography ==
- Boundaries of Parliamentary Constituencies 1885-1972, compiled and edited by F.W.S. Craig (Parliamentary Reference Publications 1972)
- British Parliamentary Election Results 1832-1885, compiled and edited by F.W.S. Craig (The Macmillan Press 1977)
- McCalmont's Parliamentary Poll Book: British Election Results 1832-1918 (8th edition, The Harvester Press 1971)
- A. D.K. Hawkyard (1982). "Bristol". In Bindoff, S. T. (ed.). The House of Commons 1509–1558. The History of Parliament Trust.
- P. W. Hasler (1981). "Bristol". In Hasler, P. W. (ed.). The House of Commons 1558–1603. The History of Parliament Trust.
- Romney R. Sedgwick (1970). "Bristol". In Sedgwick, Romney (ed.). The House of Commons 1715–1754. The History of Parliament Trust.
- The Parliaments of England by Henry Stooks Smith (1st edition published in three volumes 1844-50), second edition edited (in one volume) by F.W.S. Craig (Political Reference Publications 1973) out of copyright
- Who's Who of British Members of Parliament: Volume I 1832-1885, edited by M. Stenton (The Harvester Press 1976)
