= William Daines =

English politician

Sir William Daines (1647 – 5 September 1724) was an English Whig politician who sat as MP for Bristol from January 1701 till 1710 and 1715 till 1722.

== Family ==
He was the son of William Daines and Phillis, the daughter of Thomas Bembrigg. He married Elizabeth, the daughter of Captain James Harris and had 1 son and 2 daughters. His father died in 1687. He was knighted on 28 November 1694.

== Biography ==
Born in colonial Virginia to English emigrants, became a successful merchant through the trans-Atlantic tobacco trade. After moving to Bristol in the late 1680s, he rose quickly in civic influence as a Whig, joining the common council in 1691, serving as sheriff in 1694 (when he was knighted), and becoming mayor by 1700. He helped secure legislation to improve Bristol’s infrastructure and entered Parliament as MP for Bristol in 1701, serving—despite frequent absences—until 1710, and again after 1715. Known as a consistent Whig, he voted with the party on major issues, including the naturalization of the Palatines and the impeachment of Dr. Henry Sacheverell. Daines transferred much of his Virginia land to family, retained wealth through trade, and died in Bristol in 1724, leaving substantial inheritances to his descendants.
