= Sir Henry Lippincott, 1st Baronet =

English politician

Sir Henry Lippincott, 1st Baronet (1737–1780), of Littleton-upon-Severn, Gloucestershire, was an English politician.

He was a member (MP) of the parliament of Great Britain for Bristol in 1780.

Baronetage of Great Britain
New creation	Baronet (of Stoke Bishop); 1778–1780	Succeeded by Henry Cann Lippincott
