= Edmund Blanket =

Member of the Parliament of England

Edmund Blanket was a member of parliament for the constituency of Bristol for the years 1362 and 1369. Edmund was a clothier and wool merchant and is locally accredited with the perhaps eponymously named blanket. Edmund died in 1371 and is buried in St Stephen's Church, Bristol, alongside his second wife Margaret.
