= Gilbert Pickering (14th century MP) =

English politician

Gilbert Pickering (fl. 1318) was an English politician.

He was a member (MP) of the parliament of England for Bristol in 1318.
