= Humphrey Hooke (died 1677) =

English politician and businessman

Sir Humphrey Hooke (6 August 1629 – 16 October 1677) was an English politician and businessman who served as Member of Parliament for Bristol.
