= John Canynges =

14th-century English politician

John Canynges (died 1405) was the member of the Parliament of England for Bristol for the parliament of October 1383 and of Marlborough for the parliament of September 1397.

He was also bailiff, sheriff, tax collector and mayor of Bristol at different times.
