= Thomas Beaupyne =

English politician (died 1404)

Thomas Beaupyne (died 1404) was an English politician. He sat as MP for Bristol in 1373, January 1377, 1378, May 1382, February 1388, Somerset in January 1390, and Bristol in 1393.

He also served as bailiff of Bristol from Michaelmas 1371 till 1372; Sheriff from 1 October 1374 till 1375; Mayor from Michaelmas 1377 till 1378, 1383 till 1384; and councillor in August 1381.

Before 1380, he married Margaret (died 26 July 1409) and they had one son whom predeceased him and four daughters.
