= Thomas Yonge =

English politician and judge

Thomas Yonge or Young (c. 1405–1476) was an English politician and judge.

He was the elder son of Thomas Yonge (d. 1426), who was Mayor of Bristol in 1411, and Member of Parliament for Bristol in 1413–14. His younger brother, Sir John Yonge, settled in London, representing the city in Parliament and becoming Sheriff in 1455 and Lord Mayor in 1466. Being, like his brother, a strong Yorkist, he was knighted by Edward IV after his restoration to the throne on 20 May 1471. Thomas Yonge received a legal education at the Middle Temple, and from 1439 onwards, his name frequently occurred in the year-books. Probably also he was the Thomas Yonge who was counsel for the city of Exeter in 1447.

On 26 September 1435 he was returned to Parliament for Bristol, being described as a "mercator" (merchant). He was re-elected for the same constituency on 17 December 1436, 8 January 1441–42, 31 January 1446–47, 27 January 1448–49, 28 October 1449, and 5 October 1450. Bristol was, like most of the trading centres, Yorkist in sympathies, and in June 1451, Yonge distinguished himself by presenting to Parliament a petition from his constituents to the effect that the Duke of York should be recognised as heir to the throne. This was part of the attack upon the Duke of Somerset, whose position was, however, unshaken; Parliament was dissolved, and Yonge was committed to the Tower. He was released in April 1452, on the general pardon issued after the temporary reconciliation of the two parties. On 7 July 1455 Yonge was once more elected for Bristol, and in January 1456 claimed redress for his arrest and imprisonment, reminding the Commons in his petition that all members "ought to have their freedom to speak and say in the house of their assembly as to them is thought convenient or reasonable without any manner of challenge, charge, or punition therefore to be laid to them in any wise". The Commons sent up the bill to the House of Lords, and the king ordered that the Lords of the council should provide a remedy, but no further proceedings in the matter are recorded.

Yonge was naturally not elected to the Lancastrian Parliament, which met at Coventry, a curious side-light on the division of parties being afforded by the fact that two "generosi de nativitate" took the place of the usual "mercatores" in the representation of Bristol. He was, however, returned for Gloucestershire on 15 September 1460 to the Parliament, which reversed the proceedings at Coventry. He probably also sat in the Parliaments of 1461 and 1462–63, the returns for which are lost, and the triumph of his party under Edward IV secured Yonge much administrative employment and legal promotion. On 7 November 1463, he was appointed serjeant-at-law and king's serjeant on the following day, and in November 1467, he was raised to the bench as Justice of the Common Pleas. However, he was not removed when Henry VI was restored in October 1470. He did lose his position during the puzzling rearrangement of the judiciary, when Edward IV regained his throne six months later, though he was exempted from the operation of the Act of Resumption in 1472–73. On 29 October 1475, in spite of his advanced age, he was appointed a justice of the King's Bench. He died in the following year and was buried in Christ Church, London. John Yonge (1467?–1516), the Master of the Rolls, is doubtfully said to have been his son, and Walter Yonge the diarist, to have been descended from him.
