= Matthew Brickdale =

English merchant, politician, philanthropist and slave trader (1636–1721)

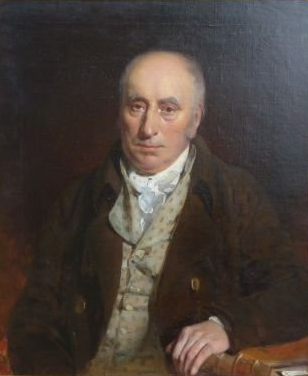
- Portrait by Henry Singleton

Member of Parliament for Bristol
- In office 1768–1774
- Preceded by: Jarrit Smyth
- Succeeded by: Edmund Burke

Member of Parliament for Bristol
- In office 1780–1790
- Preceded by: Henry Cruger
- Succeeded by: Henry Somerset, 6th Duke of Beaufort

Personal details
- Born: Matthew Brickdale of Clifton and Taunton; 30 April 1735 Bristol, England
- Died: 8 September 1831 (aged 96) Bristol, England
- Party: Tory
- Occupation: politician

Matthew Brickdale (30 April 1735 – 8 September 1831) was an English politician who was a Member of Parliament for Bristol from 1768 to 1774 and from 1780 to 1790.
