= 1681 English general election =

General election in England

- 1681

All 513 seats in the House of Commons 257 seats needed for a majority
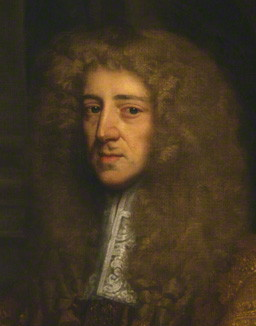
	First party	Second party
		Tor
Leader	Anthony Ashley Cooper
Party	Whig	Tory
Seats won	309	193
Seat change	▼1	▼27
- Composition of the House of Commons after the election

The 1681 English general election returned members to the last parliament of Charles II. Dubbed the Oxford Parliament, the body elected sat for one week from 21 March 1681 until 28 March 1681. Party strengths are an approximation, with many MPs' allegiances being unknown.
