= Philip John Miles =

English landowner, slave owner, merchant, shipowner, banker and politician

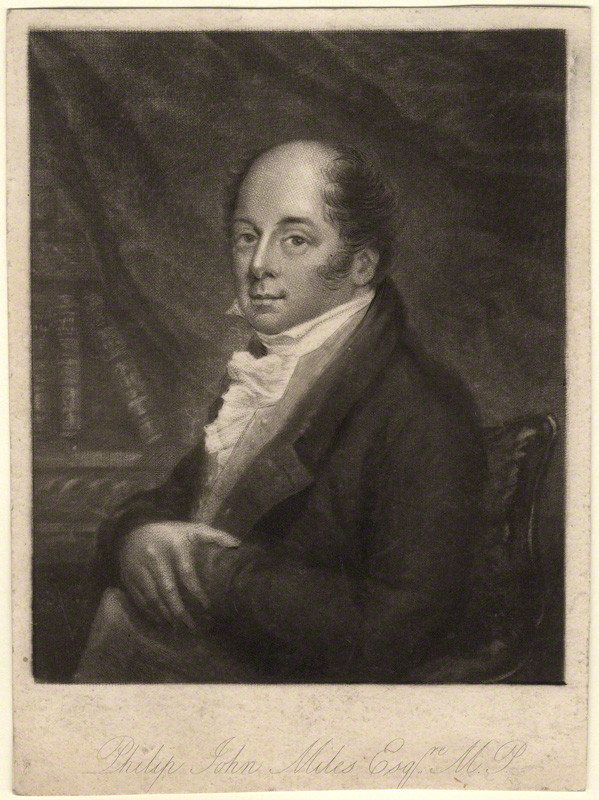
Philip John Miles, 1822 engraving

Philip John Miles (1773–1845) was an English landowner, slave owner, merchant, shipowner, banker and politician from Bristol. Through his banking interests he found himself on the register of owners of slaves on plantations in Jamaica though only as mortgagee in possession in cases when his bank had taken possession of plantations through the default of their owners on mortgage payments. He left an estate of over £1.2 million (the equivalent of £1.75 billion in 2023 using relative income by GDP per capita), making him the first recorded millionaire of Bristol.

== Life ==
He was born on 1 March 1773, the second but only surviving son of William Miles (1728–1803), a Bristol West India merchant, and his wife Sarah Berrow. His elder brother William died aged 23 in 1790, and he inherited from his financier father in 1803.

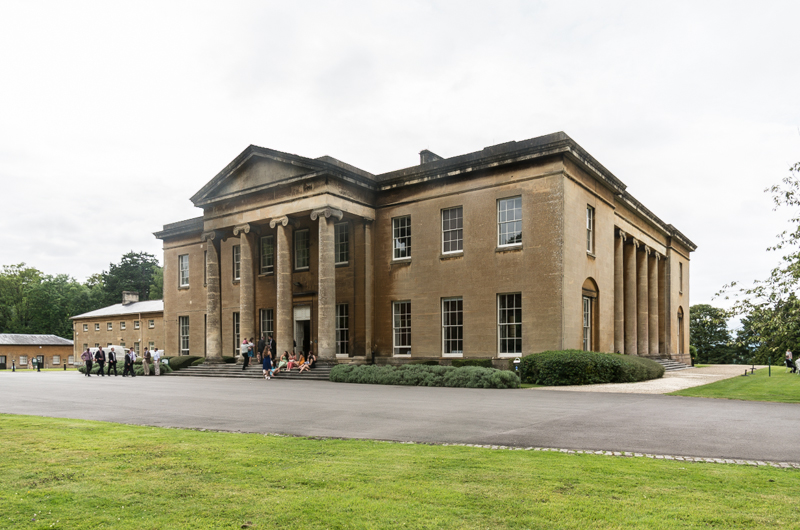
Leigh Court today

Miles was a partner in Miles Bank of Bristol, and later Miles, Harford & Co, which eventually became part of NatWest. He had Leigh Court at Abbots Leigh rebuilt, 1814–8. Miles also owned properties and extensive estates elsewhere including Kings Weston House (by Sir John Vanbrugh), The Manor House (Old Rectory) at Walton-in-Gordano, Walton Castle, Cardigan Priory and Underdown by Anthony Keck in Ledbury, Herefordshire, where the family originated before moving to Somerset.

He sat three times as a Member of Parliament, for Westbury from 1820, for Corfe Castle from 1829, and for Bristol from 1835. Under the Slave Compensation Act 1837 he received money from properties in Jamaica and Trinidad in compensation for the release of more than 2000 slaves. He was a member of White's, Arthur's, the Carlton, the Union Club and was a founder member of the Athenaeum.

Miles died on 24 March 1845. His lifelong friend John Benett wrote in his private diary

"Philip John Miles of Leigh Court near Bristol died from the effects of influenza in his 72nd year. He was one of my oldest and most valued friends - he was a sensible and pruent man; highly honest in all his mercantile and other dealings with the world - a kind husband, father and master to his servants, and in money matters I would say liberal. He was a steady and sincere friend and as such I lament the loss of him. He died surrounded by 13 children and his wife."

The Bristol Mercury wrote

"His manners and deportment were plain and unassuming, free alike from affectation and coarseness, they bore the English stamp of honest and hearty sincerity. His disposition corresponded with his appearance. He gave away much in charity, but he gave it without the slightest ostentation."

== Family ==
Miles married:

1. In 1795, Maria Whetham (1776–1811), daughter of John Whetham; and
2. In 1813 Clarissa Peach (1790–1868), daughter of Samuel Peach Peach.

From the first marriage there were one son and four daughters:

- Sir William Miles, 1st Baronet,
- Sarah Agatha Miles (1799–1830)
- Maria Miles (1804–1822)
- Elizabeth Miles (1806–1853)
- Milicent Miles (1808–1867).

From the second marriage, there were seven sons and four daughters:

- Philip William Skinner Miles (1816–1881), father of Philip Napier Miles;
- John William Miles (1817–1878), died unmarried, lived with brother Henry Cruger Miles and sister Clarissa Philippa Miles at Penpole House
- Robert Henry William Miles (1818–1883), father of Frank Miles, and Robert Miles
- George Frederick William Miles (1820–1886)
- Ellen Octavia Miles (b. 1821)
- Charles William Miles (1823–1892)
- Sybilla Mary Miles (1827–1889),
- Edward Peach William Miles (born 1829 at Abbots Leigh – died 1889 at Raglan, New Zealand), married Olivia Caroline Cave (1831–1870) and had three children; great-grandfather of Peter Miles (courtier).
- Henry Cruger William Miles (1832–1888), died unmarried, lived with his brother John William Miles and sister Clarissa Philippa Miles at Penpole House. High Sheriff of Bristol in 1866.
- Marianne Adelaide Miles (b. 1834) who married General Patrick MacDougall, Commander of the British Troops in Canada
- Clarissa Philippa Miles (1838-1892) died unmarried, lived with brothers Henry Cruger Miles and John William Miles at Penpole House.
