= Ambrose Cuddon =

English anarchist (1790–1879)

- Born: 1790
- Died: 1879 (aged 88–89)
- Known for: First person in England to describe oneself as an anarchist
- Movement: Anarchism; Chartism; Owenism; Radicalism

Ambrose Cuddon (1790–1879) was an English anarchist, among the first in the country. Cuddon was a Chartist and influenced by Robert Owen, combining the views of the Owenites with those of William Godwin. He published Cosmopolitan Review, the first English anarchist periodical.

== Biography ==
Ambrose Cuddon was born in 1790 in Bungay, Suffolk, England.

== Works ==
=== Books ===
- The exposer exposed, in an answer to the author of a book, called "A complete exposure of the late Irish miracles / by a Catholic Englishman : To which is added, A reply to the Edinburgh reviewers on the same subject : Concluding with a letter from the Rev. Prince Hohenlohe (1824)

=== Books (edited) ===
- The Inherent Evils of All State Governments Demonstrated (1858) – A Vindication of Natural Society by Edmund Burke; edited with an appendix by Cuddon.

=== Pamphlets ===
- Programme of the Rational Reformers (1853)
