= On American Taxation =

1774 speech by Edmund Burke

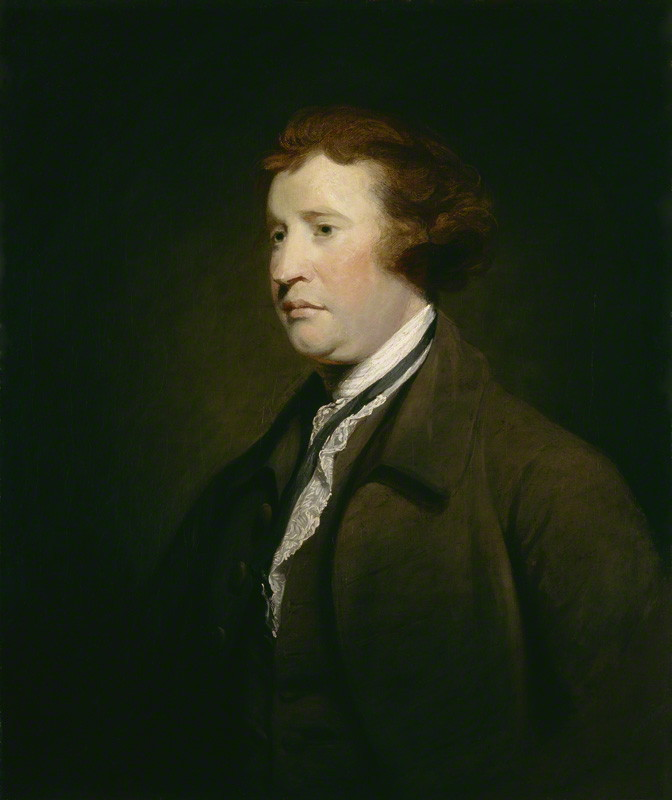
Burke in a 1771 portrait by Joshua Reynolds

"On American Taxation" was a speech given by Edmund Burke in the British House of Commons on April 19, 1774, advocating the full repeal of the Townshend Revenue Act of 1767. Parliament had previously repealed five of the six duties of this revenue tax on the American colonies, but the tax on tea remained. The speech was given during the debates on the Coercive Acts, when Rose Fuller proposed that the Townshend duty on tea be repealed to decrease resistance to the new acts. Burke's speech was in support of this motion. According to historian Robert Middlekauff, "The speech is memorable for its wit and its brilliant reconstruction of the government's dismal efforts to bring order into colonial affairs without the advantage of a coherent policy."

== Context ==
Edmund Burke was a British member of Parliament who by the 1770s had become an important part of the opposition. The Stamp Act was passed the same year he was first elected to Parliament, and this and ensuing revenue acts had generated significant resistance among American colonists. In general terms, Burke argued throughout these years that the resistance was a consequence of the inflexibility of British policy towards its colonies. His arguments were the ideas of an eminently practical man. Burke was more concerned with the actual functioning of government than with theory or history.

By the spring of 1774, Burke had come to believe that affairs between Britain and the colonies were reaching an important moment. He did not believe that a break was imminent, but knew the situation was serious. When a debate was held in Parliament related to a motion to repeal the Tea Act, he took the opportunity to speak. He intended to give a general warning about British policy, but not necessarily to propose many specific remedies.

== Argument ==
Burke's core arguments in the speech centered around the powers of Parliament and its right to tax the colonies. The speech began with a discussion of the history of British colonialism going back to the Navigation Acts. He argued that these acts had not significantly infringed upon the rights of the colonists to tax themselves, since the majority of this authority was still retained in the colonial assemblies. Further, they were acts that taxed commerce rather than direct taxes created solely for the purpose of raising revenue. With the implementation of the Stamp Act and ensuing revenue acts in the 1760s, this situation had changed. He therefore proposed an underlying theory for a new policy towards taxation of colonies that might resolve the impasse.

Burke argued that Parliament did have the right to tax the colonies, but only as a last resort when it was necessary to preserve the empire, what he called a reserve power. Such dire circumstances required that Parliament be as flexible as possible in its ability to respond, and that taxation was one of the areas where this flexibility should be available although rarely used. In any circumstances other than emergencies, however, he argued taxation should be a right practiced in effect by the legislatures, such as those who helped govern the Thirteen Colonies. These suggestions would be adopted as policy by the British Empire many years later, but were not implemented at the time.

Historians have compared this argument to the concept of federalism that would later be implemented in the United States Constitution. But Burke's most fundamental point as expressed in both his opening and closing was the practical idea that the British government should do whatever it took to restore relations with the American colonies. Disagreements over legal issues, he argued, should not be allowed to damage the empire.

== Critical and historical response ==
The speech had little immediate effect. As the situation in America worsened, Burke continued to think and speak about the relationship of Britain with her colonies. These culminated in a speech known as On Conciliation with America. These latter attempts also failed to prevent armed conflict.

With Conciliation with America, On American Taxation makes up one of Burke's two most important statements on British policy towards America. Historians have recognized On American Taxation as the more typical of Burke's oratory, being extemporaneous, more energetic, and wittier. Its argument is therefore less carefully constructed but more passionate. It is also more hopeful, having been delivered a year before Conciliation in America, when Burke apparently still believed that there was a chance to alter British policy towards the colonies.

== Notable quotations ==
Could anything be a subject of more just alarm to America, than to see you go out of the plain high road of finance, and give up your most certain revenues and your clearest interests, merely for the sake of insulting your Colonies? No man ever doubted that the commodity of Tea could bear an imposition of three-pence. But no commodity will bear three-pence, or will bear a penny, when the general feelings of men are irritated, and two millions of people are resolved not to pay. The feelings of the Colonies were formerly the feelings of Great Britain. Theirs were formerly the feelings of Mr. Hampden when called upon for the payment of twenty shillings. Would twenty shillings have ruined Mr. Hampden's fortune? No! but the payment of half twenty shillings, on the principle it was demanded, would have made him a slave. It is the weight of that preamble, of which you are so fond, and not the weight of the duty, that the Americans are unable and unwilling to bear.

Whether you were right or wrong in establishing the Colonies on the principles of commercial monopoly, rather than on that of revenue, is at this day a problem of mere speculation. You cannot have both by the same authority. To join together the restraints of a universal internal and external monopoly, with a universal internal and external taxation, is an unnatural union; perfect uncompensated slavery.

Again, and again, revert to your own principles—Seek Peace, and ensue it—leave America, if she has taxable matter in her, to tax herself.
