= Thoughts on the Cause of the Present Discontents =

Pamphlet by Edmund Burke

Thoughts on the Cause of the Present Discontents is a political pamphlet by the Irish politician and philosopher Edmund Burke, first published on 23 April 1770. The subject is the nepotism of King George III and the influence of the Court on the House of Commons of Great Britain. The essay was influential in defining political parties and their roles within government. In it, Burke argued that parties are "bod[ies] of men united for promoting by their joint endeavours the national interest upon some particular principle in which they are all agreed. . . . When bad men combine, the good must associate."
