= Edmund Burke =

Anglo-Irish politician and philosopher (1729–1797)

The Right Honourable Edmund Burke
- Portrait by Sir Joshua Reynolds, c. 1774

Paymaster of the Forces
- In office 16 April 1783 – 8 January 1784
- Prime Minister: The Duke of Portland; William Pitt the Younger
- Preceded by: Isaac Barré
- Succeeded by: William Grenville
- In office 10 April 1782 – 1 August 1782
- Prime Minister: The Marquess of Rockingham
- Preceded by: Richard Rigby
- Succeeded by: Isaac Barré

Rector of the University of Glasgow
- In office 1783–1785
- Preceded by: Henry Dundas
- Succeeded by: Robert Bontine

Member of Parliament
- In office December 1765 – 20 June 1794
- Preceded by: Verney Lovett
- Succeeded by: Richard Burke Jr.
- Constituency: Wendover (1765–1774); Bristol (1774–1780); Malton (1780–1794)

Personal details
- Born: 1 January 1729 Dublin, Kingdom of Ireland
- Died: 9 July 1797 (aged 68) Beaconsfield, Kingdom of Great Britain
- Party: Whig (Rockinghamite)
- Spouse: Jane Mary Nugent (m. 1757)
- Children: Richard Burke Jr.
- Education: Ballitore Quaker School; Trinity College Dublin (B.A., 1748); Middle Temple
- Profession: Writer; politician; journalist; philosopher

Philosophical work
- Era: Age of Enlightenment
- Region: Western philosophy: British philosophy
- School: Classical liberalism Conservatism; Counter-Enlightenment; Romanticism; Conservative liberalism Liberal conservatism
- Institutions: Literary Club (co-founder)
- Main interests: Politics; Society; Aesthetics
- Notable works: A Vindication of Natural Society (1756); On the Sublime and Beautiful (1757); On American Taxation (1774); Reflections on the Revolution in France (1790); An Appeal from the New to the Old Whigs (1791)
- Notable ideas: Aesthetic sublime; Literary sublime; Traditionalist conservatism; Intergenerationality; Religious thought

Signature
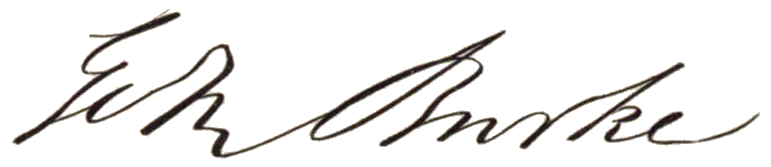

Edmund Burke (/bɜːrk/; 12 January [NS] 1729 – 9 July 1797) was an Anglo-Irish writer, philosopher, and politician who is widely credited as the founder of the cultural and political philosophy of conservatism. Regarded as one of the most influential conservative thinkers and political writers of the 18th century, Burke spent the majority of his career in Great Britain and was elected as a member of Parliament (MP) from 1766 to 1794 in the House of Commons of Great Britain with the Whig Party. His writings played a significant role in influencing public views and opinions in both Great Britain and France following the French Revolution in 1789, and he remains a major figure in modern conservative circles.

Burke was a proponent of underpinning virtues with manners in society and of the importance of religious institutions for the moral stability and good of the state. These views were expressed in his satirical work, A Vindication of Natural Society (1756). He also criticised the actions of the British government towards the American colonies, including its taxation policies. Burke supported the rights of the colonists to resist metropolitan authority, although he opposed the attempt to achieve independence. He is particularly remembered for his long-term support for Catholic emancipation, his opposition to the French Revolution, and leading the attempt at impeachment of Warren Hastings from the East India Company. In 1774, Burke was elected a member of Parliament for Bristol.

In his Reflections on the Revolution in France (1790), Burke asserted that the revolution was destroying the fabric of good society and traditional institutions of state and society, and he condemned the persecution of the Catholic Church that resulted from it. This led to him becoming a popular leading figure within the conservative faction of the Whig Party, which he dubbed the Old Whigs as opposed to the pro-French Revolution New Whigs led by Charles James Fox. Burke had a close relation with some of the public intellectuals of his time, including Samuel Johnson, David Garrick, Oliver Goldsmith, and Joshua Reynolds. In his debates, he often argued against unrestricted ruling power and the importance of political parties having the ability to maintain a principled opposition that was capable of preventing abuse of power.

In the 19th century, Burke was praised by both conservatives and liberals. Subsequently, in the 20th century, he became widely regarded, especially in the United States and the United Kingdom, as the philosophical founder of conservatism, along with his French ultra-royalist and ultramontanist counterpart Joseph de Maistre. His writings and literary publications influenced British conservative thought to a great extent, and helped establish the earliest foundations for modern conservatism and liberal democracy.

== Early life ==
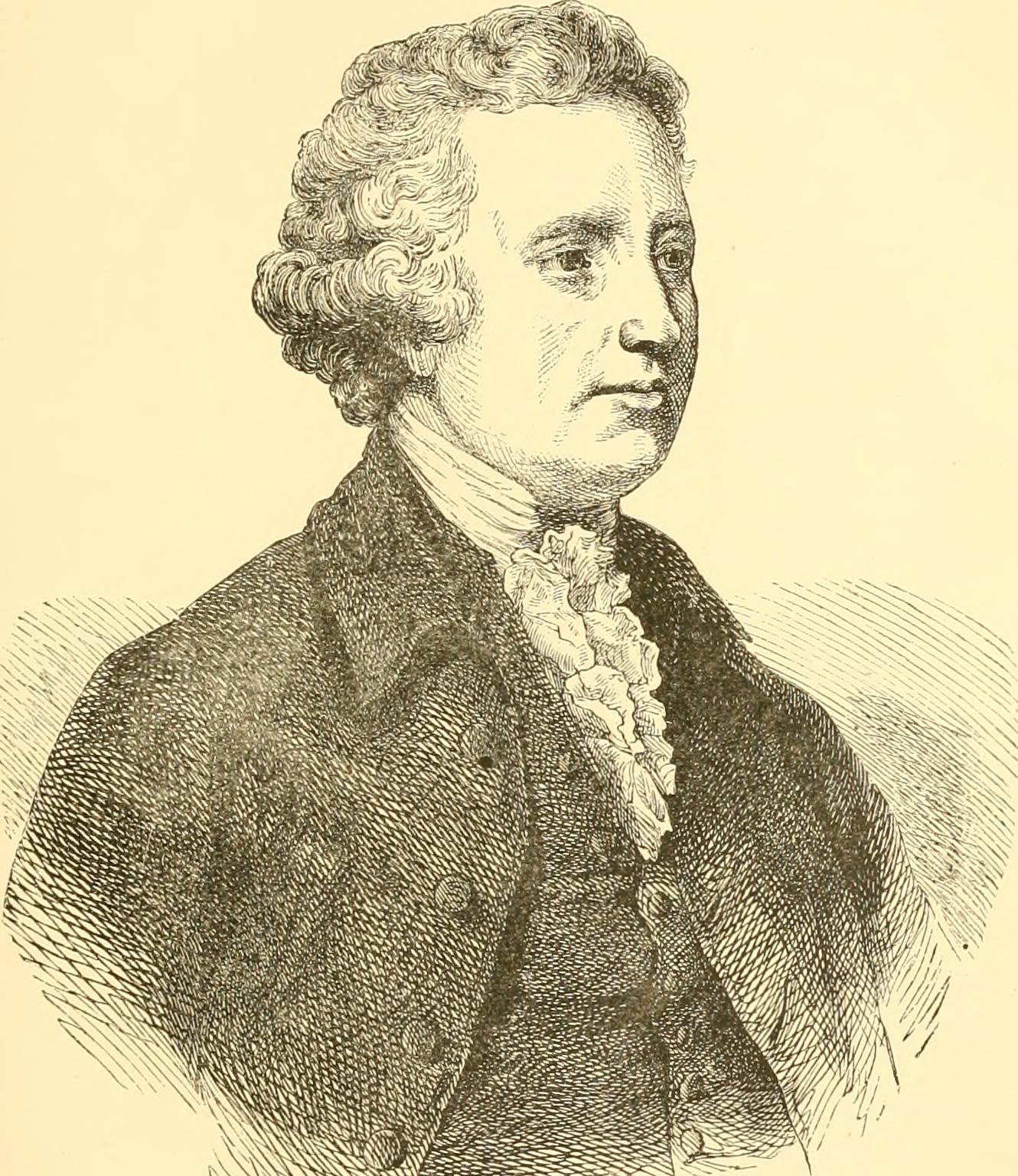
1882 illustration of Burke

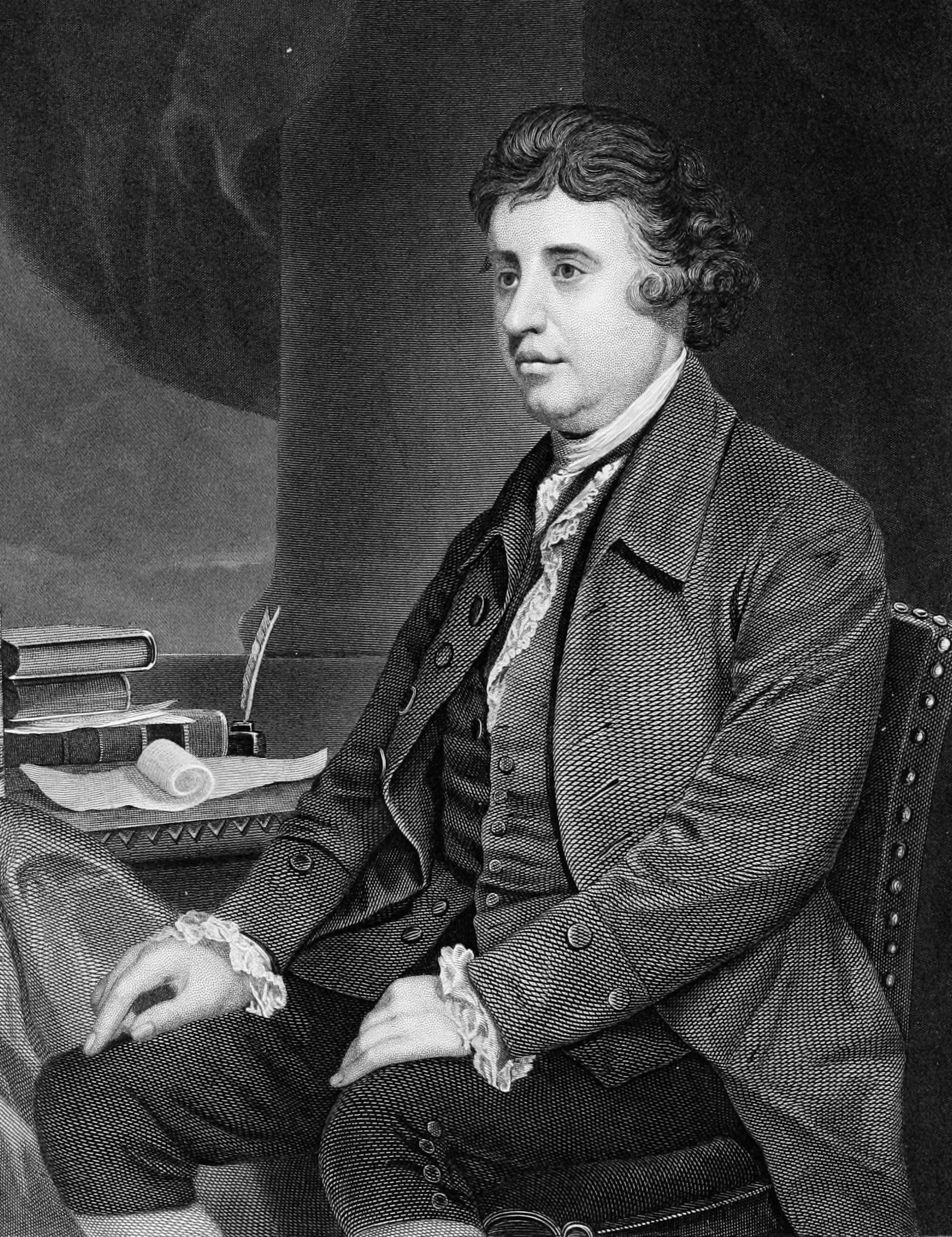
Edmund Burke

Burke was born in Dublin, Ireland. His mother Mary, née Nagle, was a Roman Catholic who hailed from a County Cork family and a cousin of the Catholic educator Nano Nagle, whereas his father Richard, a successful solicitor, was a member of the Church of Ireland. It remains unclear whether this is the same Richard Burke who converted from Catholicism. The Burgh (Burke) dynasty descends from the Anglo-Norman knight William de Burgh, who arrived in Ireland in 1185 following Henry II's 1171 invasion of Ireland and is among the "chief Gall or Old English families that assimilated into Gaelic society" (the surname de Burgh (latinised as de Burgo) was gaelicised in Irish as de Búrca or Búrc, which over the centuries became Burke).

Burke adhered to his father's faith and remained a practising Anglican throughout his life, unlike his sister Juliana, who was brought up as and remained a Roman Catholic. Later, his political enemies repeatedly accused him of having been educated at the Jesuit College of St Omer, near Calais, France; and of harbouring secret Catholic sympathies at a time when membership in the Catholic Church would disqualify him from public office per Penal Laws in Ireland. As Burke told Frances Crewe:

Mr. Burke's Enemies often endeavoured to convince the World that he had been bred up in the Catholic Faith, & that his Family were of it, & that he himself had been educated at Saint-Omer—but this was false, as his father was a regular practitioner of the Law at Dublin, which he could not be unless of the Established Church: & it so happened that though Mr. B was twice at Paris, he never happened to go through the Town of Saint-Omer.

After being elected to the House of Commons, Burke took the required oath of allegiance and abjuration, the oath of supremacy and the declaration against transubstantiation.

As a child, Burke sometimes spent time away from the unhealthy air of Dublin with his mother's family near Killavullen in the Blackwater Valley in County Cork. He received his early education at a Quaker school in Ballitore, County Kildare, some 67 kilometres (42 mi) from Dublin; and possibly like his cousin Nano Nagle at a hedge school near Killavullen. He remained in correspondence with his schoolmate from there, Mary Leadbeater, the daughter of the school's owner, throughout his life.

In 1744, Burke started at Trinity College Dublin, a Protestant establishment which up until 1793 did not permit Catholics to take degrees. In 1747, he set up a debating society, Edmund Burke's Club, which in 1770 merged with Trinity's Historical Club to form the College Historical Society, the oldest undergraduate society in the world. The minutes of the meetings of Burke's Club remain in the collection of the Historical Society. Burke graduated from Trinity in 1748. Burke's father wanted him to read Law and with this in mind, he went to London in 1750, where he entered the Middle Temple, before soon giving up legal study to travel in Continental Europe. After eschewing the Law, he pursued a livelihood through writing.

== Early writing ==
The late Lord Bolingbroke's Letters on the Study and Use of History was published in 1752 and his collected works appeared in 1754. This provoked Burke into writing his first published work, A Vindication of Natural Society: A View of the Miseries and Evils Arising to Mankind, appearing in Spring 1756. Burke imitated Bolingbroke's style and ideas in a reductio ad absurdum of his arguments for deistic rationalism in order to demonstrate their absurdity.

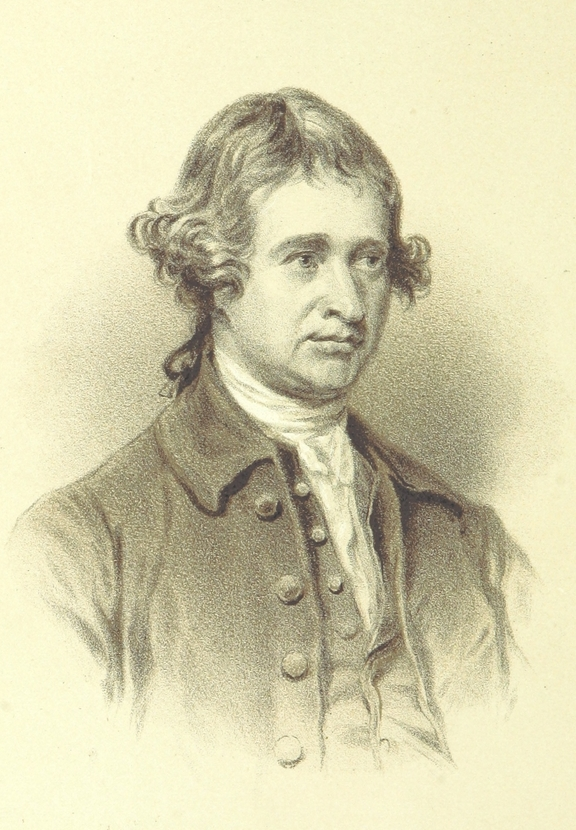
In A Vindication of Natural Society, Burke argued: "The writers against religion, whilst they oppose every system, are wisely careful never to set up any of their own."

Burke stated that Bolingbroke's arguments against revealed religion could apply to all social and civil institutions as well. Lord Chesterfield and Bishop Warburton as well as others initially thought that the work was genuinely by Bolingbroke rather than a satire. All the reviews of the work were positive, with critics especially appreciative of Burke's quality of writing. Some reviewers failed to notice the ironic nature of the book which led to Burke stating in the preface to the second edition (1757) that it was a satire.

Richard Hurd believed that Burke's imitation was near-perfect and that this defeated his purpose, arguing that an ironist "should take care by a constant exaggeration to make the ridicule shine through the Imitation. Whereas this Vindication is everywhere enforc'd, not only in the language, and on the principles of L. Bol., but with so apparent, or rather so real an earnestness, that half his purpose is sacrificed to the other". A minority of scholars have taken the position that in fact Burke did write the Vindication in earnest, later disowning it only for political reasons.

In 1757, Burke published a treatise on aesthetics titled A Philosophical Enquiry into the Origin of Our Ideas of the Sublime and Beautiful that attracted the attention of prominent Continental thinkers such as Denis Diderot and Immanuel Kant. It was his only purely philosophical work, completed in 1753. When asked by Sir Joshua Reynolds and French Laurence to expand it thirty years later, Burke replied that he was no longer fit for abstract speculation.

On 25 February 1757, Burke signed a contract with Robert Dodsley to write a "history of England from the time of Julius Caesar to the end of the reign of Queen Anne", its length being eighty quarto sheets (640 pages), nearly 400,000 words. It was to be submitted for publication by Christmas 1758. Burke completed the work to the year 1216 and stopped; it was not published until after Burke's death, in an 1812 collection of his works, An Essay Towards an Abridgement of the English History. G. M. Young did not value Burke's history and claimed that it was "demonstrably a translation from the French". On commenting on the story that Burke stopped his history because David Hume published his, Lord Acton said "it is ever to be regretted that the reverse did not occur".

During the year following that contract, Burke founded with Dodsley the influential Annual Register, a publication in which various authors evaluated the international political events of the previous year. The extent to which Burke contributed to the Annual Register is unclear. In his biography of Burke, Robert Murray quotes the Register as evidence of Burke's opinions, yet Philip Magnus in his biography does not cite it directly as a reference. Burke remained the chief editor of the publication until at least 1789 and there is no evidence that any other writer contributed to it before 1766.

On 12 March 1757, Burke married Jane Mary Nugent (1734–1812), daughter of Dr. Christopher Nugent, a Catholic physician who had provided him with medical treatment at Bath. Their son Richard was born on 9 February 1758 while a second son, Christopher (born that December), died in infancy. Burke also helped raise a ward, Edmund Nagle (later Admiral Sir Edmund Nagle), the son of a maternal cousin orphaned in 1763.

At about this same time, Burke was introduced to William Gerard Hamilton (known as "Single-speech Hamilton"). When Hamilton was appointed Chief Secretary for Ireland, Burke accompanied him to Dublin as his private secretary, a position he held for three years. In 1765, Burke became private secretary to the liberal Whig politician Charles, Marquess of Rockingham, then Prime Minister of Great Britain, who remained Burke's close friend and associate until his death in 1782.

== Member of Parliament ==
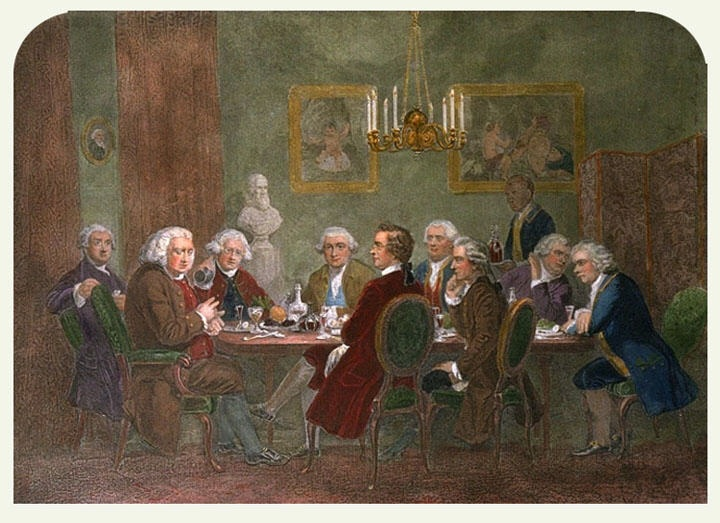
A literary party at Sir Joshua Reynolds's. Left to right: James Boswell, Samuel Johnson, Joshua Reynolds, David Garrick, Edmund Burke, Pasquale Paoli, Charles Burney, a servant (possibly Francis Barber), Thomas Warton, Oliver Goldsmith. (select a detail of the image for more information)

In December 1765, Burke entered the House of Commons of the British Parliament as Member for Wendover in Buckinghamshire, a pocket borough in the gift of Lord Fermanagh, later 2nd Earl Verney and a close political ally of Rockingham. After Burke delivered his maiden speech, William Pitt the Elder said he had "spoken in such a manner as to stop the mouths of all Europe" and that the Commons should congratulate itself on acquiring such a Member.

The first great subject Burke addressed was the controversy with the American colonies which soon developed into war and ultimate separation. In reply to the 1769 Grenvillite pamphlet The Present State of the Nation, he published his own pamphlet titled Observations on a Late State of the Nation. Surveying the finances of France, Burke predicts "some extraordinary convulsion in that whole system".

During the same year, with mostly borrowed money, Burke purchased Gregories, a 600-acre (2.4 km^{2}) estate near Beaconsfield. Although the estate included saleable assets such as art works by Titian, Gregories proved a heavy financial burden in the following decades and Burke was never able to repay its purchase price in full. His speeches and writings, having made him famous, led to the suggestion that he was the author of the Letters of Junius.

At about this time, Burke joined the circle of leading intellectuals and artists in London of whom Samuel Johnson was the central luminary. This circle also included David Garrick, Oliver Goldsmith and Joshua Reynolds. Edward Gibbon described Burke as "the most eloquent and rational madman that I ever knew". Although Johnson admired Burke's brilliance, he found him a dishonest politician.

Burke took a leading role in the debate regarding the constitutional limits to the executive authority of the king. He argued strongly against unrestrained royal power and for the role of political parties in maintaining a principled opposition capable of preventing abuses, either by the monarch or by specific factions within the government. His most important publication in this regard was his Thoughts on the Cause of the Present Discontents of 23 April 1770. Burke identified the "discontents" as stemming from the "secret influence" of a neo-Tory group he labelled as the "king's friends", whose system "comprehending the exterior and interior administrations, is commonly called, in the technical language of the Court, Double Cabinet". Britain needed a party with "an unshaken adherence to principle, and attachment to connexion, against every allurement of interest". Party divisions, "whether operating for good or evil, are things inseparable from free government".

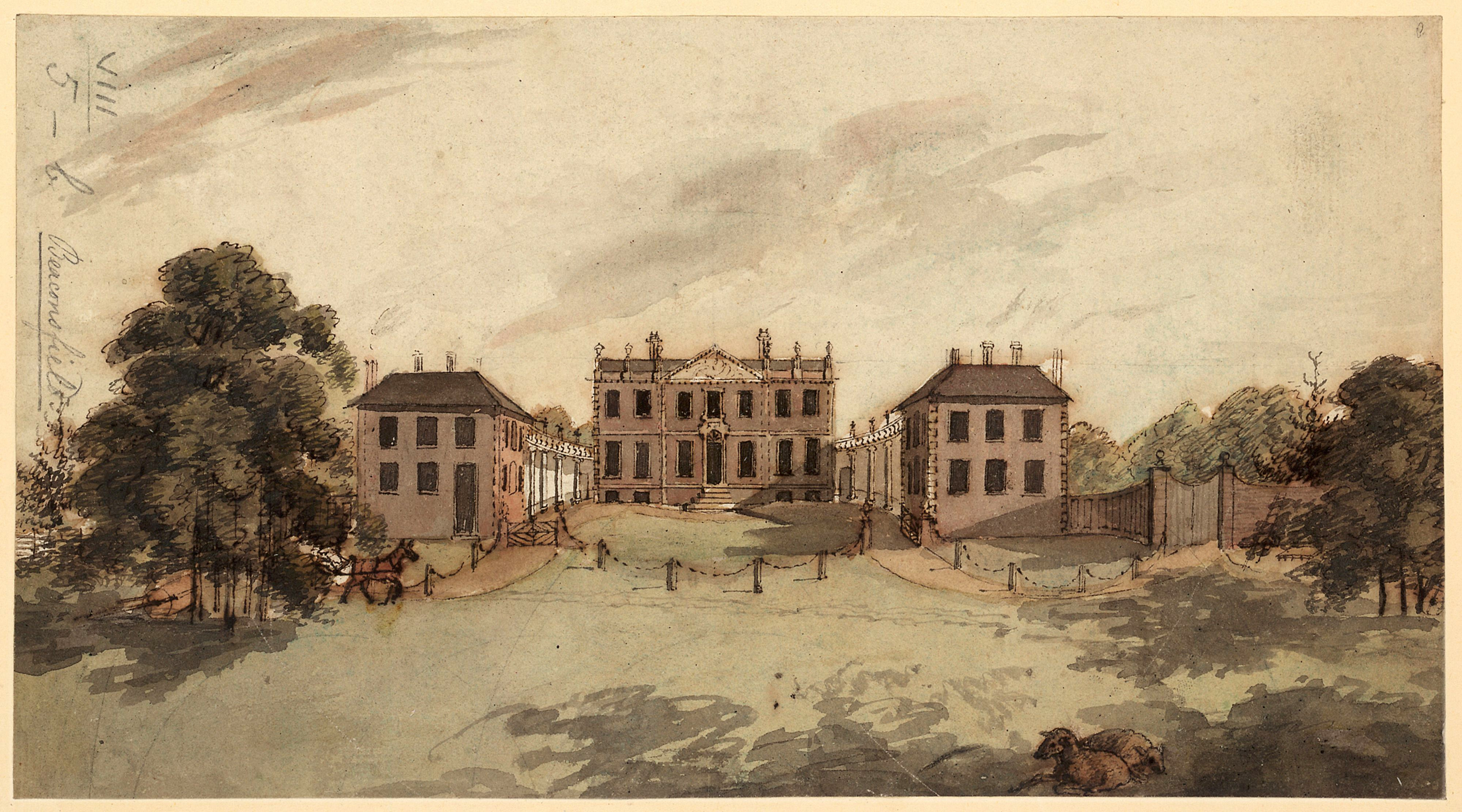
The Gregories estate purchased by Burke for £20,000 in 1768

During 1771, Burke wrote a bill that would have given juries the right to determine what was libel, if passed. Burke spoke in favour of the bill, but it was opposed by some, including Charles James Fox, not becoming law. When introducing his own bill in 1791 in opposition, Fox repeated almost verbatim the text of Burke's bill without acknowledgement. Burke was prominent in securing the right to publish debates held in Parliament.

Speaking in a Parliamentary debate on the prohibition on the export of grain on 16 November 1770, Burke argued in favour of a free market in corn: "There are no such things as a high, & a low price that is encouraging, & discouraging; there is nothing but a natural price, which grain brings at an universal market". In 1772, Burke was instrumental in the passing of the Repeal of Certain Laws Act 1772 which repealed various old laws against dealers and forestallers in corn.

In the Annual Register for 1772 (published in July 1773), Burke condemned the partition of Poland. He saw it as "the first very great breach in the modern political system of Europe" and as upsetting the balance of power in Europe.

On 3 November 1774, Burke was elected Member for Bristol, at the time "England's second city" with a large constituency in a genuine electoral contest. At the conclusion of the poll, he made his Speech to the Electors of Bristol at the Conclusion of the Poll, a remarkable disclaimer of the constituent-imperative form of democracy, for which he substituted his statement of the "representative mandate" form. He failed to win re-election for that seat in the subsequent 1780 general election.

In May 1778, Burke supported a Parliamentary motion revising restrictions on Irish trade. His constituents, citizens of the great trading city of Bristol, urged Burke to oppose free trade with Ireland. Burke resisted their protestations and said: "If, from this conduct, I shall forfeit their suffrages at an ensuing election, it will stand on record an example to future representatives of the Commons of England, that one man at least had dared to resist the desires of his constituents when his judgment assured him they were wrong."

Burke published Two Letters to Gentlemen of Bristol on the Bills relative to the Trade of Ireland in which he espoused "some of the chief principles of commerce; such as the advantage of free intercourse between all parts of the same kingdom ... the evils attending restriction and monopoly ... and that the gain of others is not necessarily our loss, but on the contrary an advantage by causing a greater demand for such wares as we have for sale."

Burke also supported the attempts of Sir George Savile to repeal some of the penal laws against Catholics. Burke also called capital punishment "the Butchery which we call justice" in 1776 and in 1780 condemned the use of the pillory for two men convicted for attempting to practice sodomy.

This support for unpopular causes, notably free trade with Ireland and Catholic emancipation, led to Burke losing his seat in 1780. For the remainder of his Parliamentary career, Burke represented Malton, another pocket borough under the Marquess of Rockingham's patronage.

== American War of Independence ==
Burke expressed his support for the grievances of the American Thirteen Colonies under the government of King George III and his appointed representatives. On 19 April 1774, Burke made a speech, "On American Taxation" (published in January 1775), on a motion to repeal the tea duty:

Again and again, revert to your old principles—seek peace and ensue it; leave America, if she has taxable matter in her, to tax herself. I am not here going into the distinctions of rights, nor attempting to mark their boundaries. I do not enter into these metaphysical distinctions; I hate the very sound of them. Leave the Americans as they anciently stood, and these distinctions, born of our unhappy contest, will die along with it ... Be content to bind America by laws of trade; you have always done it ... Do not burthen them with taxes ... But if intemperately, unwisely, fatally, you sophisticate and poison the very source of government by urging subtle deductions, and consequences odious to those you govern, from the unlimited and illimitable nature of supreme sovereignty, you will teach them by these means to call that sovereignty itself in question ... If that sovereignty and their freedom cannot be reconciled, which will they take? They will cast your sovereignty in your face. No body of men will be argued into slavery.

On 22 March 1775, Burke delivered in the House of Commons a speech (published in May 1775) on reconciliation with America. Burke appealed for peace as preferable to civil war and reminded the House of Commons of America's growing population, its industry and its wealth. He warned against the notion that the Americans would back down in the face of force since most Americans were of British descent:

[T]he people of the colonies are descendants of Englishmen ... They are therefore not only devoted to liberty, but to liberty according to English ideas and on English principles. The people are Protestants ... a persuasion not only favourable to liberty, but built upon it ... My hold of the colonies is in the close affection which grows from common names, from kindred blood, from similar privileges, and equal protection. These are ties which, though light as air, are as strong as links of iron. Let the colonies always keep the idea of their civil rights associated with your government—they will cling and grapple to you, and no force under heaven will be of power to tear them from their allegiance. But let it be once understood that your government may be one thing and their privileges another, that these two things may exist without any mutual relation—the cement is gone, the cohesion is loosened, and everything hastens to decay and dissolution. As long as you have the wisdom to keep the sovereign authority of this country as the sanctuary of liberty, the sacred temple consecrated to our common faith, wherever the chosen race and sons of England worship freedom, they will turn their faces towards you. The more they multiply, the more friends you will have; the more ardently they love liberty, the more perfect will be their obedience. Slavery they can have anywhere. It is a weed that grows in every soil. They may have it from Spain, they may have it from Prussia. But, until you become lost to all feeling of your true interest and your natural dignity, freedom they can have from none but you.

Burke prized peace with America above all else, pleading with the House of Commons to remember that the interest by way of money received from the American colonies was far more attractive than any sense of putting the colonists in their place:

The proposition is peace. Not peace through the medium of war, not peace to be hunted through the labyrinth of intricate and endless negotiations, not peace to arise out of universal discord ... [I]t is simple peace, sought in its natural course and in its ordinary haunts. It is peace sought in the spirit of peace, and laid in principles purely pacific.

Burke was not merely presenting a peace agreement to Parliament, but rather he stepped forward with four reasons against using force, carefully reasoned. He laid out his objections in an orderly manner, focusing on one before moving to the next. His first concern was that the use of force would have to be temporary and that the uprisings and objections to British governance in Colonial America would not be. Second, Burke worried about the uncertainty surrounding whether Britain would win a conflict in America. "An armament," Burke said, "is not a victory." Third, Burke brought up the issue of impairment, stating that it would do the British government no good to engage in a scorched earth war and have the object they desired (America) become damaged or even useless. The American colonists could always retreat into the mountains, but the land they left behind would most likely be unusable, whether by accident or design. The fourth and final reason to avoid the use of force was experience, as the British had never attempted to rein in an unruly colony by force and they did not know if it could be done, let alone accomplished thousands of miles away from home. Not only were all of these concerns reasonable, but some turned out to be prophetic—the American colonists did not surrender, even when things looked extremely bleak and the British were ultimately unsuccessful in their attempts to win a war fought on American soil.

It was not temporary force, uncertainty, impairment, or even experience that Burke cited as the primary reason for avoiding war with the American colonies. Rather, it was the character of the American people themselves: "In this character of Americans, a love of freedom is the predominating feature which marks and distinguishes the whole ... [T]his fierce spirit of liberty is stronger in the English colonies, probably, than in any other people of the earth ... [The] men [are] acute, inquisitive, dextrous, prompt in attack, ready in defence, full of resources." Burke concludes with another plea for peace and a prayer that Britain might avoid actions which in Burke's words "may bring on the destruction of this Empire."

Burke proposed six resolutions to settle the American conflict peacefully:

1. Allow the American colonists to elect their own representatives, settling the dispute about taxation without representation.
2. Acknowledge this wrongdoing and apologise for grievances caused.
3. Procure an efficient manner of choosing and sending these delegates.
4. Set up a General Assembly in America itself, with powers to regulate taxes.
5. Stop gathering taxes by imposition (or law) and start gathering them only when they are needed.
6. Grant needed aid to the colonies.

Had they been passed, though the effect of these resolutions can never be known, they might have quelled the colonials' revolutionary spirit. Unfortunately, Burke delivered this speech less than a month before the explosive conflict at Concord and Lexington. As these resolutions were not enacted, little was done that would help to prevent armed conflict.

Among the reasons this speech was so greatly admired was its passage on Lord Bathurst (1684–1775) in which Burke describes an angel in 1704 prophesying to Bathurst the future greatness of England and also of America: "Young man, There is America—which at this day serves little more than to amuse you with stories of savage men, and uncouth manners; yet shall, before you taste of death, shew itself equal to the whole of that commerce which now attracts the envy of the world." Samuel Johnson was so irritated at hearing it continually praised that he made a parody of it, where the devil appears to a young Whig and predicts that in a short time Whiggism will poison even the paradise of America.

The administration of Lord North (1770–1782) tried to defeat the colonist rebellion by military force. British and American forces clashed in 1775 and in 1776 came the United States Declaration of Independence. Burke was appalled by celebrations in Britain of the defeat of the Americans in New York and Pennsylvania. He claimed the English national character was being changed by this authoritarianism. Burke wrote: "As to the good people of England, they seem to partake every day more and more of the Character of that administration which they have been induced to tolerate. I am satisfied, that within a few years there has been a great Change in the National Character. We seem no longer that eager, inquisitive, jealous, fiery people, which we have been formerly."

In Burke's view, the British government was fighting "the American English" ("our English Brethren in the Colonies"), employing "the hireling sword of German boors and vassals" to destroy the "English privileges" of the colonists. On American independence, Burke wrote: "I do not know how to wish success to those whose Victory is to separate from us a large and noble part of our Empire. Still less do I wish success to injustice, oppression and absurdity."

During the Gordon Riots in 1780, Burke became a target of hostility and his home was placed under armed guard by the military.

== Paymaster of the Forces ==
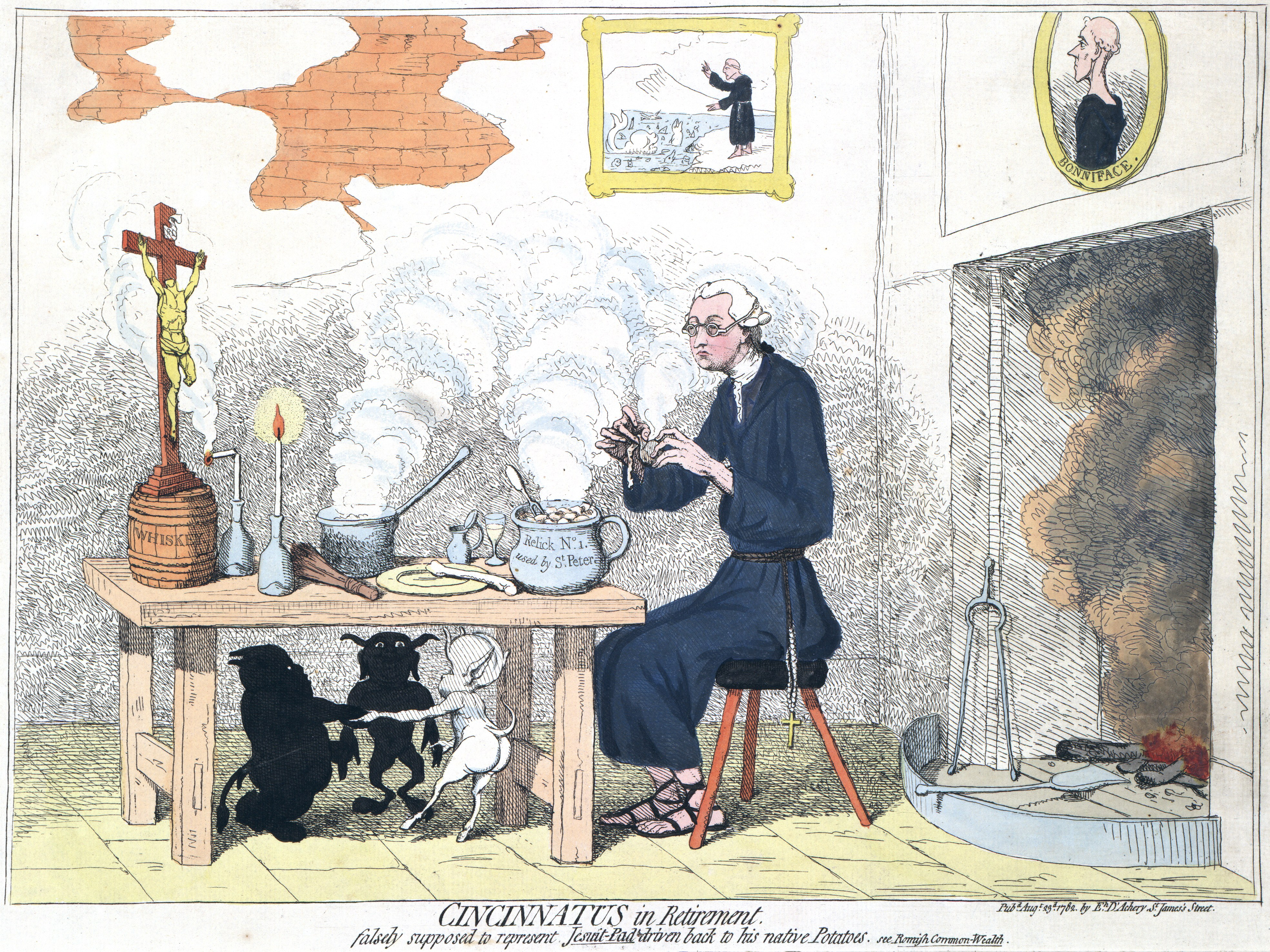
In Cincinnatus in Retirement (1782), James Gillray caricatured Burke's support of rights for Catholics.

The fall of North led to Rockingham being recalled to power in March 1782. Burke was appointed Paymaster of the Forces and a Privy Counsellor, but without a seat in Cabinet. Rockingham's unexpected death in July 1782 and replacement with Shelburne as Prime Minister put an end to his administration after only a few months, but Burke did manage to introduce two Acts.

The Paymaster General Act 1782 ended the post as a lucrative sinecure. Previously, Paymasters had been able to draw on money from HM Treasury at their discretion. Instead, now they were required to put the money they had requested to withdraw from the Treasury into the Bank of England, from where it was to be withdrawn for specific purposes. The Treasury would receive monthly statements of the Paymaster's balance at the Bank. This Act was repealed by Shelburne's administration, but the Act that replaced it repeated verbatim almost the whole text of the Burke Act.

The Civil List and Secret Service Money Act 1782 was a watered-down version of Burke's original intentions as outlined in his famous Speech on Economical Reform of 11 February 1780. However, he managed to abolish 134 offices in the royal household and civil administration. The third Secretary of State and the Board of Trade were abolished and pensions were limited and regulated. The Act was anticipated to save £72,368 a year.

In February 1783, Burke resumed the post of Paymaster of the Forces when Shelburne's government fell and was replaced by a coalition headed by North that included Charles James Fox. That coalition fell in 1783 and was succeeded by the long Tory administration of William Pitt the Younger which lasted until 1801. Accordingly, having supported Fox and North, Burke was in opposition for the remainder of his political life.

== Representative government ==
In 1774, Burke's Speech to the Electors at Bristol at the Conclusion of the Poll was noted for its defence of the principles of representative government against the notion that those elected to assemblies like Parliament are, or should be, merely delegates:

Certainly, Gentlemen, it ought to be the happiness and glory of a Representative, to live in the strictest union, the closest correspondence, and the most unreserved communication with his constituents. Their wishes ought to have great weight with him; their opinion, high respect; their business, unremitted attention. It is his duty to sacrifice his repose, his pleasures, his satisfactions, to theirs; and above all, ever, and in all cases, to prefer their interest to his own. But his unbiassed opinion, his mature judgment, his enlightened conscience, he ought not to sacrifice to you, to any man, or to any sett of men living. These he does not derive from your pleasure; no, nor from the Law and the Constitution. They are a trust from Providence, for the abuse of which he is deeply answerable. Your Representative owes you, not his industry only, but his judgment; and he betrays, instead of serving you, if he sacrifices it to your opinion.

My worthy Colleague says, his Will ought to be subservient to yours. If that be all, the thing is innocent. If Government were a matter of Will upon any side, yours, without question, ought to be superior. But Government and Legislation are matters of reason and judgement, and not of inclination; and, what sort of reason is that, in which the determination precedes the discussion; in which one sett of men deliberate, and another decide; and where those who form the conclusion are perhaps three hundred miles distant from those who hear the arguments?

To deliver an opinion is the right of all men; that of constituents is a weighty and respectable opinion which a Representative ought always to rejoice to hear; and which he ought always most seriously to consider. But authoritative instructions; mandates issued, which the member is bound blindly and implicitly to obey, to vote, and to argue for, though contrary to the clearest conviction of his judgment and conscience; these are things utterly unknown to the laws of this land, and which arise from a fundamental mistake of the whole order and tenour of our constitution.

Parliament is not a congress of ambassadors from different and hostile interests; which interests each must maintain, as an agent and advocate, against other agents and advocates; but Parliament is a deliberative assembly of one nation, with one interest, that of the whole; where, not local purposes, not local prejudices ought to guide, but the general good, resulting from the general reason of the whole. You choose a member, indeed; but when you have chosen him, he is not a member of Bristol, but he is a member of Parliament.

It is often forgotten in this connection that Burke, as detailed below, was an opponent of slavery, and therefore his conscience was refusing to support a trade in which many of his Bristol electors were lucratively involved.

Political scientist Hanna Pitkin points out that Burke linked the interest of the district with the proper behaviour of its elected official, explaining: "Burke conceives of broad, relatively fixed interest, few in number and clearly defined, of which any group or locality has just one. These interests are largely economic or associated with particular localities whose livelihood they characterize, in his over-all prosperity they involve".

Burke was a leading sceptic with respect to democracy. While admitting that theoretically in some cases it might be desirable, he insisted a democratic government in Britain in his day would not only be inept, but also oppressive. He opposed democracy for three basic reasons. First, government required a degree of intelligence and breadth of knowledge of the sort that occurred rarely among the common people. Second, he thought that if they had the vote, common people had dangerous and angry passions that could be aroused easily by demagogues, fearing that the authoritarian impulses that could be empowered by these passions would undermine cherished traditions and established religion, leading to violence and confiscation of property. Third, Burke warned that democracy would create a tyranny over unpopular minorities, who needed the protection of the upper classes.

== Opposition to the slave trade ==
Burke proposed a bill to ban slaveholders from being able to sit in the House of Commons, claiming they were a danger incompatible with traditional notions of English liberty. He described slavery as a "weed that grows on every soil." While Burke did believe that Africans were "barbaric" and needed to be "civilised" by Christianity, Gregory Collins argues that this was not an unusual attitude amongst abolitionists at the time. Furthermore, Burke seemed to believe that Christianity would provide a civilising benefit to any group of people, as he believed Christianity had "tamed" European civilisation and regarded Southern European peoples as equally savage and barbarous. Collins also suggests that Burke viewed the "uncivilised" behaviour of African slaves as being partially caused by slavery itself, as he believed that making someone a slave stripped them of any virtues and rendered them mentally deficient, regardless of race. Burke proposed a gradual program of emancipation called Sketch of a Negro Code, which Collins argues was quite detailed for the time. Collins concludes that Burke's "gradualist" position on the emancipation of slaves, while perhaps seeming ridiculous to some modern-day readers, was nonetheless sincere.

== India and the impeachment of Warren Hastings ==
For years, Burke pursued impeachment efforts against Warren Hastings, formerly Governor-General of Bengal, that resulted in the trial during 1786. His interaction with the British dominion of India began well before Hastings' impeachment trial. For two decades prior to the impeachment, Parliament had dealt with the Indian issue. This trial was the pinnacle of years of unrest and deliberation. In 1781, Burke was first able to delve into the issues surrounding the East India Company when he was appointed Chairman of the Commons Select Committee on East Indian Affairs—from that point until the end of the trial, India was Burke's primary concern. This committee was charged "to investigate alleged injustices in Bengal, the war with Hyder Ali, and other Indian difficulties". While Burke and the committee focused their attention on these matters, a second secret committee was formed to assess the same issues. Both committee reports were written by Burke. Among other purposes, the reports conveyed to the Indian princes that Britain would not wage war on them, along with demanding that the East India Company should recall Hastings. This was Burke's first call for substantive change regarding imperial practices. When addressing the whole House of Commons regarding the committee report, Burke described the Indian issue as one that "began 'in commerce' but 'ended in empire'".

On 28 February 1785, Burke delivered a now-famous speech, The Nabob of Arcot's Debts, wherein he condemned the damage to India by the East India Company. In the province of the Carnatic, the Indians had constructed a system of reservoirs to make the soil fertile in a naturally dry region, and centred their society on the husbandry of water:

These are the monuments of real kings, who were the fathers of their people; testators to a posterity which they embraced as their own. These are the grand sepulchres built by ambition; but by the ambition of an insatiable benevolence, which, not contented with reigning in the dispensation of happiness during the contracted term of human life, had strained, with all the reachings and graspings of a vivacious mind, to extend the dominion of their bounty beyond the limits of nature, and to perpetuate themselves through generations of generations, the guardians, the protectors, the nourishers of mankind.

Burke claimed that the advent of East India Company domination in India had eroded much that was good in these traditions and that as a consequence of this and the lack of new customs to replace them the Indian populace under Company rule was needlessly suffering. He set about establishing a set of imperial expectations, whose moral foundation would in his opinion warrant an overseas empire.

On 4 April 1786, Burke presented the House of Commons with the Article of Charge of High Crimes and Misdemeanors against Hastings. The impeachment in Westminster Hall which did not begin until 14 February 1788 would be the "first major public discursive event of its kind in England", bringing the morality of imperialism to the forefront of public perception. Burke was already known for his eloquent rhetorical skills and his involvement in the trial only enhanced its popularity and significance. Burke's indictment, fuelled by emotional indignation, branded Hastings a "captain-general of iniquity" who never dined without "creating a famine", whose heart was "gangrened to the core" and who resembled both a "spider of Hell" and a "ravenous vulture devouring the carcasses of the dead". The House of Commons eventually impeached Hastings, but subsequently the House of Lords acquitted him of all charges.

== French Revolution: 1688 versus 1789 ==
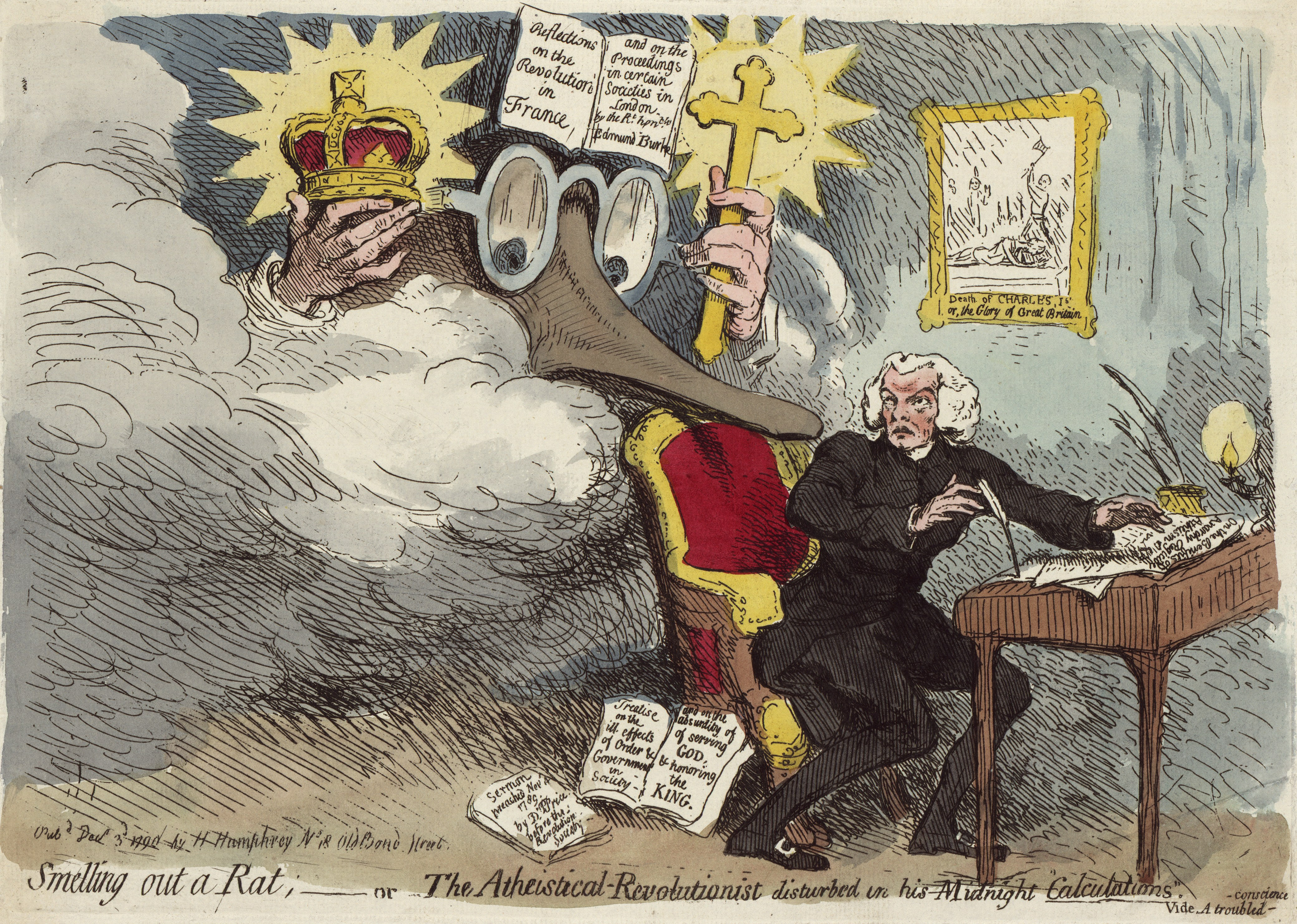
Smelling out a Rat;—or—The Atheistical-Revolutionist disturbed in his Midnight "Calculations" (1790) by Gillray, depicting a caricature of Burke holding a crown and a cross while the seated man Richard Price is writing "On the Benefits of Anarchy Regicide Atheism" beneath a picture of the execution of Charles I of England

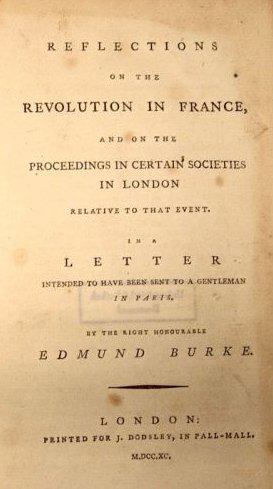
Reflections on the Revolution in France, And on the Proceedings in Certain Societies in London Relative to that Event. In a Letter Intended to Have Been Sent to a Gentleman in Paris. By the Right Honourable Edmund Burke.

Initially, Burke did not condemn the French Revolution. In a letter of 9 August 1789, he wrote: "England gazing with astonishment at a French struggle for Liberty and not knowing whether to blame or to applaud! The thing indeed, though I thought I saw something like it in progress for several years, has still something in it paradoxical and Mysterious. The spirit it is impossible not to admire; but the old Parisian ferocity has broken out in a shocking manner". The events of 5–6 October 1789, when a crowd of Parisian women marched on Versailles to compel King Louis XVI to return to Paris, turned Burke against it. In a letter to his son Richard Burke dated 10 October, he said: "This day I heard from Laurence who has sent me papers confirming the portentous state of France—where the Elements which compose Human Society seem all to be dissolved, and a world of Monsters to be produced in the place of it—where Mirabeau presides as the Grand Anarch; and the late Grand Monarch makes a figure as ridiculous as pitiable". On 4 November, Charles-Jean-François Depont wrote to Burke, requesting that he endorse the Revolution. Burke replied that any critical language of it by him should be taken "as no more than the expression of doubt", but he added: "You may have subverted Monarchy, but not recover'd freedom". In the same month, he described France as "a country undone". Burke's first public condemnation of the Revolution occurred during the debate in Parliament on the army estimates on 9 February 1790 provoked by praise of the Revolution by Pitt and Fox:

Since the House had been prorogued in the summer much work was done in France. The French had shewn themselves the ablest architects of ruin that had hitherto existed in the world. In that very short space of time they had completely pulled down to the ground, their monarchy; their church; their nobility; their law; their revenue; their army; their navy; their commerce; their arts; and their manufactures ... [There was a danger of] an imitation of the excesses of an irrational, unprincipled, proscribing, confiscating, plundering, ferocious, bloody and tyrannical democracy ... [In religion] the danger of their example is no longer from intolerance, but from Atheism; a foul, unnatural vice, foe to all the dignity and consolation of mankind; which seems in France, for a long time, to have been embodied into a faction, accredited, and almost avowed.

In January 1790, Burke read Richard Price's sermon of 4 November 1789 entitled A Discourse on the Love of Our Country to the Revolution Society. That society had been founded to commemorate the Glorious Revolution of 1688. In this sermon, Price espoused the philosophy of universal "Rights of Men". Price argued that love of our country "does not imply any conviction of the superior value of it to other countries, or any particular preference of its laws and constitution of government". Instead, Price asserted that Englishmen should see themselves "more as citizens of the world than as members of any particular community".

A debate between Price and Burke ensued that was "the classic moment at which two fundamentally different conceptions of national identity were presented to the English public". Price claimed that the principles of the Glorious Revolution included "the right to choose our own governors, to cashier them for misconduct, and to frame a government for ourselves".

Immediately after reading Price's sermon, Burke wrote a draft of what eventually became Reflections on the Revolution in France. On 13 February 1790, a notice in the press said that shortly Burke would publish a pamphlet on the Revolution and its British supporters, but he spent the year revising and expanding it. On 1 November, he finally published the Reflections and it was an immediate best-seller. Priced at five shillings, it was more expensive than most political pamphlets, but by the end of 1790, it had gone through ten printings and sold approximately 17,500 copies. A French translation appeared on 29 November and on 30 November the translator Pierre-Gaëton Dupont wrote to Burke saying 2,500 copies had already been sold. The French translation ran to ten printings by June 1791.

What the Glorious Revolution had meant was as important to Burke and his contemporaries as it had been for the last one hundred years in British politics. In the Reflections, Burke argued against Price's interpretation of the Glorious Revolution and instead, gave a classic Whig defence of it. Burke argued against the idea of abstract, metaphysical rights of humans and instead advocated national tradition:

The Revolution was made to preserve our antient indisputable laws and liberties, and that antient constitution of government which is our only security for law and liberty ... The very idea of the fabrication of a new government, is enough to fill us with disgust and horror. We wished at the period of the Revolution, and do now wish, to derive all we possess as an inheritance from our forefathers. Upon that body and stock of inheritance we have taken care not to inoculate any cyon [scion] alien to the nature of the original plant ... Our oldest reformation is that of Magna Charta. You will see that Sir Edward Coke, that great oracle of our law, and indeed all the great men who follow him, to Blackstone, are industrious to prove the pedigree of our liberties. They endeavour to prove that the ancient charter ... were nothing more than a re-affirmance of the still more ancient standing law of the kingdom ... In the famous law ... called the Petition of Right, the parliament says to the king, "Your subjects have inherited this freedom", claiming their franchises not on abstract principles "as the rights of men", but as the rights of Englishmen, and as a patrimony derived from their forefathers.

Burke said: "We fear God, we look up with awe to kings; with affection to Parliaments; with duty to magistrates; with reverence to priests; and with respect to nobility. Why? Because when such ideas are brought before our minds, it is natural to be so affected". Burke defended this prejudice on the grounds that it is "the general bank and capital of nations, and of ages" and superior to individual reason, which is small in comparison. "Prejudice", Burke claimed, "is of ready application in the emergency; it previously engages the mind in a steady course of wisdom and virtue, and does not leave the man hesitating in the moment of decision, sceptical, puzzled, and unresolved. Prejudice renders a man's virtue his habit". Burke criticised social contract theory by claiming that society is indeed a contract, although it is "a partnership not only between those who are living, but between those who are living, those who are dead, and those who are to be born".

The most famous passage in Burke's Reflections was his description of the events of 5–6 October 1789 and the part of Marie-Antoinette in them. Burke's account differs little from modern historians who have used primary sources. His use of flowery language to describe it provoked both praise and criticism. Philip Francis wrote to Burke saying that what he wrote of Marie-Antoinette was "pure foppery". Edward Gibbon reacted differently: "I adore his chivalry". Burke was informed by an Englishman who had talked with the Duchesse de Biron that when Marie-Antoinette was reading the passage she burst into tears and took considerable time to finish reading it. Price had rejoiced that the French king had been "led in triumph" during the October Days, but to Burke, this symbolised the opposing revolutionary sentiment of the Jacobins and the natural sentiments of those who shared his own view with horror—that the ungallant assault on Marie-Antoinette was a cowardly attack on a defenceless woman.

Louis XVI translated the Reflections "from end to end" into French. Fellow Whig MPs Richard Sheridan and Charles James Fox disagreed with Burke and split with him. Fox thought the Reflections to be "in very bad taste" and "favouring Tory principles". Other Whigs such as the Duke of Portland and Earl Fitzwilliam privately agreed with Burke, but they did not wish for a public breach with their Whig colleagues. Burke wrote on 29 November 1790: "I have received from the Duke of Portland, Lord Fitzwilliam, the Duke of Devonshire, Lord John Cavendish, Montagu (Frederick Montagu MP), and a long et cetera of the old Stamina of the Whiggs a most full approbation of the principles of that work and a kind indulgence to the execution". The Duke of Portland said in 1791 that when anyone criticised the Reflections to him, he informed them that he had recommended the book to his sons as containing the true Whig creed.

In the opinion of Paul Langford, Burke crossed something of a Rubicon when he attended a levee on 3 February 1791 to meet the King, later described by Jane Burke as follows:

On his coming to Town for the Winter, as he generally does, he went to the Levee with the Duke of Portland, who went with Lord William to kiss hands on his going into the Guards—while Lord William was kissing hands, The King was talking to The Duke, but his Eyes were fixed on [Burke] who was standing in the Crowd, and when He said His say to The Duke, without waiting for [Burke]'s coming up in his turn, The King went up to him, and, after the usual questions of how long have you been in Town and the weather, He said you have been very much employed of late, and very much confined. [Burke] said, no, Sir, not more than usual—You have and very well employed too, but there are none so deaf as those that w'ont hear, and none so blind as those that w'ont see—[Burke] made a low bow, Sir, I certainly now understand you, but was afraid my vanity or presumption might have led me to imagine what Your Majesty has said referred to what I have done—You cannot be vain—You have been of use to us all, it is a general opinion, is it not so Lord Stair? who was standing near. It is said Lord Stair;—Your Majesty's adopting it, Sir, will make the opinion general, said [Burke]—I know it is the general opinion, and I know that there is no Man who calls himself a Gentleman that must not think himself obliged to you, for you have supported the cause of the Gentlemen—You know the tone at Court is a whisper, but The King said all this loud, so as to be heard by every one at Court.

Burke's Reflections sparked a pamphlet war. Mary Wollstonecraft was one of the first into print, publishing A Vindication of the Rights of Men a few weeks after Burke. Thomas Paine followed with the Rights of Man in 1791. James Mackintosh, who wrote Vindiciae Gallicae, was the first to see the Reflections as "the manifesto of a Counter Revolution". Mackintosh later agreed with Burke's views, remarking in December 1796 after meeting him that Burke was "minutely and accurately informed, to a wonderful exactness, with respect to every fact relating to the French Revolution". Mackintosh later said: "Burke was one of the first thinkers as well as one of the greatest orators of his time. He is without parallel in any age, excepting perhaps Lord Bacon and Cicero; and his works contain an ampler store of political and moral wisdom than can be found in any other writer whatever".

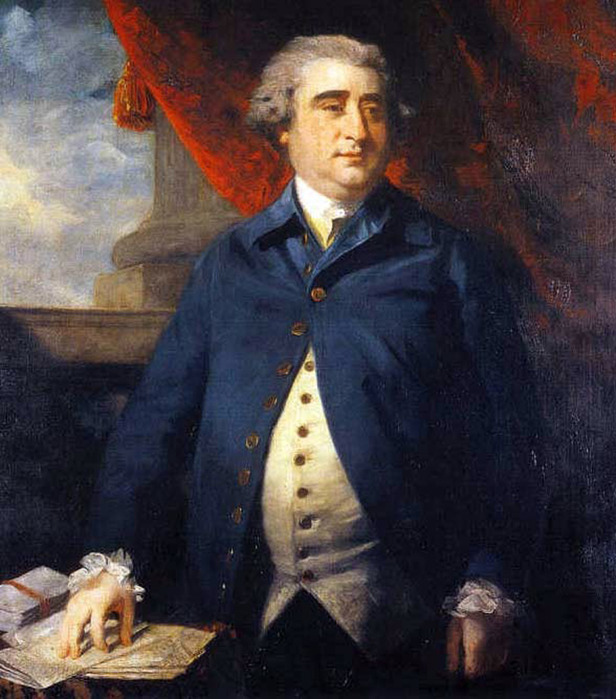
Charles James Fox

In November 1790, François-Louis-Thibault de Menonville, a member of the National Assembly of France, wrote to Burke, praising Reflections and requesting more "very refreshing mental food" that he could publish. This Burke did in April 1791 when he published A Letter to a Member of the National Assembly. Burke called for external forces to reverse the Revolution and included an attack on the late French philosopher Jean-Jacques Rousseau as being the subject of a personality cult that had developed in revolutionary France. Although Burke conceded that Rousseau sometimes showed "a considerable insight into human nature", he mostly was critical. Although he did not meet Rousseau on his visit to Britain in 1766–1767, Burke was a friend of David Hume, with whom Rousseau had stayed. Burke said Rousseau "entertained no principle either to influence of his heart, or to guide his understanding—but vanity"—which he "was possessed to a degree little short of madness". He also cited Rousseau's Confessions as evidence that Rousseau had a life of "obscure and vulgar vices" that was not "chequered, or spotted here and there, with virtues, or even distinguished by a single good action". Burke contrasted Rousseau's theory of universal benevolence and his having sent his children to a foundling hospital, stating that he was "a lover of his kind, but a hater of his kindred".

These events and the disagreements that arose from them within the Whigs led to its break-up and to the rupture of Burke's friendship with Fox. In a debate in Parliament on Britain's relations with Russia, Fox praised the principles of the Revolution, although Burke was not able to reply at this time as he was "overpowered by continued cries of question from his own side of the House". When Parliament was debating the Quebec Bill for a constitution for Canada, Fox praised the Revolution and criticised some of Burke's arguments such as hereditary power. On 6 May 1791, Burke used the opportunity to answer Fox during another debate in Parliament on the Quebec Bill and condemn the new French Constitution and "the horrible consequences flowing from the French idea of the Rights of Man". Burke asserted that those ideas were the antithesis of both the British and the American constitutions. Burke was interrupted and Fox intervened, saying that Burke should be allowed to carry on with his speech. However, a vote of censure was moved against Burke for noticing the affairs of France which was moved by Lord Sheffield and seconded by Fox. Pitt made a speech praising Burke and Fox made a speech—both rebuking and complimenting Burke. He questioned the sincerity of Burke, who seemed to have forgotten the lessons he had learned from him, quoting from Burke's own speeches of fourteen and fifteen years before. Burke's response was as follows:

It certainly was indiscreet at any period, but especially at his time of life, to parade enemies, or give his friends occasion to desert him; yet if his firm and steady adherence to the British constitution placed him in such a dilemma, he would risk all, and, as public duty and public experience taught him, with his last words exclaim, "Fly from the French Constitution".

At this point, Fox whispered that there was "no loss of friendship". "I regret to say there is", Burke replied, "I have indeed made a great sacrifice; I have done my duty though I have lost my friend. There is something in the detested French constitution that envenoms every thing it touches". This provoked a reply from Fox, yet he was unable to give his speech for some time since he was overcome with tears and emotion. Fox appealed to Burke to remember their inalienable friendship, but he also repeated his criticisms of Burke and uttered "unusually bitter sarcasms". This only aggravated the rupture between the two men. Burke demonstrated his separation from the party on 5 June 1791 by writing to Fitzwilliam, declining money from him.

Burke was dismayed that some Whigs, instead of reaffirming the principles of the Whig Party he laid out in the Reflections, had rejected them in favour of "French principles" and that they criticised Burke for abandoning Whig principles. Burke wanted to demonstrate his fidelity to Whig principles and feared that acquiescence to Fox and his followers would allow the Whig Party to become a vehicle for Jacobinism.

Burke knew that many members of the Whig Party did not share Fox's views and he wanted to provoke them into condemning the French Revolution. Burke wrote that he wanted to represent the whole Whig Party "as tolerating, and by a toleration, countenancing those proceedings" so that he could "stimulate them to a public declaration of what every one of their acquaintance privately knows to be ... their sentiments". On 3 August 1791, Burke published his Appeal from the New to the Old Whigs in which he renewed his criticism of the radical revolutionary programmes inspired by the French Revolution and attacked the Whigs who supported them as holding principles contrary to those traditionally held by the Whig Party.

Burke owned two copies of what has been called "that practical compendium of Whig political theory", namely The Tryal of Dr. Henry Sacheverell (1710). Burke wrote of the trial: "It rarely happens to a party to have the opportunity of a clear, authentic, recorded, declaration of their political tenets upon the subject of a great constitutional event like that of the [Glorious] Revolution". Writing in the third person, Burke asserted in his Appeal:

[The] foundations laid down by the Commons, on the trial of Doctor Sacheverel, for justifying the revolution of 1688, are the very same laid down in Mr. Burke's Reflections; that is to say,—a breach of the original contract, implied and expressed in the constitution of this country, as a scheme of government fundamentally and inviolably fixed in King, Lords and Commons.—That the fundamental subversion of this antient constitution, by one of its parts, having been attempted, and in effect accomplished, justified the Revolution. That it was justified only upon the necessity of the case; as the only means left for the recovery of that antient constitution, formed by the original contract of the British state; as well as for the future preservation of the same government. These are the points to be proved.

Burke then provided quotations from Paine's Rights of Man to demonstrate what the New Whigs believed. Burke's belief that Foxite principles corresponded to Paine's was genuine. Finally, Burke denied that a majority of "the people" had, or ought to have, the final say in politics and alter society at their pleasure. People had rights, but also duties and these duties were not voluntary. According to Burke, the people could not overthrow morality derived from God.

Although Whig grandees such as Portland and Fitzwilliam privately agreed with Burke's Appeal, they wished he had used more moderate language. Fitzwilliam saw the Appeal as containing "the doctrines I have sworn by, long and long since". Francis Basset, a backbench Whig MP, wrote to Burke that "though for reasons which I will not now detail I did not then deliver my sentiments, I most perfectly differ from Mr. Fox & from the great Body of opposition on the French Revolution". Burke sent a copy of the Appeal to the King and the King requested a friend to communicate to Burke that he had read it "with great Satisfaction". Burke wrote of its reception: "Not one word from one of our party. They are secretly galled. They agree with me to a title; but they dare not speak out for fear of hurting Fox ... They leave me to myself; they see that I can do myself justice". Charles Burney viewed it as "a most admirable book—the best & most useful on political subjects that I have ever seen", but he believed the differences in the Whig Party between Burke and Fox should not be aired publicly.

Eventually, most of the Whigs sided with Burke and gave their support to William Pitt the Younger's Tory government which in response to France's declaration of war against Britain declared war on France's Revolutionary Government in 1793.

In December 1791, Burke sent government ministers his Thoughts on French Affairs where he put forward three main points, namely that no counter-revolution in France would come about by purely domestic causes; that the longer the Revolutionary Government exists, the stronger it becomes; and that the Revolutionary Government's interest and aim is to disturb all of the other governments of Europe.

As a Whig, Burke did not wish to see an absolute monarchy again in France after the extirpation of Jacobinism. Writing to an émigré in 1791, Burke expressed his views against a restoration of the Ancien Régime:

When such a complete convulsion has shaken the State, and hardly left any thing whatsoever, either in civil arrangements, or in the Characters and disposition of men's minds, exactly where it was, whatever shall be settled although in the former persons and upon old forms, will be in some measure a new thing and will labour under something of the weakness as well as other inconveniences of a Change. My poor opinion is that you mean to establish what you call 'L'ancien Régime,' If any one means that system of Court Intrigue miscalled a Government as it stood, at Versailles before the present confusions as the thing to be established, that I believe will be found absolutely impossible; and if you consider the Nature, as well of persons, as of affairs, I flatter myself you must be of my opinion. That was tho' not so violent a State of Anarchy as well as the present. If it were even possible to lay things down exactly as they stood, before the series of experimental politicks began, I am quite sure that they could not long continue in that situation. In one Sense of L'Ancien Régime I am clear that nothing else can reasonably be done.

Burke delivered a speech on the debate of the Aliens Bill on 28 December 1792. He supported the Bill as it would exclude "murderous atheists, who would pull down Church and state; religion and God; morality and happiness". The peroration included a reference to a French order for 3,000 daggers. Burke revealed a dagger he had concealed in his coat and threw it to the floor: "This is what you are to gain by an alliance with France". Burke picked up the dagger and continued:

When they smile, I see blood trickling down their faces; I see their insidious purposes; I see that the object of all their cajoling is—blood! I now warn my countrymen to beware of these execrable philosophers, whose only object it is to destroy every thing that is good here, and to establish immorality and murder by precept and example—'Hic niger est hunc tu Romane caveto' ['Such a man is evil; beware of him, Roman'. Horace, Satires I. 4. 85.].

Burke supported the war against Revolutionary France, seeing Britain as fighting on the side of the royalists and émigres in a civil war, rather than fighting against the whole nation of France. Burke also supported the royalist uprising in La Vendée, describing it on 4 November 1793 in a letter to William Windham as "the sole affair I have much heart in". Burke wrote to Henry Dundas on 7 October urging him to send reinforcements there as he viewed it as the only theatre in the war that might lead to a march on Paris, but Dundas did not follow Burke's advice.

Burke believed the British government was not taking the uprising seriously enough, a view reinforced by a letter he had received from the Prince Charles of France (S.A.R. le comte d'Artois), dated 23 October, requesting that he intercede on behalf of the royalists to the government. Burke was forced to reply on 6 November: "I am not in His Majesty's Service; or at all consulted in his Affairs". Burke published his Remarks on the Policy of the Allies with Respect to France, begun in October, where he said: "I am sure every thing has shewn us that in this war with France, one Frenchman is worth twenty foreigners. La Vendée is a proof of this".

On 20 June 1794, Burke received a vote of thanks from the House of Commons for his services in the Hastings Trial and he immediately resigned his seat, being replaced by his son Richard. A blow fell upon Burke with the loss of Richard in August 1794, to whom he was tenderly attached and in whom he saw signs of promise which were not patent to others and which in fact appear to have been non-existent, although this view may have rather reflected the fact that his son Richard had worked successfully in the early battle for Catholic emancipation. King George III, whose favour he had gained by his attitude on the French Revolution, wished to create him Earl of Beaconsfield, but the death of his son deprived the opportunity of such an honour and all its attractions, so the only award he would accept was a pension of £2,500. Even this modest reward was attacked by the Duke of Bedford and the Earl of Lauderdale, to whom Burke replied in his Letter to a Noble Lord (1796): "It cannot at this time be too often repeated; line upon line; precept upon precept; until it comes into the currency of a proverb, To innovate is not to reform". He argued that he was rewarded on merit, but the Duke of Bedford received his rewards from inheritance alone, his ancestor being the original pensioner: "Mine was from a mild and benevolent sovereign; his from Henry the Eighth". Burke also hinted at what would happen to such people if their revolutionary ideas were implemented and included a description of the English Constitution:

But as to our country and our race, as long as the well compacted structure of our church and state, the sanctuary, the holy of holies of that ancient law, defended by reverence, defended by power, a fortress at once and a temple, shall stand inviolate on the brow of the British Sion—as long as the British Monarchy, not more limited than fenced by the orders of the State, shall, like the proud Keep of Windsor, rising in the majesty of proportion, and girt with the double belt of its kindred and coeval towers, as long as this awful structure shall oversee and guard the subjected land—so long as the mounds and dykes of the low, fat, Bedford level will have nothing to fear from all the pickaxes of all the levellers of France.

Burke's last publications were the Letters on a Regicide Peace (October 1796), called forth by negotiations for peace with France by the Pitt government. Burke regarded this as appeasement, injurious to national dignity and honour. In his Second Letter, Burke wrote of the French Revolutionary government: "Individuality is left out of their scheme of government. The State is all in all. Everything is referred to the production of force; afterwards, everything is trusted to the use of it. It is military in its principle, in its maxims, in its spirit, and in all its movements. The State has dominion and conquest for its sole objects—dominion over minds by proselytism, over bodies by arms".

This is held to be the first explanation of the modern concept of totalitarian state. Burke regarded the war with France as ideological, against an "armed doctrine". He wished that France would not be partitioned due to the effect this would have on the balance of power in Europe and that the war was not against France, but against the revolutionaries governing her. Burke said: "It is not France extending a foreign empire over other nations: it is a sect aiming at universal empire, and beginning with the conquest of France".

== Later life ==
In November 1795, there was a debate in Parliament on the high price of corn and Burke wrote a memorandum to Pitt on the subject. In December, Samuel Whitbread MP introduced a bill giving magistrates the power to fix minimum wages and Fox said he would vote for it. This debate probably led Burke to edit his memorandum as there appeared a notice that Burke would soon publish a letter on the subject to the Secretary of the Board of Agriculture Arthur Young, but he failed to complete it. These fragments were inserted into the memorandum after his death and published posthumously in 1800 as Thoughts and Details on Scarcity. In it, Burke expounded "some of the doctrines of political economists bearing upon agriculture as a trade". Burke criticised policies such as maximum prices and state regulation of wages and set out what the limits of government should be:

That the State ought to confine itself to what regards the State, or the creatures of the State, namely, the exterior establishment of its religion; its magistracy; its revenue; its military force by sea and land; the corporations that owe their existence to its fiat; in a word, to every thing that is truly and properly public, to the public peace, to the public safety, to the public order, to the public prosperity.

The economist Adam Smith remarked that Burke was "the only man I ever knew who thinks on economic subjects exactly as I do, without any previous communications having passed between us".

Writing to a friend in May 1795, Burke surveyed the causes of discontent: "I think I can hardly overrate the malignity of the principles of Protestant ascendency, as they affect Ireland; or of Indianism [i.e. corporate tyranny, as practised by the British East Indies Company], as they affect these countries, and as they affect Asia; or of Jacobinism, as they affect all Europe, and the state of human society itself. The last is the greatest evil". By March 1796, Burke had changed his mind: "Our Government and our Laws are beset by two different Enemies, which are sapping its foundations, Indianism, and Jacobinism. In some Cases they act separately, in some they act in conjunction: But of this I am sure; that the first is the worst by far, and the hardest to deal with; and for this amongst other reasons, that it weakens discredits, and ruins that force, which ought to be employed with the greatest Credit and Energy against the other; and that it furnishes Jacobinism with its strongest arms against all formal Government".

== Illness and death ==
For more than a year prior to his death, Burke knew that his stomach was "irrecoverably ruined". He is believed to have had stomach cancer.

After hearing that Burke was nearing death, Fox wrote to Mrs. Burke enquiring after him. Fox received the reply the next day:

Mrs. Burke presents her compliments to Mr. Fox, and thanks him for his obliging inquiries. Mrs. Burke communicated his letter to Mr. Burke, and by his desire has to inform Mr. Fox that it has cost Mr. Burke the most heart-felt pain to obey the stern voice of his duty in rending asunder a long friendship, but that he deemed this sacrifice necessary; that his principles continue the same; and that in whatever of life may yet remain to him, he conceives that he must live for others and not for himself. Mr. Burke is convinced that the principles which he has endeavoured to maintain are necessary to the welfare and dignity of his country, and that these principles can be enforced only by the general persuasion of his sincerity.

Burke died in Beaconsfield, Buckinghamshire, on 9 July 1797 and was buried there alongside his son and brother.

== Personal life ==
Burke married Jane Mary Nugent (1734–1812) in 1757. They had 2 sons: Christopher died age 5, and Richard age 36. Jane managed Burke's household affairs for him, and was involved in his work.

== Legacy ==
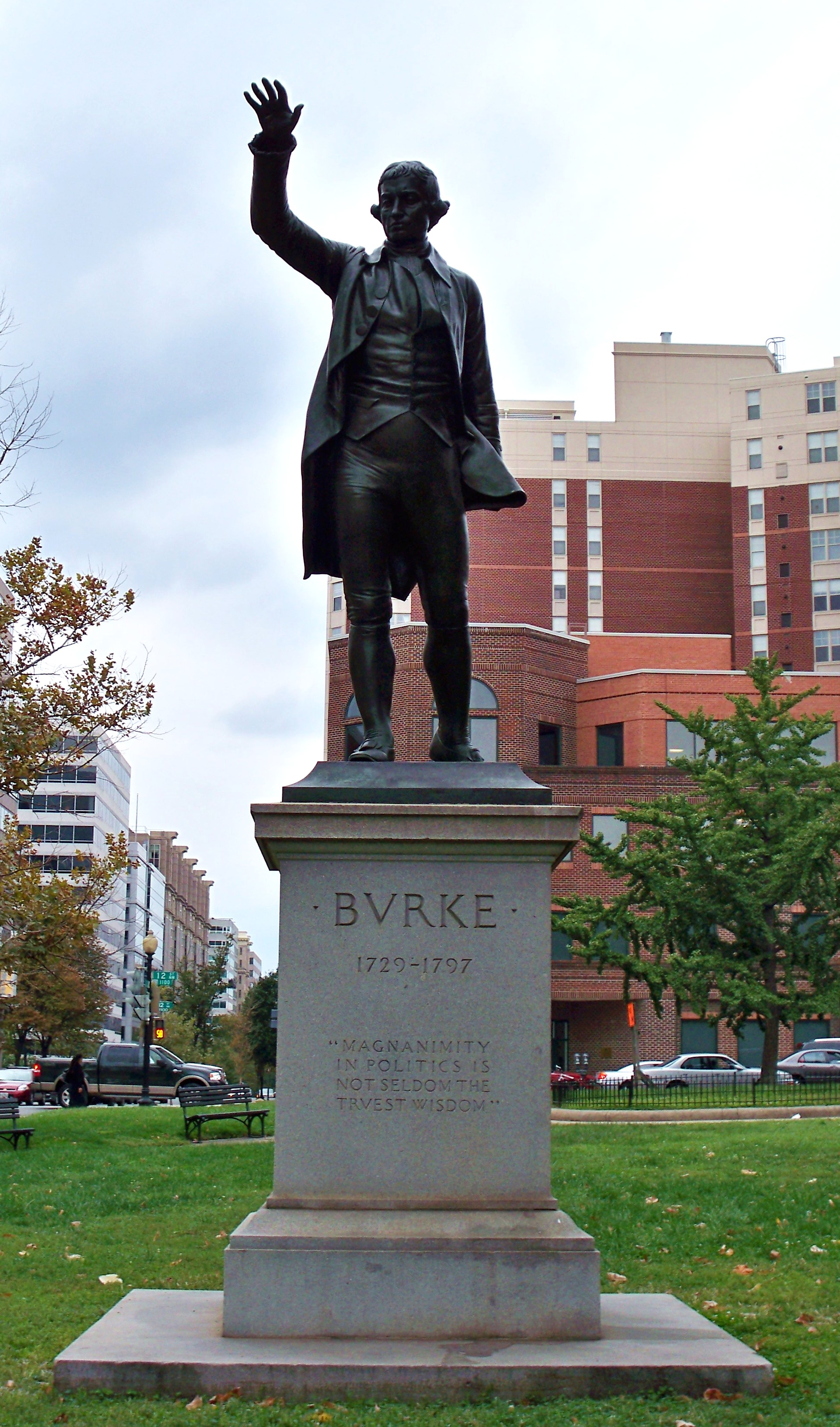
Statue of Edmund Burke in Washington, D.C.

Burke is regarded by most political historians in the English-speaking world as a liberal conservative and the father of modern British conservatism. Burke was utilitarian and empirical in his arguments while Joseph de Maistre, a fellow European conservative, was more providentialist and sociological and deployed a more confrontational tone in his arguments.

Burke believed that property was essential to human life. Because of his conviction that people desire to be ruled and controlled, the division of property formed the basis for social structure, helping develop control within a property-based hierarchy. He viewed the social changes brought on by property as the natural order of events which should be taking place as the human race progressed. With the division of property and the class system, he also believed that it kept the monarch in check to the needs of the classes beneath the monarch. Since property largely aligned or defined divisions of social class, class too was seen as natural—part of a social agreement that the setting of persons into different classes, is the mutual benefit of all subjects. Concern for property is not Burke's only influence. Christopher Hitchens summarises as follows: "If modern conservatism can be held to derive from Burke, it is not just because he appealed to property owners in behalf of stability but also because he appealed to an everyday interest in the preservation of the ancestral and the immemorial".

Burke's support for the causes of the "oppressed majorities", such as Irish Catholics and Indians, led him to be at the receiving end of hostile criticism from Tories; while his opposition to the spread of the French Republic (and its radical ideals) across Europe led to similar charges from Whigs. As a consequence, Burke often became isolated in Parliament.

In the 19th century, Burke was praised by both liberals and conservatives. Burke's friend Philip Francis wrote that Burke "was a man who truly & prophetically foresaw all the consequences which would rise from the adoption of the French principles", but because Burke wrote with so much passion, people were doubtful of his arguments. William Windham spoke from the same bench in the House of Commons as Burke had when he had separated from Fox and an observer said Windham spoke "like the ghost of Burke" when he made a speech against peace with France in 1801. William Hazlitt, a political opponent of Burke, regarded him as amongst his three favourite writers (the others being Junius and Rousseau) and made it "a test of the sense and candour of any one belonging to the opposite party, whether he allowed Burke to be a great man". William Wordsworth was originally a supporter of the French Revolution and attacked Burke in A Letter to the Bishop of Llandaff (1793), but by the early 19th century he had changed his mind and came to admire Burke. In his Two Addresses to the Freeholders of Westmorland, Wordsworth called Burke "the most sagacious Politician of his age", whose predictions "time has verified". He later revised his poem The Prelude to include praise of Burke ("Genius of Burke! forgive the pen seduced/By specious wonders") and portrayed him as an old oak. Samuel Taylor Coleridge came to have a similar conversion as he had criticised Burke in The Watchman, but in his Friend (1809–1810) had defended Burke from charges of inconsistency. Later in his Biographia Literaria (1817), Coleridge hails Burke as a prophet and praises Burke for referring "habitually to principles. He was a scientific statesman; and therefore a seer". Henry Brougham wrote of Burke that "all his predictions, save one momentary expression, had been more than fulfilled: anarchy and bloodshed had borne sway in France; conquest and convulsion had desolated Europe ... [T]he providence of mortals is not often able to penetrate so far as this into futurity". George Canning believed that Burke's Reflections "has been justified by the course of subsequent events; and almost every prophecy has been strictly fulfilled". In 1823, Canning wrote that he took Burke's "last works and words [as] the manual of my politics". The Conservative Prime Minister Benjamin Disraeli "was deeply penetrated with the spirit and sentiment of Burke's later writings".

The 19th-century Liberal Prime Minister William Gladstone considered Burke "a magazine of wisdom on Ireland and America" and in his diary recorded: "Made many extracts from Burke—sometimes almost divine". The Radical MP and anti-Corn Law activist Richard Cobden often praised Burke's Thoughts and Details on Scarcity. The Liberal historian Lord Acton considered Burke one of the three greatest Liberals, along with Gladstone and Thomas Babington Macaulay. Lord Macaulay recorded in his diary: "I have now finished reading again most of Burke's works. Admirable! The greatest man since Milton". The Gladstonian Liberal MP John Morley published two books on Burke (including a biography) and was influenced by Burke, including his views on prejudice. The Cobdenite Radical Francis Hirst thought Burke deserved "a place among English libertarians, even though of all lovers of liberty and of all reformers he was the most conservative, the least abstract, always anxious to preserve and renovate rather than to innovate. In politics, he resembled the modern architect who would restore an old house instead of pulling it down to construct a new one on the site". Burke's Reflections on the Revolution in France was controversial at the time of its publication, but after his death, it was to become his best-known and most influential work and a manifesto for Conservative thinking.

Two contrasting assessments of Burke also were offered long after his death by Karl Marx and Winston Churchill. In a footnote to Volume One of Das Kapital, Marx wrote:

The sycophant—who in the pay of the English oligarchy played the romantic laudator temporis acti against the French Revolution just as, in the pay of the North American colonies at the beginning of the American troubles, he had played the liberal against the English oligarchy—was an out-and-out vulgar bourgeois. "The laws of commerce are the laws of Nature, and therefore the laws of God." (E. Burke, l.c., pp. 31, 32) No wonder that, true to the laws of God and Nature, he always sold himself in the best market.

In Consistency in Politics, Churchill wrote:

On the one hand [Burke] is revealed as a foremost apostle of Liberty, on the other as the redoubtable champion of Authority. But a charge of political inconsistency applied to this life appears a mean and petty thing. History easily discerns the reasons and forces which actuated him, and the immense changes in the problems he was facing which evoked from the same profound mind and sincere spirit these entirely contrary manifestations. His soul revolted against tyranny, whether it appeared in the aspect of a domineering Monarch and a corrupt Court and Parliamentary system, or whether, mouthing the watch-words of a non-existent liberty, it towered up against him in the dictation of a brutal mob and wicked sect. No one can read the Burke of Liberty and the Burke of Authority without feeling that here was the same man pursuing the same ends, seeking the same ideals of society and Government, and defending them from assaults, now from one extreme, now from the other.

The historian Piers Brendon asserts that Burke laid the moral foundation for the British Empire, epitomised in the trial of Warren Hastings, that was ultimately to be its undoing. When Burke stated that "[t]he British Empire must be governed on a plan of freedom, for it will be governed by no other", this was "an ideological bacillus that would prove fatal. This was Edmund Burke's paternalistic doctrine that colonial government was a trust. It was to be so exercised for the benefit of subject people that they would eventually attain their birthright—freedom". As a consequence of these opinions, Burke objected to the opium trade which he called a "smuggling adventure" and condemned "the great Disgrace of the British character in India". According to political scientist Jennifer Pitts, Burke "was arguably the first political thinker to undertake a comprehensive critique of British imperial practice in the name of justice for those who suffered from its moral and political exclusions." The extent of Burke's critique of imperial practices has been challenged by other political scientists and literary theorists who highlight Burke's strong support of British imperial practices in the New World.

A Royal Society of Arts blue plaque commemorates Burke at 37 Gerrard Street now in London's Chinatown.

Statues of Burke are in Bristol, England, Trinity College Dublin and Washington, D.C. Burke is also the namesake of a private college preparatory school in Washington, Edmund Burke School.

Burke Avenue, in The Bronx, New York, is named for him.

=== Criticism ===
One of Burke's largest and most developed critics was the German-American political theorist Leo Strauss. In his book Natural Right and History, Strauss makes a series of points in which he somewhat harshly evaluates Burke's writings.

One of the topics that he first addresses is the fact that Burke creates a definitive separation between happiness and virtue and explains that "Burke, therefore, seeks the foundation of government 'in a conformity to our duties' and not in 'imaginary rights of man". Strauss views Burke as believing that government should focus solely on the duties that a man should have in society as opposed to trying to address any additional needs or desires. Government is simply a practicality to Burke and not necessarily meant to function as a tool to help individuals live as well as possible. Strauss also argues that in a sense Burke's theory could be seen as opposing the very idea of forming such philosophies. Burke expresses the view that theory cannot adequately predict future occurrences and therefore men need to have instincts that cannot be practised or derived from ideology.

This leads to an overarching criticism that Strauss holds regarding Burke which is his rejection of the use of logic. Burke dismisses a widely held view amongst theorists that reason should be the primary tool in the forming of a constitution or contract. Burke instead believes that constitutions should be made based on natural processes as opposed to rational planning for the future. However, Strauss points out that criticising rationality actually works against Burke's original stance of returning to traditional ways because some amount of human reason is inherent and therefore is in part grounded in tradition. In regards to this formation of legitimate social order, Strauss does not necessarily support Burke's opinion—that order cannot be established by individual wise people, but exclusively by a culmination of individuals with historical knowledge of past functions to use as a foundation. Strauss notes that Burke would oppose more newly formed republics due to this thought, although Lenzner adds the fact that he did seem to believe that America's constitution could be justified given the specific circumstances. On the other hand, France's constitution was much too radical as it relied too heavily on enlightened reasoning as opposed to traditional methods and values.

== Religious thought ==
Burke's religious writing comprises published works and commentary on the subject of religion. Burke's religious thought was grounded in the belief that religion is the foundation of civil society. He sharply criticised deism and atheism and emphasised Christianity as a vehicle of social progress. Born in Ireland to a Catholic mother and a Protestant father, Burke vigorously defended the Church of England, but he also demonstrated sensitivity to Catholic concerns. He linked the conservation of a state-established religion with the preservation of citizens' constitutional liberties and highlighted Christianity's benefit not only to the believer's soul, but also to political arrangements.

== Misattributed quotation ==
=== "When good men do nothing" ===
The well-known maxim that "The only thing necessary for the triumph of evil is for good men to do nothing" is widely misattributed to Burke. It is known that, in 1770, Burke wrote the following passage in "Thoughts on the Cause of the Present Discontents":

[W]hen bad men combine, the good must associate; else they will fall, one by one, an unpitied sacrifice in a contemptible struggle.

In 1867, John Stuart Mill made a similar statement in an inaugural address delivered at the University of St Andrews:

Bad men need nothing more to compass their ends, than that good men should look on and do nothing.

== Bibliography ==
- A Vindication of Natural Society (1756)
- A Philosophical Enquiry into the Origin of Our Ideas of the Sublime and Beautiful (1757)
- An Account of the European Settlement in America (1757)
- The Abridgement of the History of England (1757)
- Annual Register editor for some 30 years (1758)
- Tracts on the Popery Laws (Early 1760s)
- On the Present State of the Nation (1769)
- Thoughts on the Cause of the Present Discontents (1770)
- On American Taxation (1774)
- Conciliation with the Colonies (1775)
- A Letter to the Sheriffs of Bristol (1777)
- Reform of the Representation in the House of Commons (1782)
- Reflections on the Revolution in France (1790)
- Letter to a Member of the National Assembly (1791)
- An Appeal from the New to the Old Whigs (1791)
- Thoughts on French Affairs (1791)
- Remarks on the Policy of the Allies (1793)
- Thoughts and Details on Scarcity (1795)
- Letters on a Regicide Peace (1795–97)
- Letter to a Noble Lord (1796)

== See also ==
- House of Burgh, an Anglo-Norman and Hiberno-Norman dynasty founded in 1193
- Conservative Party
- List of abolitionist forerunners

Political offices
Preceded by Richard Rigby	Paymaster of the Forces; 1782	Succeeded by Isaac Barré
Preceded by Isaac Barré	Paymaster of the Forces; 1783–1784	Succeeded by William Wyndham Grenville
Parliament of Great Britain
Preceded by Richard Chandler-Cavendish; Verney Lovett	Member of Parliament for Wendover; 1765–1774	Succeeded by Joseph Bullock; John Adams
Preceded by Savile Finch; The Viscount Downe	Member of Parliament for Malton; 1774	Succeeded by Savile Finch; William Weddell
Preceded by Matthew Brickdale; The Viscount Clare PC	Member of Parliament for Bristol; 1774–1780; With: Henry Cruger	Succeeded by Matthew Brickdale; Sir Henry Lippincott
Preceded by Savile Finch; William Weddell	Member of Parliament for Malton; 1780–1794	Succeeded by The Viscount Milton; Richard Burke
Academic offices
Preceded by Henry Dundas	Rector of the University of Glasgow; 1783–1785	Succeeded by Robert Cunninghame-Grahame of Gartmore
