= Religious thought of Edmund Burke =

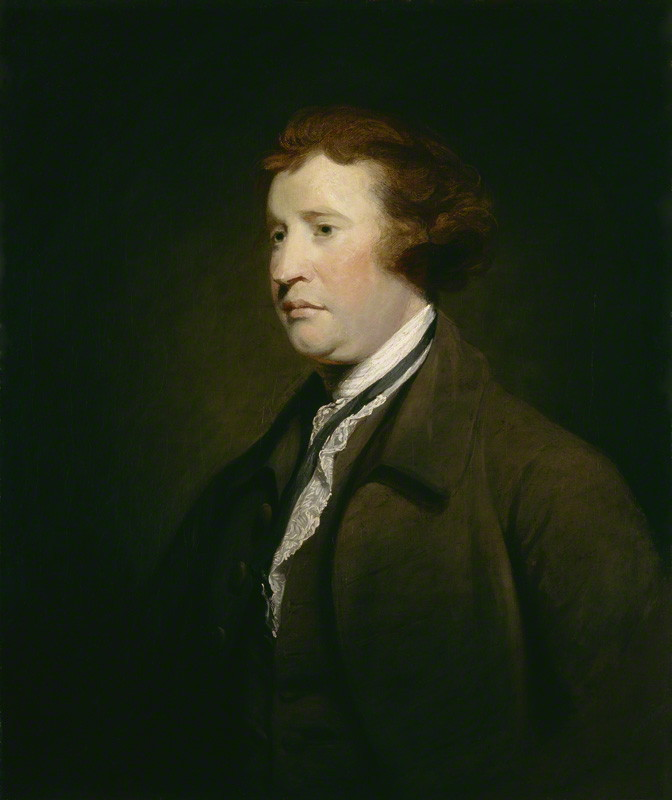
Edmund Burke, who praised Christianity's ability to strengthen British society

The religious thought of Edmund Burke includes published works by Edmund Burke and commentary on the same. Burke's religious thought was grounded in his belief that religion is the foundation of civil society. He sharply criticized deism and atheism and emphasized Christianity as a vehicle of social progress. Born in Ireland to a Protestant father and Catholic mother, Burke vigorously defended the Church of England, but also demonstrated sensitivity to Catholic concerns. He linked the conservation of a state religion with the preservation of citizens’ constitutional liberties and highlighted Christianity’s benefits not only to the believer’s soul but also to political arrangements.

== Early views ==
Burke's early essays "Religion of No Efficacy Considered as a State Engine" and "Religion" criticize contemporary efforts to reduce religion to a social and political instrument. "The Principle of Religion", Burke wrote, "is that God attends to our actions to reward and punish them". According to Burke, religion is ultimately something mysterious. It cannot exist without a personal God who places responsibilities on his creation. Burke claimed that "Moral Duties are included in Religion, and enforced by it". Burke's identification of religion as the source of morality is a reoccurring theme throughout his work.

== Social benefits of Christianity compared with deism ==
Ian Harris has observed that Burke "emphasized the social benefits of Christianity, rather than its truth". Burke considered Christianity the source of civilization and appealed to the Christian tradition for both eternal salvation and human welfare in this life. Although Burke "presumed the truth of Christianity", he did not try to explain its central doctrines. This was consistent with Burke’s overall approach to religion which was essentially political and philosophical rather than theological.

Burke's view that religion is the source of morality led him to view its absence as a perilous possibility. His first published book was A Vindication of Natural Society and satirizes the deism of his contemporary Viscount Bolingbroke. Drawing a distinction between revealed religions (those that believe in divinely inspired scripture) and natural religion or deism, Burke’s pseudo-Bolingbroke argues that revealed religion and civil society are similarly peppered with evils. If the remedy to revealed religion is natural religion, then the solution to civil society is natural society. By connecting natural religion with a primitive state of nature, Burke suggests the anti-social and degenerating implications of deism. Burke considered religion and morality "sublime principles" and called for "religious establishments [...] that many continually revive and support them". In this way, Burke envisioned Christianity as "contributing directly to the cohesion and improvement of society". Burke argued that "the consecration of the state by a state religious establishment" was necessary to secure the freedom of Englishmen. According to Burke, only a state-sanctioned religion could effectively instill citizens with a sense of awe and responsibility for their actions. A religion connected with the state was essential to making people realize that "they are to account for their conduct [...] to the one great Master, Author and Founder of society".

== Pluralism and toleration ==
Although Burke was a forceful defender of the Church of England, his view that a revealed religion was indispensable to a society’s progress was not limited to Christianity. In a speech before the House of Commons, Burke commended the "Hindoo Religion" for contributing to the "flourishing" of India. Similarly, he lauded Islamic governments for having the "double sanction of law and religion". Ian Harris cautions that these praises do not imply that Burke "entertained relativism about religious truth". Instead, Harris argues that these statements suggest Burke believed "that the religion which has become bound up with a society is the one that suits it". Burke also spoke in support of Catholics and dissenters from the Church of England. He argued that because the Church was "built up with the strong and stable matter of the gospel of liberty", it had nothing to fear from allowing other Christian groups to worship as they wished. Burke asserted that the Church of England’s "security of her own doctrines" made it possible to establish legal acceptance for Protestants and Catholics. "Toleration", Burke argued, "so far from being an attack upon Christianity, becomes the best and surest support that possibly can be given to it". However, Burke fiercely defended the Church establishment from attacks from within the Church of England. He publicly opposed the petition of several clergymen from the Church of England who asked to be relieved from subscription to the articles of the Act of Uniformity 1662. Burke advocated allowing English dissenters to practice Christianity the way they saw fit, but he briskly opposed efforts to subvert church authorities.

== Religion and the French Revolution ==
Burke’s criticisms of the French Revolution reiterated his longstanding view that revealed religion is an integral part of a civilized society. He sharply condemned the confiscation of Church property by the revolutionaries and claimed that their nonreligious views were "against, not only our reason, but our instincts". Burke predicted that if France rejected Catholicism, "some uncouth, pernicious, and degrading superstition might take the place of it".

Harris observes that Burke discerned clear religious features in the French Revolution. As the Revolution turned more radical and entered its international phrase, Burke thought of it "as no mere exercise in extending French rule, but instead as a crusade to destroy Christianity in Europe". "In a drunken delirium", Burke wrote, France risked "uncover[ing] our nakedness". The practice of a natural religion without revelation implied retrogression to "a savage and incoherent mode of life". Burke’s mature thought on religion reveals a remarkable consistency throughout his long career. For Burke, the French Revolution was a vivid example of the catastrophic consequences of deism which he had ridiculed in A Vindication of Natural Society more than thirty years before. The inadequacy of natural religion for both personal salvation and civil society are enduring themes of Burke’s thought. Burke believed that only revealed religions, especially Christianity, offer the possibility of social and political improvement. Linking morality and religion, Burke believed that the former could not exist without the latter. According to Burke, only institutional churches can effectively uphold these sublime principles and enable the fulfillment of man's obligations both to his neighbors and to God.

== Bibliography ==
- Burke, Edmund (1984). O'Brien, Conor Cruise (ed.). Reflections on the revolution in France : and on the proceedings in certain societies in London relative to that event (Reprint ed.). Harmondsworth, Middlesex: Penguin. ISBN 978-0-14043204-6.
- Somerset, H. V. F., ed. (1957). A note-book of Edmund Burke : Poems, characters, essays and other sketches in the hands of Edmund and William Burke now print. for the 1st time in their entirety (Reprint ed.). Cambridge: Univ. Press. ISBN 978-0-52124706-1.
- Insole, Christopher; Dwan, David, eds. (2012). The Cambridge companion to Edmund Burke. Cambridge: Cambridge University Press. ISBN 978-0-52118331-4.
