= Letters on a Regicide Peace =

Work by Edmund Burke

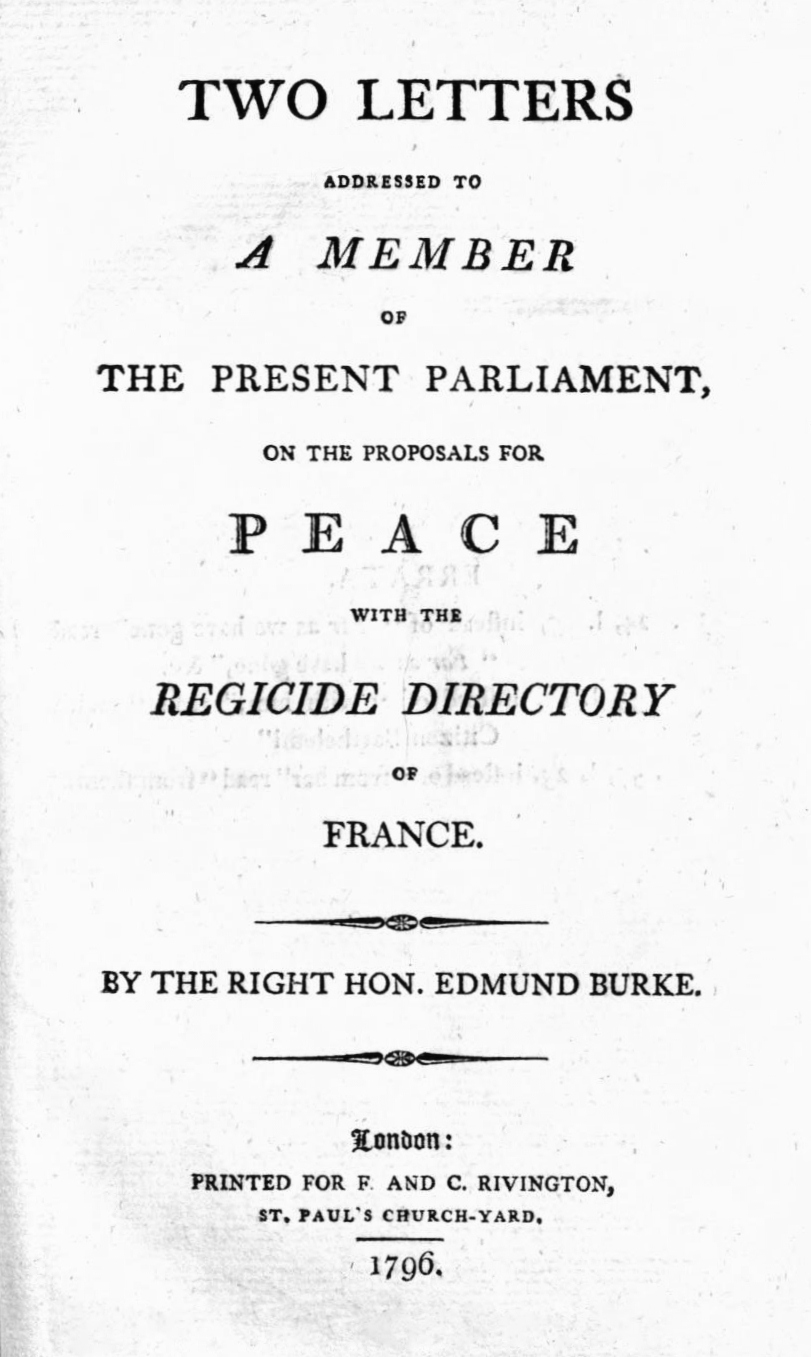
1796 title page

Letters on a Regicide Peace or Letters ... on the Proposals for Peace with the Regicide Directory of France were a series of four letters written by Edmund Burke during the 1790s in opposition to Prime Minister William Pitt's seeking of peace with the revolutionary French Directorate. It was completed and published in 1796.

Burke had already written the popular Reflections on the Revolution in France in late 1790, and by 1795 many of his gloomier predictions had come true.

== Background ==
By January 1796, Burke was finishing his Letter on a Regicide Peace, and parts of it were already printed. However, the work was delayed and it was published 20 October 1796, together with the second letter, as Two Letters on a Regicide Peace. An unauthorized version, printed by John Owen, a printer who had worked on the letters earlier in the year, appeared the day before Burke's edition was published. Burke's letters were popular, and the work went into 11 editions by the end of 1796. The last of the letters written, but the third in the series, was occasioned by the inability of Pitt's ministry to make peace with France; on 19 December 1796, Britain's envoy was expelled by the French. The letter included the subtitle "On the rupture of the negotiations, the terms of peace proposed, and the resources of the country for the continuance of the war".

The fourth letter, addressed to William Fitzwilliam, was written following Burke's reading of William Eden's Some Remarks on the Apparent Circumstances of the War in the Fourth Week of October 1795. When Pitt's government tried to negotiate peace with France, Burke stopped composing the letter and instead published what became the first two letters, called Two Letters on a Regicide Peace. Burke attempted to rewrite the letter to Fitzwilliam, but he did not finish before dying. The 1812 edition of his works did include a copy of the fourth letter that was pieced together from a manuscript copy by Burke, an uncorrected manuscript, and parts of the third letter's proof sheet.

== Letters ==
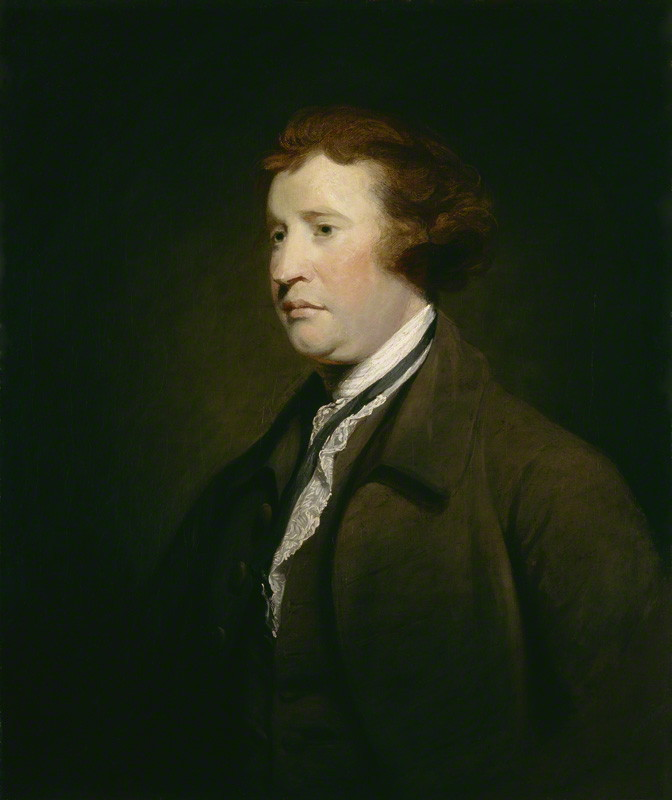
Edmund Burke, author of Letters on a Regicide Peace

Burke, in the third letter, attacks all of the British parties that desire peace with France, because France was intent on attacking Britain:

That day was, I fear, the fatal term of local patriotism. On that day, I fear, there was an end of that narrow scheme of relations called our country, with all its pride, its prejudices, and its partial affects. All the little quiet rivulets, that watered an humble, a contracted, but not an unfruitful field, are to be lost in the waste expanse, and boundless, barren ocean of the homicide philanthropy of France. It is no longer an object of terrour, the aggrandizement of a new power, which teaches as a professor that philanthropy in their chair; whilst it propagates by arms, and establishes by conquest, the comprehensive system of universal fraternity. In what light is all this viewed in a great assembly? The party which takes the lead there has no longer any apprehensions, except those that arise from not being admitted to the closest and most confidential connexions with the metropolis of that fraternity. That reigning party no longer touches on its favourite subject, the display of those horrours, that must attend the existence of a power, with such dispositions and principles, seated in the heart of Europe.

In the fourth letter, Burke personalises the events in France for a British audience:

Should we not obtest Heaven, and whatever justice is yet on Earth? Oppression makes wise men mad; but their distemper is still the madness of the wise, which is better than the sobriety of fools. Their cry is the voice of sacred misery, exalted not into wild raving, but into the sanctified phrensy of prophecy and inspiration - in that bitterness of soul, in that indignation of suffering virtue, in the exaltation of despair, would not persecuted English loyalty cry out, with an awful warning voice, and denounce the destruction that waits on Monarchs?

== Themes ==
Burke relies on a Juvenalian style to connect the events of the French Revolution to Britain. The language used compares wisdom with anger and connects feelings of indignation with the right manner of living. He, like Juvenal, calls upon his audience to react to the decaying world with a response based in both emotion and virtue. The language also connects to the epic tradition of both Milton and Homer by using images from their epics that call upon people to act, instead of allowing events to happen.

The letters also stigmatise Pitt's actions towards a peace with France as appeasing the French nation, which was the wrong way to act in Burke's view. Burke was confident that the war with France was waged not against the French people but merely the revolutionaries' ideologies. In the third letter, Burke mentions that the French maintained a fleet that could have sent troops to invade the Kingdom of Ireland. The French, at the same time that they stated that they wanted to continue negotiating peace were sending troops to invade. As such, Burke hints at a possible impeachment of Pitt for seeking peace with France. By chance, at the time the letters were being published, the French navy very nearly landed an army of 15,000 men at Bantry Bay in Ireland over Christmas 1796, known as "L'Expedition d'Irlande".

Burke's change from the letter to Fitzwilliam to the Letters on a Regicide Peace showed him turning to address what the government was doing in terms of peace. The views in his first two letters emphasized how Jacobin political beliefs would not allow for peace with France. Although the letter was supposed to deal with an event happening at the moment, the delay disrupted its timeliness. The published letters were able to convince The Gentleman's Magazine, which stated that such a peace would be impossible. Burke's stance on the French Revolution was similar to Fitzwilliam's, and the two advocated for their mutual position, which included a restoration of the French monarchy and the sense that a peace with France would be a humiliating defeat for Britain.

== Response ==
Although the work was popular, many people attacked the first two letters from both sides of the political spectrum. The government's paper the True Briton attacked Burke's language and claimed that his ideas about restoring the French monarchs would be impossible. The Morning Chronicle, an opposition paper, claimed that Burke was working with the government and that the letters were a government plot to gain opposition to a peace with France.

John Thelwall, a democrat and radical, was upset by his belief that Burke assumed that only a portion of the population, the informed individuals, should be understood as the public. Thelwall also opposed Burke's descriptions of British Jacobins and believed that Burke wanted to legalize their execution. James Mackintosh believed that Burke had a strong linguistic power and agreed that war could be necessary but not with France. To restore the French monarchy, to Mackintosh, would go against France's right as a nation and remove its independence. The only way for the opponents of France to do what is right is for them to be objective and balanced. William Roscoe, a Unitarian liberal, published in response Strictures on Mr Burke's Two Letters, in which he denounced Burke's arguments and defended the French Revolution.
