= Thoughts and Details on Scarcity =

1795 work by Edmund Burke

Thoughts and Details on Scarcity

Thoughts and Details on Scarcity, Originally Presented to the Right Hon. William Pitt, in the month of November, 1795 is a memorandum written by the Whig MP Edmund Burke to the Prime Minister of Great Britain William Pitt the Younger. It was published posthumously in 1800, along with an unfinished letter Burke was writing to the Secretary to the Board of Agriculture, Arthur Young.

In the memorandum Burke claimed that it was not the government's responsibility to provide for the necessities of life and that labour is a commodity which will rise and fall according to the laws of supply and demand. Whenever people fall on hard times it should be left to private charity rather than state aid to alleviate their suffering. Burke further claimed that the laws of commerce were the laws of nature and therefore the laws of God. He accepted that there were exceptions to these rules and he set out what he believed should be the limits:

That the State ought to confine itself to what regards the State, or the creatures of the State, namely, the exterior establishment of its religion; its magistracy; its revenue; its military force by sea and land; the corporations that owe their existence to its fiat; in a word, to every thing that is truly and properly public, to the public peace, to the public safety, to the public order, to the public prosperity.

Samuel Whitbread, a parliamentary ally of Burke's rival Charles James Fox, introduced a Bill on 9 December 1795 to enable magistrates to set minimum wages for agricultural labourers. Burke's letter to Young likely grew out of his opposition to this Bill.

This tract was often praised by the Radical and Liberal MP and anti-Corn Law activist, Richard Cobden.
