= An Appeal from the New to the Old Whigs =

Book by Edmund Burke

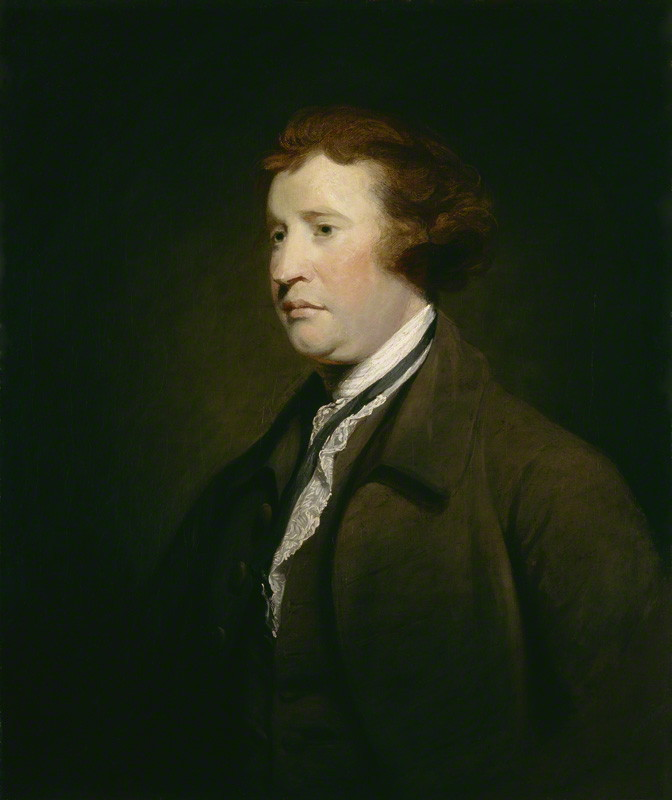
- Edmund Burke by Sir Joshua Reynolds.
- Author: Edmund Burke
- Language: English
- Publication date: 3 August 1791
- Publication place: United Kingdom
- Preceded by: Letter to a Member of the National Assembly
- Followed by: Letter to a Noble Lord

An Appeal from the New to the Old Whigs is a book written by the Irish Whig MP and philosopher, Edmund Burke, published on 3 August 1791.

== Background ==
Edmund Burke's position in the Whig party during the parliamentary session of 1790–91 was awkward. His Reflections on the Revolution in France, published in November 1790, had been generally well received by both the conservative Old Whigs and radical New Whigs. However, after the leading Whig Charles James Fox publicly denounced it, no fellow Whigs came out openly in Burke's defence. Burke was repeatedly called an apostate from Whiggism. 12 May 1791 issue of the Morning Chronicle proclaimed Burke's expulsion from the Whig party:

The great and firm body of the Whigs of England have decided on the dispute between Mr Fox and Mr Burke; and the former is declared to have maintained the pure doctrines by which they are bound together, and upon which they have invariably acted. The consequence is, that Mr Burke retires from parliament.

This and other attacks provoked Burke into writing a pamphlet to prove his consistency and his fidelity to Whig principles. Burke knew that his pamphlet would split the Whig party and possibly further isolate him from his colleagues but he was prepared to stand alone if necessary. However he also knew that some Whigs, such as his patron Lord Fitzwilliam, did not share Fox's pro-revolutionary views, and that if he could provoke Fitzwilliam to publicly repudiate Fox, this might lead other Whigs to do the same.

Burke was in dire need of money to pay off debts but in his letter of 5 June 1791 in response to Fitzwilliam's offer of money, he declined, referring to his "inward sense of honour". Burke went on to claim that "the difference between me and the party turns upon no trivial Objects...the world is threatened with great changes". His Reflections were intended "in the first instance, of service to the publick, in the second, to the party". Despite the initial favourable reception of the book, Burke "soon found, that things were much changed":

There were those in the party, who chose rather to injure themselves than to be so served. I found that great, and almost systematick pains were taken to discredit that work in the Party, to get its principles disclaimed; and of course (for medium there is none) to get the Principles of Paine, Priestley, Price, Rouse, Mackintosh, Christie &ca &ca &ca magnified and extolled, and in a sort of obscure and undefined manner to be adopted as the Creed of the party. The supper at Brooke's was a sort of Academy for these Doctrines. Individuals, little courted before, were separately talked over, and, as it were, canvassed.

Burke wanted to portray the whole Whig party as a pro-revolutionary party to provoke the anti-Jacobin element in the Whig party to come out publicly against the French Revolution and its British supporters. He wrote to his son on 5 August:

As to the party, in which I once acted, and to which I am still inwardly tied by great affection, you know that the whole of those who think with the French Revolution (if in reality they think at all seriously with it) do not exceed half a Score in both Houses. If two or three, who, I think doubtful, were added, you see the difference would not be very material. They who want to move have nothing to fear from this Nation or from any part of it. Those who wish them well are strong. Their illwishers are weak. It may be asked, why I represent the whole party as tolerating, and by a toleration countenancing, those proceedings. It is to get the better of their inactivity, and to stimulate them to a publick declaration of, what every one of their acquaintance privately knows, to be as much their Sentiments as they are yours or mine.

== Contents ==
Burke wrote in the third person, and anonymously, though he made no secret that he was the author. The book bearing no author was a deliberate device which, together with being entitled an "appeal", was intended to have the effect of making the work look like an objective and impartial judgement between Burke and his opponents, rather than Burke presenting his own case. Unlike in the Reflections, Burke's style is less flowery, less emotive and more plain speaking. He included long extracts from The Tryal of Dr. Henry Sacheverell (1710) and Paine's Rights of Man.

== Reception ==
The book was published on 3 August, the first edition of 2,000 copies was nearly all sold by 10 August, when a second edition was in the press (and for which Burke made a few minor revisions). The third edition was published on 3 September and Burke made significant changes to the text. His friend French Laurence suggested he rearrange it, which Burke duly did. He also added to his claim that the British constitution had a natural tendency to compromise, unlike the new French constitution. The total sale of the book was at least 5,000.

Although Whig grandees like Fitzwilliam and the Duke of Portland privately agreed with Burke's Appeal, they wished he had used more moderate language and were unwilling to break with Fox at this time. They did not yet believe he held anti-constitutional views and the French Revolution had not yet produced the atrocities that turned British public opinion against it.

On 18 September Fitzwilliam wrote to Burke:

I thank you heartily for the pamphlet, and for the authorities you give me for the doctrines I have sworn by, long and long since: I know not how long, they have been my creed: I believe, before even my happiness in your acquaintance and friendship, tho' they have certainly been strengthen'd and confirm'd by your conversation and instruction—in support of these principles I trust I shall ever act, and I shall continue to attempt their general propagation;—whether by the best means, is matter of speculation: but by the best, according to my judgement—nothing can make me a disciple of Paine and Priestley, nor any thing induce me to proclaim, that I am not so, but in the mode I myself think the best to resist their mischief—private conversation and private insinuation may best suite the extent of my abilities, the turn of my temper, and the nature of my character—and if the best proof of wisdom is to accommodate modes to means: it is the only way of producing effect in ordinary hands—when I lament (, and that I do so, you will no doubt) certain declarations, I do no more than every man of our party (excepting perhaps an envious, mischievous individual or so)—general esteem, the highest opinion of abilities, honor and integrity, render this sentiment general—all that can be said is—alas!—no man feels it more than I do—I have no sentiment but regret for every thing that I have seen happen—adieu, never hesitate one instant to doubt my affection esteem and admiration.

Therefore Burke's aim for Fitzwilliam to publicly break with Fox failed. The Duke of Portland wrote to Laurence that "there is so much excellent & admirable matter in it, so much that might have been of the most essential publick Service" but the book was made "worse than useless by passages which I am sure he can not have a friend who does not disapprove & deplore". Another leading Whig peer, Lord Loughborough, thought the publication of the book would be a "Mischief" but believed Burke's doctrines "fundamentally right". Francis Basset, a backbench Whig MP, wrote to Burke: "...though for reasons which I will not now detail I did not then deliver my sentiments, I most perfectly differ from Mr Fox & from the great Body of opposition on the French Revolution".

Burke wrote to the Bishop of Salisbury on 31 July, noting that as the King had strongly commended his Reflections "I might be wanting to myself, if I did not offer, as the only mark in my power to give my Gratitude and humble Duty a second publication which aims to reinforce the principle which has been so graciously received in the first". He therefore asked the bishop to "lay a copy of it at his Majesties feet": "I think at least that I have shewn, beyond a Dispute, that my Sentiments are those of the rational Whiggs who settled the succession, upon the antient principles of the constitution, in the House of Hannover". A few days later the bishop wrote to Burke to report that the King had read the book "with great Satisfaction". The King also praised Burke at a levee on 17 August: "Nothing could be more gracious than my reception. He told me that he did not think that any thing could be added to what I had first written. But he saw he was mistaken; that there was very much added, and new and important; and what was most material what could not be answered".

Lord Hawkesbury also praised the book. During the 1770s Burke suspected Hawkesbury, a significant "king's friend", of being the prime mover of "secret influence". He wrote to Burke on 12 August, saying he had "perused...with the greatest Satisfaction and Pleasure, and...thinks it fortunate for this Country, and indeed for every other Country, that such Talents are exerted to stem the Folly and Madness, which at present prevail almost universally, with respect to the Nature of civil Society, founded on the most perfect Ignorance of the nature of Man, and of those Obligations on which all Government is founded, and by which alone it can be supported. Perhaps uncomfortable with praise from such quarters, instead of replying directly Burke asked the Duke of Dorset to convey his thanks for his letter.

Charles Burney wrote to Frances Burney, claiming that it as "a most admirable book—the best & most useful on political subjects that I have ever seen" but believed the differences in the Whig party between Burke and Fox should not be publicly aired. He said some of "our friends" thought it "a wicked book—in which his friends, in a fit of patriotism, have been basely sacrificed". Others, however, "swear by it, as congenial to their principles". Henry Dundas wrote to Burke on 12 August: "My Praise can add nothing to your literary fame, and therefore I can offer you nothing but my hearty acknowledgements for the Satisfaction you have afforded me in the perusal of an illuminated delineation of the Principles of Government and of the British Constitution".

Burke wrote of its reception: "Not one word from one of our party. They are secretly galled. They agree with me to a tittle—but they dare not speak out for fear of hurting Fox. As to me they leave me to myself. They see that I can do myself justice".

=== Pamphlet replies ===
The Appeal provoked five pamphlet replies, all of whose authors had previously written against Burke's Reflections. In A Letter from Major Scott to the Right Honourable Edmund Burke, Scott quoted Burke's speeches and books to claim he was being politically inconsistent. Sir Brooke Boothby (Observations on the 'Appeal from the New Whigs' and on Mr Paine's 'Rights of Man') claimed that the major threat was not from the French Revolution but from the power of the Crown. He wanted a middle way between Burke and Paine.

Other replies were William Belsham, Examination of 'An Appeal to the New Whigs', George Rous' A Letter to the Right Honourable Edmund Burke and Charles Pigott, Strictures on the New Political Tenets of the Rt. Hon. Edmund Burke.

=== Press ===
The press reaction to the book was mixed. The Gentleman's Magazine said the book was "so excellent a detection of the principles of modern Whiggism, written with so much temper, cool argument, and dispassionate reflection". The Analytical Review, on the other hand, apologised to its readers for not writing an "analysis" of "this very desultory performance" which was filled with "the paradoxes with which this fanciful writer amuses his imagination".
