= A Philosophical Enquiry into the Origin of Our Ideas of the Sublime and Beautiful =

1757 treatise on aesthetics by Edmund Burke

On the Sublime and Beautiful
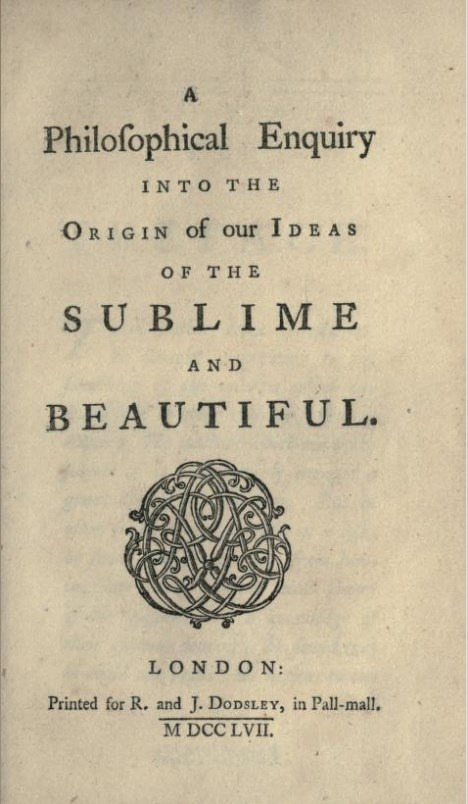
- A philosophical enquiry into the origin of our ideas of the sublime and beautiful.
- Author: Edmund Burke
- Original title: A Philosophical Enquiry into the Origin of Our Ideas of the Sublime and Beautiful
- Publication date: 1757, 2nd edition 1759
- Publication place: Great Britain
- Text: On the Sublime and Beautiful at Wikisource

A Philosophical Enquiry into the Origin of Our Ideas of the Sublime and Beautiful is a 1757 treatise (2nd edition 1759) on aesthetics written by the Anglo-Irish politician Edmund Burke. It was the first complete philosophical exposition for separating the beautiful and the sublime into their own respective rational categories. It attracted the attention of prominent thinkers such as Denis Diderot and Immanuel Kant.

== Summary ==
According to Burke, the Beautiful is that which is well-formed and aesthetically pleasing, whereas the Sublime is that which has the power to compel and destroy us. The preference for the Sublime over the Beautiful was to mark the transition from the Neoclassical to the Romantic era.

The work includes criticism of the idea that beauty is dependent on proportion: "Beauty hath usually been said to consist in certain proportions of parts. On considering the matter, I have great reason to doubt, whether beauty be at all an idea belonging to proportion."

The origins of our ideas of the beautiful and the sublime, for Burke, can be understood by means of their causal structures. According to Aristotelian physics and metaphysics, causation can be divided into formal, material, efficient and final causes. The formal cause of beauty is the passion of love; the material cause concerns aspects of certain objects such as smallness, smoothness, delicacy, etc.; the efficient cause is the calming of our nerves; the final cause is God's providence. What is most peculiar and original to Burke's view of beauty is that it cannot be understood by the traditional bases of beauty: proportion, fitness, or perfection. The sublime also has a causal structure that is unlike that of beauty. Its formal cause is thus the passion of fear (especially the fear of death); the material cause is equally aspects of certain objects such as vastness, infinity, magnificence, etc.; its efficient cause is the tension of our nerves; the final cause is God having created and battled Satan, as expressed in John Milton's great epic Paradise Lost.

== Kant's comments ==
Immanuel Kant critiqued Burke for not understanding the causes of the mental effects that occur in the experience of the beautiful or the sublime. According to Kant, Burke merely gathered data so that some future thinker could explain them.

To make psychological observations, as Burke did in his treatise on the beautiful and the sublime, thus to assemble material for the systematic connection of empirical rules in the future without aiming to understand them, is probably the sole true duty of empirical psychology, which can hardly even aspire to rank as a philosophical science.

— Immanuel Kant, First Introduction to the Critique of Judgment, X.

== See also ==
- A Vindication of Natural Society
