= A Vindication of Natural Society =

1756 work by Edmund Burke

- Author: Edmund Burke
- Language: English
- Subject: Philosophical anarchism
- Genre: Political satire
- Publisher: M. Cooper
- Publication date: 1756
- Publication place: Great Britain
- ISBN: 0-86597-009-2
- OCLC: 1102756444
- Followed by: On the Sublime and Beautiful
- Text: A Vindication of Natural Society at Wikisource

A Vindication of Natural Society: or, a View of the Miseries and Evils arising to Mankind from every Species of Artificial Society is a work by the Anglo-Irish politician Edmund Burke, published in 1756. Although the Vindication is a satire aimed at the deism of Lord Bolingbroke, Burke confronted Bolingbroke not in the sphere of religion but in that of civil society and government, countering that his arguments against revealed religion could apply to all institutions. So close to Bolingbroke's style was the work that Burke's ironic intention was missed by some readers, leading Burke in his preface to the second edition (1757) to make plain that it was a satire; this is the consensus view among most Burkean scholars and followers.

The Vindication was recognized as satire by William Godwin, often regarded as the first modern proponent of philosophical anarchism, who supported part of Burke's arguments critical of the existing political institutions despite the irony inherent in its satire. Conversely, some modern right-wing libertarian commentators, such as Murray Rothbard and Joseph Sobran, interpreted Burke's satire as a serious philosophical anarchist argument against the state.

== Satire ==
Historians and Burke's biographers, scholars, and followers believe the Vindication was intended as satire; some political commentators disagree. For example, American anarcho-capitalist economist and political theorist Murray Rothbard described the work as "perhaps the first modern expression of rationalistic and individualistic anarchism", and argued that Burke wrote the Vindication in earnest but later wished to disavow it for political reasons, (Note: For Rothbard's full arguments for why the Vindication was a serious work by Burke, see: Rothbard 1958, pp. 117–118: "There are many internal indications that this is a sober work by Burke, and not a satire. In the first place, there is his treatment of reason. One of Burke's most characteristic views in his later years, and one that particularly endears him to the New Conservatives, is his distrust of reason. In particular the rationalists who wish to plan the lives of people in the way an engineer builds a machine, are contrasted with conservatives who rely on spontaneous and unplanned change. It would seem, therefore, that Burke's reliance on reason in the Vindication is simply a satire on these rationalist views. But this is not the case at all. In upholding reason as the bulwark of his extreme libertarian views, Burke also attacks those rationalists who wish to plan and tyrannize over society. But he attacks them not because they are rationalists, but precisely because they are false to reason. They are not rationalist enough to realize the rationality of liberty. ... Secondly, if Burke had meant to impugn Bolingbroke's Deist views, he would have denounced 'artificial religion' equally or more than he denounces government. But on the contrary, Burke explicitily states that government is a far greater evil. Another piece of evidence for the seriousness of the Vindication is its bitter denunciation of lawyers and legal procedures. We know that Burke, in this period, was an unhappy law student, fed up with law and eagerly turning to literature and literary companions. His bitter passages on Law in the Vindication fit perfectly with what we know of his feelings in this period. But if these passages are faithful to Burke's genuine opinions, why not the rest of the work as well? Historians have stressed that the Vindication was written in imitation of the style of the recently dead Bolingbroke, and have taken this as proof of its satiric bent. Yet these same biographers of Burke admit that, in his later writings, he continued to write in a similar style! Is it, in fact, surprising that young Burke should try to imitate the style of the man universally acknowledged as the greatest stylist and orator of his day? Burke's elaborate efforts to shield his identity from the public, to give the impression that this was a posthumous work of Bolingbroke's, hint at a different explanation. This is his realization that the kind of views expressed in the Vindication would be bitterly reviled and denounced. ... If the work were [sic] really a satire, why only proclaim it as such when a rising political career was at stake? Why not announce it shortly after publication? And if the Burke of Vindication was in deadly earnest, did he really change his earlier views, or did this great advocate of prudence bow prudently to the public temper?"; For John C. Weston Jr.'s response to Rothbard's arguments, see: Weston 1958, p. 441: "Mr. Rothbard presents a number of specific reasons for believing the Vindication a 'sober' work, which perhaps should be answered. First, in connection with Burke's 'treatment of reason,' one cannot deny the irony of his treatment merely by asserting the literal reading. Second, that Burke 'did not impugn Bolingbroke's Deist views' is not true and if it were is not an indication that he approved of them; Burke in this essay was attacking the suppositions of Deism by ridiculing its methods and attitudes as applied to politics. Third, that Burke-as-Bolingbroke here denounces what we know Burke himself disliked, lawyers and legal procedures, does not mean that the piece is sober; a part of a general satire can represent the author's real belief used to satirize something else. Fourth, there is really no proof that Burke presented his own views as Bolingbroke's to protect himself from the charge of radicalism: many contemporaries, as the above review shows, know who wrote the piece anyway, and although there are indications of a hoax there is no indication of 'elaborate efforts to shield his identity.' That the whole piece has the tone of 'a man who fears the consequences of publishing his views' is a part of the very ingenious, perhaps overly-subtle, satire: Bolingbroke himself delayed publication of nearly all his pieces until after his death; Burke here, like his friend Dr. Johnson elsewhere, is attacking his furtive, dishonest, and stealthy manner.") while American paleoconservative writer Joseph Sobran stated that Burke's anti-statist argument was too persuasive to be a joke.

Rothbard's argument was based on a misunderstanding. He believed it took nine years (until 1765) for Burke to divulge that he was the author of the work, and only claimed it to be a satire to save his then spawning political career. In reality, Burke revealed both his authorship and claims the book as a satire in the preface to its second edition published in 1757, long before he would embark upon a political career.

British political philosopher William Godwin, often considered the first modern proponent of anarchism, (Note: See Philp, Mark (20 May 2006). "William Godwin". In Zalta, Edward N. (ed.). Stanford Encyclopedia of Philosophy. ISSN 1095-5054. OCLC 429049174. Others consider Pierre-Joseph Proudhon the first modern proponent of anarchism (he is also called "the father of anarchism"), being the first individual to call himself an anarchist and among the first to mean anarchy in a positive sense to mean a free society without government. In contrast to Burke's conservative values (he is seen as "the Father of New Conservatism") and scepticism toward radical change, Godwin's own principles advocated for a stateless society, emphasizing individual liberty, a more equitable distribution of resources and collective well-being, and the potential for a self-governing humanity. Both Kropotkin 1911 (Encyclopædia Britannica Eleventh Edition) and Rothbard 1958 describe Godwin as an anarchist communist. For an analysis of the politics of Burke and Godwin, particularly within the context of the French Revolution, see also Graham, Kenneth W. (1989). "William Godwin vs. Edmund Burke: Französische Revolution und das politische Denken in England". Band 2 (in German). Berlin: De Gruyter. pp. 493–501. doi:10.1515/9783112707258-010. ISBN 978-3-11-270725-8.) appreciated its critique of political institutions but recognized the satire, and observed that the intent of Burke was to show that the existing political institutions, for all their flaws, were still preferable to anarchy. Passages that included Jonathan Swift-style irony, where Burke acted as though he was Bolingbroke and those who supported him in many ways in the Vindication, and as a theoretical realization of the danger such controversial opinions may have upon a career are the following:

"In such a Discussion, far am I from proposing in the least to reflect on our most wise Form of Government; no more than I would in the freer Parts of my philosophical Writings, mean to object to the Piety, Truth, and Perfection of our most excellent Church. [...] These and many more Points I am far from spreading to their full Extent. You are sensible that I do not put forth half my Strength; and you cannot be at a loss for the Eeason. A Man is allowed sufficient Freedom of Thought, provided he knows how to chuse his Subject properly. You may criticise freely upon the Chinese Constitution, and observe with as much Severity as you please upon the Absurd Tricks, or destructive Bigotry of the Bonzees. But the Scene is changed as you come homeward, and Atheism or Treason may be the Names given in Britain, to what would be Reason and Truth if asserted of China."

== Content ==
The preface presents the occasion of the essay as a riposte to the philosophy of Henry St John, 1st Viscount Bolingbroke (died 1751), whose Collected Works and Letters had been published by David Mallet in 5 volumes in 1754. A new preface was written by Burke after his authorship was discovered, and after a significant number of his contemporaries who read his work had not caught the irony. In this apologetic preface, he wrote that Vindication was inspired by "seeing every Mode of Religion attacked in a lively Manner, and the Foundation of every Virtue, and of all Government, sapped with great Art and much Ingenuity" in Lord Bolingbroke's collected works. About his design, Burke wrote:

"The Design was, to shew that, without the Exertion of any considerable Forces, the same Engines which were employed for the Destruction of Religion, might be employed with equal Success for the Subversion of Government; and that specious Arguments might be used against those Things which they, who doubt of every thing else, will never permit to be questioned."

Burke contrasts natural society with political society, beginning with a distrust of the mind, which "every day invents some new artificial Rule to guide that Nature which if left to itself were the best and surest Guide". He proposes to set out to identify those "unalterable Relations which Providence has ordained that every thing should bear to every other. These Relations, which are Truth itself, the Foundation of Virtue, and consequently, the only Measures of Happiness, should be likewise the only Measures by which we should direct our Reasoning." Burke's attack on the rationalists of his day is not because they are rationalists but because they engage in artificial rather than natural reason. In the spirit of the Age of Enlightenment, Burke expresses every confidence in the cumulative progress of the human condition. He writes:

"The Fabrick of Superstition has in this our Age and Nation received much ruder Shocks than it had ever felt before; and through the Chinks and Breaches of our Prison, we see such Glimmerings of Light, and feel such refreshing Airs of Liberty, as daily raise our Ardor for more. The Miseries derived to Mankind from Superstition, under the Name of Religion, and of ecclesiastical Tyranny under the Name of Church Government, have been clearly and usefully exposed."

In a swift survey of history, Burke finds nothing but "Tumults, Rebellions, Massacres, Assassinations, Proscriptions, and a Series of Horror", and remarks that "All Empires have been cemented in Blood" as the casualties mount in the millions, with cruelties perfected by technology. Contrasted with natural liberty and natural religion, Burke sets the Aristotelian general forms of government, which he describes with the same emphatic detail as used in the Satires of Juvenal: starting from despotism, the simplest and most universal, where "unbounded Power proceeds Step by Step, until it has eradicated every laudable Principle"; then republics, which "have many Things in the Spirit of absolute Monarchy, but none more than this; a shining Merit is ever hated or suspected in a popular Assembly, as well as in a Court"; followed by aristocracy, which is scarcely better, as "a Genoese, or a Venetian Republick, is a concealed Despotism"; and finally giddy democracy, where the common people are "intoxicated with the Flatteries of their Orators". (Note: According to Rothbard 1958, p. 116, Burke "emphatically denounces any and all government, and not just specific forms of government. Citing Edmund Burke, Works (London, 1900), I, pp. 46, 32–33: "The Several species of government vie with each other in the absurdity of their constitutions, and the oppression which they make their subjects endure. Take them under what form you please, they are in effect but a despotism ... Parties in religion and politics make sufficient discoveries concerning each other, to give a sober man proper caution against them all. The monarchist, and aristocratical, and popular partisans have been jointly laying their axes to the root of all government, and have in their turns proved each other absurd and inconvenient. In vain you tell me that artificial governing thing itself is the abuse." According to Rothbard 1958, p. 117, Burke "explicitily states that government is a far greater evil", citing Edmund Burke, Works (London, 1900), I, pp. 46–47. According to Weston 1958, pp. 438–439: "In his conclusion (62–66) [Burke] insists on the connection between artificial religion and artificial society, asserts that the latter is the worse and maintains that to do away with the one necessities doing away with the other and, ironically and conversely, that if the one is kept the other must be kept also. He ends the piece by confessing that he has not always been able to view objects, as he is now able, in the 'cold light of reason' but that with age has come a falling off of passions.") Despite being a law student, Burke also denounced lawyers and legal procedures.

Burke then turns his critical eye upon the mixed government, which combines monarchy, aristocracy, and a tempered democracy, the form of politics that this essay's British readers would immediately identify as their own (Westminster system). He ends with: "You may criticise freely upon the Chinese Constitution, and observe with as much Severity as you please upon the Absurd Tricks, or destructive Bigotry of the Bonzees. But the Scene is changed as you come homeward, and Atheism or Treason may be the Names given in Britain, to what would be Reason and Truth if asserted of China."

== See also ==
- Noble savage

== Bibliography ==
=== Primary sources ===
- Burke, Edmund (1982) [1756]. Pagano, Frank N. (ed.). A Vindication of Natural Society: A View of the Miseries and Evils Arising to Mankind. Indianapolis: Liberty Fund. ISBN 978-0-86597-009-0 – via Google Books.
- Burke, Edmund (1998) [1757]. A Philosophical Enquiry into the Sublime and Beautiful (e-book ed.). London: Penguin UK. ISBN 978-0-14-190811-3 – via Google Books.
- Burke, Edmund (1999). Kramnick, Isaac (ed.). The Portable Edmund Burke (e-book ed.). London: Penguin. ISBN 978-1-101-12740-7 – via Google Books.

=== Secondary sources ===
- Crowe, Ian (2012). "Unraveling the Threads in Burke's 'Vindication of Natural Society'". In Crowe, Ian (ed.). Patriotism and Public Spirit: Edmund Burke and the Role of the Critic in Mid-Eighteenth-Century Britain. Redwood City, California: Stanford University Press. pp. 73–107. ISBN 978-0-8047-8127-5 – via Google Books and Oxford Academic.
- Godwin, William (1842). Enquiry Concerning Political Justice: And Its Influence on Morals and Happiness. J. Watson – via Google Books.
- Peters, Anne; Somos, Mark, eds. (2021). The State of Nature: Histories of an Idea (e-book ed.). Leiden: Brill. ISBN 978-90-04-49962-1 – via Google Books.
- Rothbard, Murray (January 1958). "A Note on Burke's Vindication of Natural Society". Journal of the History of Ideas. 19 (1): 114–118. doi:10.2307/2707957. ISSN 0022-5037. JSTOR 2707957.
- Sobran, Joseph (24 January 2002). "Anarchism, Reason, and History". Sobran's.
- Smith, George H. (21 May 2014). "Edmund Burke, Intellectuals, and the French Revolution, Part 2". Libertarianism.org.
- Weston, John C. (1958). "The Ironic Purpose of Burke's Vindication Vindicated". Journal of the History of Ideas. 19 (3): 435–441. doi:10.2307/2708048. ISSN 0022-5037. JSTOR 2708048.
