= Mayor of Bristol =

Mayors and Lord Mayors of Bristol, England

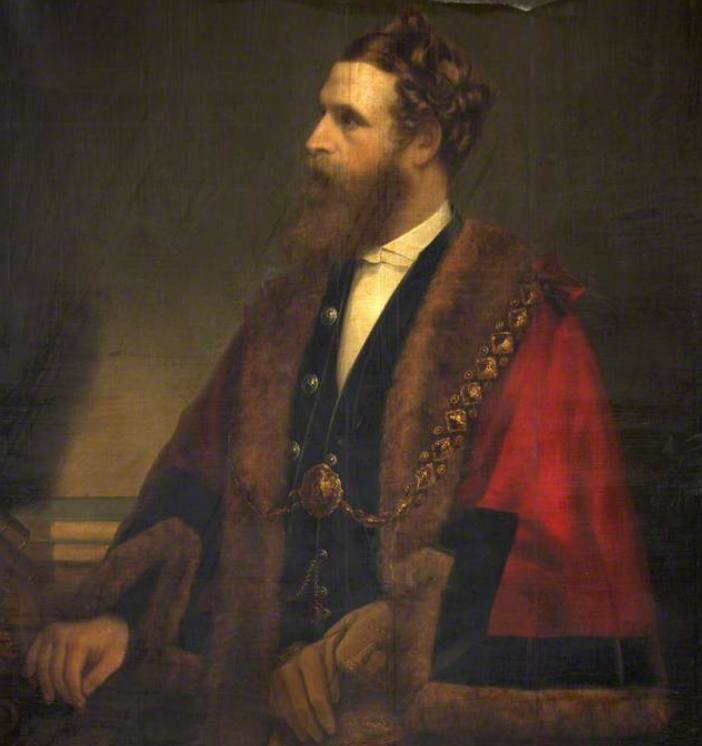
William Killigrew Wait, who served as Mayor of Bristol in 1869.

The Mayor of Bristol has existed since the 13th century. Bristol's first mayor was probably Roger Cordewainer, a confident of King John, and likely appointed by him in 1216. Cordwainer was followed by Adam Le Page, who was likely the first mayor chosen by the town itself. Despite being accepted as the leader of the town, the mayor was not formally recognised in royal charters till 1373 which stipulated that ‘the said mayor and sheriff and 40 men would raise and disburse money for the necessities and profits of the said town’.

The position of Lord Mayor of Bristol was conferred on the city in June 1899 (effective 15 November 1899) as part of the Queen's Birthday Honours and was confirmed by letters patent dated 1 April 1974. The Lord Mayor is the Chairperson of the City Council and has the casting vote. As Bristol's first citizen, they are the non-political, ceremonial head of the city. The Lord Mayor of Bristol is styled The Right Honourable, although without official sanction, rather than the more normal Right Worshipful enjoyed by most other Lord Mayors. The names of all Mayors and Lord Mayors of Bristol since 1216 are cut into the stone walls of the Conference Hall of Bristol City Hall.

From 2012 to 2024, a separate directly elected Mayor of Bristol role existed who, along with the 70 members of Bristol City Council, was responsible for the strategic government of Bristol. During this period Bristol had two mayors simultaneously: the directly elected Mayor with a political role, and the ceremonial Lord Mayor. The directly elected Mayor was abolished in 2024.

The Lord Mayor is elected each May by city councillors and taking office on 29 September for a one-year period. The Lord Mayor chairs Council meetings and performs ceremonial functions in the city.

== Mayors of Bristol: 1216–1899 ==
Mayors of Bristol included the following:

=== 1200s ===
- 1216 Roger Cordewainer
- 1217 Adam Le Page
- 1218 Martin Undiryate
- 1219 John at Hulle
- 1220 Robert Holburst
- 1221 Roger de Stanes
- 1222 Walter Mombray
- 1223 John de Berdewyke
- 1224 James de Roweborowe
- 1225 Walter de Wyntone
- 1226 Hugh de Fayreforde
- 1227 John de Mersshefielde
- 1228 Henry Le Long
- 1229 Nicholas Heyhome
- 1230 John Bruselaunce
- 1231 Henry de Berewyke
- 1232 Elyas Spryngham
- 1233 Walter Le Fraunceis
- 1234 Richard Aylard
- 1235 Jordan Browne
- 1236 James Le Warre
- 1237 Richard Horston
- 1238 Philip de Powket
- 1239 Richard Forstall
- 1240 Richard Aylard
- 1241 Thomas de Weston
- 1242 Robert Le Bele
- 1243 William Clerk
- 1244 William Spakstone
- 1245 Ralph Monjoy
- 1246 Elyas de Axbrige
- 1247 Reginald de Penes
- 1248 Geoffrey le White
- 1249 John Adryan
- 1250 Roger de Bury
- 1251 Elyas Long
- 1252 Thomas Le Rous
- 1253 Reynold de Wight
- 1254 Henry Adryan
- 1255 Adam de Berkham
- 1256 Robert de Kylmaynan
- 1257 Roger de Berkham
- 1258 Roger de Stokes
- 1259 Clement de Romeney
- 1260 William de Gloucestre
- 1261 John de Lyme
- 1262 Robert de Kylmaynan
- 1263 Adam de Berkham
- 1264 Thomas Le Rous
- 1265 Henry Adryan
- 1266 Stephen Ormestone
- 1267 Thomas Selby
- 1268 Simon Clerk
- 1269 Robert Mauncell
- 1270 Roger Fissher
- 1271 Ralph Paldene
- 1272 John Wissy
- 1273 Richard de Wellis
- 1274 Peter de Keynesham
- 1275 Thomas de Hamelesden
- 1276 Gerard Le Fraunces
- 1277 Simon de Bardeney
- 1278 John Lydewarde
- 1279 Roger Le Tavyrnere
- 1280 Peter de Romeney
- 1281 William Beauflure
- 1282 Nicholas Horncastell
- 1283 Thomas Cokere
- 1284 Peter de Romeney
- 1285 Richard Mangottesfielde
- 1286 Richard Mangottesfielde
- 1287 John Le Warre
- 1288 Roger de Graftone
- 1289 Richard Le Draper
- 1290 Richard Mangottesfielde
- 1291 Roger Turcle
- 1292 Thomas de Tilley
- 1293 Walter Le Fraunces
- 1294 Simon de Burton
- 1295 Simon de Burton
- 1296 Simon de Burton
- 1297 William Randalf
- 1298 John Snowe
- 1299 Richard de Mangottesfield

=== 1300s ===
- 1300 Roger Turtle
- 1301 Thomas de Tiley
- 1302 Walter Adrian
- 1303 Thomas le Grave
- 1304 Simon de Bourton
- 1305 Simon de Bourton
- 1306 William Randolph
- 1307 John Snow
- 1308 John le Taverner
- 1309 John le Taverner
- 1310 William Randolph
- 1311 J. Danfeller
- 1312 William Hore
- 1313 John le Taverner
- 1314 Raynald de Paines
- 1315 William Randolph
- 1316 Robert Passons
- 1317 Richard de Tilly
- 1318 Roger Terrill
- 1319 William de Axe
- 1320 Richard de Tilly
- 1321 Richard de Tilly
- 1322 Roger Terrill
- 1323 William de Axe
- 1324 John de Romney
- 1325 John de Romney
- 1326 Roger Turtle
- 1327 Hugh de Langbridge
- 1328 John Francis
- 1329 John de Axbridge
- 1330 Roger Turtle
- 1331 Everard le Frances
- 1332 Roger Turtle
- 1333 Roger Turtle
- 1334 Hugh de Langbridge
- 1335 Roger Turtle
- 1336 Everard le Frances
- 1337 Stephen le Spicer
- 1338 Stephen le Spicer
- 1339 Everard le Frances
- 1340 Roger Turtle
- 1341 Roger Turtle
- 1342 Robert Wrington
- 1343 Stephen le Spicer
- 1344 Stephen le Spicer
- 1345 Robert Gwyen
- 1346 Robert Gwyen
- 1347 Robert Wrington
- 1348 John le Spicer
- 1349 Robert Gwyen
- 1350 John Wickham
- 1351 John le Spicer
- 1352 John de Cobbinton
- 1353 Richard le Spycer
- 1354 Richard le Spycer
- 1355 Thomas Babcary
- 1356 Reynald le French
- 1357 Walter Frampton
- 1358 Reynald le French
- 1359 Thomas Babcary
- 1360 Robert Chedre
- 1361 Richard Brandon
- 1362 Robert Chedre
- 1363 Walter Derby
- 1364 John Stoke
- 1365 Walter Frampton
- 1366 John Stoke
- 1367 Walter Derby
- 1368 John Bathe
- 1369 Elias Spelly
- 1370 John Bathe
- 1371 Ricard Spycer
- 1372 Wm. Canynges
- 1373 Wm. Canynges
- 1374 Walter Frampton
- 1375 Wm. Canynges
- 1376 Walter Derby
- 1377 Tho. Beaupenny
- 1378 Elias Spelly
- 1379 John Stoke
- 1380 Walter Derby
- 1381 Wm. Canynges
- 1382 Elias Spelly
- 1383 Tho. Beaupenny
- 1384 Walter Derby
- 1385 Wm. Canynges
- 1386 Thomas Knappe
- 1387 Wm. Somervell
- 1388 John Vyell
- 1389 Wm. Canynges
- 1390 Elias Spelly
- 1391 Thomas Knappe
- 1392 John Canynges
- 1393 John Somervell
- 1394 Wm. Froome
- 1395 John Barstable
- 1396 Thomas Knappe
- 1397 John Banbury
- 1398 John Canynges
- 1399 Thomas Knappe

=== 1400s ===
- 1400 Thomas Knappe
- 1401 William Frome
- 1402 John Barnstable
- 1403 John Stephens
- 1404 Thomas Knappe
- 1405 Robert Dudbroke
- 1406 John Barnstable
- 1407 John Droys
- 1408 Thomas Blount
- 1409 John Fisher
- 1410 John Droys
- 1411 Thomas Yonge, MP for Bristol
- 1412 Thomas Yonge
- 1413 John Cleve
- 1414 Thomas Norton
- 1415 John Droyes
- 1416 John Sharpe
- 1417 Thomas Blount
- 1418 Robert Russell
- 1419 John Newton
- 1420 James Cokkys
- 1421 Thomas Yonge
- 1422 John Spyre
- 1423 Mark William
- 1424 John Burton
- 1425 John Leycester, MP for Bristol
- 1426 John Cleve
- 1427 Robert Russell
- 1428 John Newtone
- 1429 Roger Levedone
- 1430 John Burton
- 1431 John Leycester
- 1432 Richard Trenolde
- 1433 John Sharpe
- 1434 John Fisher
- 1435 Thomas Halleway
- 1436 John Miltone
- 1437 Richard Forster
- 1438 Clement Bagod
- 1439 Hugh Wethrforde
- 1440 John Sharpe
- 1441 Nicholas Ferme
- 1442 William Canynges, MP for Bristol, 1439, 1450–1 and 1455
- 1443 Clement Bagod
- 1444 John Stanley
- 1445 John Shipwarde
- 1446 Nicholas Hille
- 1447 Richard Forster
- 1448 Richard Forster
- 1449 John Burton
- 1450 William Canynges
- 1451 John Burton
- 1452 John Stanley
- 1453 William Codir
- 1454 Robert Sturmy, merchant
- 1455 Richard Hatter
- 1456 John Shipwarde
- 1457 William Canynges
- 1458 Philip Mede, MP
- 1459 Philip Mede, MP
- 1460 Thomas Rogers
- 1461 William Canynges
- 1462 Philip Mede, MP
- 1463 John Wykam
- 1464 John Shipwarde
- 1465 William Codir
- 1466 William Spencer
- 1467 William Canynges
- 1468 Robert Jakys
- 1469 Philip Mede, MP
- 1470 John Shipwarde
- 1471 John Hawkes
- 1472 John Cogan
- 1473 William Spence
- 1474 Robert Strange
- 1475 William Bird
- 1476 John Baggott
- 1477 John Shipward
- 1479 Edmund Westcott
- 1480 Wm. Wodington
- 1481 John Foster
- 1482 Robert Strange
- 1483 Henry Vaughan
- 1484 Wm. Wickham
- 1485 Edmund Westcott
- 1486 Wm. Wickham
- 1487 John Esterfield
- 1488 John Pinke
- 1489 Robert Strange
- 1490 John Stevens
- 1491 William Toker
- 1492 Clement Wiltshire
- 1493 Henry Vaughan
- 1494 John Easterfield
- 1495 William Regent
- 1496 John Drewes
- 1497 Henry Dale
- 1498 Philip Kingston
- 1499 Nicholas Brown

=== 1500s ===
- 1500 Nicholas Brown
- 1501 Richard Vaughan
- 1502 George Monoy
- 1503 Hugh Johns
- 1504 Henry Dale
- 1505 David Cogan (alias Philip)
- 1506 Philip Ringston
- 1507 John Vaughan
- 1508 Richard Hoby
- 1509 John Capell
- 1510 John Poplay
- 1511 John Rowland
- 1512 John Ellyott
- 1513 William Bedford
- 1514 Robert Thorne, the elder
- 1515 Roger Dawes
- 1516 John Vaughan
- 1517 Richard Hoby
- 1518 John Edward
- 1519 John Williams
- 1520 Roger Dawes
- 1521 John Shipman
- 1522 John Rowland
- 1523 John Williams
- 1524 John Hutton
- 1525 Richard Abingdon
- 1526 Thomas Broke
- 1527 John Ware
- 1528 Richard Tonnell
- 1529 John Shipman
- 1530 Thomas White
- 1531 Thomas Pacy
- 1532 Clement Bays
- 1533 William Shipman
- 1534 Roger Cook
- 1535 John Hutton
- 1536 Richard Abingdon
- 1537 William Chester
- 1538 Thomas Jeffery
- 1539 Roger Cook
- 1540 John Springe
- 1541 Robert Elliot
- 1542 Henry White
- 1543 Thomas Pacy
- 1544 Nicholas Thorne
- 1545 Robert Adams
- 1546 William Cary
- 1547 John Smyth
- 1548 William Pyckes
- 1549 William Jay
- 1550 David Harris
- 1551 Roger Cook
- 1552 William Chester
- 1553 John Northall
- 1554 John Smyth
- 1555 William Young
- 1556 Robert Saxse
- 1557 William Pepwall
- 1558 Robert Adams
- 1559 Roger Jones
- 1560 William Carr
- 1561 John Reekes
- 1562 John Stone
- 1563 Nicholas Williams
- 1564 Anthony Standback
- 1565 John Northall
- 1566 John Cutt
- 1567 William Pepwall
- 1568 John Stone
- 1569 Thomas Chester
- 1570 William Tucker
- 1571 John Stone
- 1572 John Brown
- 1573 Thomas Kelke
- 1574 George Snigg
- 1575 John Prewett
- 1576 John Wade
- 1577 Thomas Colston
- 1578 John Roberts
- 1579 Thomas Young
- 1580 Thomas Slocombe
- 1581 Philip Langley
- 1582 Thomas Aldworth
- 1583 Walter Pykes
- 1584 Thomas Rowland
- 1585 Richard Cole
- 1586 William Hicks
- 1587 John Barnes
- 1588 Robert Kitchen
- 1589 William Bird
- 1590 John Hopkins
- 1591 Walter Standfast
- 1592 Thomas Aldworth
- 1593 Michael Pepwall
- 1594 Francis Knight
- 1595 William Parfey
- 1596 William Yate
- 1597 John Webb
- 1598 William Ellis
- 1599 John Hart

=== 1600s ===
- 1600 John Hopkins, MP for Bristol
- 1601 William Vawer
- 1602 Ralfe Hurte
- 1604, 1615 John Whitson, MP for Bristol, 1605, 1628
- 1605, 1614 Thomas James, MP for Bristol, 1604–14
- 1609 Robert Aldworth, merchant and philanthropist
- 1611 William Cary, draper
- 1612 Abel Kitchin, merchant
- 1617 George Harrington
- 1618 John Guy, first Governor of Newfoundland
- 1620 John Doughty, MP for Bristol, 1626–29
- 1625 John Barker, MP for Bristol, 1624, 1628
- 1627 Sir John Gunning (Gonning), Sr
- 1629 Humphrey Hooke, MP for Bristol, 1640–42
- 1632 Henry Hobson, innkeeper
- 1636 Richard Longe, MP for Bristol, 1640–42
- 1640 John Tailer, MP for Bristol, 1642–44
- 1642 Richard Aldworth, MP for Bristol, 1646
- 1643 Humphrey Hooke, MP for Bristol, 1640–42
- 1645 Sir John Gunning (Gonning), Jr, after Francis Creswick was deemed Royalist
- 1649 Miles Jackson, MP for Bristol, 1654, 1656
- 1650 Hugh Browne
- 1651 Joseph Jackson, MP for Bristol, 1659
- 1663 John Knight, MP for Bristol, 1660.
- 1678 John Lloyd (mayor of Bristol)
- 1684 William Hayman, Bristol merchant

=== 1700s ===
- 1700 Sir William Daines, MP for Bristol, 1701, 1715
- 1710 Abraham Elton, MP for Bristol, 1722–27
- 1719 Sir Abraham Elton, 2nd Baronet, MP for Bristol, 1727–42
- 1780 William Miles 1728–1803, Bristol Corporation 1766, Sheriff 1766, Mayor 1780–81, Alderman 1782–
- 1781 Henry Cruger, MP for Bristol, 1774–80, 1784–90
- 1790 John Harris, merchant, participant in slavery debates
- 1797/8 Thomas Daniel merchant, Alderman 1798-1835, Councillor 1835-1841, Sheriff 1796/7

=== 1800s ===
- 1833 Charles Ludlow Walker
- 1837, 1838, 1845, 1848, 1849, 1850 Sir John Kerle Haberfield
- 1844 Richard King, merchant
- 1851 Henry Gore-Langton, MP for Bristol, 1852–65
- 1852 Robert Gay Barrow
- 1853, 1854 John George Shaw
- 1855, 1856 John Vining
- 1857 Isaac Alan Cooke
- 1858 James Poole
- 1859 John Bates
- 1860 Odiarne Coates Lane
- 1861 John Hare
- 1862 Sholto Vere Hare
- 1863 Thomas Porter Jose
- 1864 William Naish
- 1865 Joseph Abraham
- 1866 Elisha Smith Robinson, businessman
- 1867 William Gale Cole
- 1868 William Gale Cole
- 1869 William Killigrew Wait, MP for Gloucester, 1873–80
- 1870 Thomas Canning
- 1871 William Proctor Baker
- 1872 William Hathway
- 1873 Thomas Barnes
- 1874 Christopher James Thomas
- 1875 John Avery Jones
- 1876 George Edwards
- 1877 George Edwards
- 1878 George Edwards
- 1879 Henry Taylor
- 1880, 1881, 1882, 1883 Joseph Dodge Weston, MP for Bristol South, 1885, and Bristol East, 1890
- 1884, 1885, 1887, 1888, 1889, 1890 Sir Charles Wathen
- 1886 George William Edwards
- 1891 Charles Highett MD
- 1892 William Robert Barker
- 1893, 1894 Robert Henry Symes
- 1895 Howell Davies, MP for Bristol South 1906–22
- 1896, 1897 Robert Henry Syms
- 1898 Herbert Ashman

== Lord mayors of Bristol: 1899–present ==
- 1899: Sir Herbert Ashman (Leather Merchant - First Lord Mayor)
- 1900: James Colthurst Godwin
- 1901: Charles Edward Ley Gardner
- 1902: Sir Robert Henry Symes
- 1903: Sir Robert Henry Symes
- 1904: Edward Burnett James
- 1905: Alfred John Smith
- 1906: Alfred John Smith
- 1907: Sir Edward Burnet James
- 1908: Edward Robinson
- 1909: Christopher Albert Hayes
- 1910: Christopher Albert Hayes
- 1911: Sir Frank William Wills
- 1912: Charles James Lowe
- 1913: John Swaish
- 1914: John Swaish
- 1915: Barclay Josiah Baron
- 1916: Barclay Josiah Baron
- 1917: Frank Sheppard
- 1918: Henry William Twiggs
- 1919: James Thomas Francombe
- 1920: George Bryant Britton (Shoe manufacturer)
- 1921: Ernest Henry Cook
- 1922: Alfred Dowling
- 1923: Alfred Arthur Senington
- 1924: Ernest Brookhouse Richards
- 1925: Frank Moore
- 1926: Edward Malachi Dyer
- 1927: John Curle
- 1928: William Henry Eyles
- 1929: Walter Bryant
- 1930: Frederick Francis Clothier
- 1931: John Hampden Inskip
- 1932: Thomas James Wise
- 1933: Francis Crispin Luke
- 1934: Herbert John Maggs
- 1935: Charles Theodore Budgett
- 1936: Albert Francis Moon
- 1937: John James Milton
- 1938: William Albert Winchester
- 1939: Albert-Whitfield Stone Burgess
- 1940: Thomas Henry Johnson Underdown
- 1941: Ebenezer Thomas Cozens
- 1942: Henry Arthur Wall
- 1943: Frederick Charles Williams
- 1944: William Frederick Cottrell
- 1945: James Owen
- 1946: Gilbert Sydney James
- 1947: Charles Richard Gill
- 1948: Charles Richard Gill
- 1949: Percy Walter Cann
- 1950: Frederick Arthur Parish
- 1951: Robert Francis Lyne
- 1952: Vincent James Gerald Ross
- 1953: Kenneth Alfred Leader Brown
- 1954: Gilbert George Adams
- 1955: Harry Crook
- 1956: George Alton Watson Allan
- 1957: Percy Whitehead Raymond
- 1958: Fitzroy George William Chamberlain
- 1959: William George Cozens
- 1960: Alexander Hugh Jenkins
- 1961: Charles Herbert Smith
- 1962: Leonard King Stevenson
- 1963: Florence Mills Brown
- 1964: Kenelm Antony Philip / Dalby
- 1965: Thomas Henry Martin
- 1966: Cyril Hebblethwaite
- 1967: Revd. Frederick Charles Vyvyan-Jones
- 1968: Mercia Evelyn Castle
- 1969: Herbert William Major Willcox
- 1970: Geoffrey Palmer
- 1971: Helen Bloom
- 1972: Edwin Roberts (died in office 27 March 1973) / Helen Bloom (acting Lord Mayor until 15 May 1973)
- 1973: Walter William Jenkins
- 1974: Albert George Peglar
- 1975: Hubert James Williams
- 1976: Jack Desmond Fisk
- 1977: Edward James Wright
- 1978: Charles Edwin Merritt
- 1979: Thomas John Clarke
- 1980: Victor William Pople
- 1981: William Ernest Blackmore
- 1982: George Edward Maggs
- 1983: Frederick John Apperley
- 1984: Claude Draper
- 1985: Jack Maurice Bosdet
- 1986: Joan Jones
- 1987: Christopher Dominic Marmaduke Bellairs Alderson
- 1988: Derek Baisley Tedder
- 1989: Kathleen Minnie Mountstephen
- 1990: James Alexander Williams
- 1991: Peter John Abraham
- 1992: John Channon
- 1993: John Channon
- 1994: Claire Margaret Warren
- 1995: Joan Barbara McLaren
- 1996: Joan Barbara McLaren
- 1997: Jack Fisk
- 1998: Graham Roy Robertson
- 1999: Graham Roy Robertson
- 2000: Graham Roy Robertson
- 2001: Brenda Patricia Hugill
- 2002: William Leslie Martin
- 2003: William Leslie Martin
- 2004: Simon Timothy Cook (Actor)
- 2005: Peter John Abraham
- 2006: Peter John Abraham
- 2007: Royston Alan Griffey
- 2008: Christopher Davies
- 2009: Christopher Davies
- 2010: Colin Smith
- 2011: Geoffrey Richard Gollop
- 2012: Peter Main
- 2013: Faruk Choudhury
- 2014: Alastair Watson
- 2015: Clare Campion-Smith
- 2016: Jeff Lovell
- 2017: Lesley Alexander
- 2018: Cleo Lake
- 2019: Jos Clark
- 2020: Jos Clark
- 2021: Steve Smith
- 2022: Paula O'Rourke
- 2023: Paul Goggin
- 2024: Andrew Varney
- 2025: Henry Michallat
- 2026: Yassin Mohamud

== Directly elected mayors: 2012–2024 ==
The Local Government Act 2000 required local authorities in England to move from the traditional committee-based system of decision making to one based on an executive, also allowing the possibility of a directly elected mayor. The first directly elected mayor was in Greater London in 2000. Others followed in other authorities, including Hartlepool, Middlesbrough, Tower Hamlets, Liverpool and Salford.

The role was created after a local referendum held on 3 May 2012, which followed the passage of the Localism Act 2011. 41,032 voted for an elected mayor and 35,880 voted against, with a turnout of 24%. An election for the new post was held on 15 November 2012.

On 7 December 2021, Bristol City Council voted in favour of holding another referendum on the position of mayor in May 2022, with regard to whether to retain the position or return to decision-making by councillors. The referendum result was to abolish the position, and replace it with a committee system at the end of the current mayoral term in May 2024.

=== List ===
Political party	Name	Entered office	Left office
Bristol 1st	George Ferguson	19 Nov 2012	8 May 2016
Labour	Marvin Rees	9 May 2016	3 May 2024

=== Elections and referendums ===
==== 2012 referendum ====
Following the passage of The City of Bristol (Mayoral Referendum) Order 2012 by the United Kingdom Parliament in February 2012, a referendum was announced for 3 May 2012.

Nine other cities also held referendums on the same day: Birmingham, Bradford, Coventry, Leeds, Manchester, Newcastle upon Tyne, Nottingham, Sheffield and Wakefield. In addition, Doncaster Borough Council voted to hold a referendum on the same day to decide whether or not to retain their existing elected mayoral system, having been one of the earliest authorities to adopt the mayoral system in 2001.

Campaigning groups supporting (A Mayor for Bristol) and opposing (Bristol Says No!) an elected mayor were established. A debate organised by the University of Bristol took place in the Council House on 22 February 2012.

During the campaign, there were complaints that many voters did not receive leaflets produced by the city council explaining what the referendum was about. Cities minister, Greg Clark accused the council of inaccuracies in the leaflet and refused to cover the printing costs. After Clark promised more powers would be available to Bristol with an elected mayor, the city council accused him of "blackmail".

The result, declared on 4 May 2012 by returning officer Stephen McNamara and chaired by Jaya Chakrabarti, was in favour of creating the position. Bristol was the only one of the ten cities voting that day to choose to have an elected mayor.

Bristol Mayoral referendum 4 May 2012
Choice	Votes	%
Elected Mayor	41,032	53.35
Cabinet System	35,880	46.65
Total	76,912	100.00
Registered voters/turnout		24

==== 2012 election ====
The first election for the new post was held on 15 November 2012, the same day as elections for a police and crime commissioner for the Avon and Somerset Constabulary area. A number of potential candidates expressed an interest in standing, and 15 candidates stood for election to be mayor.

The supplementary vote system was used for the elections, with each voter being entitled to list a first and second choice candidate. In this system if no candidate has more than half of the votes plus one in the first round of counting, all candidates other than the top two are eliminated and voters' second choices from the eliminated candidates are then allocated to the remaining candidates. The second election for mayor of Bristol took place in May 2016.

Bristol Mayoral Election 15 November 2012
Party	Candidate	1st round		2nd round			1st round votesTransfer votes, 2nd round
Party	Candidate	Total	Of round	Transfers	Total	Of round	1st round votesTransfer votes, 2nd round
Bristol 1st	George Ferguson	31,321	35.13%	6,032	37,353	52.94%	
Labour	Marvin Rees	25,896	29.05%	5,363	31,259	47.06%	
Conservative	Geoff Gollop	8,136	9.13%				
Liberal Democrats	Jon Rogers	6,202	6.96%				
Green	Daniella Radice	5,248	5.89%				
Independent	Owain George	2,404	2.70%				
Independent	Spud Murphy	1,855	2.08%				
Respect	Neil Maggs	1,568	1.76%				
Independent	Stoney Garnett	1,413	1.58%				
TUSC	Tom Baldwin	1,412	1.58%				
Independent	Tim Collins	1,037	1.16%				
Independent	Philip Pover	994	1.11%				
Independent	Tony Britt	761	0.85%				
Independent	Rich Fisher	494	0.55%				
The Birthday Party	Dave Dobbs	411	0.46%				
Bristol 1st win							

Turnout at the 2012 election was 27.92%.

==== 2016 election ====
Bristol Mayoral Election 5 May 2016
Party	Candidate	1st round		2nd round			1st round votesTransfer votes, 2nd round
Party	Candidate	Total	Of round	Transfers	Total	Of round	1st round votesTransfer votes, 2nd round
Labour	Marvin Rees	56,729	40.4%	12,021	68,750	62.5%	
Bristol 1st	George Ferguson	32,375	23.1%	7,202	39,577	37.5%	
Conservative	Charles Lucas	19,617	14.0%				
Green	Tony Dyer	10,000	7.1%				
Liberal Democrats	Kay Barnard	8,078	5.8%				
UKIP	Paul Anthony Turner	7,115	5.1%				
TUSC	Tom Baldwin	1,876	1.3%				
Independent	Stoney Garnett	1,384	1.0%				
Independent	Christine Charlotte Townsend	1,010	0.7%				
Independent	Tony Britt	877	0.6%				
Independent	Paul Anthony Saville	545	0.4%				
Independent	John Langley	367	0.3%				
Independent	Mayor Festus Kudehinbu	341	0.2%				
Labour gain from Bristol 1st							

Turnout in the 2016 election was 44.87%.

==== 2021 election ====
Because of the 2020 COVID-19 pandemic, elections for the mayor of Bristol were delayed from 2020 to May 2021. The mayoral term following these elections was shortened by a year.

Bristol Mayoral Election 6 May 2021
Party	Candidate	1st round		2nd round			1st round votesTransfer votes, 2nd round
Party	Candidate	Total	Of round	Transfers	Total	Of round	1st round votesTransfer votes, 2nd round
Labour	Marvin Rees	50,510	36.3%	8,766	59,276	56.5%	
Green	Sandy Hore-Ruthven	36,331	26.1%	9,332	45,663	43.5%	
Conservative	Alastair Watson	25,816	18.6%				
Liberal Democrats	Caroline Gooch	15,517	11.2%				
Independent	Sean Donnelly	4,956	3.6%				
TUSC	Tom Baldwin	3,194	2.3%				
Independent	John Langley	1,528	1.1%				
Reform	Robert Clarke	806	0.6%				
Independent	Oska Shaw	389	0.3%				
Labour hold							

Turnout at the 2021 election was 41.15%.

==== 2022 referendum ====
On 7 December 2021, the majority of elected Councillors backed a legally binding motion to hold a referendum on the future of the role of the Mayor of Bristol. In May 2022, the people of Bristol voted to abolish the role of mayor in the referendum, with a turnout of 28.6%. The position ceased to exist in 2024, at the end of Rees's second term.

Bristol Mayoral referendum 5 May 2022
Choice	Votes	%
Committee System	56,113	59.35
Elected Mayor	38,439	40.65
Total	94,552	100.00
Registered voters/turnout		28.59%
Source: https://www.bristol247.com/news-and-features/news/bristol-votes-to-scrap-mayoral-model-of-governance/

== See also ==
- Politics of Bristol
- Mayor of the West of England

== Archives ==
Papers, photographs and newscuttings relating to Percy Cann are held at Bristol Archives (Ref. 33292) (online catalogue).
