= High Sheriff of Bristol =

Ceremonial officer of Bristol, England

This is a list of civic sheriffs and high sheriffs of the County of the City of Bristol, England.

The office of high sheriff is over 1,000 years old, with its establishment before the Norman Conquest. The high sheriff remained first in precedence in the counties until the reign of Edward VII when an Order in Council in 1908 gave the lord-lieutenant the prime office under the Crown as the sovereign's personal representative. The high sheriff remains the sovereign's representative in the county for all matters relating to the judiciary and the maintenance of law and order.

Bristol is unusual in having had county status since medieval times (1373). The Lord Mayor and one or sometimes two sheriffs served as part of its civic governance. The county was expanded to include suburbs such as Clifton in 1835, and it was named a county borough in 1889, when the term was first introduced. However, on 1 April 1974 it became a part of the local government county of Avon. On 1 April 1996 Avon was abolished, allowing the city of Bristol to become a unitary authority and gain its ceremonial independence and county status as the County of City of Bristol, with the royal appointments of Lord-Lieutenant and High Sheriff.

== Civic (not High) Sheriff Office holders ==
=== 14th & 15th century ===
Sheriffs of Bristol typically took office at the end of September and served until September of the following year.

- 1373: John Viell
- 1374: Thomas Beaupyne
- 1379: Thomas Knap
- 1382: John Canynges
- 1383: Robert Gardener
- 1387: William Frome
- 1391: John Banbury
- 1394: John Stevens
- 1399: Thomas Blount
- 1401: Thomas Norton
- 1404: John Droys
- 1407: Thomas Young
- 1408: John Clyve
- 1411: John Spyne
- 1413: John Newton
- 1414: John Russell
- 1416: David Dudbroke
- 1417: John Leycester
- 1418: John Burton
- 1422: Richard Trenode
- 1425: Robert Colville
- 1428: Henry Gildeney
- 1438: William Canynges
- 1450-1: Robert Sturmy
- 1451-2: Richard Hatter
- 1452-3: Thomas Mede
- 1453-4: William Howell
- 1454-5: Philip Mede
- 1455-6: Thomas Rogers
- 1456-7: William Damme
- 1457-8: John Wykham
- 1458-9: John Bagot
- 1459-60: Robert Jakes
- 1460-61: Thomas Kempson
- 1461-2: William Spenser
- 1462-3: Richard Alberton
- 1463-4: John Hawkes
- 1464-5: John Cogan
- 1465-6: John Clerk
- 1466-7: John Gaywood
- 1467-8: John Hoper
- 1468-9: Robert Strange
- 1469-70: William Bridde
- 1470-71: Henry Chester (died in office); John Shipward the younger (from 18 Feb 1471)
- 1471-2: William Wodington
- 1472-3: John Jay
- 1473-4: Edmund Westcote
- 1474-5: John Forster (Foster)
- 1475-6: Thomas Rowley
- 1476-7: William Wykeham
- 1477-8: Henry Vaughan
- 1478-9: John Scryven
- 1479-80: John Powke
- 1480-81: William Toket
- 1481-2: John Pynke
- 1482-3: John Esterfield
- 1483-4: John Stevens
- 1484-5: John Swayne
- 1485-6: Richard Sherman
- 1486-7: John Snygge
- 1487-8: John Chester
- 1488-9: Clement Wilteshire
- 1489-90: Thomas Spicer
- 1490-91: William Regent
- 1491-2: Henry Dale
- 1492-3: John Drewes
- 1493-4: Philip Ringstone
- 1494-5: Matthew Jubbes
- 1495-6: Nicholas Broune
- 1496-7: Hugh Jones (or Johns)
- 1497-8: Richard Vaughan
- 1498-9: John Jay
- 1499-1500: Philip Green

=== 16th century ===
- 1500: Hugh Elliot; John Batten
- 1501: Thomas Snyg; Thomas Paruaunt
- 1502: John Collor; John Capell
- 1503: Richard ap Merrick; William Bedford
- 1504: William Jefferis; Edward Penson
- 1505: Thomas Elliott; John Harris
- 1506: William Edwards; John Attwillis
- 1507: John Edwards; Simon Jarvis
- 1508: John Matthews; William Neal
- 1509: John Williams; John Wilkins
- 1510: Robert Hutton; Ralph Aprys
- 1511: John Hutton; Humphrey Brown
- 1512: Thomas Dale; Thomas Broke
- 1513: William Wosley; John Shipman
- 1514: John Ware; Richard Tonnell
- 1515: Richard Abingdon; William Vaughan
- 1515: Thomas Pacy; Edward Prynne
- 1517: John Drewes; John Pepe
- 1518: John Hall; William Dale
- 1519: Clement Bays; Robert Sailbrige
- 1520: William Shipman; Robert Aventry
- 1521: Robert Ellyott; Roger Coke
- 1522: Gilbert Cogan; William Chester
- 1523: Robert Chapman; John Davis
- 1524: Thomas Jefferis; John Spring
- 1525: Henry White; John Jervis
- 1526: George Bathram; David Lawrence
- 1527: Thomas Nash; David Hutton
- 1528: Nicholas Thorn; John Thorn
- 1529: William Kelke; Thomas Silke
- 1530: George Hall; Robert Adams
- 1531: William Carey; John Mancell
- 1532: John Smith; William Pykes
- 1533: William Howell; Anthony Pain
- 1534: John Brampton; Nicholas Woodhouse
- 1535: Thomas Hart; John Northall
- 1536: Richard Prinn; Thomas Moore
- 1537: Thomas Winsmore; Rowland Cowper
- 1538: David Harris; William Jay
- 1539: William Rowley; William Young
- 1540: William Spratt; Richard Morse
- 1541: Richard Watley; Robert Saxse
- 1542: William Ballard; William Pepwall
- 1543: Francis Codrington; Thomas Landsdown
- 1544: John Gurney; Roger Jones
- 1545: William Carr; Robert Davis
- 1546: John A Wellis; Thomas Joackym
- 1547: Thomas Harris; William Tindall
- 1548: Edward Tynte; John Mathews
- 1549: Edward Prynne; John Stone
- 1550: Roger Milward; Thomas Sheward
- 1551: William Jones; Nicholas Williams
- 1552: Thomas Tyson; Anthony Standback
- 1553: John Pikes sen.; Thomas Pikes jun.
- 1554: Giles White; John Cutt
- 1555: Thomas Shipman; John Griffiths
- 1556: George Snigg; William Butler
- 1557: William Tucker; Arthur Richards
- 1558: John Brown; John Prewett
- 1559: Thomas Chester; Thomas Kelke
- 1560: Michael Sowdelay; George Higgins
- 1561: John Wade; Thomas Colston
- 1562: John Roberts; William Belsher
- 1563: Thomas Young; Richard Davis
- 1564: Edmund Jones; Thomas Slocomb
- 1565: William Young; John Jones
- 1566: Philip Langley; Thomas Aldworth
- 1567: Dominick Chester; Walter Pykes
- 1568: Thomas Kyrkland; Robert Smith
- 1569: Thomas Rowland; Richard Cole
- 1570: William Hicks; John Barnes
- 1571: Thomas Warren; Randolph Hassell
- 1572: William Gibbons; Robert Kitchen
- 1573: Edward Porter; William Bird
- 1574: William Saltern; Robert Halton
- 1575: Michael Pepwall; Nicholas Blake
- 1576: John Ash; Richard Ashurst
- 1577: William Hopkins; Walter Standfast
- 1578: William Prewett; Ralph Dole
- 1579: George Bathram; Francis Knight
- 1580: William Parfey; William Yate
- 1581: Bartholomew Cook; Humpry Andrews
- 1582: Thomas Pollington; John Webb
- 1583: Walter Davis; William Ellis
- 1584: Rice Jones; Richard Kelke
- 1585: Henry Gough; John Hart
- 1586: Edward Long; John Hopkins
- 1587: William Vawer; Ralph Hurt
- 1588: Nicholas Hobbs; John Oliver
- 1589: John Whitson; Christopher Kedgwin
- 1590: George Snow; Hugh Griffith
- 1591: Thomas James;Walter Williams
- 1592: Richard May; John Young
- 1593: John Barker; Richard Smith
- 1594: Matthew Haviland; Thomas Pitcher
- 1595: Richard Rogers; John Sly
- 1596: John Boucher; Robert Aldworth
- 1597; John Englesfield; Richard George
- 1598: William Cary; Abel Kitchen
- 1599: William Colston; John Harrison

=== 17th century ===
- 1600 John Boulton; Thomas Hopkins
- 1601 William Hopkins; John Fowens
- 1602 John Aldworth; Thomas Farmer
- 1603 William Barnes; George Richards
- 1604 William Cole; George Harrington
- 1605 John Rowberowe; John Guy
- 1606 Thomas Packer; John Doughty
- 1607 Robert Rogers; Arthurs Needes
- 1608 Thomas Moore; William Young
- 1609 Thomas Aldworth; Wm. Challoner
- 1610 Thomas Whithead; William Pytte
- 1611 William Burrus; Henry Gibbes
- 1612 Christoper Cary; John Barker
- 1613 Christopher Whitson; John Gonning
- 1614 John Langton; Humphrey Hooke
- 1615 William Baldwyne; John Tomlinson
- 1616 Henry Yate; Henry Hobson
- 1617 Matthew Warren; William Turner
- 1618 Thomas Cecil; Thomas Wright
- 1619 Humphrey Browne; William Lyssett
- 1620 Andrew Charlton; Peter Miller
- 1621 Richard Holworthy;Richard Longe
- 1622 Edward Coxe; William Jones
- 1623 Oliver Snell; Ezekiel Wallis
- 1624 William Pitt jnr (died) and replaced by Thomas Clements;Nathaniel Butcher
- 1625 George Knight; John Taylor
- 1626 John Lock; Walter Ellis
- 1627 Richard Plea; Richard Aldworth
- 1628 Alexander James; Francis Creswick
- 1629 Giles Elbridge; Thomas Colston
- 1630 Derrick Popley; Gabriel Sherman
- 1631 John Gonning jnr; Miles Jackson
- 1632 Thomas Jackson; William Fitzherbert
- 1633 Robert Elliott; Thomas Lloyd
- 1634 John Langton; Thomas Hook
- 1635 William Cann; William Hobson
- 1636 Richard Vickris; Thos.Woodward
- 1637 Edward Peters, (died) and replaced by Abraham Edwards; William Wyat
- 1638 Luke Hodges; George Hellier
- 1639 Matthew Warren; Walter Deyos
- 1640 Henry Gibbes; Edward Pitt
- 1641 Richard Balman; Robert Yeamans
- 1642 Joseph Jackson; Hugh Browne
- 1643 Henry Creswick; William Colston
- 1644 Nathaniel Cale; William Bevan
- 1645 John Young; Walter Stevens
- 1646 Walter Sandy; Edward Tyson
- 1647 Arthur Farmer; George White
- 1648 Robert Challoner; Robert Yate
- 1649 William Dale; William Yeamans
- 1650 James Croft; George Hart
- 1651 George Lane; Robert Cann
- 1652 Jonathan Blackwell; Thomas Amory
- 1653 John Pope; Thomas Bubb
- 1654 Christopher Griffith; John Lawford
- 1655 Thomas Harris; John Bowen
- 1656 Robert Vickris; John Harper
- 1657 John Willoughby; Henry Appleton
- 1658 Edward Morgan; Nehemiah Collins
- 1659 Francis Gleed; Timothy Parker
- 1660 Richard Gregson; Thomas Langton
- 1661 Thomas Stevens; John Hickes
- 1662 John Wright; Robert Yeamans
- 1663 John Bradway; Richard Streamer
- 1664 John Knight; Ralph Olliffe
- 1665 William Crabb; Richard Crumpe
- 1666 John Lloyd; Joseph Creswick
- 1667 John Aldworth (died) and replaced by William Willett; Henry Gough
- 1668 Humphrey Little; Richard Hart
- 1669 Charles Powell; Edward Hurne
- 1670 Thomas Day; Thomas Eston
- 1671 Richard Stubbs; Thomas Earle
- 1672 Edward Young; John Cooke
- 1673 John Dymer (died) and replaced by William Hassell;John Cecil
- 1674 Samuel Wharton; Edward Fielding
- 1675 Charles Williams; George Lane
- 1676 Henry Gleson; Henry Merret
- 1677 William Donning; John Moore
- 1678 William Jackson; William Clutterbuck
- 1679 William Hayman; William Swymmer
- 1680 Abraham Saunders; Arthur Hart
- 1681 Sir John Knight;Richard Lane
- 1682 George Hart; John Combes
- 1683 Nathaniel Driver; Edmond Arundell
- 1684 Giles Merricke; James Twyford
- 1685 William Merricke; Robert Yate
- 1686 George Morgan; Edward Tocknell
- 1687 John Sandford; Samuel Wallis; Thomas Saunders;John Hine
- 1688 Thomas Liston; Joseph Jackson; Thomas Cole; George White
- 1689 John Bubb; John Blackwell
- 1690 Robert Dowding; John Yeamans
- 1691 John Bradway; William Opie
- 1692 James Pope; Henry Combe
- 1693 Marmaduke Bowdler; John Bacheler
- 1694 John Hawkins; Sir William Daines
- 1695 William Lewis; William French
- 1696 Francis Whitchurch; Peter Saunders
- 1697 Nathaniel Day; Joh Day
- 1698 George Stephens; John Swymmer
- 1699 William Whithead; James Hollidge

=== 18th century ===
- 1700 Robert Bound; Isaac Davies
- 1701 Samuel Bayly; Richard Bayly
- 1702 Abraham Elton;Christopher Shuter
- 1703 Thomas Hort; Henry Whithead
- 1704 Anthony Swymmer; Henry Walter
- 1705 Morgan Smith; Nathaniel Webb
- 1706 Abraham Hooke; Nicholas Hicks
- 1707 Onesiphorus Tyndall; Thomas Tyler
- 1708 Philip Freke; John Day
- 1709 James Haynes; Thomas Clement
- 1710 Edmund Mountjoy; Abraham Elton
- 1711 William Bayly; Poole Stokes
- 1712 Henry Watts;
- 1713 John Becher; Henry Swymmer
- 1714 William Whithead; Richard Taylor
- 1715 James Donning; Joseph Jefferis
- 1716 Robert Earle; Peter Day
- 1717 Henry Nash; John Price
- 1718 Samuel Stokes; Edward Foy
- 1719 Arthur Taylor; John King
- 1720 Robert Addison; Jacob Elton
- 1721 John Rich; Noblet Ruddock
- 1722 Robert Smith; Lionel Lyde
- 1723 John Blackwell; Nathaniel Wraxall
- 1724 Nathaniel Day; William Jefferis
- 1725 Stephen Clutterbuck; Michael Puxton
- 1726 Ezekial Longman; Henry Combe
- 1727 Richard Bayley; John Bartlett
- 1728 Henry Lloyd; Sir Abraham Elton, 3rd Baronet
- 1729 John Berrow; John Day
- 1730 Edward Buckler; William Barnsdale
- 1731 Edward Cooper; William Barnes
- 1732 John Foy; Buckler Weekes
- 1733 Michael Pope; Benjamin Glisson
- 1734 Thomas Curtis; James Laroche
- 1735 David Peloquin; John Clements
- 1736 Morgan Smith; Abraham Elton
- 1737 Joseph Iles; Henry Dampier
- 1738 John Combe; Giles Bayly
- 1739 Michael Becher; David Dehany
- 1740 Walter Jenkins; William Martin
- 1741 John Chamberlayne; Henry Mugleworth
- 1742 William Cossley; Jeremiah Ames
- 1743 Isaac Elton; John Durbin
- 1744 John Foy; Buckler Weekes
- 1745 Thomas Marsh; John Noble
- 1746 Henry Swymmer; Richard Farr jnr
- 1747 John Berrow; Giles Bayly
- 1748 John Daltera; Isaac Baugh
- 1749 William Barnes jnr; John Curtis
- 1750 George Weare; Joseph Love
- 1751 Henry Dampier; Isaac Baugh
- 1752 Daniel Woodward; Edward Whatley
- 1753 Henry Bright; Thomas Harris
- 1754 Thomas Knox; Thomas Deane
- 1755 Henry Weare; James Hilhouse
- 1756 Nathaniel Foy; Austin Goodwin
- 1757 Robert Gordon; Isaac Piguenit
- 1758 Samuel Webb; John Berrow
- 1759 Charles Hotchkin; John Noble
- 1760 Isaac Piguenit; Samuel Sedgley
- 1761 Joseph Daltera; William Barnes jnr
- 1762 William Weare; Thomas Farr
- 1763 Andrew Pope; John Durbin jnr
- 1764 James Laroche jnr; John Bull
- 1765 Isaac Elton jnr; Michael Miller jnr
- 1766 William Miles; Henry Cruger
- 1767 Edward Brice; Alexander Edgar
- 1768 John Crofts; Henry Lippincott
- 1769 John Merlott; George Daubeny
- 1770 Isaac Elton jnr; Henry Lippincott
- 1771 Levi Ames; Jeremy Baker
- 1772 John Noble; John Anderson
- 1773 Andrew Pope; Thomas Pierce
- 1774 John Durbin jnr; James Hill
- 1775 Edward Brice; John Noble
- 1776 John Farr; John Harris
- 1777 John Fisher Weare; Philip Protheroe
- 1778 Benjamin Loscombe; James Morgan jnr
- 1779 Edward Brice; John Harford
- 1780 Samuel Span; Joseph Smith
- 1781 Robert Colman; John Collard
- 1782 Rowland Williams; William Blake
- 1783 John Garnett; Anthony Henderson
- 1784 John Fisher Weare; John Harvey
- 1785 Joseph Harford; Stephen Nash
- 1786 Evan Baillie; Thomas Daniel jnr
- 1787 John Morgan; Robert Claxton
- 1788 James Hill; John Harris
- 1789 Henry Bengough; John Gordon jnr
- 1790 James Morgan; Rowland Williams
- 1791 Joseph Harford; Samuel Span
- 1792 Wm Gibbons; Joseph Gregory Harris
- 1793 Charles Young; John Page
- 1794 Robert Castle; Joseph Edye
- 1795 David Evans; John Wilcox
- 1796 John Foy Edgar; Azariah Pinney
- 1797 Edward Protheroe; John Span
- 1798 Daniel Wait; William Fripp
- 1799 Henry Bright; Worthington Brice

=== 19th century ===
- 1800 Robert Castle; Samuel Birch
- 1801 Samuel Span; Richard Vaughan jnr
- 1802 John Foy Edgar; Henry Protheroe
- 1803 Samuel Henderson jnr; John Haythorne
- 1804 Levi Amis jnr; Philip Protheroe
- 1805 William Inman; John Hilhouse Wilcox
- 1806 Henry Brooke; Edward Brice jnr
- 1807 Sir Henry Protheroe; John Haythorne
- 1808 Benjamin Bickley; Philip George
- 1809 Michael Castle; George King
- 1810 William Inman; James Fowler
- 1811 Edward Brice; Benjamin Bickley
- 1812 George Hillhouse; Abraham Hilhouse
- 1813 Benjamin Bickley; Philip George
- 1814 William Fripp jnr; James George jnr
- 1815 Benjamin Bickley; Philip George
- 1816 Edward Daniel; John Barrow
- 1817 George Hillhouse; Abraham Hillhouse
- 1818 Thomas Hassel; Nicholas Roch
- 1819 James George jnr; John Gardiner
- 1820 Thomas Hassell; Robert Jenkins
- 1821 Nicholas Roch; Thomas Camplin
- 1822 Gabriel Goldney; John Cave
- 1823 John Savage; Charles Pinney
- 1824 John Gardiner ; Charles Ludlow Walker
- 1825 Gabriel Goldney; John Savage
- 1826 Thomas Hassell; Daniel Stanton
- 1827 Charles Payne; Henry Wenman Newman
- 1828 Charles L Walker; Thomas Hooper Riddle
- 1829 Hugh William Danson; John Evans Lunell
- 1830 George Protheroe; William Claxton
- 1831 George Bengough; Joseph Lax
- 1832 James Norroway Franklyn; Michael Hinton Castle
- 1833 James Lean; Peter Maze jnr
- 1834 James N Franklyn; William Killgrew Wait
- 1836 Daniel Cave
- 1836 Thomas Kington
- 1837 Thomas Kington Baily
- 1838 Francis Savage
- 1839 Richard Vaughan
- 1840 Hugh Vaughan
- 1841 Thomas Jones
- 1842 Jeremiah Hill
- 1843 Thomas Wadham
- 1844 John Harding
- 1845 Thomas Hill
- 1846 Abraham Grey Harford Battersby
- 1847 Edward Sampson jnr
- 1848 Peter Maze jnr
- 1849 John Jasper Leigh Baily
- 1850 Joseph Walters Daubeny
- 1851 John Battersby Harford
- 1852 Robert Bright
- 1853 Philip John William Miles
- 1854 Robert Phippen
- 1855 Albany Bourchier Savile
- 1856 George Oldham Edwards
- 1857 John Henry Greville Smyth
- 1858 William Henry Hartford
- 1859 William Montague Baillie
- 1860 Joshua Saunders
- 1861 George Rocke Woodward
- 1862 Charles Daniel Cave
- 1863 William Wright
- 1864 Henry Cruger William Miles
- 1865 Joseph Cooke Hurle
- 1866 William Henry Miles
- 1867 William Gale Coles
- 1868 Robert Phippen (died July 1869)
- 1869 Thomas Proctor
- 1870 John Fisher
- 1871 William Thomas Poole King
- 1872 Thomas Todd Walton
- 1873 Thomas Todd Walton
- 1874 Charles Hill
- 1875 George Bright
- 1876 William Smith
- 1877 William Henry Wills
- 1878 Charles Bowles Hare
- 1879 Robert Low Grant Vassall
- 1880 Francis Frederick Fox
- 1881 William Edward George
- 1882 John Lysaght
- 1883 Henry Bourchier Osborne Savile
- 1884 John Harvey
- 1885 Reginald Wyndham Butterworth
- 1886 Francis James Fry
- 1887 Robert Henry Symes
- 1888 George Henry Pope
- 1889 James Henry Lockley
- 1890 James Henry Lockley
- 1891 Arthur Baker
- 1892 Alfred Deedes
- 1893 Col. Charles Coates
- 1894 William Pethick
- 1895 William Ansell Todd
- 1896 James Colthurst Godwin
- 1897 Francis Richardson Cross
- 1898 Charles Wills
- 1899 George Alfred Wills

=== 20th century ===
- 1900 Edward Burnet James
- 1901 Admiral Francis Arden Close
- 1902 Joseph Weston-Stevens
- 1903 William Henry Greville Edwards
- 1904 Herbert Cary George Batten
- 1905 Henry Lorymer Risely
- 1906 Henry Daniel
- 1907 Herbert Cary George Batten
- 1908 Stanley Hugh Badock
- 1909 George Risely
- 1910 George Risely
- 1911 Robert Edwin Bush
- 1912 Thomas Joseph Lennard
- 1913 Adam Cottam Castle
- 1914 John Stroud Gwyer William Stroud
- 1915 Herbert Edwin Chattock
- 1916 Lt Col. Joseph Beaumont Butler / Herbert Edwin Chattock
- 1917 Percy Steadman
- 1918 Ivie Mathew Dunlop
- 1919 William Alfred Titley
- 1920 Major Owen Stanley Davies
- 1921 Francis Nicholas Cowlin
- 1922 Horace Walker
- 1923 Frederick Burris
- 1924 Frank Oliver Wills
- 1925 Lionel Goodenough Taylor
- 1926 Frank Ernest Sampson
- 1927 James Arnold Arrowsmith-Brown
- 1928 Ernest John Taylor
- 1929 Henry James Gilbert Rudman
- 1930 Herbert George Tanner
- 1931 Edwin Stanley Gange
- 1932 Dr Walter Kenneth Wills
- 1933 Frank Sydney Philpott
- 1934 Thomas Hosegood Davies
- 1935 Gilbert Sydney James
- 1936 Vivian John Robinson
- 1937 Sidney Cox
- 1938 Col. Ernest William Leonard
- 1939 Charles Loraine Hill
- 1940 Clarence Herbert William Davey
- 1941 Harold Maurice Comer Hosegood
- 1942 Harold Maurice Comer Hosegood
- 1943 Harold Maurice Comer Hosegood
- 1944 Sydney Clifford
- 1945 Sydney Clifford
- 1946 Harry Crook
- 1947 Herbert John Thomas
- 1948 Hubert Chitty
- 1949 Frank Manning Arkle
- 1950 Joseph Henry Bennett
- 1951 Arthur Anthony Scull
- 1952 Stanley William Cornwall
- 1953 Alan Oliver Wills
- 1954 John Henshaw Britton
- 1955 Henry Richard Priday
- 1956 Arthur William Bryant
- 1957 William Ernest Wheatley
- 1958 George Thomas Bullock
- 1959 Dr Alexander MacAllister Maclachlan
- 1960 George Edward Maggs
- 1961 Charles Marcus Hartnell
- 1962 Stanley William Evans
- 1963 Arthur Ainslie Baker
- 1964 William Coldrick
- 1965 Francis Dorning Parry
- 1966 Frank A Ashley
- 1967 Kenneth Blandford Lalonde
- 1968 Gilbert Thomas
- 1969 John Norton Chivers
- 1970 Herbert Frederick George Skeates
- 1971 Robert Victor Cooke
- 1972 Iris Mary Knight
- 1973 George E Lucas
- 1974–1995 No sheriffs appointed

== High Sheriffs for the County of City of Bristol ==
=== 20th century ===
- 1996–1997: George Robin Paget Ferguson of Clifton
- 1997–1998: Richard Appleby Lalonde of Clifton
- 1998–1999: Edwin Howard Webber of Sneyd Park
- 1999–2000: John Richard Pool of Clifton

=== 21st century ===
- 2000–2001: Dr Charles St. John Hartnell of Cameley, Somerset
- 2001–2002: Dr Malcolm Joseph Campbell of Sneyd Park
- 2002–2003: John Christopher Savage of Clifton
- 2003–2004: Helen Mary Thornhill of Clifton
- 2004–2005: Valerie, Lady Kingman of Clifton
- 2005–2006: Roger Neale Baird of Sneyd Park
- 2006–2007: Richard Alan Lee of Redland
- 2007–2008: William Howard Robert Durie of Abbots Leigh, Somerset
- 2008–2009: Professor Richard Hodder-Williams of Clifton
- 2009–2010: Timothy Lachlan Chambers of Redland
- 2010–2011: Lois Patricia (Peaches) Golding of Leigh Woods, Somerset
- 2011–2012: Dr John Cottrell of Redland
- 2012–2013: Andrew Nisbet of Clifton
- 2013–2014: Dr Shaheen Shahzadi Chaudhry of Whitchurch
- 2014–2015: Henry Louis Michael Bothamley of Leigh Woods, Somerset
- 2015–2016: Dr Rosalind Penelope Kennedy of Clifton
- 2016–2017: Helen Mary Wilde of Redland
- 2017–2018: Anthony Roger Ernest Brown of Clifton
- 2018–2019: Roger Gordon Opie of Clifton
- 2019–2020: Charles John Calcraft Wyld of Clifton
- 2020–2021: Dr John Cyril Manley of Clifton
- 2021–2022: Susan Joan Davies of Knowle
- 2022–2023: Alexandra Olivia Ardalan Raikes of Henleaze
- 2023–2024: Sharon Rosemarie Foster of Horfield
- 2024–2025: Rev Richard Norman Pendlebury of Bishopston
- 2025–2026: Kalpna Kumari Woolf of Sneyd Park
- 2026–2027: Anne Marie Nisbet of Clifton

In nomination as prospective High Sheriffs:

- Mohammed Elfatih Elsharif of Southmead
- Andrew Street of Long Ashton, Somerset
- Sandra Eustene Meadows MBE of Brislington
