= Florence Brown =

British politician and first woman Lord Mayor of Bristol

Florence Mills Brown CBE (28 November 1898 – 6 March 1981) was Lord Mayor of Bristol in 1963–64. Brown was the first woman to be Lord Mayor of Bristol.

== Early life ==
Florence Mills Burgess was born in Bristol in 1898, the daughter of Frank & Florence Burgess. Brown was a tobacco stripper at the Wills tobacco factory in Bedminster, where she was also shop steward.

== Councillor, Alderman and Lord Mayor ==
Brown was a Labour candidate in St Augustine Ward in November 1936, narrowly losing to the incumbent Citizen candidate, Robert Lyne. She stood again in a by-election in Ss Philip and Jacob South Ward in February 1937.

Brown was elected unopposed for Ss Philip and Jacob South Ward in November 1937. She became an Alderman in 1955. She was Lord Mayor in 1963–64. She returned to being a councillor, retiring when she lost her seat on Cabot Ward in 1973.

She was awarded the CBE in 1966.

== Personal life ==
Brown married Frederick Hanson Brown (1897–1975) at St Augustine the Less, Bristol in 1923. She died in 1981, aged 82.

== Legacy ==
Florence Brown Special Needs School in Knowle West was named after her; it existed from 1969 to 2010. The school was named for her as Brown was active in disabled charities: she was the chair of Bristol Action Research for the Crippled Child.

In 2022 it was announced that a road would be named after Brown on the Imperial Park development in Bishopsworth on the former Imperial Tobacco site. It had originally been proposed to call the road Navy Cut, after an Imperial Tobacco product, but Marvin Rees, the elected Mayor of Bristol, vetoed the proposal.
