= Maurice Berkeley, 3rd Baron Berkeley =

English nobleman

Maurice Berkeley
- Arms of Berkeley: Gules, a chevron between ten crosses pattée six in chief and four in base argent
- Born: c. 1435; Berkeley Castle, Gloucestershire, England
- Died: September 1506
- Buried: Austin Friars, City of London
- Spouse: Isabel Meade
- Issue: Maurice Berkeley; Thomas Berkeley; James Berkeley; Anne Berkeley
- Father: James de Berkeley, 1st Baron Berkeley
- Mother: Isabel de Mowbray

Maurice Berkeley, de jure 3rd Baron Berkeley (c. 1435 – September 1506), of Thornbury in Gloucestershire, Maurice the Lawyer, was an English nobleman.

== Origins ==
He was born at Berkeley Castle in Gloucestershire, the younger son of James Berkeley, 1st Baron Berkeley (c. 1394–1463), James the Just, by his third wife Lady Isabel, daughter of Thomas Mowbray, 1st Duke of Norfolk. He was the younger brother and heir of William Berkeley, 1st Marquess of Berkeley, 2nd Baron Berkeley (1426–1492), William the Waste-All.

== Career ==
Because of his marriage to Isabel Meade, the daughter of a Bristol alderman, who was considered to be below his social status, Maurice was disinherited by his elder brother William Berkeley, 1st Marquess of Berkeley, 2nd Baron Berkeley (1426–1492), who died without surviving children. As he never therefore possessed Berkeley Castle, he had no claim to the ancient feudal barony of Berkeley, which was dependent on landholdings. It was assumed (according to a very unusual legal rationale) that the barony by writ created in 1412 was also held dependent on the tenure of Berkeley Castle (that is to say it was deemed a feudal barony or barony by tenure), and that it had thereby been forfeited by association, and thus Maurice never assumed for himself the title of Baron Berkeley which he should have inherited as a matter of course from his brother. Sir John Maclean, editor of Lives of the Berkeleys, refers to "the vexed question of the baronial tenure of Berkeley". Thus, the line of de facto Barons Berkeley ended with William but recommenced in 1553 with Maurice's great-grandson Henry Berkeley, 7th Baron Berkeley who recovered the Berkeley inheritance.

== Marriage and children ==
In 1465 Maurice married Isabel Mede (1444 - 29 May 1514), the daughter of Philip Mede (c.1415-1475) of Wraxall Place in the parish of Wraxall in Somerset, MP, an Alderman of Bristol and thrice Mayor of Bristol, in 1458-9, 1461-2 and 1468-9. Philip Mede was a merchant, and although a very wealthy man, was therefore considered to be below the social rank of gentry, which caused Maurice's brother to disinherit him for supposedly bringing the noble family of Berkeley into disrepute. In fact Philip Mede had provided valuable financing and had provided soldiers (and his nephews William Mede and Thomas Meade went up there, around 1470, perhaps to provide assistance) to fight on the side of William Berkeley, 1st Marquess of Berkeley, 2nd Baron Berkeley in the Battle of Nibley Green, a private battle over the inheritance of the Berkeley estates with his cousin Thomas Talbot, 2nd Viscount Lisle. By his wife he had four children:

- Sir Maurice Berkeley, de jure 4th Baron Berkeley (1467 - 12 September 1523), eldest son and heir, who was made a Knight of the Bath at the coronation of King Henry VIII in 1509. In 1484 he married Catherine Berkeley, a daughter of Sir William de Berkeley of Stoke Gifford in Gloucestershire.
- Thomas Berkeley, de jure 5th Baron Berkeley (1472 - 22 January 1532), 2nd son, who was knighted on 9 September 1513 by Thomas Howard, Earl of Surrey at the Battle of Flodden. He married firstly in 1505 to Alienor Constable (c. 1485 - d. 1540), widow of John Ingleby of Yorkshire and daughter of Marmaduke Constable by his wife Joyce Stafford. He married secondly to Cecily Arnold, a daughter and co-heiress to Sir .... Arnold of Gloucestershire, and widow of Richard Rowdon, Sheriff of Gloucestershire.
- James Berkeley (b. after 1472 - d. 1515), who in about 1498 married Susan FitzAlan, daughter of Sir William FitzAlan, a son of William FitzAlan, 16th Earl of Arundel by his wife Joan Neville.
- Anne Berkeley (d.1560), who married Sir William Denys (1470–1533) of Dyrham, Gloucestershire, a courtier of King Henry VIII and Sheriff of Gloucestershire in 1518 and 1526.

== Death and burial ==
He died in September 1506 aged 70 and was buried in the Austin Friars in the City of London, where his widow was also buried later in 1514.

== Notes ==
Peerage of England
Preceded by William Berkeley	de jure Baron Berkeley; 1492–1506	Succeeded by Maurice Berkeley
