= Growth of London Act 1657 =

Act of Parliament of England

- Act of Parliament
- Parliament of England
- Long title: An Act for the preventing the multiplicity of Buildings in and about the Suburbs of London, and within ten miles of the same.
- Territorial extent: England

Dates
- Royal assent: 26 June 1657

Status: Revoked

Text of statute as originally enacted

The Growth of London Act 1657 was an act of the Parliament of England to regulate suburban sprawl and building standards in and around the City of London.

Following the English Restoration in 1660, the act was considered void due to lack of royal assent.

== Background ==
In July 1580, Queen Elizabeth I issued a proclamation "banning new building and the subdivision of houses in London and within three miles around".

By 1657, the issue had worsened despite previous prohibitions, and the excessive number of new houses and buildings in London's suburbs was seen to be "very mischievous and inconvenient, and a great Annoyance and Nusance to the Commonwealth".

== Provisions ==
The act provided:

- For every new dwelling, house or building erected since 25 March 1620, within 10 miles of London's walls and without 4 acres (1.6 ha) of land attached, one year's rent or value must be paid to the Lord Protector. This applies to the full, improved yearly value of the property.
- If the houses are not rented at full market value, the fine shall be divided between owners and tenants as determined by appointed commissioners, considering the quality and value of their respective interests.
- Fines are to be paid in two instalments: half by 29 September 1657 (or within three months of the fine being set), and the other half by 25 March 25, 1658 (or within six months of the fine being set).
- A commission will be appointed to assess and collect fines. They will have the power to summon people, gather information, and impose fines for non-compliance.
- Local officials are required to certify all new buildings, their values, and occupants. The commissioners will use this information to set the fines.
- If a building is not certified within six months, a fine of two years' rent will be imposed. One-third of this goes to the informer who reports it.
- Once the fine is paid, the owners and occupiers are discharged from any further penalties related to the building's construction.
- Money collected will be used to pay the commissioners, registers, and other officials involved in implementing the act.
- After 29 September 1657, anyone building a new house without 4 acres of land attached will face a £100 fine, plus £20 per month for continuing to use such a building.
- New buildings in the City of London, City and liberty of Westminster, the Borough of Southwark and their suburbs must be built with brick or stone and must not jut out into the street. Violators face a £100 fine. - Exceptions, such as for churches, hospitals, and almshouses.
- Action taken under this act must be brought and commenced within one year of the offence being committed. Exceptions for any person with interest bought from the state (Kings, Queens, Princes, Bishops, Deans, Chapters, Delinquents). - Abatement of £7,000 on fine in the parish of Covent Garden for the late Francis Russell, Earl of Bedford and his sons, William Russell, Earl of Bedford, John Russell and Edward Russell in recognition of his expenses incurred building a church.
- Exemption for 250 acres (100 ha) of meadow lands next to the River Thames next to State's Dock and Yard at Deptford, bought by Sir John Barkstead and his Regiment by Robert Stanton, Samuel Moyer, Charles Harris and others tor create a harbour, conditional on the project being finished before 1 July 1667 and approval of the Lord Protector and the Council of State.
- Exemptions for houses erected with the poors stock by Governors of several hospitals in the City of London and Borough of Southwark, including Christ's Hospital, St Bartholomew's Hospital, Bridewell and Bethlehem Hospitals.
- Exemptions for new houses and buildings owned by the Society of Lincoln's Inn, James Cooper, Robert Henley and others in Lincoln's Inn Fields before 1 October 1659.
- Exemptions for houses and buildings built by Francis Finch in Lincoln's Inn Fields before 5 October 1659.
- Exemptions for land owned by Governors of the free school of St Olave's in Southwark or houses built for the poor upon Horsey-Down before 24 June 1659.
- Exemption for Sir John Barsted Knight to build new houses on land purchased in 1647, known as Bangor House on Shoe Lane.
- The Corporation for the Poor of London is allowed to improve a small parcel of ground within the Workhouse in the Minorites by building on it. This is to increase revenue for educating poor children and employing and relieving the poor.
- In recognition of John Holles, 2nd Earl of Clare expenses in building in Clement's Inn Fields, a free market was established there every Tuesday, Thursday, and Saturday. The market is granted all usual rights and customs of markets.
- Exemptions for houses occupied by mariners, ship-carpenters, and caulkers below London Bridge and within two furlongs of the River Thames.
- Exemptions for Edward Hall, John Hall, John Kizlingberry, Henry Sherborn, Roger Adey, Richard Tippin, John Philips, and Mary Thomson for a brick housing development in Stanhop Street by 1 October 1658.

== Repeal ==
King Charles I of England would not assent to bills from a Parliament at war with him during the English Civil War and Interregnum.

Following the English Restoration in 1660, all ordinances and acts passed at this time, including this act, were considered void due to their lack of royal assent.
