= Philip Mede =

Member of the Parliament of England

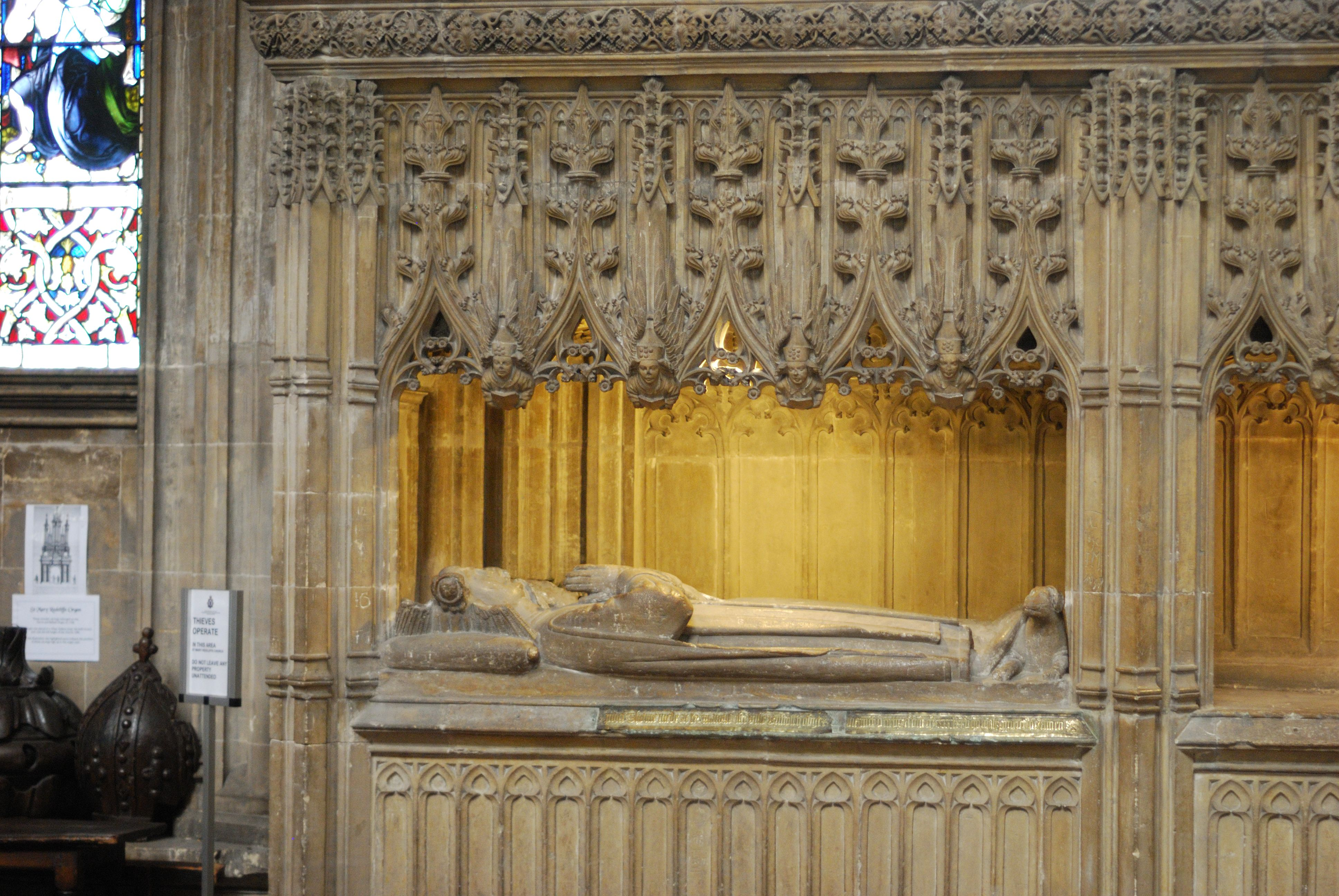
Monument with effigies to Philip Mede, Church of St Mary Redcliffe, Bristol

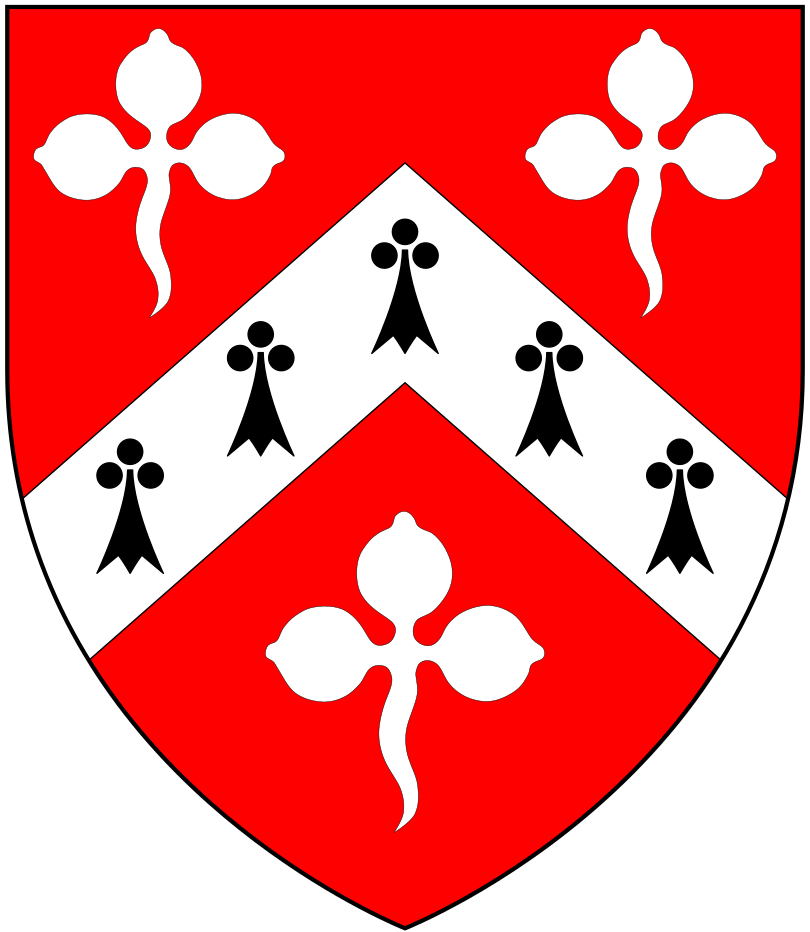
Arms of Mede: Gules, a chevron ermine between three trefoils slipped argent

Philip Mede (c. 1415-1475) (alias Meade, Meede, etc.) of Mede's Place in the parish of Wraxall in Somerset and of the parish of Saint Mary Redcliffe in Bristol, was a wealthy merchant at Bristol, then in Gloucestershire, and was twice elected a Member of Parliament for Bristol in 1459 and 1460, and was thrice Mayor of Bristol, in 1458-9, 1461-2 and 1468-9.

== Origins ==
He was the son of Thomas atte Mede, and brother of Sir Thomas Mede, Kt Bailiff of Bristol in 1438, and Sheriff of Bristol in 1452. The Mede family, anciently atte Mede, was possessed, before 1461, of an ancient capital messuage with 100 acres of land at Overton, in the parish of Arlingham, still known as 'Medes Land' in 1900.

== Career ==
Philip was Bailiff of Bristol in 1444, Mayor of Bristol in 1458, succeeding the great William Canynges, and again in 1461 and 1468, and was a Member of Parliament for Bristol in 1460. He was lord of the manor of Barrow, in Tickenham. In 1461 he obtained valuable charters for the City of Bristol from King Edward lV. In 1470 he raised in a single night a contingent of fighting men to support William de Berkeley, 2nd Baron Berkeley (1426-1492), later created 1st Marquess of Berkeley, of Berkeley Castle (north of Bristol), in his private Battle of Nibley Green.

== Marriage and children ==
He married Isabel, the daughter of Philip Ricard, of Bristol, merchant. She is identified in an entry of the plea rolls of the Court of Common Pleas in Easter term, 1442: Bristol. Philip Mede; Isabel his wife, formerly Isabel Ricard, daughter of Philip Ricard, burgess and merchant of Bristol. Their children included:

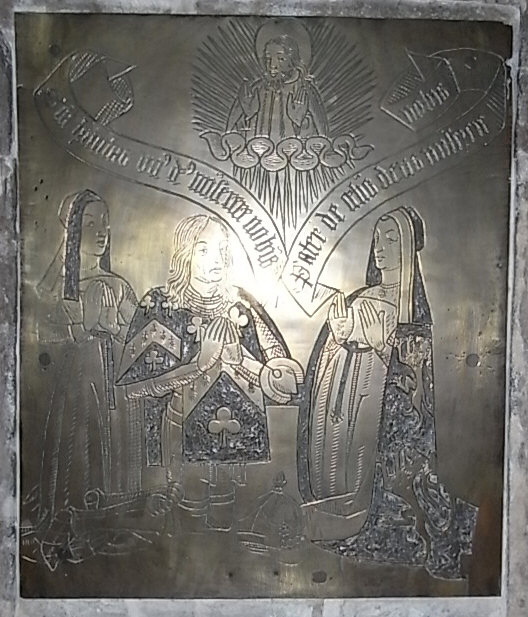
Monumental brass of Richard Mede (d. 1491), St. Mary Redcliffe Church, Bristol

- Richard Mede (d.1491), of Barrow Court in Tickenham, son and heir, who married twice, firstly to Elizabeth Sharpe, daughter of John Sharpe, and secondly to Anne Pauncefoot, daughter of Thomas Pauncefoot of Hasfield, in Gloucestershire. Anne survived her husband and remarried to Arthur Kemys. Richard's children all died young, and his heir was his sister Isabel Mede. Richard's monumental brass survives in the easternmost compartment of the "Mede Chantry" erected by his father (see below) in St. Mary Redcliffe Church, Bristol. It is an oblong plate, upon which are incised figures of a man kneeling opposite a kneeling woman with another woman standing behind him. He is of youthful appearance with smooth face and long flowing hair, and is clad in complete plate armour, over which he wears a tabard embroidered with the arms of Mede. He is without spurs and his helmet lies on the ground. His second wife kneeling opposite him wears a pedimental headdress with veil hanging down behind, necklace and girdle, and plain gown, over which is her mantle emblazoned with the arms of Pauncefoot: Gules, three lions rampant argent. The standing figure, Richard's first wife, is similarly clad, but without mantle. From the kneeling figures arise speech scrolls inscribed: from mouth of Richard: Sanct.. Trinitas un(us) de(us) miserere nobis "O Holy Trinity, one God, have pity on us"); Speech scroll from mouth of his wife: Pater de caelis, deus miserere nobis ("Father from Heaven, God have pity on us") addressed to the Holy Father, whose radiated demi-figure is engraved above, supported by a cloud (indicated by a line nebulée) with his hands raised in blessing.
- Rev. John Mede, a younger son, who obtained the degree of Master of Arts at St Edmund Hall, Oxford, and in 1467 was appointed vicar of Wraxall.
- Isabel Mede (d.1516/17), who in 1465 married secondly Maurice Berkeley, de jure 3rd Baron Berkeley (1435-1506), of Thornbury in Gloucestershire, the younger brother and heir apparent of William de Berkeley, 1st Marquess of Berkeley, 2nd Baron Berkeley of Berkeley Castle. The latter considered that his brother had married beneath his social status and, regardless of the assistance received from Philip Mede at the Battle of Nibley Green, disinherited him. Maurice Berkeley never bore the title Baron Berkeley, although he is deemed by later historians to have been his brother's valid heir and de jure 3rd Baron Berkeley. John Smith of Nibley (d.1641), steward of the Berkeley estates, the biographer of the family and author of "Lives of the Berkeleys" wrote as follows concerning the disinheritance:

"How little cause the Marquis Berkeley had to complain of the obscure parentage of the lady Isable, which he vainly called base, and of the unworthiness of his brother's match with so mean blood as he reproached it, making that a motive to his own vast expenses, and of the disinheritance of this Lord his brother, lest any of her base blood should inherit after him, may to his further reproof be returned upon his memory, to be but a feigned and unbrotherly quarrel picked on purpose to give colour to his own exorbitances. Like vain were his exceptions to his said brother and heir, for defending the virtue of his wife and worthiness of her parentage. She was a virtuous lady, and evermore content with better or harder fortunes."

Maurice later managed to recover over 50 manors and other lands which had been alienated illegally by his brother. By her deceased first husband she was the mother of three children who had all died young. She was the heir of her brother Richard Mede and thus was heir to his lands in Somerset, and the lease of Medes Place for 21 years, with other lands and tenements in the Gloucestershire, in Bedminster, Felonde, Ashton, Wraxale, and Middle Tykenham. Isabel died in 1516/17 aged 70, at Coventry, having survived her second husband for 19 years. Her body was carried with great pomp to the City of London and was buried by his side in the Austin Friars.

== Death and will ==
Philip Mede died in 1475, having dated his will on 11 January 1471. He ordered his body to be buried at the altar of St. Stephen, in the church of St Mary Redcliffe, to which he was a benefactor. His will included the following Latin text:

Lego corpus sepeliendum in ecclesia Beatae Mariae de Redcliff, juxta altare Sancti Stephani Martyris. Vicario ecclesiae de Redcliffe 20 solidos; fabricae ecclesiae unam pipam glasti. Omnia maneria terras, &c., in comitata Somerset et Bristol Isabellae uxori meae, remaneant Ricardo Mede filio meo, remaneant Maricio Berkeley et Isabellae filiae meae uxori ejus. Ordino et constituo executores testamenti mei Isabellam uxorem meam, Mauricium Berkeley, Isabellam uxorem ejus filiam meam, et Ricardum filium; ("I bequeath my body for burial in the church of the Blessed Mary of Radcliffe, next to the altar of St Stephen the Martyr. To the vicar of the church of Radcliffe (I bequeath) 20 shillings; to the fabric of the church one pipe of woad. All the manors and lands, etc., in the county of Somerset and in Bristol of Isabella my wife shall remain to Richard Mede my son, (and) shall remain to Maurice Berkeley and to Isabella my daughter, his wife. I order and constitute as executors of my will Isabella my wife, Maurice Berkeley, Isabella his wife and my daughter, and Richard my son")

== Mede Chantry ==
By his will Philip Mede founded and endowed a chantry, known as "Mede's Chantry". Its purpose was for a priest to say masses for the souls of Thomas Mede, Philip Mede and Isabel his wife, John Sharpe and Elizabeth his wife, and Richard Mede and Elizabeth and Anne his wives, as specified in his will. Following the Dissolution of the Monasteries and the subsequent suppression of chantries, the ornaments owned by the chantry were valued at 52 shillings and 8 pence and were in 1547-8 confiscated to the king's use. The income of the chantry at the Dissolution was £17 1 shilling, a large sum. It had been endowed with various lands, including the land now covered by 8-11 Park Row, Bristol, then comprising two gardens, a lodge and a close.

== Burial and monument ==
From his will it appears that the surviving fine double monument, known as the "Mede Chantry (chapel)", at the east end of the North aisle of the choir of St. Mary Redcliffe Church, was erected on his order. The monument comprises a beautiful heavily canopied double altar-tomb standing against the north wall of which the westernmost contains the recumbent effigies of a man and his wife, their heads resting upon cushions supported by angels. The man is bare-headed, his hair combed back, and is clad in a sleeveless mantle, from which emerge the arms and cuff of an undergown, a scarf hangs from his left shoulders, and a leathern gypciere from his girdle, his feet resting upon a couchant dog. His wife wears a broad fillet across her forehead, her head-dress falling back, a tight-fitting gown with cuffs at the wrists, and a short girdle, her pointed shoes enveloped in the folds of her dress, resting upon two little dogs. On the wall behind the effigies is an heraldic escutcheon displaying the arms of Mede: Gules, a chevron ermine between three trefoils slipped argent, and upon a fillet of brass along its front is an incomplete Latin inscription: ... predicti Thoma(e) Mede, ac ter maioris istius villae Bristolliae, qui ob(ii)t 20 die mensis Decembris Anno D(omi)ni 1475 quoram animabus propicietur Deus, Amen ("... of the foresaid Thomas Mede and thrice Mayor of this town of Bristol, who died on the 20th day of the month of December in the year of our Lord 1475, on the souls of whom may God look upon favourably, Amen"). It is reasonable to suppose that the missing word before "predicti" may have been filius ("son") or frater ("brother"). The other compartment remains empty, but has the monumental brass of his son Richard Mede affixed to the rear wall (see above). Above both compartments is a handsome continuous canopy of rich stone carving, supported by demi-angels bearing open books, and wearing upright caps with hexagonal flowers upon their heads. Above them rise crocketed and finialled niches, surmounted by cornice and cresting.

== Mede's Place ==
Mede's Place, the seat of the Mede family in the parish of Wraxall in Somerset, is believed to have been situated on the high ground known as "the bowling green" and would have had a magnificent situation. No trace of it remains today. In 1467 (two years after his daughter's marriage) "Philip Mede of Bristol, merchant" together with his wife Isabel and son Richard, jointly leased Mede's Place to his daughter Isabel and her husband Maurice Berkeley ("Maurice Bercley, Esquire"), for a term of 20 years. The original deed is held in the Berkeley Castle Muniments, and is summarised as: "Philip, Isabel and Richard have leased to Maurice and Isabel the holding in Feylond in the parish of Wroxsale called Medeisplace; for a term of 20 years, rent 45s. 8d. a year. Witnesses: Richard Arthur, Esquire, Ralph Percevale, Thomas Feylond". Soon after the death of Lady Berkeley (née Isabel Mede) in 1516, Mede's Place appears to have been acquired by the Morgan family, lords of the manor of Easton in Gordano, as Thomas Morgan "of Feilond", by his will dated 1567, bequeaths to Edmund Morgan, his eldest son, "the house of Feilonde called Medes Court".

== Sources ==
- Master, George Streynsham, Collections for a Parochial History of Wraxall, 1900, pp. 58–64, "Family of Mede"
