= Humphrey Hooke =

English politician

Humphrey Hooke (1580 – c. 1658) was an English politician who sat in the House of Commons from 1640 to 1642. He supported the Royalist cause in the English Civil War.

Hooke was born in Chichester and became an alderman of Bristol. He was Sheriff of Bristol in 1614, and Mayor in 1629.

In April 1640, Hooke was elected Member of Parliament for Bristol in the Short Parliament. He was re-elected MP for Bristol for the Long Parliament in November 1640, but was expelled as a monopolist on 12 May 1642. He was mayor of Bristol again in 1643 and was a stalwart supporter of the king.

Hooke died in around 1658 when his will was proved. He was the grandfather of Sir Humphrey Hooke later also MP for Bristol, and Abraham Hooke, wealthy slave merchant of Bristol.

Parliament of England
Vacant Parliament suspended since 1629	Member of Parliament for Bristol; 1640–1642; With: John Glanville; Richard Longe	Succeeded by John Glanville; John Tailer
