= James Berkeley, 1st Baron Berkeley =

English peer

James de Berkeley
- Arms of James de Berkeley, 1st Baron of Berkeley
- Born: 1394; Raglan, Monmouthshire, Wales
- Died: 22 October 1463 (Aged Abt. 69); Berkeley Castle, Gloucestershire, England
- Spouses: Daughter of St. John; Daughter of Stafford; Isabel de Mowbray; Joan Talbot
- Issue: Elizabeth de Berkeley; Sir William de Berkeley, Earl of Nottingham; James de Berkeley, Esquire; Alice de Berkeley; Sir Maurice de Berkeley VI, Lord Berkeley; Thomas de Berkeley, Esquire; Isabel de Berkeley
- Father: Sir James de Berkeley
- Mother: Elizabeth Bluet

James Berkeley, 1st Baron Berkeley (c. 1394 – 22 October 1463), also known as "James the Just", was an English peer.

Berkeley was the son of Sir James de Berkeley (d. 1405) and his wife Elizabeth (née Bluet) and by 1410 accepted as heir male to his uncle Thomas de Berkeley, 5th Baron Berkeley. He was involved in a bitter feud with his cousin Elizabeth, daughter of the fifth Baron Berkeley and wife of Richard de Beauchamp, 13th Earl of Warwick over the inheritance of the Berkeley estate.

== Life ==
The Berkeley estate had been entailed in 1349, which meant that on the death of his uncle in 1417 it should have descended to James as heir male, but Thomas had apparently not made this clear to the Beauchamps. The Earl and Countess of Warwick were in Gloucestershire, when her father died, while James was in Dorset. The Warwicks took their opportunity and had Berkeley Castle and its estate granted to three of the earl's retainers, while they tried to establish their right in law. This initial dispute lasted until 1421, when James took legal possession of his inheritance and received his first summons to parliament. The dispute was reopened following Warwick's death in 1439 and was actively pursued by John Talbot, 1st Earl of Shrewsbury and his second wife Margaret, one of Warwick's three daughters and heirs. During the increasingly violent dispute, Margaret captured James's wife Isabel and imprisoned her in Gloucester castle, where she died in September 1452. The following year Shrewsbury was killed in France and was succeeded by Margaret's stepson John Talbot, 2nd Earl of Shrewsbury, who she attempted to disinherit. This led to an agreement between James and Talbot, sealed by the former's marriage to the earl's sister in 1457.

== Marriages and issue ==
In 1410 his uncle agreed in return for £600 that James should marry one of the daughters of John St. John, but it is not known whether such a marriage took place.

In 1414 his uncle similarly agreed for 600 marks that James should marry one of the daughters of Sir Humphrey Stafford of Hooke, Dorset.

In 1423/4 he married Isabel de Mowbray (b. 1396 – d. 29 November 1452), daughter of Thomas Mowbray, 1st Duke of Norfolk and widow of Henry Ferrers, eldest son of William Ferrers, 5th Baron Ferrers of Groby, by whom she had a daughter Elizabeth. James and Isabel had 4 sons and 3 daughters:

- Elizabeth married Thomas Burdet of Arrow, Warwickshire
- Sir William de Berkeley, Earl of Nottingham
- James (d. 1453) was killed at the battle of Castillon.
- Alice married Richard Arthur of Clapton, Somerset.
- Sir Maurice de Berkeley VI, Lord Berkeley
- Thomas (d. 1484) married Margaret, daughter and heiress of Richard Guy of Minsterworth, Gloucestershire and had 4 sons and 3 daughters.
- Isabel married William Trye of Hardwicke, Gloucestershire.

In July 1457 he married Joan, daughter of John Talbot, 1st Earl of Shrewsbury and his first wife Maud Neville. After his death she married Edmund Hungerford.

== Notes ==
Peerage of England
New creation	Baron Berkeley; 1418–1463	Succeeded by William Berkeley
