= Richard Abingdon =

Richard Abingdon may refer to:

- Richard de Abyndon or Abingdon (died 1327), English judge
- Richard Abingdon (MP) (died 1545), Member of Parliament (MP) for Bristol
