= John Tailer =

English Politician

John Tailer (died ca. 1645) was an English politician who sat in the House of Commons from 1642 to 1644. He supported the Royalist side in the English Civil War.

Tailer was Sheriff of Bristol in 1625 and Mayor in 1640. In June 1642, he was elected Member of Parliament for Bristol in the Long Parliament to replace the two members expelled for being monopolists. He supported the King and was disabled from sitting in Parliament on 5 February 1644.

Tailer died before January 1646.

Parliament of England
Preceded by Humphrey Hooke; Richard Longe	Member of Parliament for Bristol; 1642–1644; With: John Glanville	Succeeded by Richard Aldworth; Luke Hodges
