= Roger Turtle =

English politician

Roger Turtle (fl. 1326–1344) was an English politician. He was the member of parliament for Bristol in 1344. He was mayor of Bristol in 1326, 1330, 1332, 1333, 1335, 1340 and 1341.

Parliament of England
Preceded by John de Romney	Mayor of Bristol; 1326	Succeeded by Hugh de Langbridge
Parliament of England
Preceded by John de Axbridge	Mayor of Bristol; 1330	Succeeded by Everard le Frances
Parliament of England
Preceded by Everard le Frances	Mayor of Bristol; 1332	Succeeded by Roger Turtle
Parliament of England
Preceded by Roger Turtle	Mayor of Bristol; 1333	Succeeded by Hugh de Langbridge
Parliament of England
Preceded by Hugh de Langbridge	Mayor of Bristol; 1335	Succeeded by Everard le Frances
Parliament of England
Preceded by Everard le Frances	Mayor of Bristol; 1340	Succeeded by Roger Turtle
Parliament of England
Preceded by Roger Turtle	Mayor of Bristol; 1341	Succeeded by Robert Wrington
Parliament of England
Preceded by Robert Guyene with Philip de Toryton	Member of Parliament for Bristol; 1344; With: John de Horncastle	Succeeded by John de Wycoumbe with John Neel
