= Robert Elyot (MP) =

English politician

Robert Elyot (by 1500 – 1545), of Bristol, was an English politician.

He was elected Sheriff of Bristol for 1521–22 and mayor of Bristol for 1540–41. He was constable of the staple for 1541-42 and auditor, chamberlain's accts. 1541–4.
