= Robert Lyne =

Welsh field hockey player (1885–1957)

Personal information
- Born: 2 April 1885 Newport, Wales
- Died: 3 April 1957 (aged 72) Clifton, England

Sport
- Sport: Field hockey
Senior career
Years	Team	Caps	Goals
1908	Newport	-	-
National team
Years	Team	Caps	Goals
1908	Wales		-
Medal record
Representing Great BritainWales
Olympic Games
Bronze medal – third place	1908 London	Team

Robert Francis Lyne OBE (2 April 1885 – 13 April 1957) was a field hockey player from Wales, who competed in the 1908 Summer Olympics and won the bronze medal as a member of the Welsh team.

== Biography ==
Lyne, born in Newport, was educated at Cranbrook School.

With only six teams participating in the field hockey tournament at the 1908 Olympic Games in London, he represented Wales under the Great British flag, where the team were awarded a bronze medal despite Wales only playing in and losing one match.

He played for the Bassaleg Hockey Club before joining Newport Hockey Club in 1904, making his debut for Wales in 1906 against England. He served with the 53rd Welsh Division during World War I.

He became a solicitor, and was in partnership with his uncle Horace. He then became a barrister, and in 1935 was appointed Recorder of Hereford.

He was a Citizen councillor in Bristol and Lord Mayor in 1951-52. He was appointed as an Officer of the Order of the British Empire (OBE) in 1950.
