= John le Taverner =

English politician of the mediaeval era

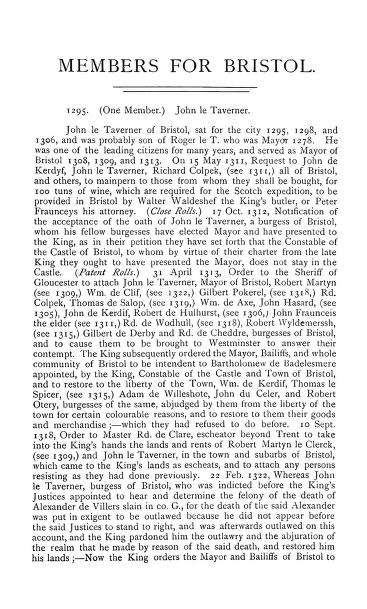
John le Taverner mentioned in the book The parliamentary history of the county of Gloucester by William Retlaw Williams in 1898.

John le Taverner (fl. 1295–1313) was an English politician. He was the member of parliament for Bristol in Edward I's Model Parliament in 1295 and again in 1298 and 1306. He was mayor of Bristol in 1308, 1309 and 1313.

Parliament of England
New title	Member of Parliament for Bristol; 1295	Succeeded by John le Taverner with John de Cheddre
Parliament of England
Preceded by John le Taverner	Member of Parliament for Bristol; 1298; With: John de Cheddre	Succeeded by John de Malmesbury
Parliament of England
Preceded by Thomas Welishote with John Hasard	Member of Parliament for Bristol; 1306; With: Robert de Holhurst	Succeeded by Geoffrey Comper with Nicholas Coker
Parliament of England
Preceded by John Snow	Mayor of Bristol; 1308	Succeeded by John le Taverner
Parliament of England
Preceded by John le Taverner	Mayor of Bristol; 1309	Succeeded by William Randolph
Parliament of England
Preceded by William Hore	Mayor of Bristol; 1313	Succeeded by Raynald de Paines
