= John Knight (died 1718) =

English merchant and politician

Sir John Knight (died February 1718) was an English merchant and politician who sat in the House of Commons from 1689 to 1695.

Knight was the eldest surviving son of John Knight, of St Augustine's Back, Bristol and his first wife called Parsons of Somerset. His father was a sugar refiner and a cousin of Sir John Knight MP for Bristol. He succeeded his father 1678.

Knight was appointed sheriff of Bristol in September 1681, and in this office he persecuted Dissenters, arousing great controversy in the city. He was presented to King Charles II in March at Newmarket and knighted on 12 March 1682. In April 1686 Knight alerted the mayor and the sheriffs of a Catholic meeting, resulting in the arrest of a priest. When the news reached the Catholic King James II's court of Knight's behaviour, he was arrested by late May and had to explain himself before the Privy Council. A writ of habeas corpus failed to release him but a Bristol jury acquitted him in November.

Having stood unsuccessfully at a by-election in December 1685, Knight was elected MP for Bristol in the Convention Parliament in 1689. He disagreed with the Whig doctrine that King James's flight from England had left the throne vacant. He therefore opposed making William III and Mary II monarchs.

In 1693 he opposed the Naturalisation Bill which aimed to grant English citizenship to foreign Protestants resident in England. In a speech against the Bill, Knight said: "Let us first kick the bill out of the House; and then let us kick the foreigners out of the kingdom". Knight's speech was printed as a pamphlet and tens of thousands of copies circulated. But when the House of Commons saw the pamphlet they voted it as "false, scandalous, and seditious" and to be burnt by the hangman. Knight disclaimed all knowledge of the pamphlet.

Knight was called a "violent tory" by Narcissus Luttrell and a "coarse-minded and spiteful Jacobite, who, if he had been an honest man, would have been a nonjuror" by Thomas Babington Macaulay.

Knight married Anne Smith, daughter of Thomas Smith of Long Ashton and had a son and two daughters.
