= John Harris (Bristol) =

English merchant, Baptist and politician

John Harris (c.1725 – 20 May 1801) was an English merchant, Baptist and politician who was Mayor of Bristol in 1790. He played a significant part in the early anti and pro-slavery debates in Bristol.

== Early life and family ==
John Harris was born around 1725. Little is known of his early life. In 1745 he joined Broadmead Baptist Church, was baptised in 1746 and became a deacon in 1760. He was trained as a hosier and built a successful hosiery and linen drapery business but he moved into sugar refinery later in his life. His wife, Sarah, was the cousin of a preacher at Broadmead, Hugh Evans. Together they had 4 sons and 2 daughters.

In 1773 his second son, Francis was apprenticed as a sugar refiner for seven years. This ultimately led to John Harris entering the Sugar refining business himself with his two sons and in 1784 he bought a business in Lewins Mead.

== Early political career ==
On 12 September 1776, John was made Common Councillor and Sheriff. A year later, in this role, he was the recipient of the letter from Edmund Burke on the rights of Americans. It was called " A Letter to John Farr and John Harris, Esqrs. Sheriffs of the City of Bristol on the Affairs of America”. This presented a sympathetic view of the plight of Americans during the early years of the American War of Independence. In 1788 he became a Sheriff of the City of Bristol for the second time.

== Anti-Slavery Campaign ==
Around this time he became involved in the anti-slavery campaign. The first meeting in Bristol was held in January 1788 and with other Aldermen, John Harris was a supporter. The next year, however, he switched sides and was part of an opposing committee that promoted greater regulation for the trade. This highlighted the conflict between his religious and his commercial life.

In 1790 he wound up the sugar refining business with his two sons, John and Francis, but carried on in business with Francis.

== Mayor of Bristol ==
In 1790 he became Mayor of Bristol but this was during a time of great unrest in the city. In July 1791 he wrote to the Government after a letter had been received threatening that 900 mechanics would pull down all the Presbyterian meeting houses in the city. Instructions were sent for detachments of the 3rd Dragoon Guards at Trowbridge and Bradford on Avon to be ready to assist the Bristol magistrates if called upon. In September the troops were stood down after no disturbances arose.

== Later life ==
In 1791, John was president of the Anchor Society, a charitable organisation.

In 1795, John sold the Lewins Mead refinery and went into business with George Daubeny at Halliers Lane

John Harris died on Wednesday 20 May 1801 and was buried at Broadmead Baptist Burial Ground in Redcross Street on 29 May 1801
