= John Glanville =

English politician (1586–1661)

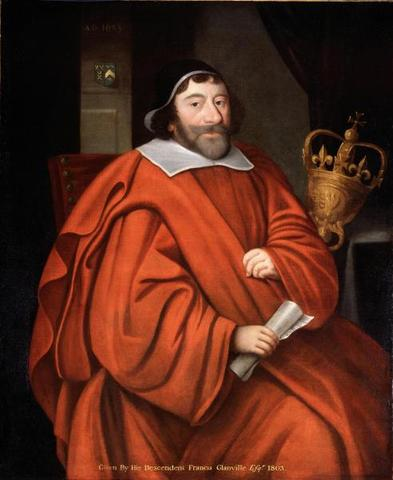
Sir John Glanville

Sir John Glanville the younger (1586 – 2 October 1661), was an English politician who sat in the House of Commons at various times between 1614 and 1644. He was Speaker of the English House of Commons during the Short Parliament. He supported the Royalist cause in the English Civil War.

== Life ==
Glanville was the son of Sir John Glanville the Elder, of Broad Hinton in Wiltshire. His father was a judge and Member of Parliament. Glanville was brought up as an attorney, but entered Lincoln's Inn and was called to the bar on 6 February 1610. He was Recorder of Plymouth from 1614. He was elected Member of Parliament for Liskeard in 1614. In 1621 he was elected MP for Plymouth and was re-elected in 1624. He was secretary to the Lord Admiral of the Fleet during the George Villiers, 1st Duke of Buckingham's assault on Cádiz in 1625, and managed several of the articles of his impeachment over the next three years. He was re-elected MP for Plymouth in 1625 and opposed the Crown in the 1620s, preparing a protest against the dissolution of Parliament in 1625. He was re-elected MP for Plymouth in 1626 and 1628, and sat until 1629 when King Charles decided to rule without parliament for eleven years. At some time he was proctor for the dean and chapter of Windsor.

In January 1630, Glanville became a reader of his Inn. He became serjeant-at-law on 20 May 1637 and bencher of his Inn on 14 June 1637. He was Recorder of Bristol from 1638. In April 1640 he was elected MP for Bristol in the Short Parliament when he served Speaker. He spoke so strongly against ship money during his term as Speaker that the court party contrived to prevent him coming down to the House on the day the Short Parliament was dissolved. Nevertheless, he became King's Serjeant on 6 July 1640 and from then onwards he supported the King. In November 1640, he was re-elected MP for Bristol for the Long Parliament. He was knighted on 7 August 1641.

He sat in the King's Parliament at Oxford and was awarded DCL from the University of Oxford on 31 January 1644. In January or September 1644, he was disabled from sitting in parliament. He was also replaced as recorder of Bristol by Edmund Prideaux. In 1645, he was imprisoned by Parliament in the Tower of London until he was released on 7 July 1648. He was fined £2,320 for his support for the King. In 1659, he was elected MP for St Germans in the Third Protectorate Parliament but was disqualified.

Following the Restoration, Glanville was reappointed King's Serjeant on 6 June 1660.

== Marriage and issue ==
Glanville married Winifred Bourchier, daughter of William Bourchier of Barnsley, Gloucestershire in about 1613. He had four children:

- Francis Glanville, a Royalist soldier in the English Civil War. Colonel Francis Glanville was killed in 1645 when a Parliamentarian force besieged the Royalist-held town of Bridgwater in Somerset. His monument in the church at Broad Hinton is a standing alabaster statue, wearing armour and holding the metal staff of a standard; his real armour is displayed above the monument.
- William Glanville, heir to his father, who was MP for Camelford (died 1680)
- Julius Glanville
- Mary Edgecumbe, who married Piers Edgecumbe in 1636.

== Sources ==
- Baggs, A.P.; Crittall, Elizabeth; Freeman, Jane; Stevenson, Janet H (1983). Crowley, D.A. (ed.). "Victoria County History: Wiltshire: Vol 12 pp. 105–119 – Parishes: Broad Hinton". British History Online. University of London.
- Pevsner, Nikolaus; Cherry, Bridget (revision) (1975). The Buildings of England: Wiltshire. Harmondsworth: Penguin Books. pp. 146–147. ISBN 0140710264.

Parliament of England
Preceded by Sir William Killigrew; Reginald Nicholas	Member of Parliament for Liskeard; 1614; With: Richard Connock	Succeeded by Sir Edward Coke; Nicholas Hele
Preceded by William Strode; James Bagg	Member of Parliament for Plymouth; 1621–1629; With: Thomas Sherville	Parliament suspended until 1640
Vacant Parliament suspended since 1629	Member of Parliament for Bristol; 1640; With: Humphrey Hooke	Succeeded by Humphrey Hooke; Richard Longe
Preceded by Humphrey Hooke; Richard Longe	Member of Parliament for Bristol; 1642–1644; With: John Tailer	Succeeded by Richard Aldworth; Luke Hodges
Political offices
Preceded by Sir John Finch	Speaker of the House of Commons; 1640	Succeeded by William Lenthall
