= Joseph Jackson (Bristol MP) =

English politician

Joseph Jackson was an English politician who sat in the House of Commons in 1659.

Jackson was an alderman of Bristol and was Sheriff of Bristol in 1642 and Mayor in 1651. In 1655 he was made a Military Commissioner for Bristol on 14 March and added to the Trade Committee and made one of the Trade and Navigation Committee on 1 November. In 1659, he was elected Member of Parliament for Bristol in the Third Protectorate Parliament. He was Military Commissioner again in 1659.

Jackson was probably the younger brother of Miles Jackson.

Parliament of England
Preceded by Robert Aldworth; Miles Jackson	Member of Parliament for Bristol; 1659; With: Robert Aldworth	Succeeded by Not represented in Restored Rump
