= Eva Fitzharding =

Monastic patron (d. c.1173)

Eva fitz Harding
- Died: 12 March, c. 1173
- Spouse: Robert Fitzharding
- Children: 8

Eva fitz Harding ( – 12 March, c. 1173) was an English monastic patron who, it was claimed, founded a nunnery in Bristol. For hundreds of years, daily prayers were said for her, and every 12 March the abbey would feed fifty poor men. She and her husband were founders of St Augustine's Abbey

== Life ==
Its not known where or when she was born although it was claimed later that she was related to Norman Royalty but this may have just been embellishments to the family history. In 1140 it is believed that she was married to Robert Fitzharding who unusually was an Anglo-Saxon nobleman in Norman Britain.

We do know that in the fifteenth century both Eva and her husband were being creditted as joint founders of the abbey of St Augustine. We also know the day of her death as every 12 March there was a meal organised for fifty poor men to commemorate her death. On every other day of the year the Abbey arranged for prayers to be said for the two of them.

In 1153–54, her husband Robert Fitzharding received a royal charter from King Henry II giving him permission to rebuild Berkeley Castle.

In 1150 and 1170 her husband would prepare charters and she would serve as a witness recorded as "Domina Eva". In 1162 one of her five sons, Henry, became the Archdeacon of Exeter. She also had three daughters. Her husband retired as a canon in the abbey and died there in 1171. His heir was their son Maurice.

It has been claimed that Eva founded a nunnery in Bristol and became its abbess. However evidence says that this facility has not initially a nunnery but a hospital caring for men and women. However the original gathering of women may have been to deliver alms. One source says that they were both buried in the abbey.
