= Luke Hodges =

English politician

Luke Hodges was an English politician who sat in the House of Commons from 1646 to 1653. He supported the Parliamentary cause in the English Civil War.

Hodges was the Sheriff of Bristol in the year 1638. In 1643, he was appointed to the parliamentary committee to assess Bristol and was restored to his position as common councillor for Bristol by the parliament in 1645. In January 1646, he was elected Member of Parliament for Bristol in the Long Parliament and sat until 1653. In 1649 he was one of the members given instructions for the preservation of timber in the Forest of Dean. He became a militia commissioner for Bristol in 1655.

Parliament of England
Preceded by John Glanville; John Tailer	Member of Parliament for Bristol; 1646–1653; With: Richard Aldworth	Succeeded by Not represented in Barebones Parliament
