= Richard Abingdon (MP) =

English politician

- Born: 1491
- Died: 1545 (aged 53–54)
- Occupation: politician

Richard Abingdon (by 1491 – 1545), of Bristol, was an English politician.

He was elected Sheriff of Bristol for 1515–16 and mayor of Bristol for 1525–26 and 1536–37. He was constable of the staple for 1526–27 and 1543–44 and an alderman by 1538 until his death. He was elected a Member of Parliament for Bristol in 1529.

He was married to Isabel and had at least 3 sons.
