= William de Berkeley, 1st Marquess of Berkeley =

English peer

Arms of Berkeley: Gules, a chevron between 10 crosses pattée 6 in chief and 4 in base argent

William de Berkeley, 1st Marquess of Berkeley (1426 – 14 February 1492) was an English peer, given the epithet "The Waste-All" by the family biographer and steward John Smyth of Nibley. He was buried at "St. Augustine's Friars, London" according to one source, but most likely in the Berkeley family foundation of St Augustine's Abbey, Bristol.

== Descent and Marriages ==
William of Berkley was born to James Berkeley, 1st Baron Berkeley, and Lady Isabel Mowbray at Berkeley Castle in Berkeley, Gloucestershire, in 1426. His first marriage was in 1466 to Elizabeth West, daughter of Reginald West, 6th Baron De La Warr, but he obtained a divorce on 20 November 1467. In November 1468, he married Joan Strangeways, daughter of Sir Thomas Strangeways and Lady Katherine Neville. After the death of his second wife, he married Anne Fiennes, sister of Thomas Fiennes, 8th Baron Dacre, in c. 1486.

== Titles ==
William was invested as a knight c. 1438. William assumed the title of Baron Berkeley by writ after the death of his father James Berkeley, 1st Baron Berkeley on 22 October 1463.

He was invested as a Knight Bachelor on 18 April 1475. He was styled as Viscount of Catherlough (now known as County Carlow, Ireland) between 1481 and 10 February 1485.

William was created Viscount Berkeley on 21 April 1481, as a Privy Counsellor (PC) on 5 March 1482/83, and as Earl of Nottingham on 28 June 1483. He assumed the life office of Earl Marshal and Great Marshal of England on 19 February 1485/86. Finally, he was created Marquess of Berkeley on 28 January 1488/89.

== Disinherits brother ==
He had no surviving male issue, thus the marquessate and his other non-inherited titles became extinct on his death, but he had a younger brother, Maurice Berkeley, 3rd Baron Berkeley. He disinherited Maurice, as having brought shame on the noble House of Berkeley by marrying, beneath his status, to Isabel Mead, daughter of Philip Mead of Wraxall, an alderman and mayor of Bristol in 1459, 1462 and 1469.

In order to achieve this, the castle, lands and lordships composing the Barony of Berkeley he settled on King Henry VII and his heirs male, failing which to descend to his own rightful heirs. Thus, in 1553 on the death of King Edward VI, the unmarried grandson of Henry VII, the Berkeley inheritance returned to the family. Therefore, on the death of the 1st Marquis, only the de jure barony title was passed on to his younger brother Maurice, that is to say, he was Baron Berkeley by right, if not actually in possession of the baronial property. The 4th, 5th and 6th barons were also de jure only, with Henry (d. 1613) becoming de facto 7th Baron in 1553.

== Accomplishments ==
On 20 March 1469/70, he was challenged by Thomas Talbot, 2nd Viscount Lisle, to settle the claims to his great-uncle Thomas's estates by combat. Thomas was killed in the combat. The battle, known as the Battle of Nibley Green, is notable for being the last battle fought in England entirely between the private armies of feudal magnates.

== Notes ==
Political offices
Preceded by The Duke of Norfolk	Earl Marshal; 1486–1492	Succeeded by The Duke of York
Peerage of England
New creation	Marquess of Berkeley; 1489–1492	Extinct
New creation	Earl of Nottingham; 4th creation 1483–1492	Extinct
New creation	Viscount Berkeley; 1481–1492	Extinct
Preceded by James Berkeley	Baron Berkeley; 1463–1492	Succeeded by Maurice Berkeley
Peerage of Ireland
New creation	Viscount of Catherlough probably only as style 1481–1485	Extinct
