= Robert Aldworth (MP) =

English politician

Robert Aldworth (c 1624 – 20 March 1676) was an English politician who sat in the House of Commons between 1654 and 1660.

Aldworth was the son of Richard Aldworth of Bristol who was an alderman and MP for Bristol in 1646. He matriculated at Lincoln College, Oxford on 6 July 1638, aged 14. Aldworth was called to the bar at Lincoln's Inn in 1647.

In 1654, Aldworth was elected Member of Parliament for Bristol in the First Protectorate Parliament. He was re-elected MP for Bristol in 1656 and 1659 for the Second and Third Protectorate Parliaments.

In 1660, Aldworth was elected MP for Devizes in the Convention Parliament.

Aldworth was treasurer of Lincoln's Inn in 1674.

Parliament of England
Preceded by Not represented in Barebones Parliament	Member of Parliament for Bristol; 1654–1659; With: Miles Jackson 1654; John Doddridge 1656; Joseph Jackson	Succeeded by Restored Rump parliament
