= Richard Longe =

English Politician

Richard Longe (died 1650) was an English politician who sat in the House of Commons from 1640 to 1642. He supported the Royalist cause in the English Civil War.

Longe was an alderman of Bristol and served as Sheriff of Bristol in 1621 and as Mayor in 1636. In November 1640, Longe was elected Member of Parliament for Bristol in the Long Parliament. He was expelled as a monopolist on 12 May 1642. In 1646 he entered his name as a petitioner to compound for delinquency, and paid a fine of £800 in May 1650.

Longe died by 29 June 1650 and left land to fund clothing for poor men in the Merchat's Almshouses and for bread for the poor.

Parliament of England
Preceded by Humphrey Hooke; John Glanville	Member of Parliament for Bristol; 1640–1642; With: Humphrey Hooke	Succeeded by John Glanville; John Tailer
