= Citizen Party (Bristol) =

Former political party in Bristol, England

The Citizen Party was a municipal political party in Bristol, England, which existed from 1925 to 1974.

In the 1920s, the Labour Party made extensive gains in local government elections, and in many cities the Conservative and Liberal parties united at a local level to oppose Labour. In Bristol, these parties joined together and called themselves the Citizen Party. By 1936, some Liberals in Bristol had begun contesting local elections again under their own name.

Towards the end of its existence, the Citizen Party was largely a Conservative-dominated organisation. At the local government reorganisation of 1974, the Citizen Party was disbanded and Conservatives began contesting elections again under their own name. As of 2018, only one sitting Bristol City Councillor was originally elected under the Citizen label - Cllr. Peter Abraham of Stoke Bishop ward.
