= Abraham Hooke =

English slave trader

Abraham Hooke (d. 1731) was a wealthy slave merchant from Bristol who participated in the Transatlantic Slave Trade from 1703 to 1731.

== Personal life ==
Abraham Hooke was born in Bristol in mid-17th century. His father, John, was a brewer: this gave him the right to claim burgess status, which was granted in 1690. At this time, his trade was listed as 'mariner'. Hooke married three times: to Sarah Pope in 1686; to Elizabeth Philips in 1690; and to Hester Davis in 1705. He had at least four children with his second wife Elizabeth, though only one, Anne, lived to adulthood.

Hooke joined the Society of Merchant Ventures in 1691 and was made a Warden of the society in 1702. He retained this position in 1703, the year of his first documented slave trade. In 1706, Hooke was made sheriff of Bristol and in 1711, with help from Nathaniel Wade (a conspirator in the assassination attempt against King Charles II of England), he helped fund a bridge in Bristol over the River Frome, which subsequently became known as 'Traitors Bridge'. Hooke was made Master of the Society of Merchant Venturers in 1712, and was part of the group of men from this society that inherited land and property from Edward Colston in 1721. In 1722, Hooke co-founded Stokes Croft Endowed School, one of the oldest endowed schools in Bristol. Abraham Hooke died in August 1731 and was buried in St James Churchyard, Bristol.

== Transatlantic Slave Trade ==
=== Pickups ===
Abraham Hooke's ships often sailed to the Bight of Biafra which is in the Gulf of Guinea. The merchant and his company sent the ships Anna and Sarah, Rebecca and the Tiverton to the Bight of Biafra and the Gulf of Guinea Islands. Another popular place his ships travelled to was Gambia. The Gambia was one of the most popular places for merchants like Hooke to acquire their human cargo because of its geographical locale and proximity to Bristol and the New World. Shorter distances travelled aboard these sailing vessels meant fewer deaths among the slaves during the middle passage. Because of this, however, Gambian slaves were more expensive. Thus slave merchants such as Abraham Hooke were often willing to travel further along the coast of West Africa, places like the Bight of Biafra, to purchase slaves for less money.

=== Drop offs ===
Abraham Hooke's slave ships dropped off most of his human cargo in the Caribbean, in places like Jamaica. Hooke's merchant ships dropped off slaves to feed the islands demand for labour, sugar being plantation owner's main cash crop. During that time, Jamaica was under English rule and Jamaican elites were financially bound to England. Because of the ties between Jamaica and England, Hooke, as well as other merchants, dropped off many of their slaves in Jamaica. Hooke's captains also sold slaves in Barbados to owners of the numerous sugar plantations, helping to create one of the most profitable sugar plantation systems in the world.

== Personal ventures ==
Hooke's own ventures in slave-trading began in 1703, when the Cowslip brought 128 African slaves to Jamaica. There was a decade hiatus before he continued to traffic humans, having regular ventures from 1713 all the way to 1729. There was another hiatus, ending in 1736 when the Betty Snow brought 400 slaves (the largest haul in a single voyage funded by Hooke) to be sold in Virginia. In total, Hooke would engage in the transport of 5,976 Africans to be sold into slavery over the course of 27 known voyages, 4,828 of whom would survive the Trans-Atlantic crossing. This means the fatality rate aboard his ships was 19.3%, a fair amount greater than the average of 15% during the early eighteenth century.

Oftentimes, once the ships had unloaded their human cargo, they would load up on a product in the New World to be sold in the Old. In particular, Hooke's ships transported a notable amount of redwood, with some “Guinea grains” being imported in his earlier voyages.
