= Richard Aldworth (Parliamentarian) =

English Politician

Richard Aldworth was an English politician who sat in the House of Commons from 1646 to 1653. He supported the Parliamentary cause in the English Civil War.

Aldworth was an alderman of Bristol. He was Sheriff of Bristol in 1627 and Mayor in 1642. In 1643 he was appointed one of the parliamentary committee to assess Bristol and was restored to his position as alderman by parliament in 1645.

In January 1646, he was elected Member of Parliament for Bristol in the Long Parliament and sat until 1653. In 1649 he was one of the members given instructions for the preservation of timber in the Forest of Dean. He was a militia commissioner for Bristol in 1655.

Aldworth married Mary Doughty, daughter of Bristol mayor and parliamentarian John Doughty, and was the father of, among others, Robert Aldworth later MP for Bristol.

Parliament of England
Preceded by John Glanville; John Tailer	Member of Parliament for Bristol; 1646–1653; With: Luke Hodges	Succeeded by Not represented in Barebones Parliament
