= Miles Jackson =

English politician

Miles Jackson was an English politician who sat in the House of Commons in 1654 and 1656.

Jackson was an alderman of Bristol and served as Sheriff of Bristol in 1631 and as Mayor in 1649. In April 1654, Jackson was elected Member of Parliament for Bristol in the First Protectorate Parliament. Some of the free burgesses petitioned against his return alleging he took the King's protestation and raised money for the king, but the sheriff and others dismissed these parliamentary nominees as "horse-stealers". Jackson was appointed Military Commissioner for Bristol in 1655. Jackson was returned for Bristol again in 1656 as replacement for John Dodderidge who chose to sit instead for Devon. He was military commissioner for Bristol again in 1659.

Jackson left a garden for charitable uses to pay for bread for the poor.

Parliament of England
Preceded by Not represented in Barebones Parliament	Member of Parliament for Bristol; 1654; With: Robert Aldworth	Succeeded by Robert Aldworth; John Dodderidge
Preceded by Robert Aldworth; John Dodderidge	Member of Parliament for Bristol; 1656; With: Robert Aldworth	Succeeded by Robert Aldworth; Joseph Jackson
