= Berkeley Castle =

Medieval castle in Gloucestershire, England

- Berkeley, Gloucestershire
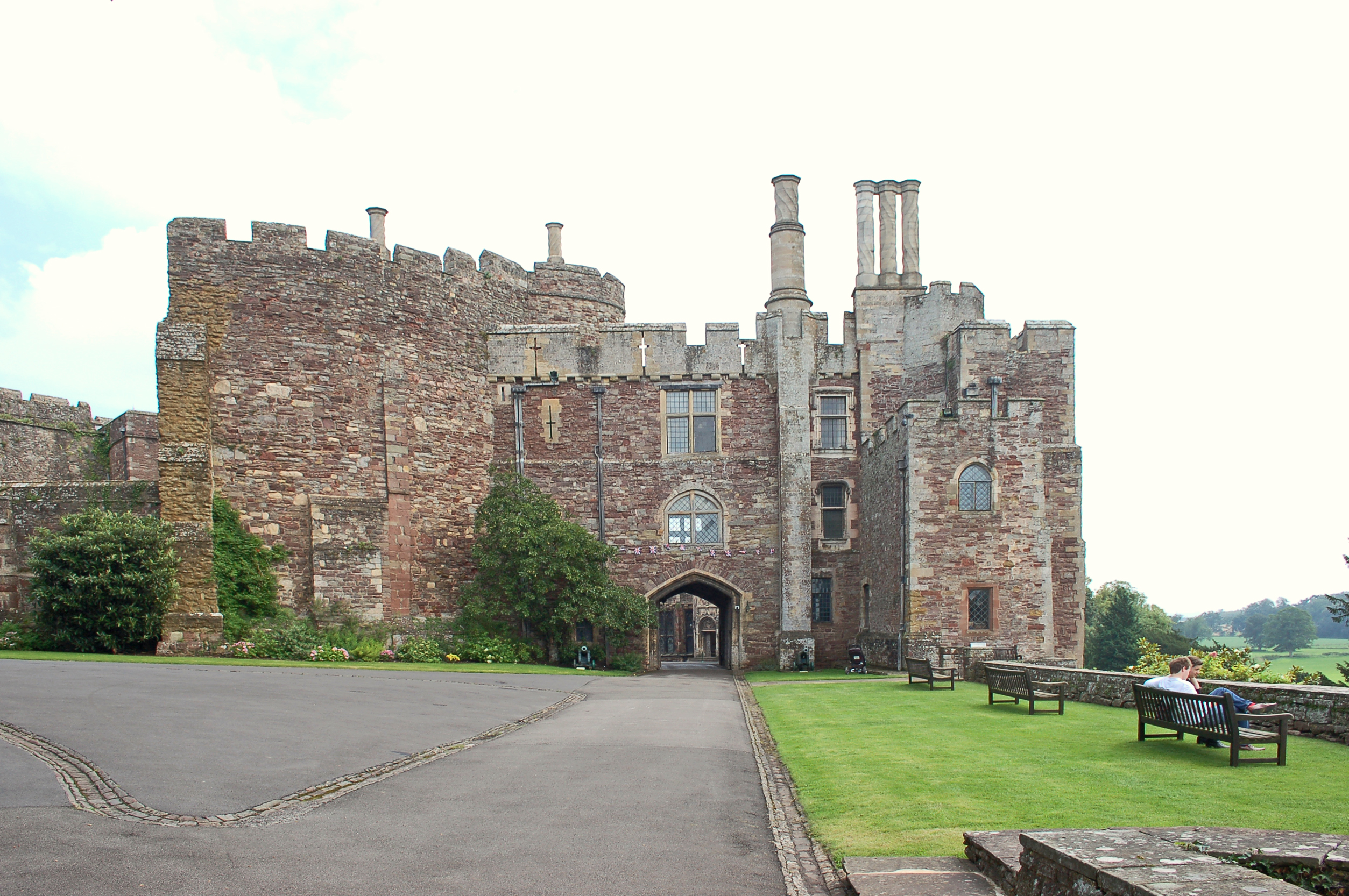
- Entrance front of Berkeley Castle

Location
- Coordinates: 51°41′19″N 02°27′25″W grid reference ST685989

Listed Building – Grade I
- Official name: Berkeley Castle
- Designated: 21 October 1952
- Reference no.: 1340692

Berkeley Castle (/ˈbɑːrkli/ BARK-lee; historically sometimes spelled as Berkley Castle or Barkley Castle) is a castle in the town of Berkeley, Gloucestershire, England. The castle's origins date back to the 11th century and it is a Grade I listed building.

The castle, traditionally believed to have been the scene of the murder of King Edward II in 1327, has remained in the possession of the Berkeley family since they reconstructed it in the 12th century, except for a period of royal ownership under the Tudors.

The Berkeley barony having separated from the earldom in 1882, the 8th and last Earl of Berkeley (1865–1942) bequeathed the ancestral seat to his 13th cousin, Captain Robert Berkeley, of Spetchley Park in Worcestershire (1898–1969), whose grandson, Charles Berkeley (born 1968), High Sheriff of Gloucestershire for 2019/20, inherited the castle and estate from his father, Major John Berkeley (1931–2017).

Since 1956, Berkeley Castle has been open to visitors (for a fee) and remains open from April to November (in 2023) on certain days of the week. The property has also been available for rent for private events.

== Construction ==
The Berkeley coat of arms

The first castle at Berkeley was a motte-and-bailey, built around 1067 by William FitzOsbern shortly after the Norman Conquest. This was subsequently held by three generations of the first Berkeley family, all called Roger de Berkeley, and rebuilt by them in the first half of the 12th century. The last Roger de Berkeley was dispossessed in 1152 for withholding his allegiance from the House of Plantagenet during the conflict of the Anarchy, and the feudal barony of Berkeley was then granted to Robert Fitzharding, a wealthy burgess of Bristol and supporter of the Plantagenets. He and Eva fitz Harding were the founders of the Berkeley family which still owns the castle.

In 1153–54, Fitzharding received a royal charter from Henry II giving him permission to rebuild the castle. Fitzharding built the circular shell keep between 1153 and 1156, probably on the site of the former motte. The building of the curtain wall followed, probably between 1160 & 1190 by Robert and then by his son Sir Maurice Berkeley.

Much of the rest of Berkeley Castle is 14th century and was built for Thomas de Berkeley, 3rd Baron Berkeley: Thorpe's Tower, to the north of the keep, the inner gatehouse to its southwest, and other buildings of the inner bailey.

== Murder of Edward II ==
Berkeley Castle was ransacked in 1326 by the forces of Hugh Despenser, the favourite of Edward II. Then in 1327, King Edward was deposed by his wife Queen Isabella and her ally Roger Mortimer, and placed in the joint custody of Mortimer's son-in-law, Thomas de Berkeley, and de Berkeley's brother-in-law, John Maltravers. They brought Edward to Berkeley Castle, and held him there for five months from April to September. During that time a band of Edward's supporters attacked, entered the castle and rescued him, only for him to be recaptured soon afterwards. It is possible that his captors then moved him around between several castles to make further rescue more difficult, before returning him to Berkeley in September. Some commentators have claimed that Edward's escape was actually successful, and conjecture someone else was later murdered in his place.

Historical sources record that Edward was murdered there on 21 September 1327. Raphael Holinshed's Chronicles (1587 edition), drawing on earlier sources, describes Edward's murder in detail:

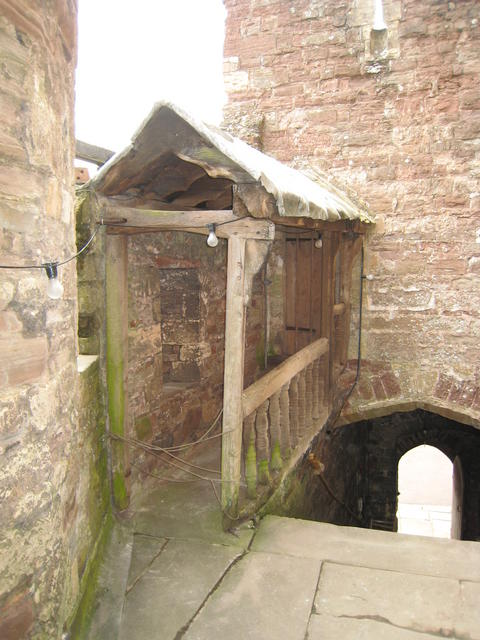
Covered walkway leading to Edward II's supposed cell within Berkeley Castle

they [the murderers] came suddenlie one night into the chamber where he laie in bed fast asléepe, and with heavie featherbeds or a table (as some [sources] write) being cast upon him, they kept him down and withall put into his fundament [i.e., his anus] an horne, and through the same they thrust up into his bodie an hot spit, or (as other [sources] have) through the pipe of a trumpet a plumbers instrument of iron made verie hot, the which passing up into his intrailes, and being rolled to and fro, burnt the same, but so as no appearance of any wound or hurt outwardlie might be once perceived. His crie did moove manie within the castell and towne of Berkley to compassion, plainelie hearing him utter a wailefull noise, as the tormentors were about to murther him, so that diverse [i.e., several] being awakened therewith (as they themselues confessed) praied heartilie to God to receive his soule, when they understood by his crie what the matter ment.

Christopher Marlowe's tragedy Edward II (The troublesome raigne and lamentable death of Edward the second, King of England, first published 1594) depicts the murder at Berkeley Castle, using props mentioned in Holinshed, and popular stories of a red-hot poker or suffocation continue to circulate. The cell where Edward is supposed to have been imprisoned and murdered can still be seen, along with the adjacent 11 m (36 ft) deep dungeon, which supposedly echoes the events of the murder every year on 21 September. Holinshed's account records that, leading up to the murder, Edward's keepers "lodged the miserable prisoner in a chamber ouer a foule filthie dungeon, full of dead carrion, trusting so to make an end of him, with the abhominable stinch thereof: but he bearing it out stronglie, as a man of a tough nature, continued still in life."

The account given to Parliament at the time was that Edward had met with a fatal accident, but Holinshed and other historical sources record that great effort was made to keep the murder secret. The body was embalmed and remained lying in state at Berkeley for a month, in the Chapel of St John within the castle keep, before Thomas de Berkeley escorted it to Gloucester Abbey for burial. Thomas was later charged with being an accessory to the murder, but his defence was that it was carried out by the agents of Roger Mortimer while he was away from the castle, and in 1337 he was cleared of all charges.

== Later history ==
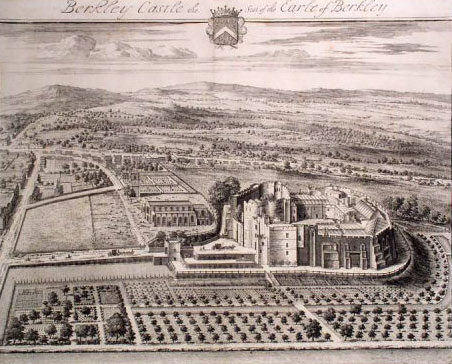
Jan Kip's aerial view of Berkeley Castle engraved for the antiquary Sir Robert Atkyns' The Ancient and Present State of Glostershire, 1712

In 1384 Katharine, Lady Berkeley, founded Katharine Lady Berkeley's School; such colleges were unusual in medieval times and Lady Berkeley was one of the first in England to found a small fully endowed school.

In the 14th century, the Great Hall was given a new roof and it is here the last court jester in England, Dickie Pearce, died after falling from the minstrels' gallery. His tomb is in St Mary's churchyard, adjacent to the castle. Adjoining the Great Hall was the Chapel of St Mary (now the Morning Room) with its painted wooden vaulted ceilings and a biblical passage, written in Norman French.

A dispute about the ownership of Berkeley Castle between Thomas Talbot, 2nd Viscount Lisle, and William Berkeley, 2nd Baron Berkeley, led to the Battle of Nibley Green.

Henry VIII and Anne Boleyn visited Berkeley in August 1535, after staying at Gloucester. In the late 16th century Queen Elizabeth I visited the castle and played bowls on its bowling green.

During the First English Civil War, the castle was held by a Royalist garrison and was captured in 1645 by a Parliamentarian force under Colonel Thomas Rainsborough; after a short siege that saw cannon being fired at point-blank range from the adjacent church roof of Saint Mary the Virgin, the garrison surrendered. As was usual the walls were left breached after this siege, but the Berkeley family were allowed to retain ownership on condition that they never repair the damage to the keep and outer bailey. According to the Pevsner Architectural Guides the breach is partially filled by a subsequent 'modern' rebuild, but this only amounts to a low garden wall, to stop people falling 28 feet from the Keep Garden, the original Castle's "motte".

In the early 18th century the 4th Earl of Berkeley planted a pine that was reputed to have been grown from a cutting taken from a tree at the Battle of Culloden. Between 1748 and 1753 the church tower of St Mary's, Berkeley, was demolished and rebuilt beside the church so that it would not impede the clear line of fire from the castle. In the early 20th century the 8th Earl of Berkeley repaired and remodelled parts of the castle and added a new porch in the same Gothic style as the rest of the building.

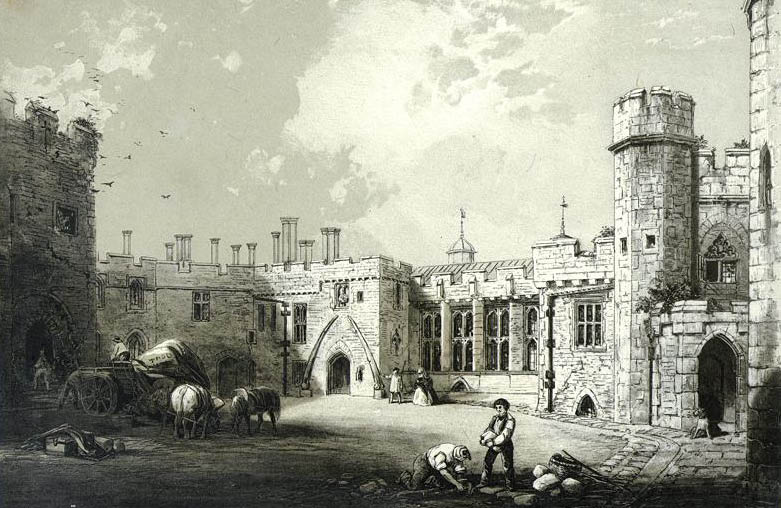
The courtyard of Berkeley Castle in the 1840s

A restoration appeal was launched in 2006 to raise £5.5 million needed to renovate and restore the Norman building. The castle is the third-oldest continuously occupied castle in England, after the royal fortresses of the Tower of London and Windsor Castle, and the oldest to be continuously family-owned and occupied. It contains an antique four-poster bed that has been identified as the piece of furniture remaining longest in continuous use in the Great Britain by the same family.

The Berkeley Castle Charitable Trust received a grant from the Cotswolds LEADER Programme in 2022; the funds were used to help renovate the Education Room.

== In modern culture ==
Berkeley Castle was used for many scenes for the 2003 television film of The Other Boleyn Girl. More recently the castle and grounds have been used for the external shots of the Valencian castle in Galavant. In 2019, the castle – both interior and exterior – was used as a filming location for Season 2 of The Spanish Princess.

The castle is featured in an episode of the 2017 season of the genealogy documentary television series Who Do You Think You Are?, when American actress Courteney Cox learnt of her ancestry. Cox was informed that she is a 21-generation direct descendant of Thomas de Berkeley, 3rd Baron Berkeley and 22-generation descendant of Lord Berkeley's father-in-law, Roger Mortimer, 1st Earl of March, also learning of their parts in the murder of Edward II in 1327. The Castle's website lists additional productions which have completed some filming there.

Two Royal Navy ships have been named Berkeley Castle after the Earls of Berkeley, as was a Great Western Railway 4073 Class steam locomotive.

== Gallery ==
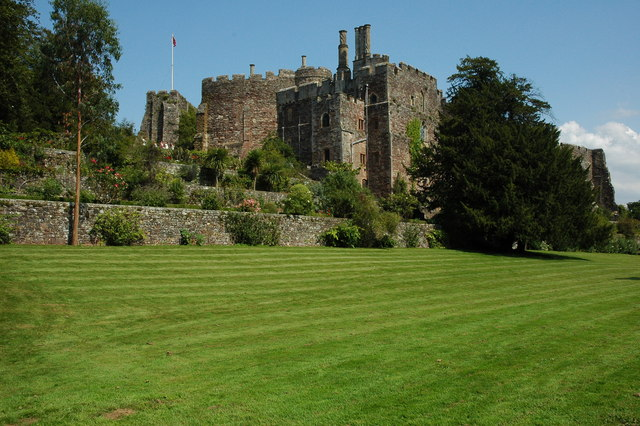
Berkeley Castle viewed from the southwest

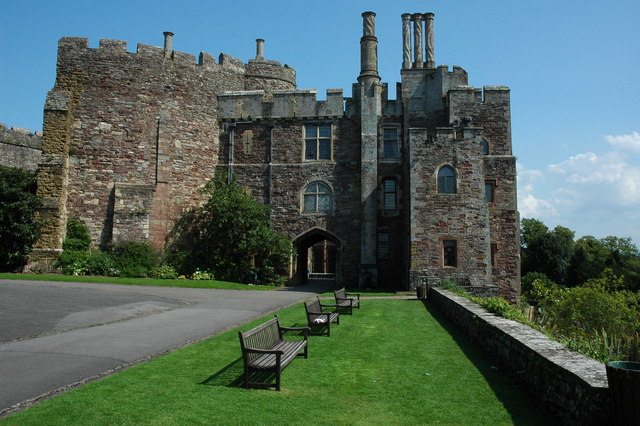
Berkeley Castle's shell keep and inner gatehouse, viewed from the outer bailey

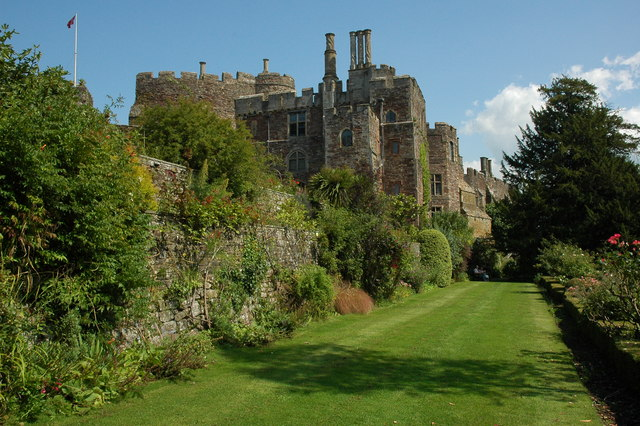
Berkeley Castle's terrace now turfed and planted as a wall garden

== See also ==
- Castles in Great Britain and Ireland
- List of castles in England
- Berkeley Hunt
