= John Knight (died 1683) =

English merchant and politician

Sir John Knight (24 November 1613 – 16 December 1683) was an English merchant and politician who sat in the House of Commons from 1660 to 1681. When mayor of Bristol he became notorious for his activities against Nonconformists.

== Life ==
Knight was born in Bristol the third son of George Knight, a provision merchant of Bristol and his wife and his wife Anne Dyos, daughter of William Dyos. He inherited his father's business in Temple Street, and became one of the most prosperous merchants in the city, and a prominent High Church member of the common council.

In 1660, Knight was elected Member of Parliament for Bristol in the Convention Parliament and was re-elected in 1661 for the Cavalier Parliament. He was knighted on the visit of the King to Bristol on 5 September 1663. He was an alderman from 1662 to 1682, and served as the mayor of Bristol 1663-4; his tenure of office was distinguished by his opposition to Quakers and other religious minorities. He had their houses watched, and took measures with Guy Carleton, bishop of Bristol, for their punishment. Moderates were scandalised by the mayor's rushing out of church for his Sunday recreation of hunting down Quakers, Nonconformists and Catholics. In his time as mayor over 920 people were fined for indulging in liberty of conscience. His intolerance increased over time and in 1669 he denounced the other members of the common council, including his namesake, John Knight who was mayor of Bristol in the following year, as fanatics.

Knight took a prominent part in the reception of Queen Catherine of Braganza in 1677. He was re-elected MP for Bristol in the two elections in 1679 to the First and Second Exclusion Parliaments and lost his seat in 1681.

In 1680, because of poor health, he resigned from the common council. In August 1680 he acted as emissary from William Bedloe, the false witness of the Popish Plot to Chief Justice North. In 1681 he was fined for an assault, and for calling several members of the common council "papists, popish dogs, jesuits, and popish devils".

Knight's grave in Chawton is thought to be by William Bird of Oxford.

Knight married Martha Cole, daughter of Thomas Cole. His cousin's son, also Sir John Knight was also MP for Bristol.
