= Crutchley =

Crutchley is a surname. Notable holders of this surname include:

- Lee Crutchley (born 1981), English author and illustrator
- Bobby Crutchley (born 1970), English field hockey player and coach
- Edward Crutchley (1922–1982), English cricketer
- Ernest Crutchley (1878–1940), British civil servant
- Gerry Crutchley (1890–1969), English cricketer
- Jeremiah Crutchley (1745–1805), English politician
- John Brennan Crutchley (1946–2002), American murderer
- Josh Crutchley (born 1987), British basketball player
- Martha Crutchley (1950–2002), American politician
- Percy Crutchley (1855–1940), English cricketer
- Ron Crutchley (1922–1987), English footballer
- Rosalie Crutchley (1920–1997), English actress
- Sir Victor Crutchley (1893–1986), Royal Navy admiral
