= Newburgh Burroughs =

Irish Anglican priest (died 1798)

Newburgh Burroughs (died 1798) was an eighteenth-century Irish Anglican priest.

Newburgh was the second son of Lewis Burroughs, himself a former Archdeacon of Derry, and was educated at Trinity College, Dublin. He was chaplain to John Sackville, 3rd Duke of Dorset then the incumbent at Bellaghy from 1787 to 1795. Burroughs was the Archdeacon of Derry from 1795 until his death in 1798.

His brother was the judge and politician Sir William Burroughs, 1st Baronet.
