= Robert Thornton (MP) =

English politician (1759–1826)

Member of Parliament for Bridgwater
- In office 12 July 1785 – 1790 Serving with Alexander Hood, 1st Viscount Bridport
- Preceded by: Anne Poulett
- Succeeded by: Vere Poulett

Member of Parliament for Colchester
- In office 1790 – March 1817 Serving with Sir George Duckett, 1st Baronet, John Pennington, 1st Baron Muncaster, John Denison, William Tufnell, Richard Hart Davis, Hart Davis
- Preceded by: Sir Robert Smyth, 5th Baronet
- Succeeded by: Sir William Burroughs, 1st Baronet

Personal details
- Born: 9 January 1759
- Died: 16 March 1826 (aged 67)
- Spouse: Marina Thornton (née Eyre)
- Parent: John Thornton (father)

Robert Thornton (9 January 1759 – 16 March 1826) was an English politician, East India Company director and speculator. He left the United Kingdom as a bankrupt in 1814, and did not return.

== Life to 1814 ==
The son of John Thornton, he was the younger brother of Samuel Thornton and elder brother of Henry Thornton, both also Members of Parliament. Like them he lived near Clapham Common and was an abolitionist, but otherwise shared little in the way of the Clapham Sect evangelical views of which Henry was an examplar.

By 1811, Thornton was experiencing money troubles, caused in part by the Continental System trade embargo. That year, he successfully lobbied for a sinecure position, Marshal of the High Court of Admiralty, which was abolished only in the middle of the 19th century.

As East India Deputy Chairman in 1812, and then Chairman in 1813, Thornton had a prominent position at the period of debate ahead of the Debts of East India Company Act 1812 and East India Company Act 1812, with auxiliary legislation. With Lord Liverpool succeeding the assassinated Spencer Perceval during 1812, Thornton and Hugh Inglis led a majority group of the Company's directors prepared to compromise on a vexed issue, access of missionaries to India. They saw reason to blunt attacks from the former EIC official Robert Hobart, 4th Earl of Buckinghamshire. In the other camp were Charles Grant of the Clapham Sect and the Company's counsel Randle Jackson, evangelicals who wished to see curbs on missionary activity lifted, as nonconformists such as Claudius Buchanan demanded. As the details of the EIC charter renewal emerged in 1813, it became apparent that Lord Liverpool's preference for an Anglican establishment in British India and licensing of all missionaries would prevail.

Satirical print from 1813, a group of East India Company directors riding elephants, presumed to include Robert Thornton, are attacked by a buck representing Lord Buckinghamshire

== Bankrupt ==
Thornton announced on 18 August 1814 to the Stock Exchange that he was unable to settle his "differences", in the amount of £45,000. Funds dropped the following day. The circumstances of Thornton's bankruptcy were related in a letter by his sister-in-law Marianne Thornton, wife of Henry Thornton. He wished to withdraw from political life.After successful speculation in an "omnium" stock bundle, with part of his inheritance from his father, he risked more, and ended up after stocks fell owing £45,000.

Thornton's wife Maria, already effectively separated from Robert, did not leave the country with him. She lived out her life from 1815 at 63 Clapham Common Northside, dying in 1843. Hannah More wrote to Marianne Thornton in 1815, referring to a prescient remrk that "she would make a good Martyr".

Having made a distribution of personal goods in settling with some of his creditors, Robert Thornton left for France in autumn 1814. The Hundred Days caused him to move on to America, where he died in New York in 1826.

== In politics ==
Thornton was the member in the House of Commons for Bridgwater from 21 July 1785 till 1790, and then member for Colchester from 1790 till March 1817. He entered the House in 1785 at a by-election caused by the death of Anne Poulett. He stood at Bridgwater as a Pittite and was elected unopposed.

At the 1790 general election, the 4th Earl Poulett having succeeded to the title wished to bring in Vere Poulett and the banker John Langston for Bridgwater, and Thornton had to move on. Standing for Colchester, Thornton approached the Tory party manager John Robinson for support. He was elected at the head of the poll in the two-member constituency. Second was George Jackson in a close contest, with George Tierney third: Thornton's candidacy had disrupted a Whig effort originating with Henry Bate Dudley to elect Tierney in the place of Sir Robert Smyth, 5th Baronet.

Thornton remained at the top of the poll for a further five Colchester elections. In 1796 the Irish peer and fellow abolitionist Baron Muncaster, moving from at the behest of the Earl of Uxbridge, was in second place. In 1802 there was no contest and he was returned with John Denison; in 1806 the Whig William Tufnell came within two votes, ahead of John Prinsep; and in 1807 the Tory Richard Hart Davis took over in second place, a single vote behind Thornton.

In 1812 there was more even contest, with Hart Davis taking over from his father Richard, and a local candidate Daniel Whittle Harvey. Thornton, feeling the financial pinch with less support from the administration, came in second place.

== Family ==
On 12 September 1786, Thornton married Marina Eyre (or Maria). The couple had no children. She was the daughter of Charles Eyre (1732–1794) of Clapham and his wife Hannah Briscoe, daughter of John Briscoe of Goodhurst, Kent. Charles Eyre was appointed King's Printer in 1767, and was High Sheriff of Surrey in 1780; his grandson George Edward Eyre and business partner William Spottiswoode gave their names mid-19th century to the publishers Eyre & Spottiswoode.

== Legacy and associations ==
Thornton's library at his London house, 6 Grafton Street, and his taste for elaborate extra-illustration, drew much comment. It was sold by auction in Bristol, with manuscripts and artworks, by Wise & Sons, over 16 days in May 1815.

Orangery at Clapham Common, 2021 photograph

In 1793 Thornton built an orangery on his Clapham Common property. It remains, amid a 1940s housing estate. In 1808 he entertained Queen Charlotte of Mecklenburg-Strelitz and her daughters there for a breakfast. The following year he was induced by the Duke of Cumberland to act as an intermediary with William Wilberforce, at the time when Wilberforce was leading criticism of his elder brother the Duke of York and Albany.

In pursuing his Admiralty Court sinecure in 1811, Thornton appealed to the authority of the Prince Regent, who overuled Charles Philip Yorke the First Lord. Subsequently Thornton was "the Regent’s man", a client of patronage, and was called out by the Whig Thomas Creevey. In February 1812 he supported in parliament a sinecure for Colonel McMahon, Private Secretary to the Prince Regent. Thornton wrote to McMahon in November 1812 on an East India Company matter in which the Prince had an interest, about Lord Moira.
