= Richard Sanderson (MP) =

British merchant, banker and politician

Member of Parliament for Colchester
- In office 27 December 1832 – 31 July 1847 Serving with George Smyth (1835–1847); Daniel Whittle Harvey (1832–1835)
- Preceded by: Daniel Whittle Harvey; William Mayhew
- Succeeded by: George Smyth; Joseph Hardcastle
- In office 20 April 1829 – 6 August 1830 Serving with Daniel Whittle Harvey
- Preceded by: Daniel Whittle Harvey; George Smyth
- Succeeded by: Daniel Whittle Harvey; Andrew Spottiswoode

Personal details
- Born: c. 1784 Near Doncaster, Yorkshire, England
- Died: 28 October 1857 Hazlewood, Hertfordshire, England
- Party: Conservative/Tory
- Spouse: Charlotte Matilda Manners-Sutton (m. 1833)
- Children: Ten, including Thomas Sanderson, 1st Baron Sanderson

Richard Sanderson (baptised 4 January 1784 – 28 October 1857) was a British merchant, banker, and Conservative and Tory politician.

== Early life and family ==
Born near Doncaster, Yorkshire, Sanderson was the son of Thomas Anderson of Armthorpe and Sarah née Cromack, daughter of John Cromack. In 1833, he married Charlotte Matilda Manners-Sutton, daughter of Charles Manners-Sutton, 1st Viscount Canterbury, and they had at least 10 children — six sons, and four daughters, including Thomas Sanderson, 1st Baron Sanderson.

== Business career ==
Early in his adult life, Sanderson became a clerk in London bill-broking firm Richardson, Overend, and Company, where the quaker Samuel Gurney was a partner—which some historians suggest means Sanderson may also have a quaker upbringing. By 1827, Sanderson was operating as a bill broker but at his own business, dominating the London market in the later years of that decade alongside Gurney's business, then renamed Overend, Gurney and Company—both at Lombard Street in London.

In 1837, Sanderson moved his business to King William Street, London; in 1847, that business then had to suspend payment, before being able to trade again in early 1848.

Just two weeks after his death in 1857, the business—then known as Sanderson, Sandeman and Company—failed with debts of £5,299,006.

== Member of parliament ==
Sanderson first became Member of Parliament (MP) for Colchester at a by-election in 1829—held due to the resignation of Sir George Smyth, 6th Baronet. Having cultivated anti-Catholic and Tory relationships, he was put forward by the Colchester corporation to replace Smyth, a fellow Tory. A "token challenge" was put forward to counter Sanderson's bid for the seat, but he won the seat, declaring a desire to promote "the education of the poor" and to "put an end to the traffic in human blood".

Having taken his seat on 28 April 1829, one of his first votes was to block the Radical (MP) Daniel O'Connell from taking his seat in the House of Commons at County Clare without taking the Oath of Supremacy. At a dinner in July of the same year, he lamented that "nothing of great importance" had taken place in the House, but he was prepared to "stand forward in support of those principles which he had publicly avowed".

In 1830, he voted with the government against transferring the electorate of East Retford into the soon-to-be-created constituency of Birmingham; against enfranchising Birmingham, Leeds and Manchester; and against Lord Blandford's parliamentary reform scheme. Despite this, he is not recorded as having spoken during this period, although he petitioned for the abolition of the death penalty for forgery, then voting in that manner in June 1830.

As the 1830 general election approached, Sanderson sought to retain the seat but was forced to pull out at a late stage when his agent was spotted in an act of bribery. At the general election a year later, he again sought to represent the seat, gaining corporation backing, in a bid to prevent the return of reformers. Yet his canvassing was received poorly, with an angry mob forcing his carriage into a pond. Nevertheless, he attended the hustings, promising to accept "the necessity of parliamentary reform", an extension of the franchise to "large and populous places", but still rejected the need to disenfranchise other seats. Regardless, Sanderson polled third and was not elected.

However, Sanderson returned to the seat a year later, at the 1832 general election, securing the most votes, and held it for another 15 years until 1847, when he was ranked third in the poll, losing the election. Within this period, he opposed the Maynooth Grant and repealing the Corn Laws, and married the Commons Speaker's daughter.

== Death ==
Sanderson died in 1857 at Hazlewood in Hertfordshire leaving, via his will, £3,000 to his wife, Charlotte, and dividing the rest of his property among his children.

Parliament of the United Kingdom
Preceded by Daniel Whittle Harvey; George Smyth	Member of Parliament for Colchester; 1829–1830; With: Daniel Whittle Harvey	Succeeded by Daniel Whittle Harvey; Andrew Spottiswoode
Preceded by Daniel Whittle Harvey; William Mayhew	Member of Parliament for Colchester; 1832–1847; With: George Smyth (1835–1847); Daniel Whittle Harvey (1832–1835)	Succeeded by George Smyth; Joseph Hardcastle
