= Coldharbour, Surrey =

Hamlet in Surrey, England

Coordinates: 51°11′07″N 0°21′21″W

Coldharbour
- Village
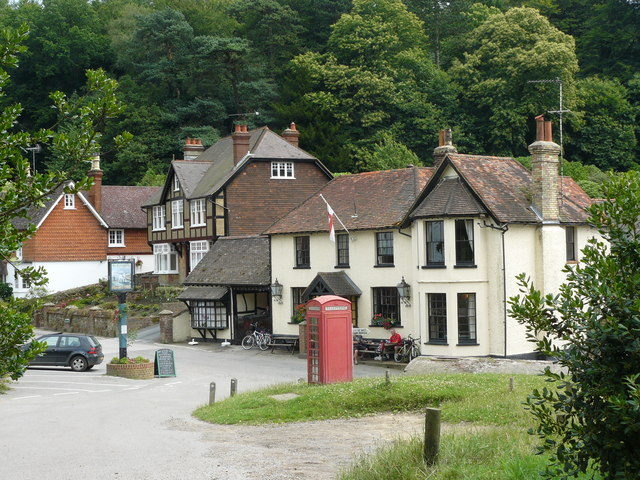
- Coldharbour

- Location within Surrey
- District: Mole Valley
- Shire county: Surrey
- Region: South East
- Country: England
- Sovereign state: United Kingdom
- Police: Surrey
- Fire: Surrey
- Ambulance: South East Coast

Coldharbour is a village in the Mole Valley district, in the English county of Surrey. It is on a minor road from Dorking to Leith Hill Place. It is in the Surrey Hills AONB and is the highest village in the south-east of England.

== Description ==
It has a church and a pub, the Plough Inn. Nearby is Broome Hall House, built around 1830 for the politician and printer Andrew Spottiswoode and later owned in the 1970s by legendary actor, Oliver Reed.

== Notable residents ==
- Virginia McKenna (born 1931), actress
- Karl Pearson (1857–1936), statistician, died in Coldharbour
- Oliver Reed (1938–1999), owner of Broome Hall from 1971–1979
- Chris Lulham (born 2003), racing driver
