= William Spottiswoode =

English mathematician and physicist

William Spottiswoode FRS
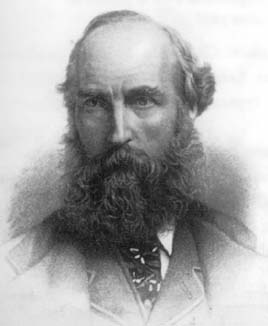
- Born: 11 January 1825; London, England
- Died: 27 June 1883 (aged 58); London, England
- Education: Laleham; Eton College; Harrow School; Balliol College
- Scientific career
- Fields: Mathematics, physics

William H. Spottiswoode FRS (11 January 1825 – 27 June 1883) was an English mathematician, physicist and partner in the printing and publishing firm Eyre & Spottiswoode. He was president of the Royal Society from 1878 to 1883.

== Biography ==
=== Early life ===
Spottiswoode was born in London on 11 January 1825, the son of Andrew Spottiswoode and his wife, Mary Longman. His father was descended from an ancient Scottish family, represented Colchester in parliament for some years, and in 1831 became junior partner in the firm of Eyre & Spottiswoode, printers.

William was educated at Laleham Lea School, Eton College, and Harrow School. He then studied Mathematics and Physics at Balliol College, Oxford. His talent for science showed itself while he was still a schoolboy, and indeed his removal from Eton to Harrow is said to have been occasioned by an accidental explosion which occurred whilst he was performing an experiment for his own amusement. At Harrow he obtained a Lyon scholarship in 1842, and at Oxford in 1845 a first-class in mathematics, in 1846 the junior and in 1847 the senior university mathematical scholarship.

=== Family ===
On 27 November 1861 at Bexley in Kent, he married Elisa ("Lise") Taylor Arbuthnot (1837–1894), daughter of William Urquhart Arbuthnot (son of Sir William Arbuthnot, 1st Baronet).

Their children included William Hugh Spottiswoode (1864–1915) and Cyril Andrew Spottiswoode (1867–1915).

== Career ==
In 1846 he left Oxford to take his father's place in the business, in which he was engaged until his death.

In 1847 Spottiswoode issued five pamphlets entitled Meditationes Analyticae, that explored complex mathematical ideas through analytic methods, particularly focusing on functions and calculus. These pamphlets, among other things, exhibited advanced mathematical analytics and solutions to complex equations that examined the behavior of mathematical functions more deeply and precisely. These were his first publications of original mathematical work. From then on, he published new research almost every year.

In 1856 Spottiswoode travelled in eastern Russia, and in 1860 in Croatia and Hungary; of the former expedition he has left a record, A Tarantasse Journey through Eastern Russia in the Autumn of 1856 (London, 1857).

In 1870 he was elected president of the London Mathematical Society. In 1871 he began to turn his attention to experimental physics, his earlier researches bearing upon the light polarization and his later work upon the electrical discharge in rarefied gases. He wrote a popular treatise on the former subject for the Nature Series in 1874. In 1878 he was elected president of the British Association and in the same year president of the Royal Society, of which he had been a fellow since 1853.

He died in London of typhoid fever on 27 June 1883 and was buried in the south transept of Westminster Abbey.

As a mathematician, he occupied himself with many branches of his favorite science, more especially with higher algebra, including the theory of determinants, with the general calculus of symbols, and with the application of analysis to geometry and mechanics.

The following brief review of his mathematical work is quoted from the obituary notice which appeared in the Proceedings of the Royal Society (xxxviii. 34):

"The interesting series of communications on the contact of curves and surfaces which are contained in the Philosophical Transactions of 1862 and subsequent years would alone account for the high rank he obtained as a mathematician". ... "The mastery which he had obtained over the mathematical symbols was so complete that he never shrank from the use of expressions, however complicated nay, the more complicated they were the more he seemed to revel in them provided they did not sin against the ruling spirit of all his work — symmetry".

"To a mind imbued with the love of mathematical symmetry, the study of determinants had naturally every attraction. In 1851 Mr. Spottiswoode published in the form of a pamphlet an account of some elementary theorems on the subject. This had fallen out of print, permission was sought by the editor of Crelle's Journal to reproduce it in the pages of that journal. Mr. Spottiswoode granted the request and undertook to revise his work. The subject had, however, been so extensively developed in the interim that it proved necessary not merely to revise it but entirely to rewrite the work, which became a memoir of 116 pages. To this, the first elementary treatise on determinants, much of the rapid development of the subject is due. The effect of the study on Mr. Spottiswoode's own methods was most pronounced; there is scarcely a page of his mathematical writings that does not bristle with determinants".

His papers, numbering over 100, were published principally in the Philosophical Transactions, Proceedings of the Royal Society, Quarterly Journal of Mathematics, Proceedings of the London Mathematical Society and Crelle's Journal, and one or two in the Comptes Rendus of the Paris Academy; a list of them, arranged according to the several journals in which they originally appeared, with short notes upon the less familiar memoirs, is given in Nature, xxvii, 599.

== Publications ==
As author
- Elementary Theorems Relating to Determinants. London: Longman, Brown, Green, & Longman. 1851. Retrieved October 22, 2013. OCLC 6652565 (all editions).
1. Via University of Michigan.
2. Google Books (Michigan).
- A Tarantasse Journey Through Eastern Russia in the Autumn of 1856. London: Longman, Brown, Green, & Longman. 1857. Retrieved March 13, 2013. OCLC 2925190 (all editions).
1. Via HathiTrust (Cal Berkeley). Longmans, Brown, Green, Longmans, & Roberts. 1857.
- Lecture I: "Polarised Light". Science Lectures at South Kensington. Vol. 2 (of 2). London: Macmillan & Company. 1879. pp. 1–14. Retrieved August 31, 2023. OCLC 2311950 (all editions) (publication); OCLC 60765129 (all editions) (article).
1. Vol 2. 1879 – via Google Books Harvard.
- "Description of a Large Induction-Coil". The London, Edinburgh, and Dublin Philosophical Magazine. 3 (15): 30–34. January 1877. Retrieved April 20, 2019. LCCN 2003-249007; ISSN 1478-6435 (print), ISSN 1478-6443 (online); OCLC 476300855 (all editions).
1. Via Google Books (Princeton).
- Spottiswoode, William, D.C.L., LL.D., President of the Royal Society (1881). A Lecture on the Electrical Discharge, Its Forms and Its Functions. Delivered before the British Association at York, on 5th September 1881. London: Longmans, Green, and Co. p. 46. OCLC 49580559.
1. Via Google Books (Cornell).
The lecture was also published as two instalments in Nature.
1. Part I (6 October 1881). "The Electrical Discharge, Its Forms and Its Functions". Nature. Vol. 24, no. 623. pp. 546–551 – via Google Books Deutsches Museum.
2. Part II (13 October 1881). "The Electrical Discharge, Its Forms and Its Functions". Nature. Vol. 24, no. 624. pp. 569–573 – via Google Books BSB.
As publisher
- Patents for Inventions. Abridgements of Specifications Relating to Photography. London: Printed by George Edward Eyre (1804–1887) and William Spottiswoode (1825–1883). 1878. OCLC 23009418 (all editions), 1331441231, 86023087, and 1979 Re-Print by Arno Press → LCCN 76-23063; ISBN 0-4050-9626-7, 978-0-4050-9626-6; OCLC 862997550.
(Abridgements = Summaries or Shortened Versions of the Original Patents).
1. Part 1 → 1839–1859.
  1. Internet Archive (Columbia). 1861.
  2. Google Books (Columbia). 1861.
  3. Google Books (Columbia). 1861.
2. Part 2 → 1860–1866 (2nd ed.).
  1. Internet Archive (Columbia). 1872.
  2. Google Books (Columbia). 1872.
  3. Google Books (Columbia). 1872.
3. Part 3 → 1867–1876. 1873.
  1. Via HathiTrust (Michigan). Printed by George E. Eyre and William Spottiswoode.
  2. Internet Archive (Columbia). 1861.
  3. Google Books (Columbia).
  4. Google Books (Columbia).
4. Part 3a → 1877–1883. 1885.
  1. Internet Archive (Columbia). 1861.
  2. Google Books (Columbia).
  3. Google Books (Columbia).

== Gallery ==
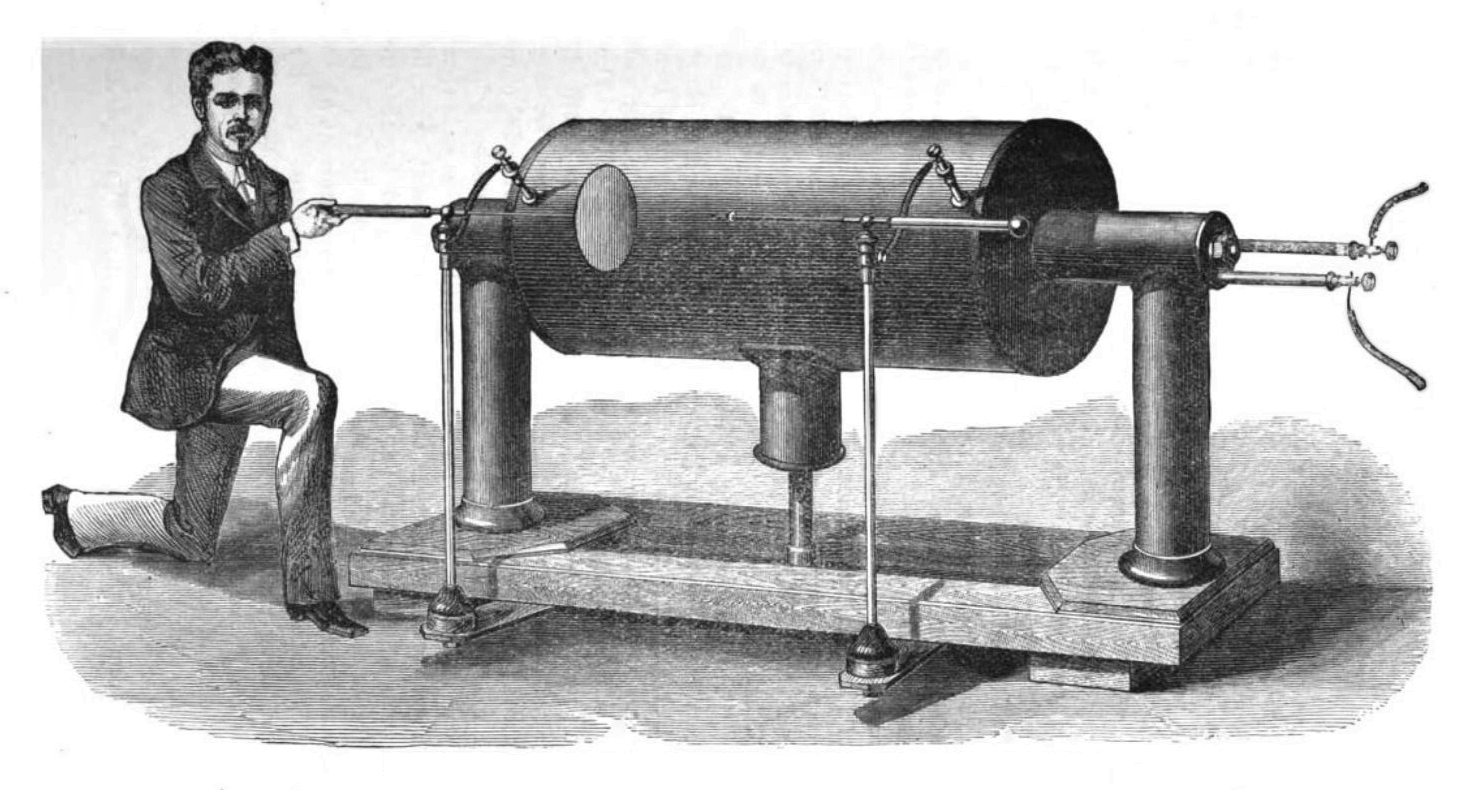
An induction coil built in 1876 by British electrical instrument maker Alfred Apps (1839–1913) for Spottiswoode. Among the largest of its kind, this coil could generate a spark 42 inches (106 cm) long, equating to an approximate voltage of 1.2 million volts. It was powered by 30 quart size liquid batteries and a separate interrupter.

== See also ==
- List of presidents of the Royal Society

Professional and academic associations
Preceded by Joseph Dalton Hooker	33rd President of the Royal Society; 1878–1883	Succeeded by Thomas Henry Huxley

== Bibliography ==
=== References ===
- A.B.K. (18 June 1885). Obituary: "William Spottiswoode". Proceedings of the Royal Society of London. Vol. 38. London: Harrison and Sons. pp. xxxiv–xxxix. Retrieved November 16, 2024.
1. Via Internet Archive (Smithsonian Libraries). 1855.
- Foster, Joseph (1844–1905), ed. (1888). Alumni Oxonienses: The Members of the University of Oxford, 1715–1886; Their Parentage, Birthplace and Year of Birth, With a Record of Their Degrees (Original ed.: 4 Vols.; Later Series, 2 Vols.). Being the Matriculation Register of the University. Oxford and London: Parker & Co. LCCN 07-15031; OCLC 3195599 (all editions) (Vol. 1).
1. See Alumni Oxonienses
2. "Spottiswoode, William". Vol. 4: Original ed. — "Sabin" to "Zouch". 1888. p. 85 [1337].
  1. Via HathiTrust (Oxford). Joseph Foster. 1888.
  2. Via Google Books (Oxford).
3. "Spottiswoode, William". Vol. 4: Later Series — "Sabin" to "Zouch". 1891. p. 85 [1337].
  3. Via Internet Archive (Robarts Library, University of Toronto). Oxford, Parker. 1888.
  4. Via Google Books (Stanford).
- General Index. Deaths Registered in England and Wales. London: Printed by George Edward Eyre (1804–1887) and William Spottiswoode (1825–1883), Printers to the Queen's Most Excellent Majesty. For Her Majesty's Stationery Office. General Register Office — Brydges Powell Henniker (1835–1906), Registrar General (Microfilm: Film No. "95". England No. "51". Civil Registration Death Index, 1837–1915. Office of Population Census & Surveys, Titchfield, Hampshire England. Genealogical Society. Photographer → "L. Hudson". Date → "18 July 1974") – via Ancestry.com. Retrieved January 14, 2008. OCLC 276732822, 220906707, OCLC 223571446 (all editions), OCLC 271864311.
→ Resource Information. 11 December 2024 – via FamilySearch.
1. April, May, and June 1883. "A–Z" (Name → "Spottiswoode, William". Age → "58". District → "St George Hanover Square". Volume → "1a". Page → "303"). p. 298 (print ed.).
  1. Via Ancestry.com. Digital image: 23 (of 32).
  2. Via FamilySearch. No image (transcript only) – via Findmypast.
- Hall, Alfred Rupert (1920–2009) (1966). The Abbey Scientists. London: Roger & Robert Nicholson. p. 58. Retrieved September 21, 2020. OCLC 2553524 (all editions), 5894395595, 1221799850.
- Lee, Sidney, FSA FBA (1859–1926), ed. (1885–1900). Dictionary of National Biography. London: Smith, Elder & Co.
1. Rix, Herbert (1850–1906) (1898). "Spottiswoode, William". Vol. 53: "Smith – Stanger". p. 418.
  1. Via Wikisource (Michigan).
  2. Via Internet Archive (Asafia State Library). 1898.
  3. Via Google Books (Michigan).
- Letters (1877). CLIF (collection): "Papers of W.K. Clifford, 1860s–1970s" A1 (section): "Letters to Family Members". Clifford Collection → Spottiswoode, Cyril Andrew (1867–1915), son of William Spottiswoode. Cambridge: Trinity College. Retrieved March 13, 2014. Re-Retrieved November 13, 2024.
1. CLIF/A2/2 (Item 2): "Letter From W.K. Clifford to Lucy Lane, March 1877?".
2. CLIF/A2/4 (Item 4): "Letter from W.K. Clifford to Lucy Clifford, March 1877?.
- McQuilkin, Albert H., ed. (October 1915). The Inland Printer. Vol. 56, N° 1. Retrieved March 13, 2014. ISSN 0073-8042; OCLC 956742269 (all editions).
1. "William Hugh Spottiswoode". p. 108 – via Google Books (Cal Berkeley).
  See: The Inland Printer.
- O'Connor, John Joseph, PhD (born 1945); Robertson, Edmund Frederick, PhD (born 1943) (February 2005). "William Spottiswoode". Scotland: MacTutor History of Mathematics Archive, University of St Andrews. Retrieved March 13, 2014. OCLC 48076503 (all editions).
- Spottiswoode's Gravestone. "Our History" → "Famous People" → "William Spottiswoode" (image of grave memorial and short commemorative article) – via The Dean and Chapter of the Collegiate Church of St. Peter, Westminster. Retrieved March 13, 2014.
- Who's Who. An Annual Biographical Dictionary. Editors → (i) 1849–1850: Henry Robert Addison (1805–1876); (ii) 1851–1864: Charles Henry Oakes (1810–1864); (iii) 1865–1896: William John Lawson; (iv) 1897–1899: Douglas Brooke Wheelton (1856–1947); (v) 1900–19??: Anonymous. London: Adam and Charles Black. New York: The Macmillan Company. Retrieved March 13, 2014. LCCN 04-16933; ISSN 0083-937X; OCLC 1171380274 (all editions), OCLC 56431030 (all editions).
1. Part II: "Spottiswoode, William Hugh". Vol. 57. 1905. p. 1515.
  See: Who's Who.
  1. Via HathiTrust (NYPL). A. & C. Black etc. 1849.
  2. Via HathiTrust (Michigan). A. & C. Black etc. 1849.
  3. Via Internet Archive (Michigan). 1905.
  4. Via Google Books (Stanford).
  5. Via Google Books (Michigan).
  6. Via Google Books (Michigan).
