= Francis McClean =

Royal Navy officer and Irish engineer

Lieutenant-Colonel Sir Francis McClean AFC DL
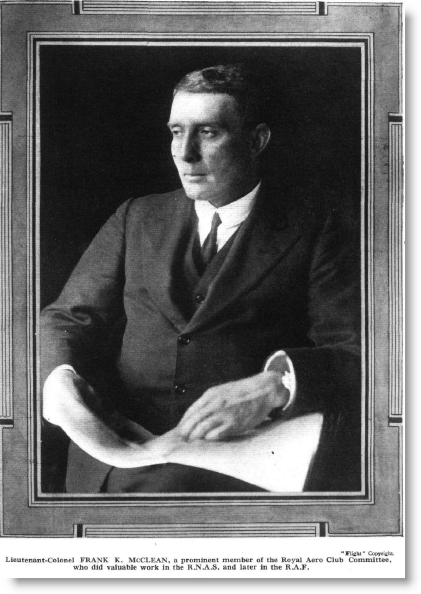
- Lt-Col. Frank McClean in 1919
- Born: Francis Kennedy McClean; 1 February 1876; Westminster, London
- Died: 11 August 1955 (aged 79); London
- Occupation: Civil engineer
- Known for: Pioneer aviator

Lieutenant-Colonel Sir Francis Kennedy McClean, AFC DL (1 February 1876 – 11 August 1955) was a British civil engineer and pioneer aviator.

Sir Francis was one of the founding members of the Royal Aero Club and one of the founders of naval aviation and amateur flying.

== Early life ==
McClean was born on 1 February 1876, the son of astronomer Frank McClean, and was educated at Charterhouse before the Royal Indian Engineering College at Cooper's Hill. His grandfather John Robinson McClean, also a civil engineer, came from Belfast. McClean worked as a civil engineer in the Indian Public Works Department from 1898 to 1902 when he left to focus on aviation matters.

== Interest in astronomy ==
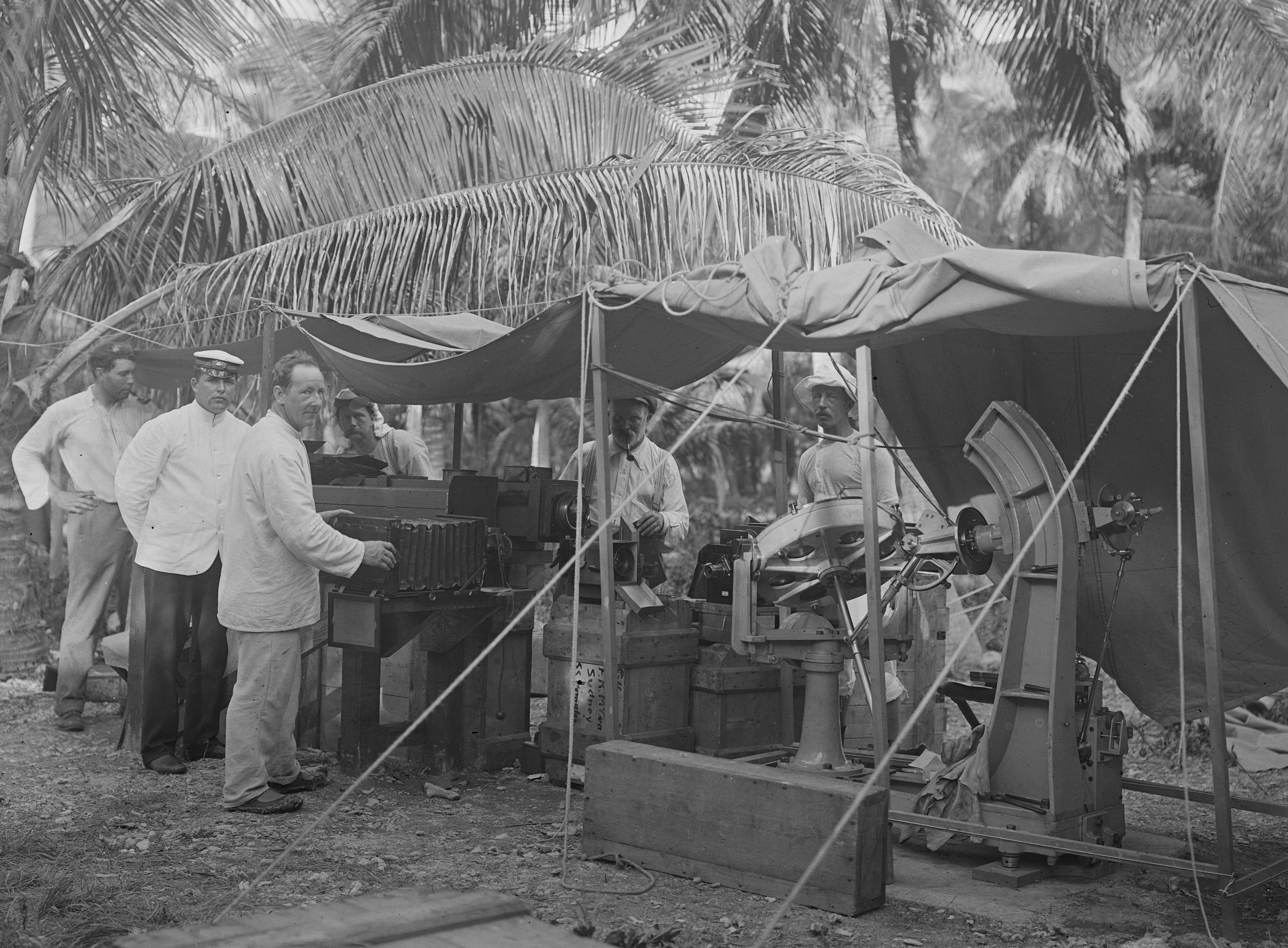
McClean (far left) on Flint Island in 1908 as a part of the 3 January 1908 solar eclipse astronomical expedition

Through his father's influence, McClean was an enthusiastic amateur astronomer and especially interested in solar eclipses. He was a volunteer assistant on the 30 August 1905 solar eclipse expedition to Palma, Majorca. McClean organized 2 astronomical expeditions: one to Flint Island for the 3 January 1908 solar eclipse and the other to Port Davey for the 9 May 1910 solar eclipse; however, bad weather thwarted observations in both expeditions. He also accompanied the expedition organized by Sir Norman Lockyer to Vava'u for the 28 April 1911 solar eclipse. McClean made generous gifts to the Lockyer Observatory.

== Aviator ==
Frank McClean, caricatured 1909

His first flying experience was in 1907 in a balloon race in Berlin, and in December 1908 he flew with Wilbur Wright in Le Mans. At the start of 1909, he began a co-operation with the Short Brothers to develop heavier-than-air aviation in Britain. McLean owned the ground on which the aerodromes at Leysdown and then Eastchurch were built. He was awarded Royal Aero Club Aviators Certificate Number 21 after flying a Short S.27 biplane at Royal Naval Air Station Eastchurch on 20 September 1910. Between 1909 and 1914 he owned sixteen different aircraft, all but one built by Short Brothers.

In February 1911, he offered to let both the Admiralty and War Office use the aircraft and airfield at Eastchurch to teach naval and military personnel to fly heavier-than-air machines. Although the War Office had declined, the Admiralty accepted and started to train the first naval aviators.

McClean was also a pioneer in aerial photography: with the help of Hugh Spottiswoode he took some acclaimed photographs of the wreck of the SS Oceana just off the coast at Eastbourne. In August 1912, he flew a floatplane between the upper and lower parts of Tower Bridge and underneath London Bridge.

In 1914, he made a flight following the course of the Nile between Alexandria and Khartoum in a specially built four-seater aircraft, the Short S.80 The Nile. Beset by mechanical problems, the flight took from 2 January until 22 March. Upon the outbreak of the First World War in August he was commissioned in the Royal Naval Air Service and carried out patrols in the English Channel before becoming chief instructor at Eastchurch. He transferred to the Royal Air Force when it was formed in 1918 but resigned his commission in 1919. McLean was a founder member of the Aero Club of Great Britain (later the Royal Aero Club) and was Chairman in 1923–1924 and again from 1941 to 1944.

McClean served as High Sheriff of Oxfordshire for 1932/33.

== Family and later life ==
McClean married Aileen Wale in 1918 and they had two daughters. Their elder daughter, Frances, married Sir Arthur Eliott of Stobs, 11th Bt, and their younger daughter, Iona, married Peter Carington, 6th Baron Carrington. In 1932, Sir Francis was appointed High Sheriff of Oxfordshire.

He died on 11 August 1955 in London after a long illness. His name is listed on a memorial on the Isle of Sheppey commemorating thirteen pioneer aviators. The family of Sir Francis McClean have loaned his papers to the Fleet Air Arm Museum.

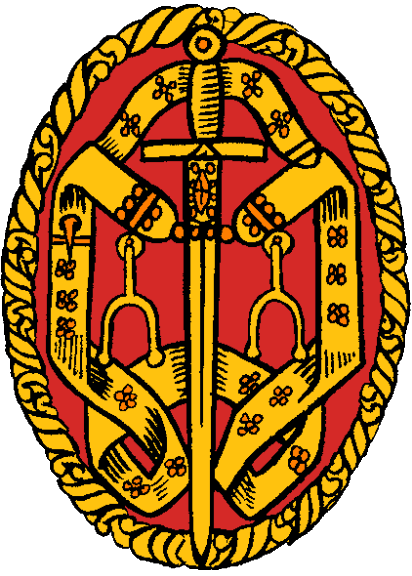
Insignia of a Knight Bachelor

== Honours and awards ==
- 1919 – Air Force Cross;
- 1923 – Gold Medal of the Royal Aero Club.
- 3 July 1926 – King's Birthday Honours: Lieutenant Colonel Francis Kennedy McClean was conferred the honour of a knighthood for services to aviation;
- 1932 – appointed High Sheriff of Oxfordshire.
