= Frank McClean =

British astronomer

Frank McClean FRS, FRAS (13 November 1837 – 8 November 1904) was a British astronomer and pioneer of objective prism spectrography.

== Life ==
His father was the engineer John Robinson McClean. Graduating from Trinity College, Cambridge, in 1859, Frank McClean was a Bachelor Scholar at Trinity for the next three years. As an engineering apprentice to Sir John Hawkshaw from 1859 to 1862, he participated in improvements in the drainage of the Fens. In 1862 he became a partner in the firm of Messrs. McClean and Stileman, eventually retiring in 1870 to work on astronomy and live at Tunbridge Wells, at Ferncliffe with his wife, Ellen (née Greg) and children (three sons and two daughters).

He did important spectrographic work in astronomy, inventing his well-known star-spectroscope in 1875 and observing solar prominences. In 1877 he moved to Rusthall House, Tunbridge Wells, fitted his polar heliostat to the roof of his house, and with a grating spectroscope and electrical equipment began his studies of the solar and metallic spectra. McClean built an observatory and carried out a survey of the brighter stars in the northern hemisphere. After two years' work he finished the northern sky (publishing the spectra of 160 stars in the journal Nature). In the spring of 1897 he went to the Cape of Good Hope to survey the southern stars. In six months he had made photographs of 116 stars in the southern hemisphere. in 1897 he discovered the presence of oxygen in spectrographs from Beta Scorpii, Beta Canis Majoris, Beta Centauri, and Beta Crucis. His spectrographic survey of the stars was cited in the presentation to him of the Gold Medal of the Royal Astronomical Society in 1899. Latterly he also lived at 21 Onslow Square and then 1 Onslow Gardens, London.

He studied history, made a fine collection of ancient coins, and made an outstanding collection of medieval art, books, and manuscripts, especially from Italy and France."

His son Francis McClean became a famous pioneer aviator.

Frank McClean died in Brussels, Belgium, and is buried in Kensal Green Cemetery, London.
