= William Tufnell =

MP for Colchester

Member of Parliament for Colchester
- In office 1806–1807 Serving with Robert Thornton
- Preceded by: John Denison
- Succeeded by: Richard Hart Davis

Personal details
- Died: 26 April 1809
- Party: Whig
- Spouse: Mary (née Carlton)
- Children: 3 (2 sons, 1 daughter)
- Parents: George Tufnell (father); Mary Tufnell (née Farhill) (mother)

William Tufnell (c. 1769 – 26 April 1809) was an abolitionist and Whig MP for Colchester from 1806 till 1807. He was the father of Henry Tufnell, who was also an MP.

== Biography ==
Tufnell was born to the MP George Forster Tufnell and his second wife, Mary. He was educated at St John's College, Cambridge in 1787. Upon the death of his father in 1798, William inherited the manor of Barnesbury (now Barnsbury) in Islington, North London. On 24 May 1804, he married Mary Carleton.

Tufnell ran for MP of Colchester against Thomas Creevey and was elected in 1806. Following the resignation of William Pitt the Younger, Parliament was dissolved in October 1806 leading to a general election in 1807. William did not stand in the general election, instead his brother Colonel John Charles Tufnell stood and was defeated.

William Tufnell died on 26 April 1809.
