= James Beckford Wildman =

English businessman and politician (1789–1867)

James Beckford Wildman (19 October 1789 – 25 May 1867) was an English landowner and Tory politician who served as a Member of Parliament (MP) for Colchester from 1818 to 1826. His properties included plantations in Jamaica and Chilham Castle in Kent, England, which he sold in 1861. The Jamaican plantation, Quebec Estate, was obtained by the Wildman family from William Beckford. Beckford claimed to have been swindled by the Wildmans, who pressured him to sign over the property under threat of calling in outstanding mortgages.

Quebec Estate was one of the largest sugar plantations in Jamaica with well over 800 slaves (the average at that time was 200). The profits from this plantation allowed Thomas Wildman to purchase (and renovate) Newstead Abbey from Lord Byron.

In 1830, Wildman complained to Viscount Goderich about the treatment of one of his slaves, Eleanor James, by the proprietor of an estate called North Hall. (James was flogged for requesting payment for a hog.) In 1840, Joseph John Gurney visited the estate and described the trial of a Myalist that took place there.

Parliament of the United Kingdom
Preceded by Hart Davis; Sir William Burroughs, Bt	Member of Parliament for Colchester; 1818 – 1826; With: Sir William Burroughs, Bt to June 1818; Daniel Whittle Harvey June 1818 – 1820; Henry Baring 1820–26	Succeeded by Daniel Whittle Harvey; Sir George Smyth, Bt
