= Charles Bathurst (MP, born 1754) =

British politician (1754–1831)

The Right Honourable Charles Bathurst

Chancellor of the Duchy of Lancaster
- In office 1812–1823
- Monarchs: George III; George IV
- Prime Minister: The Earl of Liverpool
- Preceded by: The Earl of Buckinghamshire
- Succeeded by: The Lord Bexley

Personal details
- Born: 1754
- Died: 13 August 1831 (aged 76–77)
- Spouse: Charlotte Addington (m. 1781)
- Children: 4, including William
- Education: University of Oxford

Charles Bathurst PC (1754 – 13 August 1831), known as Charles Bragge from 1754 to 1804, was a British politician of the early 19th century.

== Background and education ==
Born Charles Bragge, Bathurst was the son of Charles Bragge, of Cleeve Hill in Gloucestershire, and his wife Anne Bathurst, the granddaughter of Sir Benjamin Bathurst, younger brother of Allen Bathurst, 1st Earl Bathurst. He was educated at Winchester School and New College, Oxford and studied law at Lincoln's Inn in 1772, being called to the bar in 1778. In 1804 he assumed by royal licence the surname of Bathurst in lieu of Bragge when he inherited Lydney Park in Gloucestershire from his maternal uncle Poole Bathurst.

== Political career ==
Bathurst sat as a member of parliament (MP) for Monmouth from 1790 to 1796, for Bristol from 1796 to 1812, for Bodmin from 1812 to 1818 and for Harwich from 1818 to 1823. He was invested a member of the Privy Council in 1801 and held office under Henry Addington as Treasurer of the Navy from 1801 to 1803 and as Secretary at War from 1803 to 1804. He also served under the Duke of Portland as Master of the Mint (1806–07) and under Lord Liverpool as Chancellor of the Duchy of Lancaster (1812–23) and President of the Board of Control (1821–22).

In 1796 Bathurst was made an honorary freeman of the Society of Merchant Venturers, due to his support for the slave trade.

== Family ==
Bathurst died in August 1831. He had married Charlotte, daughter of Anthony Addington, in 1781 and with her had 2 sons and 2 daughters. He was succeeded in turn by their eldest son Charles and their younger son, Reverend William Hiley Bathurst who became the grandfather of Charles Bathurst, 1st Viscount Bledisloe. His wife survived him by eight years and died in May 1839.

Parliament of Great Britain
Preceded by Marquess of Worcester	Member of Parliament for Monmouth; 1790–1796	Succeeded by Sir Charles Thompson, Bt
Preceded by The Lord Sheffield; Marquess of Worcester	Member of Parliament for Bristol; 1796–1800; With: The Lord Sheffield	Succeeded by Parliament of the United Kingdom
Parliament of the United Kingdom
Preceded by Parliament of Great Britain	Member of Parliament for Bristol; 1801–1812; With: The Lord Sheffield to 1802; Evan Baillie from 1802	Succeeded by Evan Baillie; Richard Hart Davis
Preceded by Davies Giddy; Sir William Oglander, Bt	Member of Parliament for Bodmin; 1812–1818; With: Davies Giddy	Succeeded by Davies Giddy; Thomas Bradyll
Preceded by Nicholas Vansittart; John Hiley Addington	Member of Parliament for Harwich; 1818–1823; With: Nicholas Vansittart	Succeeded by George Canning; John Charles Herries
Political offices
Preceded by Hon. Dudley Ryder	Treasurer of the Navy; 1801–1803	Succeeded by George Tierney
Preceded by Charles Philip Yorke	Secretary at War; 1803–1804	Succeeded by William Dundas
Preceded by Lord Charles Spencer	Master of the Mint; 1806–1807	Succeeded by The Earl Bathurst
Preceded by The Earl of Buckinghamshire	Chancellor of the Duchy of Lancaster; 1812–1823	Succeeded by The Lord Bexley
Preceded by George Canning	President of the Board of Control; 1821–1822	Succeeded by Charles Williams-Wynn
