= Hart Davis =

British parliamentarian (1791–1854)

Hart Davis (1791–1854) was a British parliamentarian.

Davis matriculated at Christ Church, Oxford in 1809, and entered Lincoln's Inn in 1810. He was a Member of Parliament (MP) for Colchester from 1812 to 1818.

An interest in science led to him being elected in 1841 as a Fellow of the Royal Society.

Parliament of the United Kingdom
Preceded by Robert Thornton; Richard Hart Davis	Member of Parliament for Colchester; 1812 – 1818; With: Robert Thornton to 1817; Sir William Burroughs, Bt from 1817	Succeeded by Sir William Burroughs, Bt; James Beckford Wildman
