= Andrew Spottiswoode =

British MP (1787–1866)

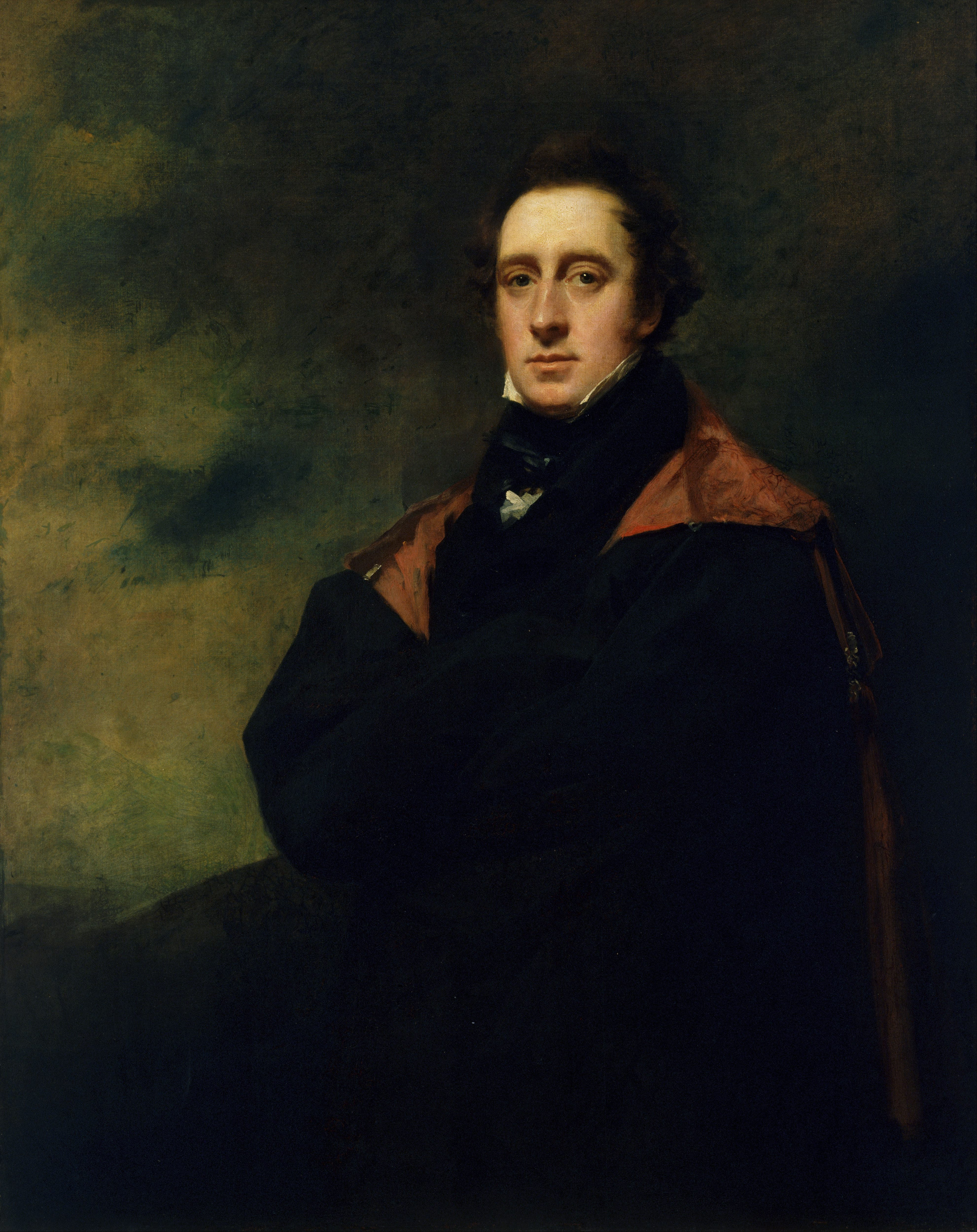
- Portrait of Spottiswoode, by Sir Henry Raeburn, between 1807 and 1823

Member of Parliament for Colchester
- In office 1830–1831 Serving with Daniel Whittle Harvey
- Preceded by: Daniel Whittle Harvey; Richard Sanderson
- Succeeded by: Daniel Whittle Harvey; William Mayhew

Member of Parliament for Saltash
- In office 1826–1830 Serving with Henry Monteith, Colin Macaulay
- Preceded by: William Russell; John Fleming
- Succeeded by: The Earl of Darlington; John Gregson

Personal details
- Born: 19 February 1787 London, England
- Died: 20 February 1866 (aged 79) London, England
- Spouse: Mary Longman (m. 1819; died 1866)
- Relations: William Strahan (grandfather); Andrew Strahan (uncle)
- Children: 5, including William
- Parent(s): John Spottiswoode; Margaret Penelope Strahan
- Education: Edinburgh High School
- Occupation: Printer, publisher, politician

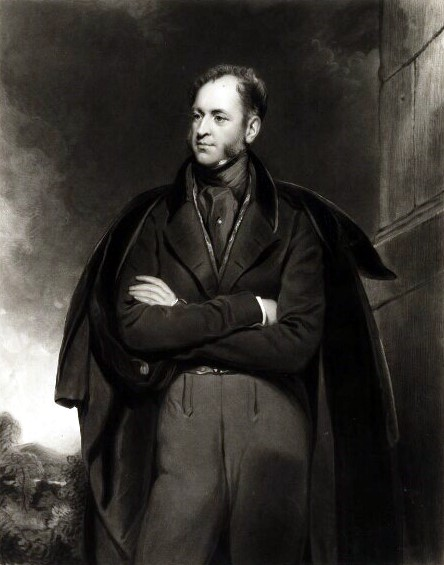
Mezzotint of Spottiswoode, by James Bromley, printed by Lahee & Co, published in 1838 by Thomas Boys, after Thomas Phillips

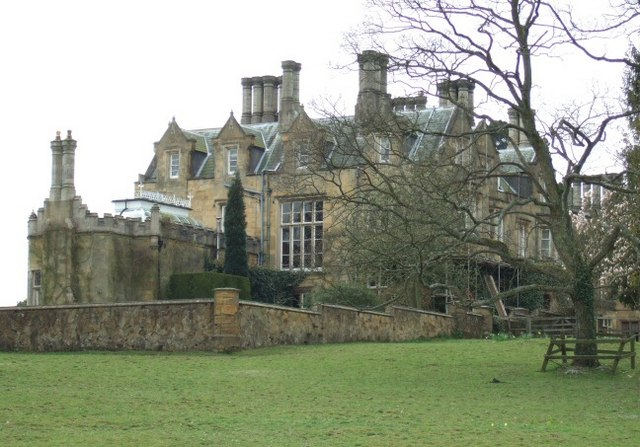
Broome Hall, Surrey

Andrew Spottiswoode (19 February 1787 – 20 February 1866) was a Scottish printer, publisher and politician, MP for Saltash from 1826 to 1830, and Colchester from 1830 to 1831.

== Life ==
Spottiswoode was born in London on 19 February 1787. He was the fourth, but third surviving, son of John Spottiswoode (d. 1805) of Spottiswoode, Berwick, and Margaret Penelope Strahan. Among his siblings was brother, Robert Spottiswoode. On their father's death in 1805, his eldest brother, John Spottiswoode, inherited their father's Scottish estate and property in Tobago.

His paternal grandparents were John Spottiswoode, an eminent advocate and legal author, and Mary (née Thomson) Spottiswoode of Fife. The family descended from John Spottiswoode (1565–1639), Archbishop of St. Andrews and Lord Chancellor of Scotland. His maternal grandparents were the former Margaret Penelope Elphinstone (a daughter of William Elphinstone, an Episcopal clergyman in Edinburgh) and William Strahan, an MP and publisher who was good friends with Benjamin Franklin.

He was educated at Edinburgh High School.

== Career ==
In 1819 Andrew and his brother Robert assumed the management of the printing business of their uncle Andrew Strahan. They brought in steam-powered printing presses. They were also publishers, of works by Henry Fuseli and William Henry Pyne among others, including Anna Eliza Bray's memoir of her husband Charles Alfred Stothard.

=== King's Printer ===
In 1830, Strahan was granted a renewed 30-year patent as King's Printer. It resulted in a successful petition against Spottiswoode's election in Colchester, on the grounds that he was a government contractor. The monopoly it conferred was also contested by Joseph Hume, a Radical colleague of Daniel Whittle Harvey to whom Spottiswoode had come second in Colchester (which elected two members). Hume made allegations about the patent, beginning a period in which the status of the monopoly was brought into play.

Spottiswoode gave evidence on Bible printing costs to a parliamentary committee in 1832, as did David Hunter Blair who had the Scottish patent as King's Printer. A criticism of him by the Baptist minister Thomas Curtis, due to allegations of inaccurate printing, was published in 1833.

=== Political career ===
Spottiswoode was returned unopposed on the Russell interest as a Member of Parliament for Saltash, serving from 1826 to 1830.

At the 1830 general election, he was a candidate for the open borough of Colchester, standing on the Blue interest. Spottiswoode finished second in the poll to Daniel Whittle Harvey, the radical sitting Member, but far ahead of the reformer William Mayhew. After Harvey raised issue with Spottiswoode's role as the King's Printer, Mayhew petitioned against his return, "alleging malpractice by the returning officer and bribery by Spottiswoode, but crucially arguing that his patent as king’s printer disqualified him, as a government contractor." On petition, Spottiswoode's election to Colchester was declared void and a by-election was held where he was succeeded by Mayhew.

== Personal life ==
On 16 March 1819 Spottiswoode was married to Mary Longman (1801–1870), daughter of Thomas Norton Longman, the printer. In London they lived at 9 Bedford Square, and in Surrey, they owned Broome Hall. Together, they had two sons and three daughters, including:

- Rosa Spottiswoode (1821–1898), who lived at Drydown and never married.
- Augusta Spottiswoode (1823–1912), a prominent suffragist.
- William Spottiswoode (1825–1883), the mathematician and physicist; he married Elisa "Lise" Taylor Arbuthnot, a daughter of William Urquhart Arbuthnot (son of Sir William Arbuthnot, 1st Baronet), in 1861.
- George Andrew Spottiswoode (1827–1899), who married Grace Frances Hammick, eldest daughter of the Rev. Sir St Vincent Hammick, 2nd Baronet.

Spottiswoode died at his London home at 12 James Street, Buckingham Gate on 20 February 1866. Following his death, both Rosa and Augusta inherited equal shares in his four life assurance policies and thirteen shares each in the London Gas Light Company.

=== Descendants ===
Through his son William, he was a grandfather of William Hugh Spottiswoode (1864–1915) and Cyril Andrew Spottiswoode (1867–1915).

Through his son George, he was posthumously a grandfather of Capt. John Spottiswoode (1874–1914) of the 6th Battalion, King's Royal Rifle Corps, who was killed in action at Gheluvelt during World War I; he had married Sybil Gwendolen Ginsbury in 1907. His sister, Mabel Spottiswoode, married Robert Stansfield Herries (elder brother of Sir William Herries, both nephews of William Wickham, MP, and grandsons of Henry Lewis Wickham, Receiver General of Gibraltar).
