= Broome Hall =

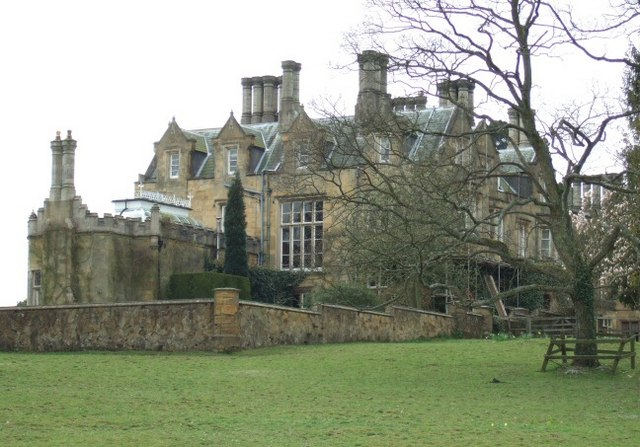
- Broome Hall in 2006

- Location within Surrey
- Etymology: Broom is a generic and specific English term for the genisteae genus of plants and certain species; from this the tool is derived.

General information
- Status: Converted to flats
- Type: Country house and estate
- Classification: Grade II listed
- Location: Near Coldharbour, Surrey, England
- Coordinates: 51.1705°N 0.3557°W
- Completed: c. 1830
- Owner: Andrew Spottiswoode MP; Frederick Pennington MP; Oliver Reed, actor

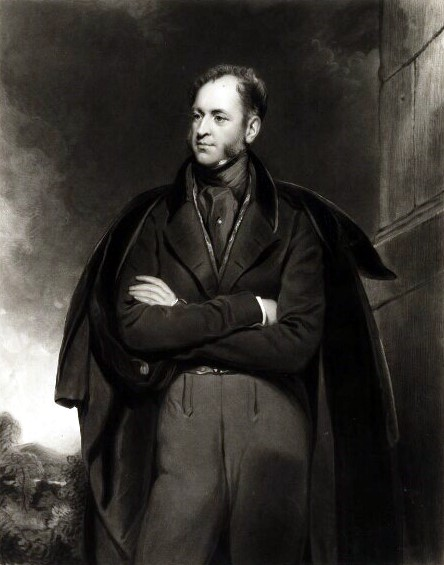
Andrew Spottiswoode (1787-1866), first owner of Broome Hall.

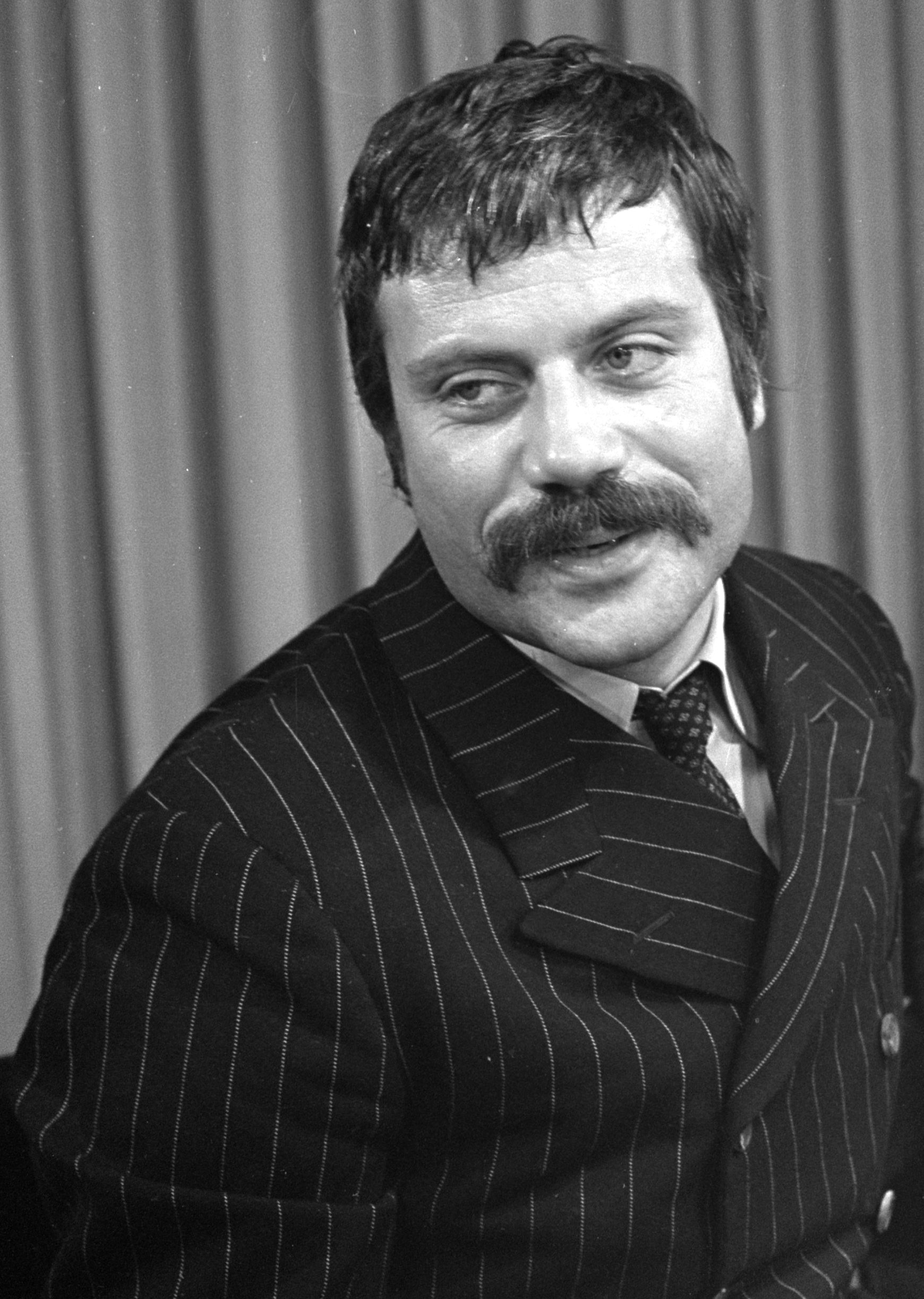
Oliver Reed in 1968, a later owner

Broome Hall is a Grade II-listed country house with grounds including cottages and outhouses on the wooded, upper southern slopes of the Greensand Ridge near Coldharbour in Surrey, England.

It was built around 1830 for the politician and printer Andrew Spottiswoode, and had a succession of similarly wealthy family owners before the main house was converted into eleven flats, each separately owned, in the late 20th century. It was owned, for a number of years in the 1970s, by actor Oliver Reed.

Broom(e) refers to the genus (and specifically several species) of often flowering plants Genisteae (along with gorse, lupins and laburnum). Along with evergreens, broom dominates the sandy soil in the region.

== 19th century ==
The house was built about 1830 for the printer-politician and investor Andrew Spottiswoode, and extended in the late 19th century for Sir Alexander Brown, 1st Baronet. It was also home from 1865 to the international merchant-politician Frederick Pennington (died 1914) and his suffragette wife, Margaret.

== 20th century ==
In the Second World War, it served as headquarters of Canadian forces in Britain. Its gravel drive was reinforced with concrete to withstand the weight of tanks.

In 1954, the White Fathers, Christian missionaries in Africa and an order of monks, bought the property and used it as their British novitiate, for training new monks.

The actor Oliver Reed bought the 56-bedroom property in 1971 and became the so-called "Master of Broome Hall" for eight years. Reed only bought the house because he was looking for a field for a horse he had bought from Johnny Kidd, the father of future supermodel Jodie Kidd, who ran a stud farm in Ewhurst. He then spent a fortune renovating it. The naked wrestling scene with Reed and Alan Bates in Ken Russell's 1969 film Women in Love is said to have been filmed there. Reed was banned from his local pub there for descending a chimney naked and shouting out: "Ho! Ho! Ho! I'm Santa Claus." According to an estate agent's negotiator, Reed buried the jewellery collection of a former girlfriend in the grounds where it still lies.

The house was then bought by a property developer who converted it into flats. It was assessed and recognised as a Grade II-listed building in 1987.
