= George Baillie (merchant) =

Scottish merchant

- Born: 1755
- Died: 1809 (aged 51–52)
- Occupations: Merchant; slave trader; author

George Baillie (1757–1809) was a Scottish merchant, slave-trader and author.

== Family ==
Baillie was the son of William Baillie of Rosehall. He was the cousin of Alexander, Evan and James Baillie, the sons of Hugh Baillie of Dochfour, who were all also active alongside their cousin in the slave trade and ownership of Caribbean plantations.

== Career in the Caribbean ==
Baillie left Scotland aged 14 or 15 arriving in St Kitts in 1770. In 1771 he then moved to St Vincent, then in 1773 he moved to Grenada and the same year back to St Vincent where he worked for the partnership, Garraway and Baillie, of which is cousin Evan was a founder. While returning to Britain due to poor health in 1783, Baillie went back to the St Vincent and worked in partnership with Charles Hamilton from 1784 to c.1787.

While Baillie began his career in the Caribbean with Evan he later began working with Evan's brother James. When James died in 1793, Baillie took over the business importing cotton from the Guyana coast at the beginning of the nineteenth century. Baillie experienced financial collapse around 1805.

== Authorship ==
After the final failures of George Baillie's firm in 1808 he published Interesting Letters addressed to Evan Baillie Esq. of Bristol. Merchant, Member of Parliament for that Great City, and Colonel of the Bristol Volunteers (London, 1809) and Interesting Letters addressed to James Baillie Esq. of Bedford Square, Partner in the House of Baillie, Thornton, and Campbell (London, 1809). These texts provide insight into his business dealings with his family members, and information about slave-trading, slave-ownership and mercantile activity prior to abolition of the slate trade in 1807.
