= James Baillie (merchant) =

British merchant, planter and politician

The Right Honourable James Baillie
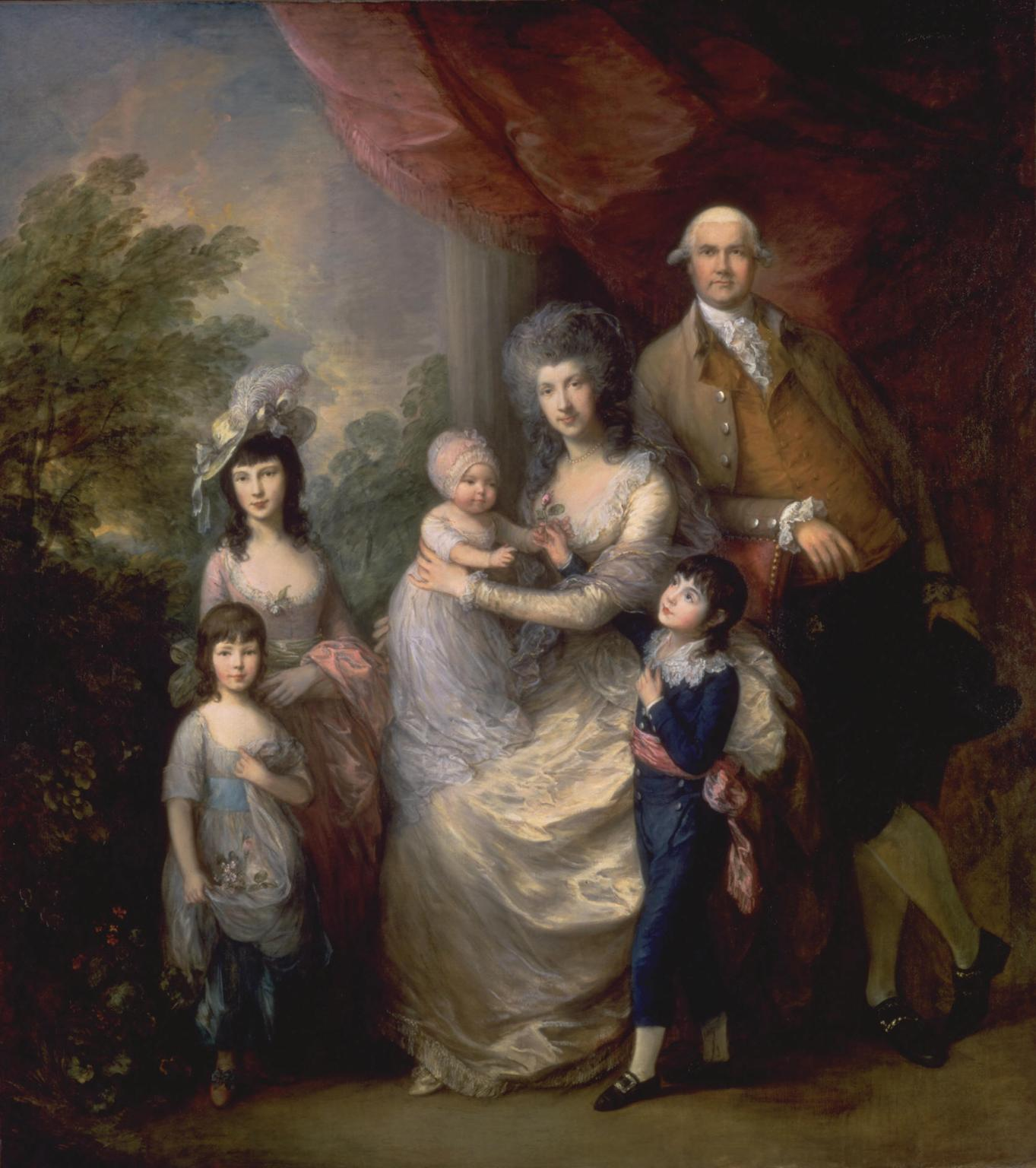
- Portrait of James Baillie (standing, right) with family (Thomas Gainsborough, c.1784)

Member of Parliament for Horsham
- In office 1792–1793
- Monarch: George III
- Prime Minister: William Pitt the Younger
- Preceded by: Wilson Gale-Braddyll
- Succeeded by: William Fullarton

Personal details
- Born: c.1737
- Died: 7 September 1793 (aged 55–56)
- Spouse: Colin Campbell

James Baillie (1737 – 7 September 1793) was a British merchant, planter and politician who represented Horsham in the House of Commons of Great Britain from 1792 to 1793.

== Life ==
Baillie was the second son of Hugh Baillie, of Dochfour, south of Inverness, by his wife Emilia, daughter of Alexander Fraser, 11th of Relig, Reelig or Rulick, Kirkhill, Inverness.

James Baillie's younger brother was Evan Baillie, of Dochfour, of Parliament, the West Indies and Bristol.

Baillie arrived in St. Christopher's (Saint Kitts) in 1755, and soon bought the Hermitage plantation in Grenada, undertook around 20 years of work, and in 1775 (?) returned to Great Britain and London. In 1772 James Baillie wrote: "[through] 1755–71 I was employed in the line of planting and commerce in the islands of St Christopher and Grenada [and Demerary]... and [in 1772] our house sold Negroes here to the amount of £120,000 sterling..." At the time of the 1833 compensation claims Baillie's heirs were awarded c. £73,700 compensation for their c. 1,821 slaves in Grenada, Guyana and St. Lucia.

He was M.P. for Horsham, in Sussex, from 1792 for only 18 months. There he had seemed to have been beaten at the poll, and so before a petition gave him the seat, he had been appointed British agent to Grenada. It is unclear whether he took up that post or where he died.

But as Member for Horsham Baillie it is known that he spoke well in favour of the planters (plantation owners) in the slavery debate of 2 April 1792, against Wilberforce's "wild, impracticable, and visionary scheme" of abolition, adding that there was "more wretchedness and poverty in the parish of St. Giles' than in the whole of the British colonies". He had his speech published.

Baillie's Estate Act 1805
- Act of Parliament
- Parliament of the United Kingdom
- Long title: An Act for vesting the Mansion House and Land, called Ealing Grove, in the County of Middlesex, (Part of the Estates devised by the Will of James Baillie Esquire,) in Trustees upon Trust, to sell the same under the Directions of the Court of Chancery, and to apply the Money arising from the Sale thereof in the Purchase of other Hereditaments, to be settled to the Uses of the Will of the said James Baillie.
- Citation: 45 Geo. 3. c. xc

Dates
- Royal assent: 27 June 1805

Text of statute as originally enacted

In London Baillie lived in Bedford Square and Ealing Grove, the nine bays and three-storeyed pedimented central projection Palladian palace set in 64 acres, re-modeled for Joseph Gulston, the younger, the collector and MP. Ealing Grove had then been owned by 4th Duke of Marlborough (1775) and 5th Duke of Argyll before Baillie bought it in 1791. The 5th Earl of Oxford was the tenant between 1799 and 1802, and Baillie's heirs sold Ealing Grove in 1811, having had a local act of Parliament, Baillie's Estate Act 1805 (45 Geo. 3. c. xc), passed. By 1800 James Baillie's widow, Mrs. Baillie (Colina), was living at 12 Harley Street, Cavendish Square.

== Monumental portrait ==
The world of Baillie was captured by Thomas Gainsborough in a large (100 x 90 inches) portrait that had been intended for the RA show of 1784. It was bequeathed to the National Gallery by his son, a school-friend of Lord Byron, "Long Baillie", Alexander Baillie (1777–1855) in 1855, with provision for it to first be lent to his nephew Matthew James Higgins (1810–1868), aka Jacob Omnium; thus it passed to the national collection (now Tate Britain) in 1868.

Alexander Baillie, drawn by Ingres in 1816, was a close friend of Jørgen von Cappelen Knudtzon (1784–1854), the Norwegian. Bust portraits of both von Cappelen and Baillie were carved by Bertel Thorvaldsen. Alexander Baillie was buried in the Protestant cemetery in Naples in the same grave as writer and kinswoman Harriet Charlotte Beaujolais Campbell (died Naples 2.1848, aged 46), aka Viscountess Tullamore and Countess of Charleville, who had married (Florence, 1821) Charles Bury, 2nd Earl of Charleville, and Francois "Dominique" Joseph Loridan, Valet de Chambre to M. Alexander Baillie of Naples, Tuscany (23 April 1780 – 16 April 1853).

In November 2008 Highland News (13 November 2008) reported that local MSP David Stewart had raised the issue of Inverness Museum and Art Gallery's loan request of the Baillie family by Gainsborough at the Scottish Parliament's Question Time. He was supported by the then tourism minister Jim Mather, as well as Highland Council convener Sandy Park, Inverness Provost Jimmy Gray and Highland councillor and historian David Alston. Stewart said: "The painting is controversial because the Baillie family were involved in the slave trade. Following the emancipation of slaves in 1834 they received the equivalent of 5.5 million, which they reinvested in their estates in the Highlands and Islands... and was used to develop the Highlands through establishments like Inverness Royal Academy and the Royal Northern Infirmary. This was the only Highlander that to my knowledge was painted by Gainsborough. However, history should be seen warts and all, it's important that people know what it is. The Baillies played a big part in the development of the Highlands. It's a bit like the Highland Clearances, they are an appalling part of Highland history but people should know about it. Schools could make the painting a research project. If we got the painting on loan this would provide a huge boost to tourism in the Highlands and Islands and attract inward investment. It would be like when Caley Thistle signed Marius Niculae."

A version of this portrait which just shows Colina and Colin-Campbell by Gainsborough Dupont, it measures 36.5 x 28 inches, and has been in the Collections of Donaldson (Sir George Hunter Donaldson, Kt. (1845–1925)), Durand-Ruel and Gustavia A. Tapscott, of Richmond, Virginia, a Pomeranian breeder, who had become in 1880, Mrs Charles H. Senff. As a widow she lived at East 79th Street and Knollwood, Long Island, and died 18 November 1927. Charles H. Senff (died 1911, aged 74), of Madison Avenue and 41st street, New York, The Beeches, Whitestone, Long Island, and Curles Neck Farm (5500 acres, with 3000 acres under plantation, and 100 permanent workers. In addition there they were champion breeders of Red Polled Cattle in the USA), was a director of the American Sugar Refining Company, and associate and cousin of Henry Osborne Havemeyer. Charles Henry Senff was the son of Dr. Henry Senff by Susannah Havemeyer, daughter of Frederick C. Havemeyer of the sugar refinery company Havemeyers & Elder, which controlled most of the international sugar market, and evolved into the American Sugar Refining Company. Mr. Senff had a renowned and valuable collection of paintings, which included a Frans Hals portrait and some Corot bathing nymphs. In 1912 the collection was valued at $822,300.

== Personal life ==
He married, on 26 April 1772, Colina or Colin Campbell (1753-) one of the two surviving daughters (and co-heiresses) of Colin Roy Campbell, of Glenure (c1708-1752). They had at least one son, and at least two daughters, who married and had issue.

=== Present day ===
Michael Baillie, 3rd Baron Burton was the representative of the family of Baillie of Dochfour until his death in 2013.

== See also ==
- George Baillie
