= Daniel Whittle Harvey =

English politician (1786–1863)

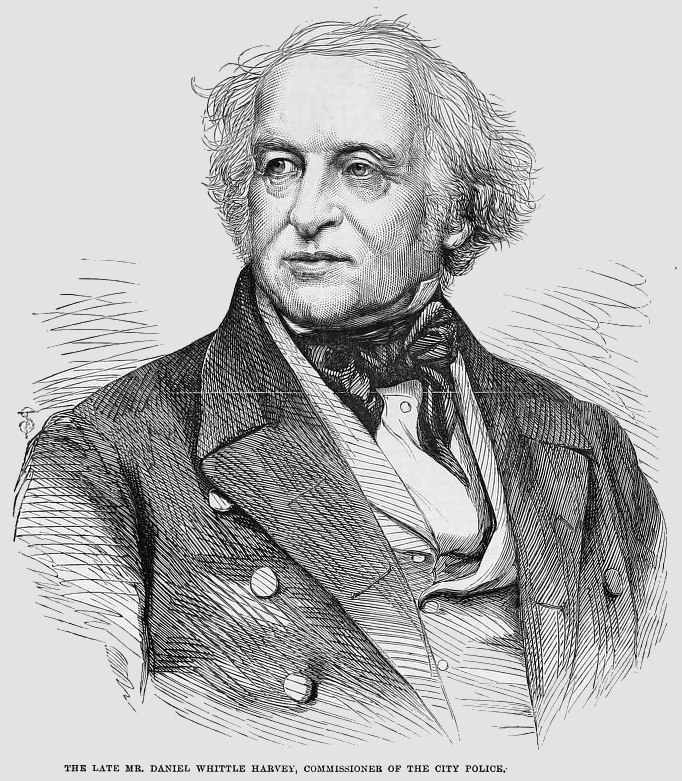

Daniel Whittle Harvey (10 January 1786 – 24 February 1863) was a Radical English politician who founded The Sunday Times newspaper and was the first Commissioner of the City of London Police.

== Biography ==
Harvey trained as a lawyer, and became a Fellow of the Inner Temple in 1818, but was twice refused admission to the bar. He first stood for Parliament in 1812 as Radical candidate for Colchester, and was defeated, but secured election for the same borough in 1818. At the 1820 election he was deprived of victory when his qualification proved defective, but he was re-elected in 1826 and for several elections thereafter; he subsequently also represented Southwark. He was a gifted orator and consistently took a moderate radical line, advocating limited reform both of Parliament and of the Church, and was at times bitterly at odds with the Whig government. In 1839 he was one of the MPs who took part in the conference with William Lovett's London Working Men's Association from which the Chartists emerged.

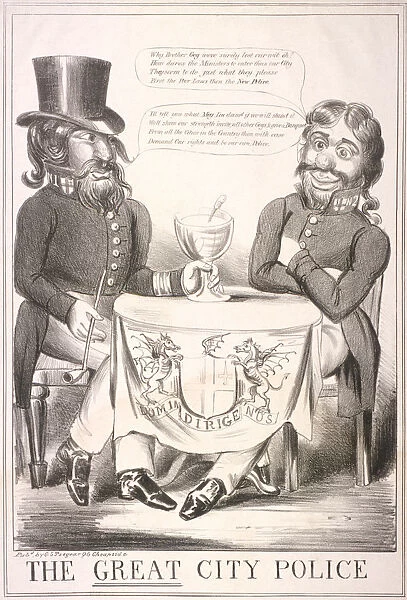
Caricatures of City of London constables, 1840

In 1821, Harvey founded a Sunday newspaper, The New Observer, which the following year adopted its present title, The Sunday Times. On one occasion he was imprisoned when the paper libelled the King, George IV.

In 1839, he was appointed Registrar of the Metropolitan Public Carriages, becoming the chief regulator of the taxi trade in London. Later the same year, the City of London Police was re-organised, and Harvey relinquished his seat in Parliament to become its first Commissioner; he retained the post until 1863.

Parliament of the United Kingdom
Preceded by James Beckford Wildman; Sir William Burroughs	Member of Parliament for Colchester; 1818–1820; With: James Beckford Wildman	Succeeded by James Beckford Wildman; Henry Baring
Preceded by James Beckford Wildman; Henry Baring	Member of Parliament for Colchester; 1826–1835; With: Sir George Henry Smyth 1826–1830; Andrew Spottiswoode 1830–1831; William Mayhew 1831–1832; Richard Sanderson1832–1835	Succeeded by Sir George Henry Smyth; Richard Sanderson
Preceded by John Humphery; William Brougham	Member of Parliament for Southwark; 1835–1840; With: John Humphery	Succeeded by John Humphery; Benjamin Wood
Police appointments
New institution	Commissioner of the City of London Police; 1839–1863	Succeeded by James Fraser
