= Hugh Spottiswoode =

English cricketer, printer, and businessman

Personal information
- Full name: William Hugh Spottiswoode
- Born: 12 July 1864; Belgravia, London
- Died: 20 August 1915 (aged 51); Llandrindod Wells, Radnorshire, Wales
- Batting: Right-handed
- Bowling: Slow
- Relatives: William Spottiswoode (father); Andrew Spottiswoode (grandfather); Reginald Arbuthnot (uncle); Gerry Crutchley (son-in-law)

Domestic team information
- Years: Team
- 1890: Kent

Career statistics
| Competition | First-class |
|---|---|
| Matches | 2 |
| Runs scored | 51 |
| Batting average | 17.00 |
| 100s/50s | 0/0 |
| Top score | 37 |
| Catches/stumpings | 1/– |
- Source: Cricinfo, 15 May 2010

William Hugh Spottiswoode (12 July 1864 – 20 August 1915) was an English printer, businessman and amateur cricketer.

== Early life ==
Spottiswoode was born at Belgravia in London, the eldest son of William Spottiswoode and his wife Eliza in 1864. His father was a Fellow of the Royal Society, a mathematician and a physicist and was on the board of printers Eyre & Spottiswoode, the Queen's Printer. His grandfather, Andrew Spottiswoode, had been MP for Saltash and, briefly, Colchester and had taken over the printing business from his uncle Andrew Strahan in 1819.

The family lived in Bexley in Kent and Spottiswoode grew up there before being educated at Eton College and Balliol College, Oxford, where he captained his college cricket team. He did not play for either Eton or Oxford University. In 1886 he was elected a member of the Royal Institution.

== Business career ==
Spottiswoode became a partner in Eyre & Spottiswoode in 1885, soon after the death of his father in 1883. The firm continued as Kings' Printer following the death of Queen Victoria and accession of King Edward VII. He went on to manage the company as well as being chairman of The Sphere and Tatler and a director of piano manufacturer John Broadwood & Sons.

Whilst chairman of the Printers' Pension Corporation in 1903 he established Printer's Pie, the profits of which went to the corporation and other charitable causes. He was a director of the Royal Academy of Music, a committee member of the Royal Literary Fund and managed the Royal Institution for a period. In 1912 he worked with Francis McClean to pioneer the use of aerial photography of underwater objects, taking images of the wreck of SS Oceana at Eastbourne and was elected to the Royal Aero Club the same year.

== Cricket ==
Spottiswoode was an enthusiastic cricketer. In club cricket, he played successfully for Bexley Wanderers, West Kent, Eton Ramblers, and Band of Brothers, which was closely linked to Kent County Cricket Club. He played three times for the County Club in 1890, including twice in first-class matches against Yorkshire and Gloucestershire. In his three first-class innings he scored 51 runs with a highest score of 37 and Wisden described his lob bowling as sometimes "very successful".

Spottiswoode's son-in-law Gerry Crutchley and uncle Reginald Arbuthnot both played first-class cricket, Arbuthnot for Kent. His young brother, Cyril, was a member of the Old Stagers theatre group and described in his Wisden obituary as "a familiar figure at the Canterbury Week". He died in the same year as Hugh.

== Family and later life ==
Spottiswoode married Sylvia Tomlin at Westminster Abbey in 1893. The couple had two children.

He died of heart failure at Llandrindod Wells, Radnorshire in August 1915 aged 51.

== Bibliography ==
- Carlaw, Derek (2020). Kent County Cricketers, A to Z: Part One (1806–1914) (PDF). Cardiff: ACS.
