= Sir George Smyth, 6th Baronet =

British Conservative and Tory politician

Sir George Smyth Bt

Member of Parliament for Colchester
- In office 17 January 1835 – 6 February 1850 Serving with Joseph Hardcastle (1847–1850); Richard Sanderson (1835–1847)
- Preceded by: Daniel Whittle Harvey; Richard Sanderson
- Succeeded by: John Manners; Joseph Hardcastle
- In office 9 June 1826 – 20 April 1829 Serving with Daniel Whittle Harvey
- Preceded by: Henry Baring; James Beckford Wildman
- Succeeded by: Daniel Whittle Harvey; Richard Sanderson

Personal details
- Born: 4 January 1784
- Died: 11 July 1852 (aged 68)
- Party: Conservative/Tory

Sir George Henry Smyth, 6th Baronet of Upton (30 January 1784 – 11 July 1852) was a British Conservative and Tory politician.

== Early life and family ==
Smyth was the son of Sir Robert Smyth, 5th Baronet of Berechurch and spinster Charlotte Sophia Delaval Blake. Educated first in Paris, he was admitted to Trinity Hall, Cambridge in 1802, and inherited his father's Berechurch estate in 1805—which he extended and rebuilt, making him popular and respected in the local Colchester area—and the Baronetcy of Upton. In 1815, he married Eva Elmore, daughter of George Elmore of Penton, near Andover in Hampshire, and they had at least one child, Charlotte (1813–1845), who was illegitimate.

== Political career ==
While refurbishing his estate, Smyth became popular and a leading figure in the local anti-Catholic Tory Blue party, which dominated local politics. In 1821, he chaired the meeting which saw the creation of the Loyal Colchester Association, which aimed to "counteract the diffusion of loyal and seditious principles" and, in the same year, at an anniversary dinner for the Colchester True Blue or Pitt Club, which he was active in, he congratulated members for "the increased ascendancy which True Blue principles were gaining every day".

This helped Smyth towards his first successful bid for parliament, culminating in his successful election as Member of Parliament (MP) for Colchester at the 1826 general election, when he stood to replace the retiring ministerialists, James Beckford Wildman and Henry Baring. At the hustings for the election, he declared himself "an admirer of the king [George IV]; a firm supporter of the church and state; and that to the utmost of his ability, he would walk in the footsteps of the immortal Mr. Pitt [William Pitt the Younger]". In consequence of a pact with the Radical, Daniel Whittle Harvey, the pair were returned unopposed. Smyth's father had also been an MP for the constituency between 1780 and April 1784, and July 1784 and 1788, as well as for Cardigan between 1774 and 1775.

In parliament, Smyth presented two petitions against Catholic relief; the first from Colchester archdeaconry and residents, and the second from the corporation, both in March 1827. He then voted accordingly on a bill in the same month. Other votes included voting in favour of the duke of Clarence's annuity bill and against the corn bill, both in 1827.

However, he gradually grew apart from the government's views, telling a dinner of the True Blue Club in November 1827 "there might be some difficulty as to the course which he should pursue, but... he would not take a seat with the Whigs, nor with those who had come round to the True Blues for the sake of place". In particular, he was a "diehard opponent" Catholic emancipation, "dividing doggedly against it" and presenting a petition to the House of Commons to "guard the country from the danger to which it was exposed from the machinations of men who were avowedly hostile to the church establishment" if the Test Acts were repealed. He presented further anti-Catholic petitions and, in November 1828, urged the formation of a local Brunswick Club, of which he became its first president. At the local mayoral election in the same month, he "avowed himself a staunch supporter of the Protestant cause" and suggested that ministers looked "favourably" on the club and its supporters. Ultimately, however, he resigned his parliamentary seat in 1829 "in disgust" at the Wellington–Peel ministry's concession of Catholic emancipation, by accepting the office of Steward of the Chiltern Hundreds. At a dinner celebrating the return of his replacement, Richard Sanderson, another True Blue, he said he was "disgusted with the House of Commons", saying emancipation would be "the ruin of Old England".

Nevertheless, he remained prominent in Colchester politics, although he admitted he was "wholly ignorant" of the currency question relating to beer and malt taxes, but hoped the ministry would alleviate the tax burden and "discount the radical nostrum of a property tax". He made similar points when standing for election at Essex at a by-election in 1830, where he professed himself a "Tory of the old school". At that year's general election, he stood again for Colchester but withdrew from the race, which had six candidates, before the poll. At a by-election in 1831 he supported Sir William Curtis, 2nd Baronet, a Tory, in his unsuccessful bid for the seat, and at the general election of the same month, he was a prominent supporter of Richard Sanderson, who was again seeking election.

Smyth returned to the seat at the 1835 general election, then holding it until 1850 when he again resigned, due to "age and infirmities", accepting the office of Steward of the Chiltern Hundreds. During this period, he was an opponent of the Maynooth Grant and repeal of the corn laws.

== Death ==
Smyth died at his home in Berechurch in 1852, leaving no legitimate issue, with his estate being passed to the children of his illegitimate daughter, Charlotte, who had married Thomas White of Wetherfield, Essex. He was remembered as a "fine specimen of the old English gentleman", while the baronetcy became extinct.

Parliament of the United Kingdom
Preceded by Henry Baring; James Beckford Wildman	Member of Parliament for Colchester; 1826–1829; With: Daniel Whittle Harvey	Succeeded by Daniel Whittle Harvey; Richard Sanderson
Preceded by Daniel Whittle Harvey; Richard Sanderson	Member of Parliament for Colchester; 1835–1850; With: Joseph Hardcastle (1847–1850); Richard Sanderson (1835–1847)	Succeeded by John Manners; Joseph Hardcastle
Baronetage of England
Preceded by Robert Smyth	Baronet (of Upton); 1802 – 1852	Extinct
