= Richard Hart Davis =

British merchant and Tory politician

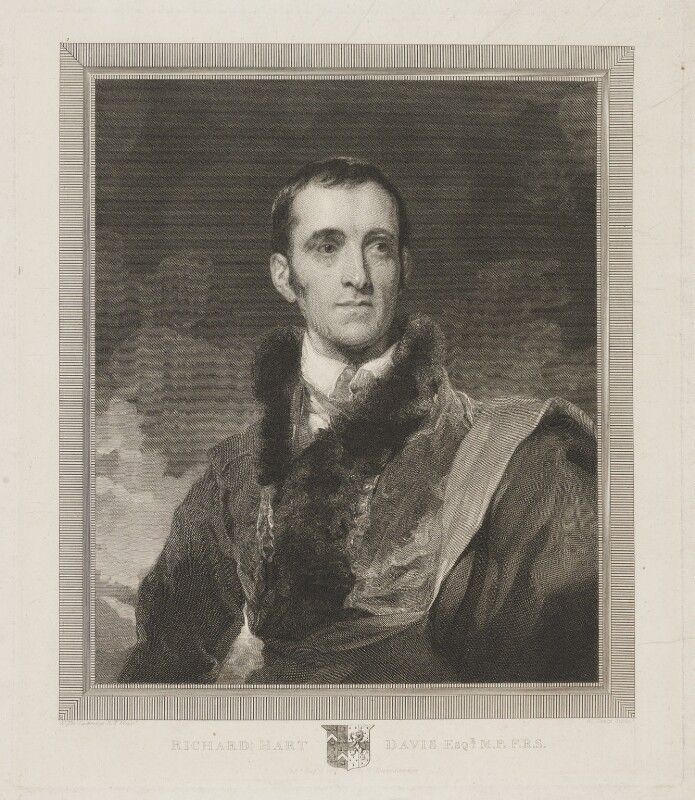
- Portrait published 12 August 1814

Member of Parliament for Bristol
- In office 15 July 1812 – 23 April 1831
- Preceded by: Charles Bathurst
- Succeeded by: Edward Davis Protheroe

Member of Parliament for Colchester
- In office 4 May 1807 – 23 June 1812 Serving with Robert Thornton
- Preceded by: William Tufnell
- Succeeded by: Hart Davis

Personal details
- Born: 8 June 1766
- Died: 21 February 1842 (aged 75)
- Party: Tory
- Children: 1 son (Hart Davis) and 1 daughter (Louisa Davis)
- Occupation: Merchant and politician

Richard Hart Davis (8 June 1766 - 21 February 1842) was a British merchant and Tory politician who served as Member of Parliament for both Colchester and Bristol.

== Merchant career ==
Davis was a successful merchant in Bristol trading with the West Indies. In 1810, he was said to have made £200,000 by "getting possession of all the Spanish wool in the kingdom". In 1803, he joined the Society of Merchant Venturers in Bristol.

== Parliamentary career ==
Davis was elected to Parliament in the 1807 general election as the MP for Colchester taking the seat from Whig MP William Tufnell. He didn't speak during this period until he stepped down from his seat allowing his son, Hart Davis, to take the seat. He was elected as MP for Bristol for 15 days before Parliament was dissolved for the 1812 general election where he received a personal letter from then Prime Minister Lord Liverpool who wished him luck in his election against the Radicals.

=== Political positions ===
Davis opposed Catholic relief.

== Personal life ==
Davis' son, Hart Davis, was also a Tory MP.

Parliament of the United Kingdom
Preceded by William Tufnell; Robert Thornton	Member of Parliament for Colchester; 1807 – 1812; With: Robert Thornton	Succeeded by Robert Thornton; Hart Davis
Preceded by Evan Baillie; Charles Bathurst	Member of Parliament for Bristol; 1812 – 1831; With: Evan Baillie to 1812; Edward Protheroe 1812-1820; Henry Bright 1820-1830; James Evan Baillie from 1830	Succeeded by James Evan Baillie; Edward Davis Protheroe
