= John Denison (MP) =

British politician

- Born: John Wilkinson; 1758?
- Died: 6 May 1820, aged 62; Ossington
- Occupation: Politician
- Years active: 1796-1812

John Denison (born John Wilkinson; 1758? – 6 May 1820) was Member of Parliament for the English constituencies of Wootton Bassett (1796–1802), Colchester (1802–1806), and Minehead (1807–1812).

He was the second son of John Wilkinson, factor at Blackwell Hall in London for Potterton, West Riding of Yorkshire, and his wife Anne née Denison. His mother's brother, Robert Denison (died 1782) of Ossington, Nottinghamshire, a woollen merchant in Leeds, bequeathed to him his business interests and his estates in County Durham, Lincolnshire, Nottinghamshire and Yorkshire on condition that he adopted the surname Denison; which he did on 16 April 1785. Robert's fortune was said to have amounted to £700,000; of the order of £84 million in 2020 money. This new wealth made John a figure of considerable influence in Yorkshire and Nottinghamshire.

In 1788, he was reported as having little interest in politics. In 1791, he got round a clause in his uncle's will, gave up business, and settled at Ossington as a country gentleman. In 1796, he entered Parliament as MP for Wootton Bassett, Wiltshire under the patronage of Viscount Bolingbroke. He almost always voted with the government. In 1802, he was elected MP for Colchester, Essex; a seat where "a long purse" was needed to win the support of the voters. He stood down at the 1806 election, because he had opposed the government on one issue and had lost its support. He asserted that he could have retained his seat, but that "it is rather too much to expect one to sacrifice thousands for the honour of a seat on the green benches [in the House of Commons]". In the 1807 election, he was elected MP for Minehead, Somerset, under the patronage of the Luttrell family. He was inconspicuous in that Parliament. He retired from politics in 1812, and died in 1820.

He married twice. First on 5 March 1787, to Maria Charlotte (died 1794), daughter of Isaac Webb Horlock of Ashwick, Somerset; with whom he had two sons and one daughter. The second marriage was in December 1796, to Charlotte, daughter of Samuel Estwick the elder; with whom he had nine sons and three daughters. His third son with Charlotte was William Denison (1804–1871), colonial administrator. He was the father-in-law of Charles Manners-Sutton and the father of Viscount Ossington, who both became Speaker of the House of Commons.

Parliament of Great Britain
| Preceded by John Stanley; The Viscount Downe | Member of Parliament for Wootton Bassett; 1796-1800; With: Edward Clarke | Succeeded by Parliament of the United Kingdom |
Parliament of the United Kingdom
| Preceded by Parliament of Great Britain | Member of Parliament for Wootton Bassett; 1801-1802; With: Edward Clarke | Succeeded by General the Hon. Henry St John; Robert Williams |
| Preceded by Robert Thornton; The Lord Muncaster | Member of Parliament for Colchester; 1802-1806; With: Robert Thornton | Succeeded by Robert Thornton; William Tufnell |
| Preceded by The Lord Rancliffe; John Fownes Luttrell | Member of Parliament for Minehead; May 1807-1812; With: John Fownes Luttrell | Succeeded by John Fownes Luttrell, junior John Fownes Luttrell |
