= Reginald Arbuthnot =

English businessman and amateur cricketer

Personal information
- Full name: Reginald James Hugh Arbuthnot
- Born: 2 June 1853; Brighton, Sussex
- Died: 19 September 1917 (aged 64); Brighton, Sussex
- Batting: Right-handed

Domestic team information
- Years: Team
- 1881–1890: Kent
- FC debut: 25 August 1881 Kent v Lancashire
- Last FC: 8 May 1890 Kent v Marylebone Cricket Club (MCC)

Career statistics
Competition	First-class
Matches	2
Runs scored	8
Batting average	2.00
100s/50s	0/0
Top score	5
Catches/stumpings	0/–
- Source: CricInfo, 18 October 2008

Reginald James Hugh Arbuthnot (2 June 1853 – 19 September 1917) was an English businessman and amateur cricketer who played two first-class cricket matches for Kent County Cricket Club.

== Early life ==
Arbuthnot was born at Brighton in Sussex, the son of William Urquhart Arbuthnot and Elizabeth Arbuthnot. His father was a partner in the Indian banking firm Arbuthnot & Co based in Madras and was a member of the Indian Council. He was the grandson of Sir William Arbuthnot, 1st Baronet.

The family lived at Brigden Place in Bexley in Kent and Arbuthnot was educated at Rugby School. Whilst at Rugby he played cricket in the school XI.

== Business career ==
After leaving school Arbuthnot spent an extended time in India on business working for the family firm as well as working in England as a coffee broker. He was a member of the Madras Legislative Council in 1891–1892. The firm failed "spectacularly" in 1906, although Arbuthnot was wealthy enough to continue to live in London without needing to work.

== Cricket ==
Arbuthnot played cricket twice for Kent. His first-class debut came in 1881 and, after time in India, his second appearance was in 1890. He played non first-class cricket for a range of teams, including Marylebone Cricket Club (MCC), Blackheath Cricket Club and Madras Cricket Club.

== Later life and family ==
Arbuthnot died suddenly of heart failure in 1917 aged 64 leaving an estate worth over £14,000. His nephew, Hugh Spottiswoode, also played two first-class matches for Kent.

== Bibliography ==
- Carlaw, Derek (2020). Kent County Cricketers, A to Z: Part One (1806–1914) (PDF). Cardiff: ACS.
