= Sir William Burroughs, 1st Baronet =

British politician; (1753–1829)

Sir William Burroughs, 1st Baronet (c. 1753 – 1 June 1829) was an Anglo-Irish judge and politician.

== Background and education ==
Burroughs was the son of the Venerable Lewis Burroughs, Archdeacon of Derry, by Mary Cane, daughter of Richard Cane, of Larabrian, County Kildare. He was educated at Trinity College, Dublin, and was called to the Irish Bar in 1778 and to the English Bar in 1803.

== Legal and political career ==
Burroughs practised at the Irish Bar for ten years. After coming into financial difficulties he tried his fortune in British India in 1789. In 1792, he was appointed Advocate-General of Bengal. After making a comfortable fortune he resigned his post and returned to Britain in 1801.

The following year he was returned to parliament for Enniskillen. In 1804 he was created a baronet, of Castle Bagshaw in the County of Wicklow.

In 1806, he was made a judge of the Supreme Court of Judicature in Calcutta and resigned his seat in parliament the same year. He returned to Britain in 1817 and was elected to the House of Commons as one of two representatives for Colchester. He continued to represent this constituency until 1818 and then sat for Taunton until 1819.

== Family ==
Burroughs married Letitia Newburgh had one son and three daughters.

- William (15 September 1784 – 11 May 1814), died of wounds received before the Battle of Bayonne
- Letitia, married Admiral Sir Charles Ogle, 2nd Baronet
- Maria Isabelle (died 1798), died unmarried
- Louisa, married Sir Thomas Andrew Lumisden Strange

Several reputable sources, including the Dictionary of National Biography, describe him as the grandfather of General Sir Frederick Traill-Burroughs (born Burroughs). However, Traill-Burroughs was born 15 years after the death of Sir William's only son.

He died in Bath in 1829, at which point the baronetcy became extinct.

Parliament of the United Kingdom
Preceded by John Beresford	Member of Parliament for Enniskillen; 1802–1806	Succeeded by John King
Preceded by Robert Thornton; Hart Davis	Member of Parliament for Colchester; 1817–1818; With: Hart Davis 1817–1818; James Beckford Wildman 1818	Succeeded by James Beckford Wildman; Daniel Whittle Harvey
Preceded by Alexander Baring; Henry Powell Collins	Member of Parliament for Taunton; 1818–1819; With: Alexander Baring	Succeeded by Alexander Baring; Henry Powell Collins
Baronetage of the United Kingdom
New creation	Baronet (of Castle Bagshaw); 1804–1829	Extinct
Preceded by Ainslie baronets	Burroughs baronets of Castle Bagshaw; 19 November 1804	Succeeded by Hartwell baronets
