= Percy Crutchley =

English cricketer

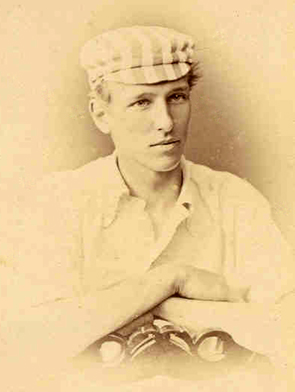
- Crutchley in the 1870s

Personal information
- Full name: Percy Edward Crutchley
- Born: 24 July 1855; Parsonstown, King's County, Ireland
- Died: 16 October 1940 (aged 85); Sunninghill, Berkshire, England
- Batting: Right-handed
- Bowling: Right-arm slow round-arm
- Relatives: Victor Crutchley (son); Gerry Crutchley (nephew)

Career statistics
Competition	First-class
Matches	3
Runs scored	128
Batting average	32.00
100s/50s	0/1
Top score	84
Balls bowled	96
Wickets	2
Bowling average	34.00
5 wickets in innings	0
10 wickets in match	0
Best bowling	2/68
Catches/stumpings	0/–
- Source: Cricinfo, 8 May 2018

Percy Edward Crutchley (24 July 1855 – 16 October 1940) was an English amateur cricketer.

Crutchley was the son of General Charles Crutchley. He was educated at Harrow School, where he played cricket in the First XI in 1873 and 1874. He went up to Trinity College, Cambridge, in 1874, but did not play cricket for the university; he did, however, win a blue at real tennis. He played regular club cricket for I Zingari from 1874 to 1883.

He played in three first-class cricket matches, one in each of 1876, 1877 and 1878. The first was for Gentlemen of Marylebone Cricket Club against Kent at the St Lawrence Ground in Canterbury in August 1876. Gentlemen of Marylebone Cricket Club followed on 329 runs behind, but in the second innings Crutchley made 84 and put on 227 for the fifth wicket with W. G. Grace, who made a world record individual score of 344 in 380 minutes.

Crutchley married the Hon. Frederica Louise Fitzroy, daughter of the 3rd Baron Southampton and Maid of Honour to Queen Victoria, on 12 February 1890. Queen Victoria was the godmother of their only child, Victor, born in 1893, who became an admiral in the Royal Navy and was awarded the Victoria Cross.

Crutchley inherited Sunninghill Park, Berkshire, which he owned until he sold it in 1936, after his wife's death in 1932. He was a member of Royal Ascot Cricket Club in Berkshire for 57 years, and served as its president from 1915 to 1924.
