= Edward Crutchley =

English cricketer

Personal information
- Full name: Edward Crutchley
- Born: 2 April 1922; Paddington, London, England
- Died: 18 October 1982 (aged 60); Guildford, Surrey, England
- Role: Batsman
- Relatives: Gerry Crutchley (father)

Domestic team information
- Years: Team
- 1947: Middlesex

Career statistics
Competition	First-class
Matches	2
Runs scored	17
Batting average
100s/50s
Top score
Balls bowled
Wickets
Bowling average
5 wickets in innings
10 wickets in match
Best bowling
Catches/stumpings
- Source: Edward Crutchley at Cricinfo, 19 November 2024

Edward Crutchley (2 April 1922 – 18 October 1982) was an English cricketer who played two first-class matches for Middlesex County Cricket Club in 1947.

Crutchley was born at Paddington in London, the son of Gerry Crutchley who had played for Middlesex between 1910 and 1930. He was educated at Harrow School where he was in the cricket XI, scoring a century against Eton College at Lord's in 1939.

He studied at Christ Church, Oxford before serving in the British Army Scot's Guards during World War II; wounded in Italy. After the War he was a partner in the Stockbroking firm Read, Hurst-Brown, in the City of London. Crutchley died at Mount Alvernia nursing home at Guildford in 1982 aged 60.
