= Gerry Crutchley =

English cricketer

Personal information
- Full name: Gerald Edward Victor Crutchley
- Born: 19 November 1890; Chelsea, London
- Died: 17 August 1969 (aged 78); St John's Wood, London
- Batting: Right-handed
- Bowling: Right-arm medium Right-arm legbreak
- Relatives: Edward Crutchley (son); Percy Crutchley (uncle); Hugh Spottiswoode (father-in-law)

Domestic team information
- Years: Team
- 1910–1912: Oxford University
- 1910–1930: Middlesex
- FC debut: 30 May 1910 Oxford University v Worcestershire
- Last FC: 25 June 1932 HDG Leveson-Gower's XI v Cambridge University

Career statistics
Competition	First-class
Matches	123
Runs scored	4,112
Batting average	22.46
100s/50s	5/14
Top score	181
Balls bowled	3,845
Wickets	67
Bowling average	32.70
5 wickets in innings	0
10 wickets in match	0
Best bowling	4/52
Catches/stumpings	54/–
- Source: CricInfo, 22 December 2019

Gerald Edward Victor Crutchley (19 November 1890 – 17 August 1969) was an English first-class cricketer who played for Middlesex County Cricket Club and Oxford University between 1910 and 1930.

Crutchley was born at Chelsea, the son of Major-General Sir Charles Crutchley. He was educated at Harrow School and New College, Oxford before working as a stockbroker in the City of London. As a cricketer he was a right-handed batsman who bowled leg-breaks and medium pace and who played more than 120 first-class cricket matches. He had played for his school XI and won a cricket Blue at Oxford, playing for the University between 1910 and 1912. He made 99 runs not out against Cambridge in 1912; overnight he was taken ill with measles and had to sit out the rest of the match.

He made his Middlesex debut in 1910 but played only a handful of matches for the county side before World War I. After the war he played more regularly, both for Middlesex and for a variety of amateur sides, including for the Gentlemen against the Players four times. He was a member of the Committee at Middlesex and President from 1958 to 1962.

Crutchley was commissioned in the Scots Guards during World War I and was a Prisoner of War from January 1915 until he returned to England in November 1918.

He died of heart failure at St John's Wood in 1969 aged 78. He was the father of the actress Rosalie Crutchley.
