= Ron Crutchley =

English footballer

Personal information
- Full name: Ronald Crutchley
- Date of birth: 20 June 1922
- Place of birth: Walsall, England
- Date of death: August 1987 (aged 65)
- Position: Wing half

Senior career*
| Years | Team | Apps | (Gls) |
| 1945–50 | Walsall | 62 | (4) |
| 1950–54 | Shrewsbury Town | 146 | (1) |
| 1954– | Wellington Town | | |
- * Club domestic league appearances and goals

Ronald Crutchley (20 June 1922 – August 1987) was an English professional footballer.

Born in Walsall, Crutchley joined Walsall in 1945, where he gained a reputation as a "hard-working defensive wing-half". After 62 appearances in four seasons, he joined Shrewsbury Town in 1950. In 1954 he left Shrewsbury and signed for Wellington Town.
