= Lewis Burroughs =

Irish Anglican priest (1714–1786)

Lewis Burroughs (1714 - 1786) was an eighteenth century Irish Anglican priest.

Burroughs was born in County Londonderry and educated at Trinity College, Dublin. He was the Archdeacon of Derry from 1785 until his death.

His son was the judge and politician Sir William Burroughs, 1st Baronet
