= William Mayhew (politician) =

British politician

William Mayhew (2 March 1787 – 26 April 1855) was a British politician.

The eldest child of three sons and a daughter born to William and Hannah Mayhew, of Coggeshall, Mayhew's father was a victualler and innkeeper who had formerly earned his living as a woolcomber. The Mayhew family were of some distinction, being descendants of Augustine Mayhew (1622-1693), an attorney and lord of the manors of Great and Little Coggeshall, and William Mayhew (c. 1736–1787), a barrister, bencher of Gray's Inn, high steward and recorder of Colchester, and recorder of Ipswich and Aldeburgh.

Second son Thomas became a cabinet maker at Coggeshall; the third brother, James, later a brandy merchant, was a partner in William's business as a wine, beer and spirit merchant in London. William was declared bankrupt in 1843. Mayhew was the Whig Member of Parliament (MP) for Colchester, Essex from 9 April 1831 to 1832.

Mayhew lived at Camberwell, Surrey. He was survived by his widow and children, including son William, who administered his father's estate.
