= 1971 in art =

Events from the year 1971 in art.

== Events ==
- July 22 – The Lady of Baza Iberian sculpture (4th century BCE) is discovered.
- October 24 – English painter Francis Bacon's lover, George Dyer, commits suicide two days before the opening of the artist's retrospective at Paris's Grand Palais; Bacon will paint The Black Triptychs in his memory.
- Construction of the Centre Georges Pompidou in Paris begins.
- New Walker Art Center in Minneapolis, designed by Edward Larrabee Barnes, opens.

== Awards ==
- Archibald Prize: Clifton Pugh – Sir John McEwen

== Works ==
- Chris Burden - Shoot
- Abram Games – Stockwell tile motif on London Underground's Victoria line
- Hans Haacke – Real Time Social System
- David Hockney
  - Mr and Mrs Clark and Percy
  - Portrait of Sir David Webster
- Helen Journeay – Dawn (sculpture, Houston, Texas)
- Nabil Kanso – Place des Martyres (paintings) (1971 through 1974)
- Fritz Koenig – Great Spherical Caryatid ("The Sphere", for World Trade Center, New York City)
- Hans Melis – Statue of John Cabot (Confederation Building, St. John's, Newfoundland and Labrador)
- John Raimondi – Cage
- Lucas Samaras - Stiff Box 12
- Peter Sedgely – Pimlico tile motif on London Underground's Victoria line
- George Smith – Vauxhall tile motif on London Underground's Victoria line
- Kaapa Tjampitjinpa – Gulgardi
- Hans Unger – Brixton tile motif on London Underground's Victoria line
- Francisco Zúñiga – Mother and Daughter Seated (bronze, San Diego)

== Exhibitions ==
- August 22 until September 29 - The De Luxe Show curated by Peter Bradley at the De Luxe movie theater in Houston, Texas sponsored by the Menil Foundation.

== Births ==
- January 4 – Junichi Kakizaki, Japanese floral artist and sculptor
- May 9 – Nicolas Ghesquière, French fashion designer
- June 1 – Miguel Calderón, Mexican visual artist and performer
- June 13 - Joshua Davis, American visual artist and designer
- September 2 – Arnold Arre, Filipino comic book writer and artist
- September 7 – Sirpa Masalin, Finnish sculptor
- September 13 – Stella McCartney, English fashion designer
- October 1 – Stéphane Breitwieser, French art thief
- October 4 – Jeremy Blake, American digital artist and painter (died 2007)
- October 16 – Mirko Reisser (DAIM), German graffiti-artist
- October 27 – Jade Arcade, American composer, musician, and comic book artist
- December 6 – Helena Bulaja, Croatian multimedia artist
- date unknown
  - Ahmed Al Safi, Iraqi sculptor
  - Amanda Coogan, Irish performance artist
  - Bernhard Gál, Austrian composer and artist

== Deaths ==
- January 10 – Coco Chanel, French fashion designer (born 1883)
- January 11 – I. Rice Pereira, American painter, (born 1902)
- February 1 – Raoul Hausmann, Austrian artist and writer (born 1886)
- February 7 – Emy Roeder, German sculptor (born 1890)
- April 1 – Ramiro Arrue, Basque painter, illustrator, and ceramist (born 1892)
- April 3 – Jacques Ochs, French artist, Olympic fencing gold medallist (born 1883)
- April 4 – Fritz Skade, German painter (born 1898)
- April 11 – Marcel Gromaire, French painter (born 1892)
- May 31 – Norman Wilkinson, English marine artist (born 1878)
- June 14 – Gerald Dillon, Irish painter (born 1916)
- July 7 – Ub Iwerks, American animator, cartoonist and special effects technician (born 1901)
- July 10 – George Kenner, German artist (born 1888)
- July 12 – Kiyoshi Yamashita, Japanese outsider artist (born 1922)
- August 27 – Margaret Bourke-White, American photographer and photojournalist (born 1904)
- October – Charles Walter Simpson, English painter of nature and teacher (born 1885)
- November 9 – Ceri Richards, Welsh painter (born 1903)
- December 6 – Jan Altink, Dutch painter (born 1885)

== See also ==
- 1971 in fine arts of the Soviet Union
