= Place des Martyrs =

Place des Martyrs (French for Martyrs' Square) may refer to:

== Places ==
- Place des Martyrs, Algiers, Algeria
- Place des Martyrs, Beirut, Lebanon
- Place des Martyrs, Brussels, Belgium
- Place des Martyrs, Kisangani, Congo
- Place des Martyrs, Luxembourg, Luxembourg
- Place des Martyrs, Verviers, Belgium
- Place des Martyrs, Lomé, Togo

== Other ==
- Place des Martyres, a series of paintings by Nabil Kanso
