= John Cabot =

Italian navigator and explorer (c. 1450 – c. 1500)

- Giovanni Caboto
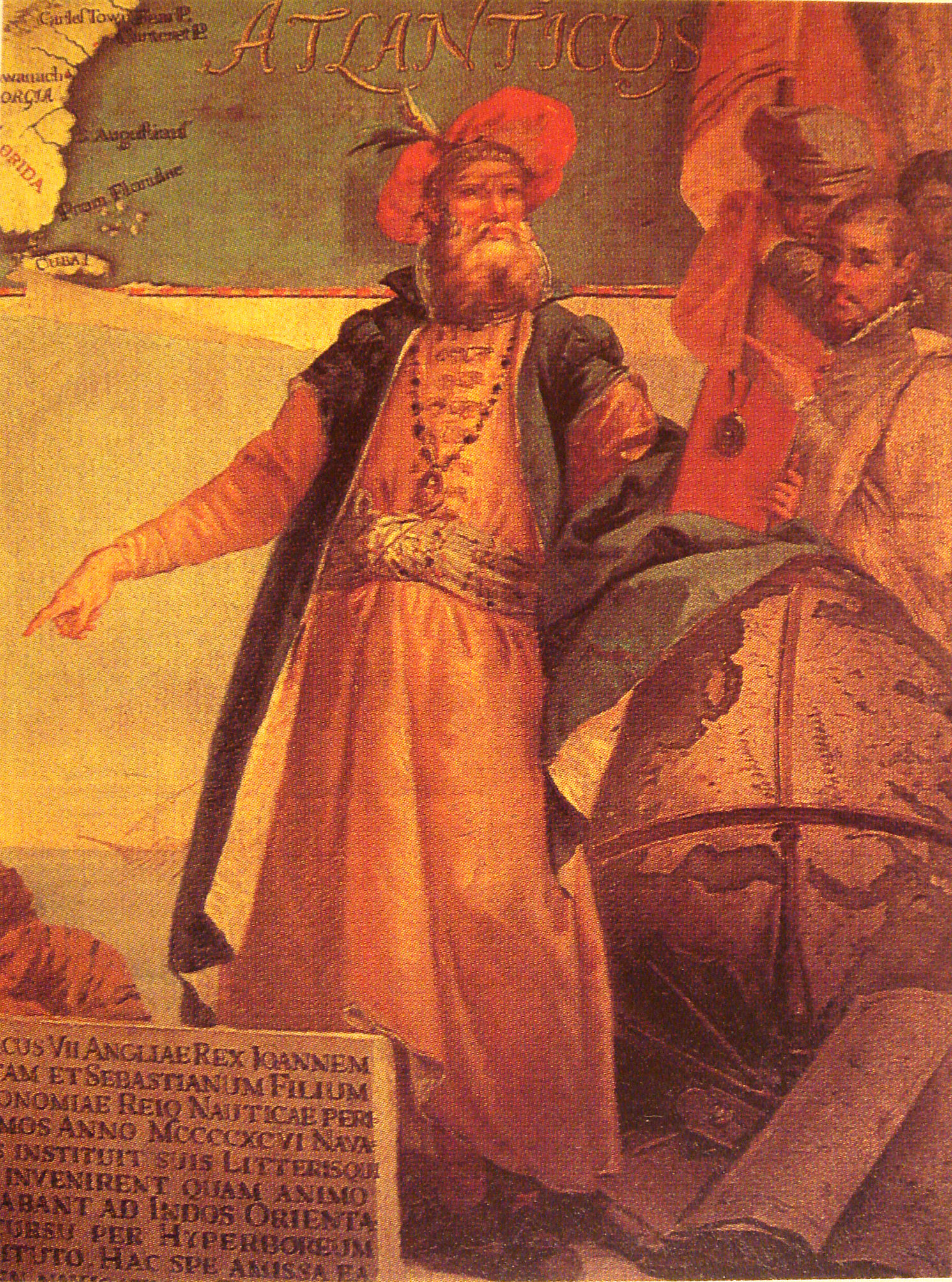
- John Cabot in traditional Venetian garb – mural painting by Giustino Menescardi (1762), in the Sala dello Scudo in the Doge's Palace, Venice
- Born: c. 1450; Gaeta or Castiglione Chiavarese
- Died: c. 1499
- Other names: Zuan Chabotto, Giovanni Chabotte, Juan Caboto, Jean Caboto
- Citizenship: Republic of Venice
- Occupations: Maritime explorer
- Known for: First European since the Norse colonization of North America to explore coastal parts of North America
- Spouse: Mattea (m. circa 1470)
- Children: Ludovico, Sebastiano, and Sancto
- Relatives: Catalina de Medrano (daughter-in-law)

Giovanni Caboto (Italian: Giovanni Caboto [dʒoˈvanni kaˈbɔːto]; c. 1450 – c. 1499), traditionally known in English as John Cabot (English: /ˈkæbət/), was an Italian navigator and explorer. His 1497 voyage to the coast of North America under the commission of Henry VII, King of England is the earliest known European exploration of coastal North America since the Norse visits to Vinland in the eleventh century. To mark the celebration of the 500th anniversary of Cabot's expedition, both the Canadian and British governments declared Cape Bonavista, Newfoundland as representing Cabot's first landing site. However, alternative locations have also been proposed.

== Name and origins ==
Giovanni Caboto is known today as John Cabot in English, Zuan Caboto in Venetian and Jean Cabot in French. This resulted from a once-ubiquitous European tradition of nativizing names in local documents, something often adhered to by the actual persons themselves. This same tradition is why Cristoforo Colombo is usually called Christopher Columbus in English. (Many European names have shared origins which diverged culturally and linguistically, e.g. Charles rendered in German becomes Carl or Karl, and Jacques rendered in English becomes James.) Cabot signed his name as "Zuan Chabotto" in Venice, Zuan being a form of John typical to Venice. He continued to use this form in England, at least among Italians. He was referred to by his Italian banker in London as "Giovanni", in the only known contemporaneous document to use this version of his first name.

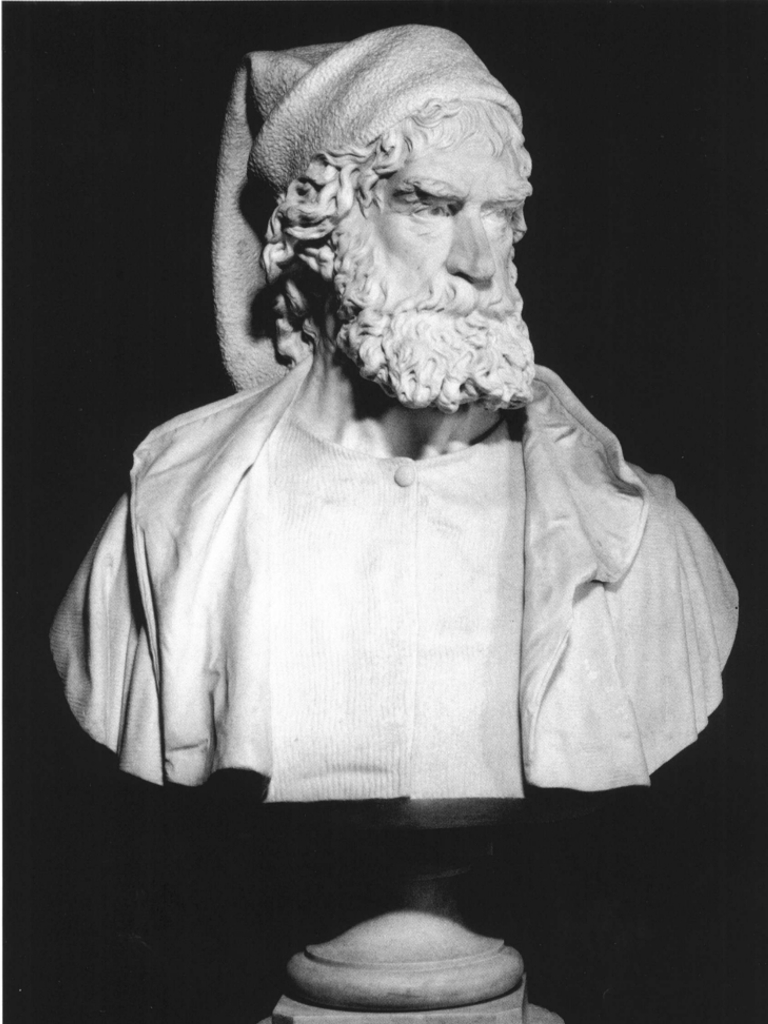
Giovanni Cabot bust

His surname, derived from the Latin caput (= head), refers to a type of fish, and was perhaps a nickname which became hereditary.

Cabot was born in Italy, the son of Giulio Caboto and his wife; he had a brother Piero. Gaeta (in the Province of Latina) and Castiglione Chiavarese (in the Province of Genoa) have both been proposed as his birthplace. The main evidence for Gaeta are records of a Caboto family residing there until the mid-15th century, but ceasing to be traceable after 1443.

Pedro de Ayala, the Spanish envoy and Cabot's contemporary in London, described him in a letter to the Spanish Crown in 1498 as "another Genoese like Columbus". John Cabot's son, Sebastian, said his father originally came from Genoa. Cabot was made a citizen of the Republic of Venice in 1476; as citizenship required a minimum of fifteen years' residency in the city, he must have lived in Venice from at least 1461.

== Early life ==
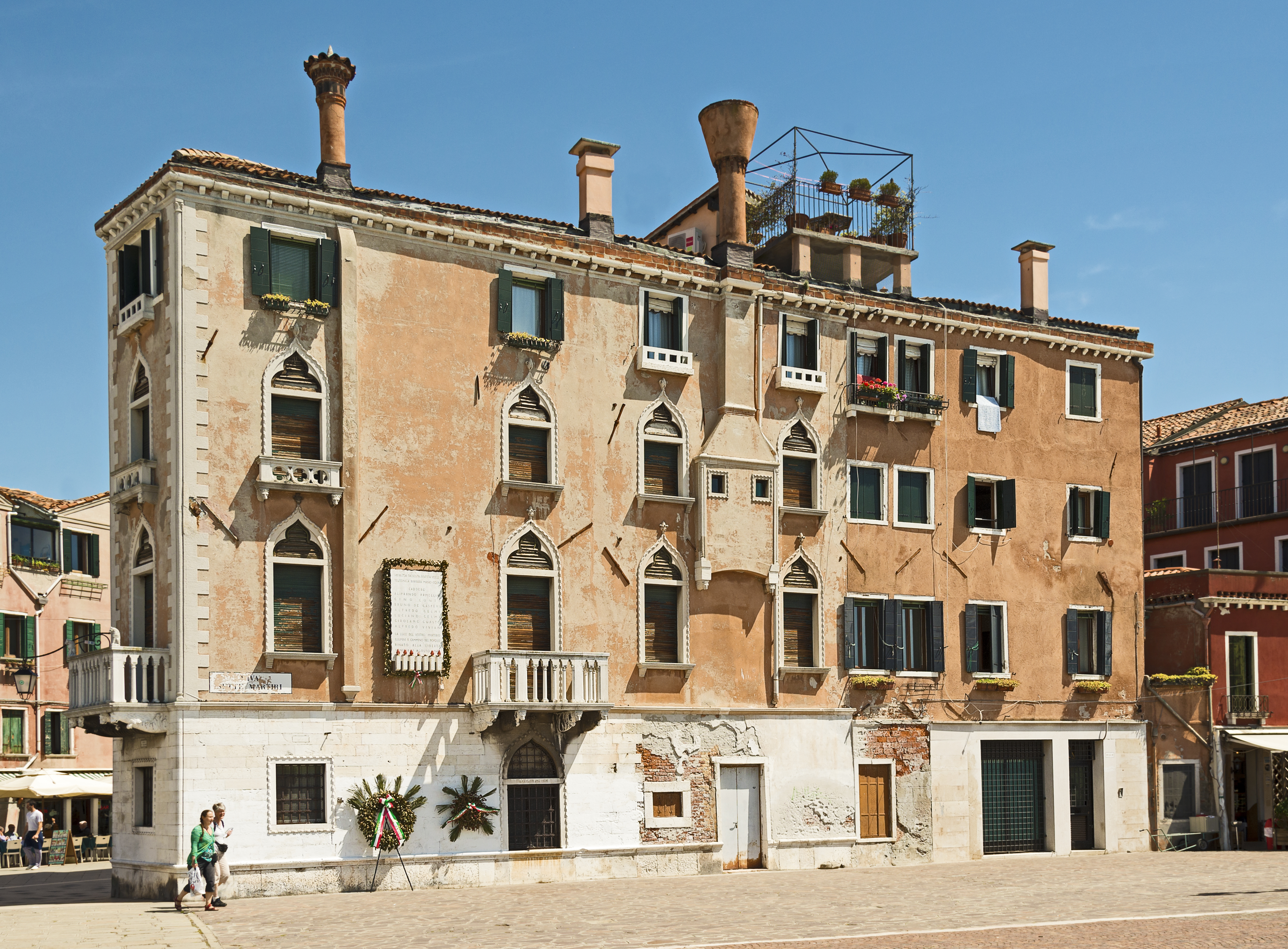
Giovanni Caboto's house in Venice

Cabot may have been born slightly earlier than 1450, which is the approximate date most commonly given for his birth. In 1471 Cabot was accepted into the religious confraternity of the Scuola Grande di San Giovanni Evangelista. Since this was one of the city's prestigious confraternities, his acceptance suggests that he was already a respected member of the community.

Once he gained full Venetian citizenship in 1476, Cabot would have been eligible to engage in maritime trade, including the trade to the eastern Mediterranean that was the source of much of Venice's wealth. He presumably entered this trade shortly thereafter. A 1483 document refers to his selling a slave in Crete whom he had acquired while in the territories of the Sultan of Egypt, which then comprised most of what is now Israel, Syria and Lebanon.This is not sufficient to prove Cabot's later assertion that he had visited Mecca, which he said in 1497 to the Milanese ambassador in London. In this Mediterranean trade, he may have acquired better knowledge of the origins of the Eastern merchandise he would have been dealing in (such as spices and silks) than most Europeans at that time.

"Zuan Cabotto" is mentioned in a variety of Venetian records of the late 1480s. These indicate that by 1484 he was married to Mattea and already had multiple sons. His sons were Ludovico, Sebastian and Sancto. The Venetian sources contain references to Cabot's being involved in house building in the city. He may have relied on this experience when seeking work later in Spain as a civil engineer.

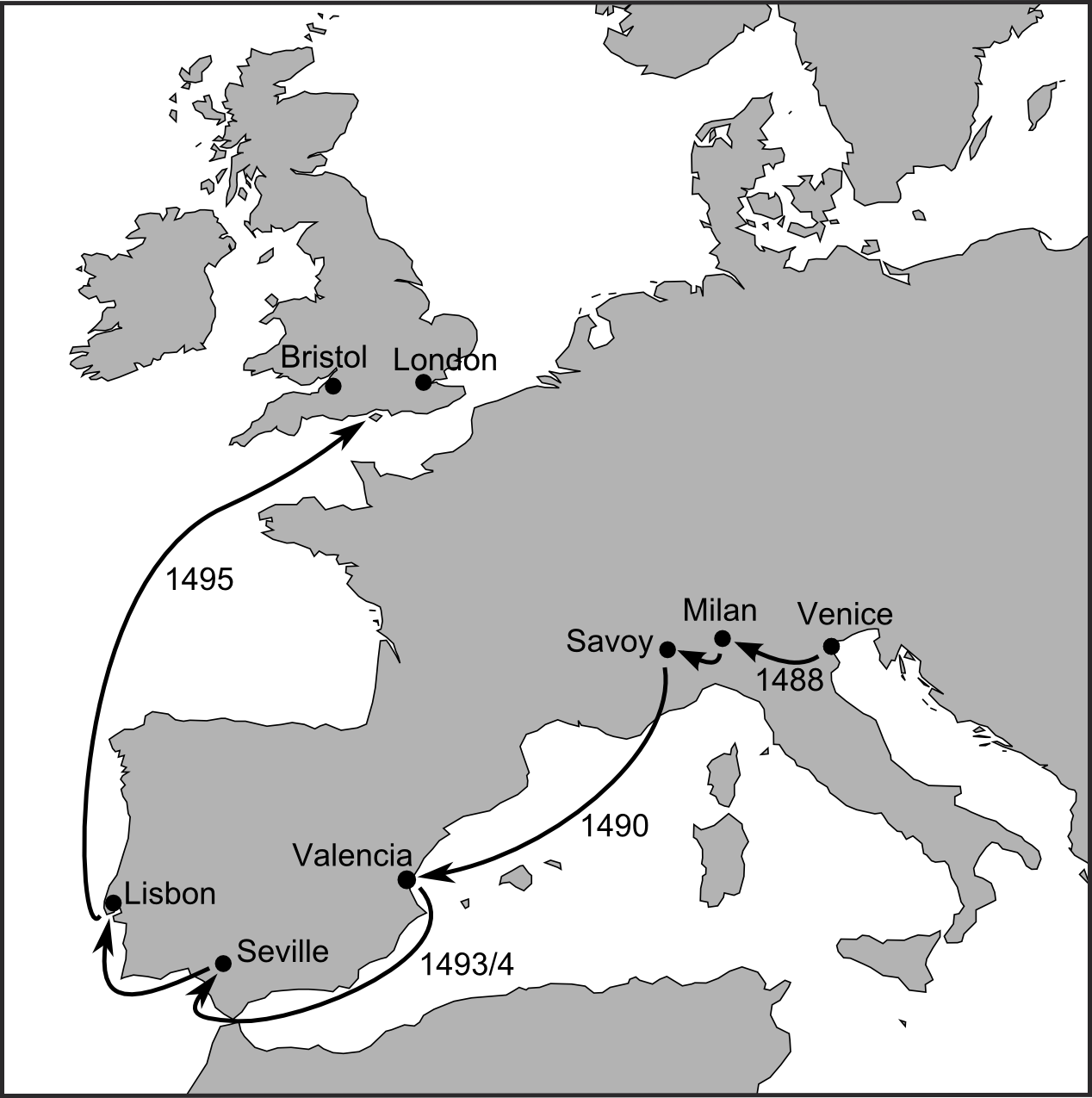
Cabot's travels around Europe, 1488–95, following his escape from Venice

Cabot appears to have got into financial trouble in the late 1480s and left Venice as an insolvent debtor by 5 November 1488. He moved to Valencia, Spain, where his creditors attempted to have him arrested by sending a lettera di raccomandazione a giustizia ("a letter of recommendation to justice") to the authorities. While in Valencia, "John Cabot Montecalunya" (as he is referred to in local documents) proposed plans for improvements to the harbour. These proposals were rejected, however. Early in 1494 he moved on to Seville, where he proposed the construction of a stone bridge over the Guadalquivir river. He was contracted to build it and worked on the project for five months, until the bridge was abandoned following a decision of the City Council on 24 December 1494. After this Cabot appears to have sought support in Seville and Lisbon for an Atlantic expedition, before moving to London to seek funding and political support. He probably reached England in mid-1495.

== Sponsorship ==
Cabot sought financing and royal patronage in England. Cabot planned to depart to the west from a northerly latitude in search of a northern passage to Asia.

Historians had thought that, on arrival in England, Cabot went to Bristol, a major maritime centre, to seek financial backers. This was the only English city to have had a history of undertaking exploratory expeditions into the Atlantic. Cabot's royal patent, issued by the Crown in 1496, stated that all expeditions should be undertaken from Bristol, so his primary financial supporters were probably based in that city. In any case, it also stipulated that the commerce resulting from any discoveries must be conducted with England alone, with goods being brought in only through Bristol. Although those goods would be free of other duties, the King was to receive one-fifth of the profit. This would have made Bristol into a monopoly port, with sole right to engage in colonial trade. In stating this, Henry VII of England was presumably influenced by Iberian practices: Portugal having made Lisbon into such a monopoly port, while Spain was in the process of doing the same thing with Seville.

In the late 20th century, British historian Alwyn Ruddock found documentation that Cabot went first to London, where he received some financial backing from its Italian community. She suggested one patron was Father Giovanni Antonio de Carbonariis, an Augustinian friar who was also the deputy to Adriano Castellesi, the papal tax collector. Ruddock also suggested that Carbonariis accompanied Cabot's 1498 expedition. She further suggested that the friar, on good terms with the King, introduced the explorer to King Henry VII. Beyond this, Ruddock stated that Cabot received a loan from an Italian banking house in London. As Ruddock ordered the destruction of all her research notes on her death in 2005, scholars have had to duplicate her research and rediscover documents. The Cabot Project was formed at the University of Bristol in 2009 to research Cabot and the Bristol expeditions. Francesco Guidi Bruscoli, of the University of Florence, found some of Ruddock's documentation, confirming that Cabot received money in March 1496 from the Bardi family banking firm of Florence. The bankers located in London provided fifty nobles (£16 13s. 4d.) to support Cabot's expedition to "go and find the new land". This payment from the Florentine merchants would have represented a substantial contribution, although it was not enough to finance the expedition completely.

On 5 March 1496 Henry VII gave Cabot and his three sons letters patent with the following charge for exploration:

... free authority, faculty and power to sail to all parts, regions, and coasts of the eastern, western and northern sea, under our banners, flags, and ensigns, with five ships or vessels of whatsoever burden and quality they may be, and with so many and with such mariners and men as they may wish to take with them in the said ships, at their own proper costs and charges, to find, discover and investigate whatsoever islands, countries, regions or provinces of heathens and infidels, in whatsoever part of the world placed, which before this time were unknown to all Christians.

Those who received such patents had the right to assign them to third parties for execution. His sons are believed to have still been minors at that time.

== Expeditions ==
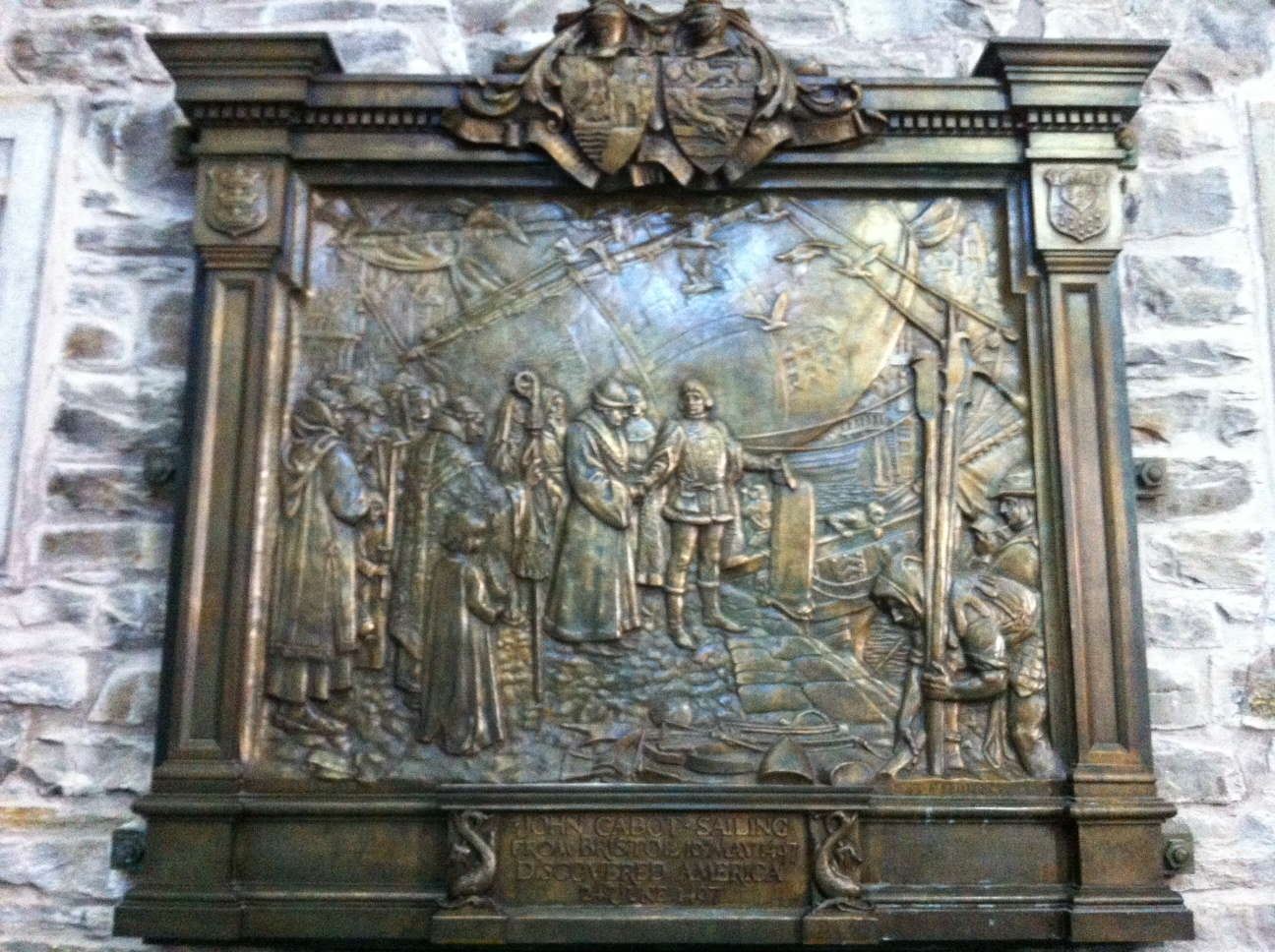
John Cabot plaque showing Cabot departing Bristol, England for Atlantic Canada (1497), installed at Sir Sandford Fleming Park, Halifax, Nova Scotia

Cabot went to Bristol to arrange preparations for his voyage. Bristol was the second-largest seaport in England. From 1480 onward it had supplied several expeditions to look for the mythical Hy-Brasil. According to Celtic legend, this island lay somewhere in the Atlantic Ocean.

There was a widespread belief among merchants in the port that Bristol men had discovered the island at an earlier date but had then lost track of it. In a private letter to a colleague (Prof. David B. Quinn), Ruddock maintained that she had found evidence in Italian archives that Bristol men had discovered North America before 1470. As the island was believed to be a source of brazilwood (from which a valuable red dye could be obtained), merchants had economic incentive to find it.

=== First voyage ===
Little was recorded of Cabot's first voyage. What is known as the "John Day letter", written by John Day, alias Hugh Say, a Bristol merchant originally of London, was sent during the winter of 1497–98 to an addressee believed to be Christopher Columbus. The letter refers briefly to this voyage but writes mostly about the second, 1497 expedition. Day noted: "Since your Lordship wants information relating to the first voyage, here is what happened: he went with one ship, his crew confused him, he was short of supplies and ran into bad weather, and he decided to turn back." Since Cabot received his royal patent in March 1496, it is believed that he made his first voyage that summer.

=== Second voyage ===
==== Sources ====
Information about the 1497 voyage comes mostly from four short letters and an entry in a 1565 chronicle of the city of Bristol (then often spelt Bristow). The chronicle entry for 1496–97 says in full:

This year, on St. John the Baptist's Day [24 June 1497], the land of America was found by the Merchants of Bristow in a shippe of Bristowe, called the Mathew; the which said ship departed from the port of Bristowe, the second day of May, and came home again the 6th of August next following.

The John Day letter of winter 1497–98 provides considerable information about Cabot's second voyage. Day is believed to have been familiar with the key figures of the expedition and thus able to report on it. If the lands Cabot had discovered lay west of the meridian laid down in the Treaty of Tordesillas, or if he intended to sail further west, Columbus would probably have believed that these voyages challenged his monopoly rights for westward exploration.

In addition to these letters, Alwyn Ruddock claimed to have found another, written on 10 August 1497 by the London-based bankers of Fr. Giovanni Antonio de Carbonariis. This letter has yet to be found. From various written comments made by Ruddock, the letter did not appear to contain a detailed account of the voyage. Ruddock said the letter contained "new evidence supporting the claim that seamen of Bristol had already discovered land across the ocean before John Cabot's arrival in England." She contended that Bristol seamen had reached North America two decades before Cabot's expedition.

==== Details of the voyage ====
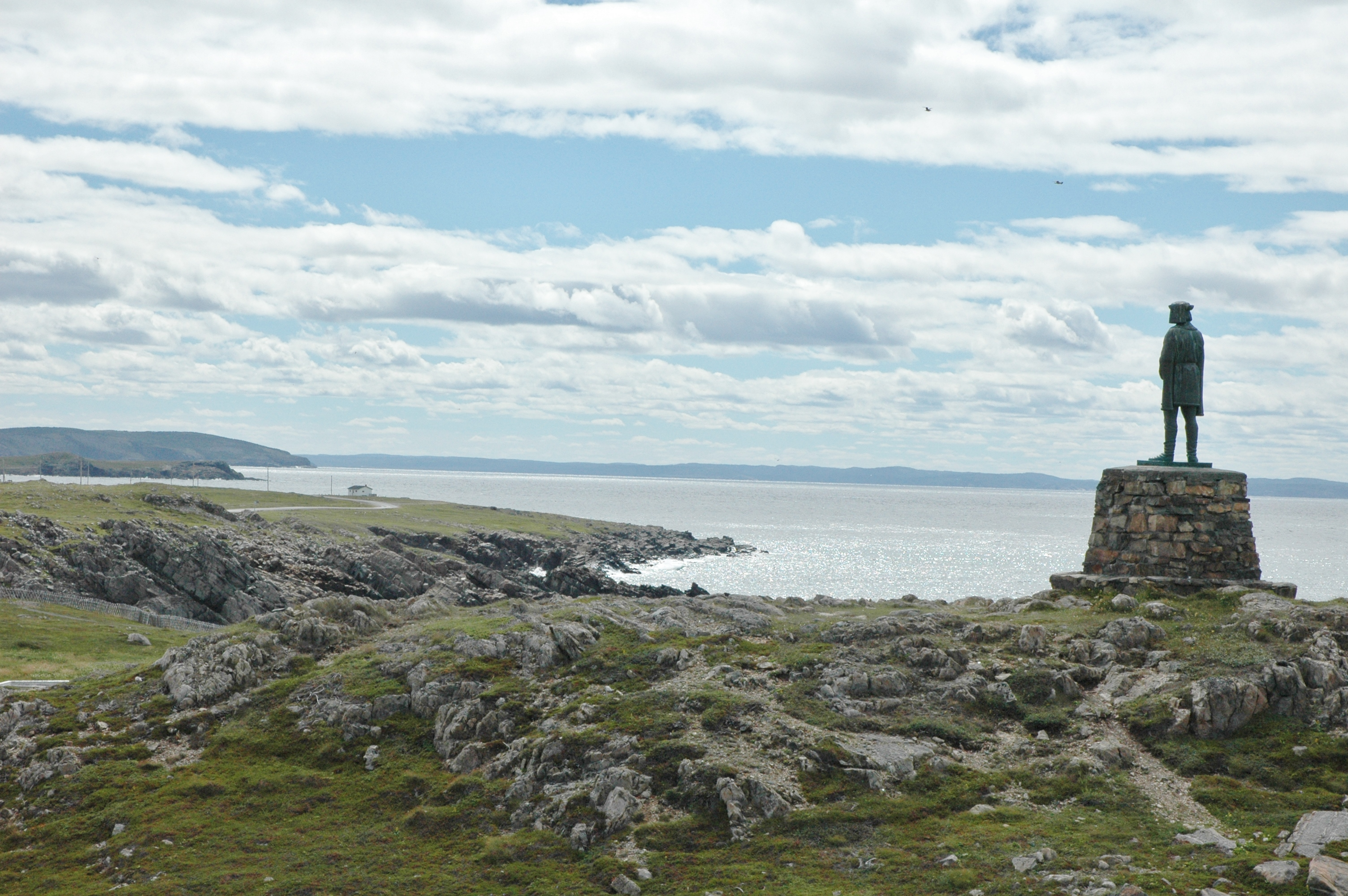
A statue of John Cabot gazing across Bonavista Bay in eastern Newfoundland

The known sources do not concur on all aspects of the events, and none can be assumed to be entirely reliable. Cabot was described as having one "little ship", of 50 tons' burden, called Matthew of Bristol (according to the 1565 chronicle). It was said to be laden with sufficient supplies for "seven or eight months". The ship departed in May with a crew of 18 to 20 men. They included an unnamed Burgundian (modern-day Netherlands) and a Genoese barber surgeon, who presumably accompanied the expedition as the ship's surgeon (barbers in that era also routinely performed dentistry and minor surgery).

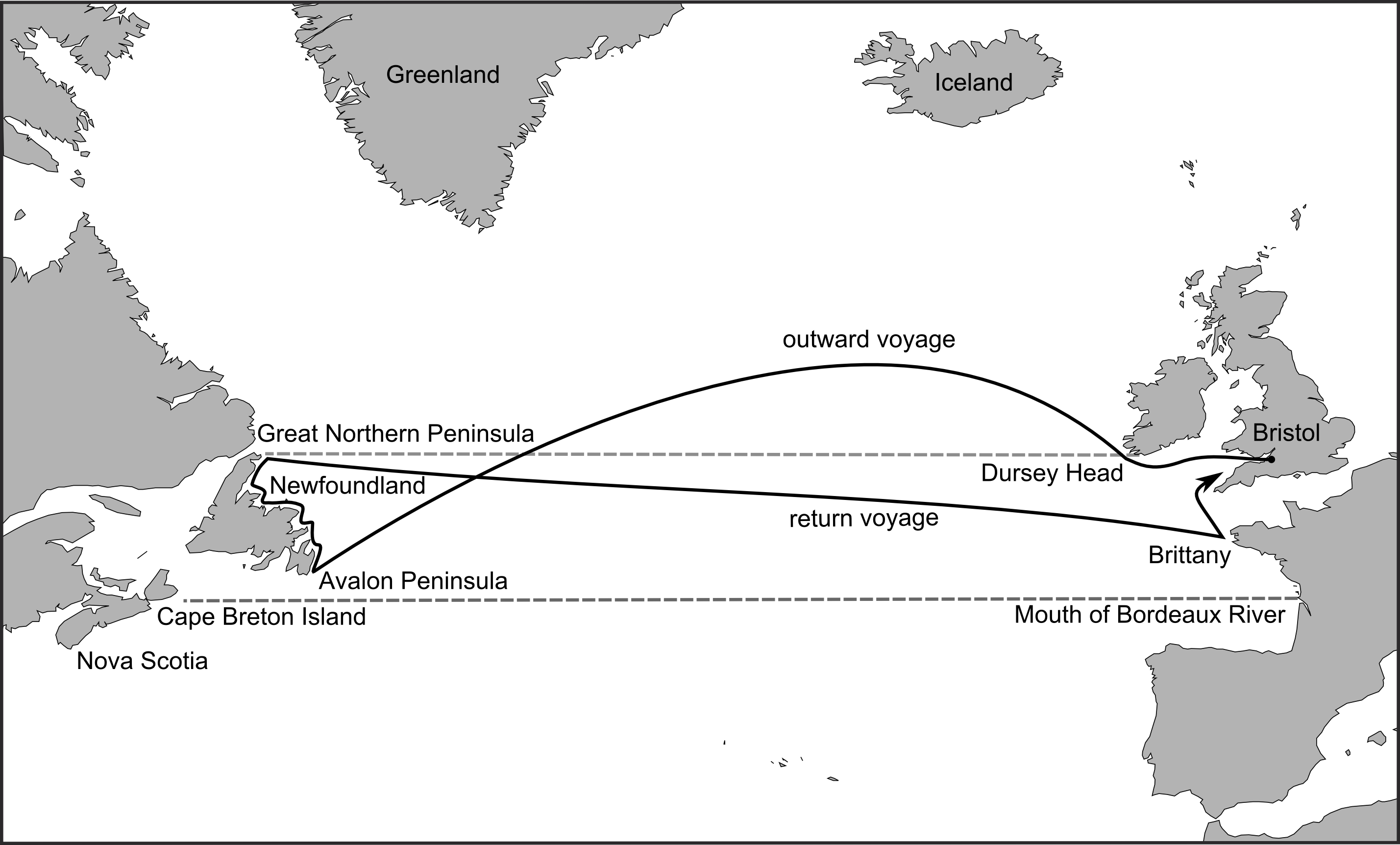
Route of 1497 voyage posited by Jones and Condon

It is likely that two ranking Bristol merchants were part of the expedition. One was William Weston, who had not been identified as part of Cabot's expedition before the discovery of a new document in the late 20th century by historian Margaret Condon. In 2009, historian Evan Jones published this document: a letter from Henry VII ordering the suspension of legal proceedings against Weston because it was the King's intent that Weston would shortly undertake a voyage for the King to the "new founde land". This was probably the voyage under Cabot's patent, making William Weston the first Englishman to lead an expedition to North America. In 2018, Condon and Jones published a further article that showed that Weston and Cabot had been jointly rewarded by the king in January 1498, suggesting that the explorers were working together before the start of the second voyage. The same article revealed that Weston received a £30 reward after he returned from his successful 1499 voyage.

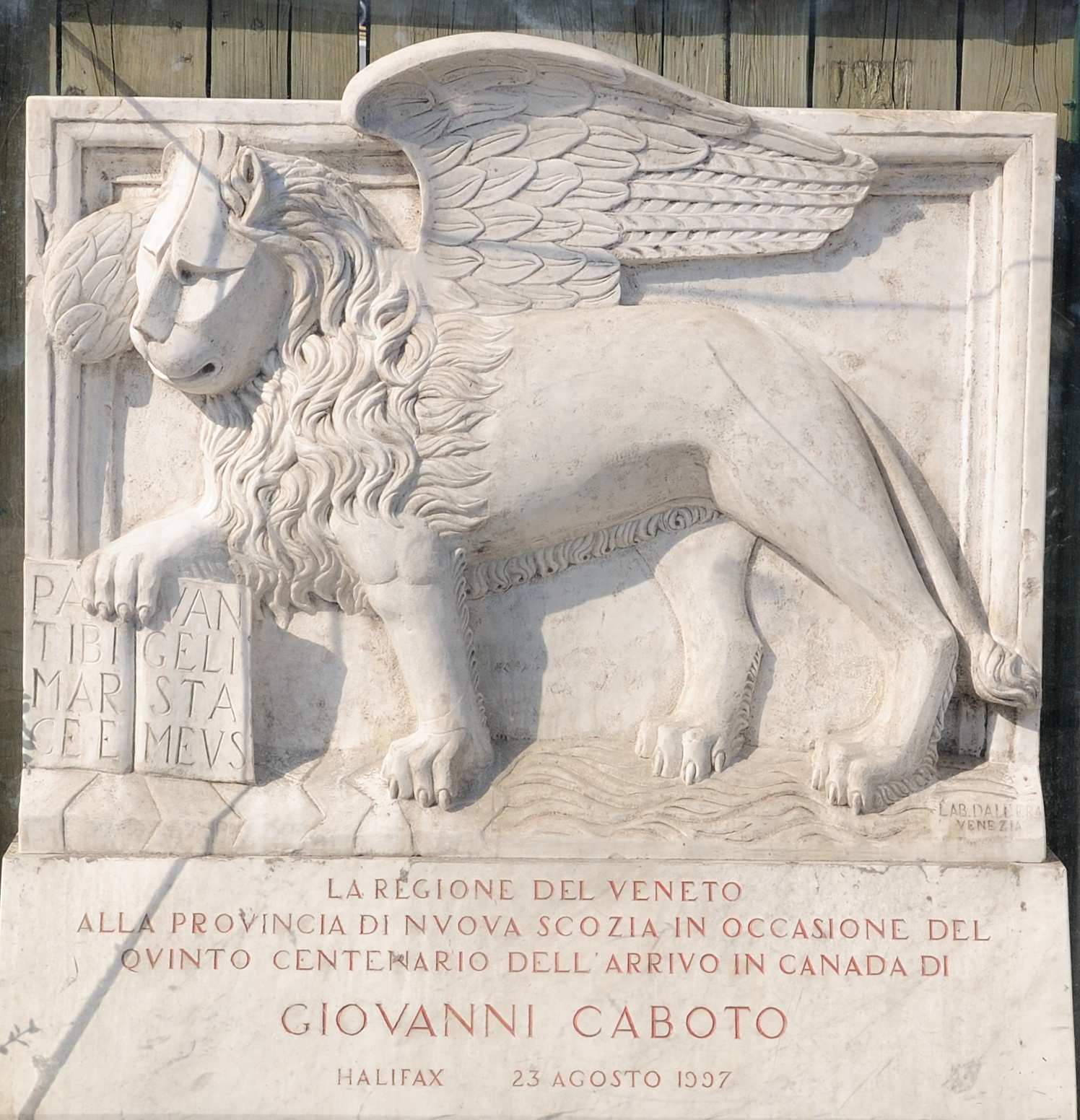
Quincentennial commemorative sculpture showing the Lion of St Mark, a symbol of Venice, given to Halifax, Nova Scotia by the regional government of Veneto in memory of John Cabot's 1497 voyage

Leaving Bristol, the expedition sailed past Ireland and across the Atlantic, making landfall somewhere on the coast of North America on 24 June 1497. The exact location of the landfall has long been disputed, with different communities vying for the honor. Historians have proposed Cape Bonavista and St. John's, Newfoundland; Cape Breton Island, Nova Scotia; Labrador; and Maine as possibilities. Since the discovery of the John Day letter in the 1950s, it seems most likely that the initial landfall was either on Newfoundland or nearby Cape Breton Island. This is because Day's letter implies that the coastline explored in 1497 lay between the latitudes of Bordeaux, France and Dursey Head in southern Ireland. The initial landfall seems to have taken place close to the southern latitude, with the expedition returning home after reaching the northern one.

==== Landing ====
For the 500th-anniversary celebrations, the governments of Canada and the United Kingdom designated Cape Bonavista in Newfoundland as the "official" landing place. Here in 1997, Queen Elizabeth II along with members of the Italian and Canadian governments greeted the replica Matthew of Bristol, following her celebratory crossing of the Atlantic.

Cabot is reported to have landed only once during the expedition and did not advance "beyond the shooting distance of a crossbow". Pasqualigo and Day both state that the expedition made no contact with any native people; the crew found the remains of a fire, a human trail, nets, and a wooden tool. The crew appeared to have remained on land just long enough to take on fresh water; they also raised the Venetian and Papal banners, claiming the land for the King of England and recognising the religious authority of the Roman Catholic Church. After this landing, Cabot spent some weeks "discovering the coast", with most "discovered after turning back".

=== Celebration ===
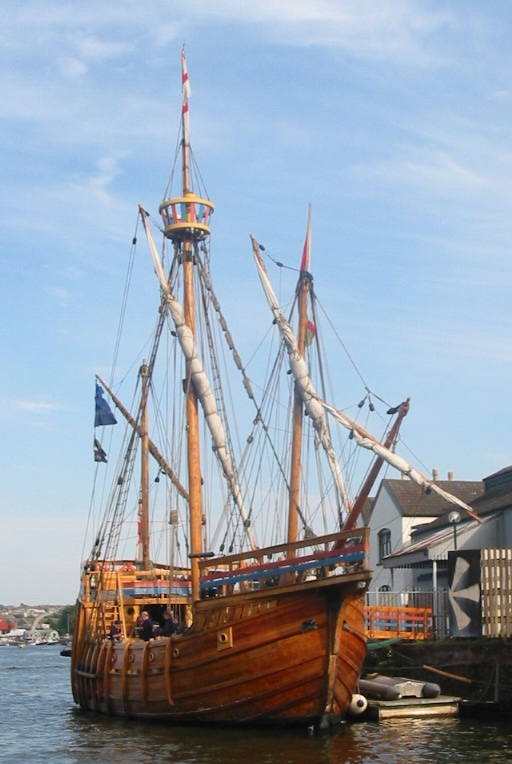
A replica of the Matthew in Bristol

On return to Bristol, Cabot rode to London to report to the king. On 10 August 1497, he was given a reward of £10—equivalent to about two years' pay for an ordinary labourer or craftsman.

The explorer was fêted; Soncino wrote on 23 August that, similar to Christopher Columbus, Cabot "is called the Great Admiral, and vast honour is paid to him and he goes dressed in silk, and these English run after him like mad". Such adulation was short-lived, for over the next few months the king's attention was occupied by the second Cornish uprising of 1497.

Once Henry's throne was secure, he gave more thought to Cabot. On 26 September, just a few days after the collapse of the revolt, the king made an award of £2 to Cabot. On 13 December 1497, the explorer was awarded a pension (or salary) of £20 per year. This was to be payable from customs receipts collected in Bristol. The pension was backdated to March 1497, to make clear that Cabot was in the king's service at the time of his expedition. Despite the royal grant, Bristol's customs officers initially refused to pay Cabot his pension, forcing the explorer to obtain an additional warrant from the king. On 3 February 1498, Cabot was given new letters patent covering the voyage and to help him prepare another expedition.

In March and April, the king also advanced a number of loans to Lancelot Thirkill of London, Thomas Bradley, and John Cair, who were to accompany Cabot's new expedition.

=== Final voyage ===
The Great Chronicle of London (1189–1512) reports that Cabot departed with a fleet of five ships from Bristol at the beginning of May 1498, one of which had been prepared by the king. Some of the ships were said to be carrying merchandise, including cloth, caps, lace points, and other "trifles".

This suggests that Cabot intended to engage in trade on this expedition. The Spanish envoy in London reported in July that one of the ships had been caught in a storm and been forced to land in Ireland, but that Cabot and the other four ships had continued on.

For centuries, no other records were found (or at least published) that relate to this expedition; it was long believed that Cabot and his fleet were lost at sea. However, at least one of the men scheduled to accompany the expedition, Lancelot Thirkill, is recorded as living in London in 1501.

It is not known whether Cabot died during the voyage, returned safely and died shortly after, or arrived in the Americas and chose to remain there, perhaps remaining with the Indigenous people in a similar manner to Étienne Brûlé.

The historian Alwyn Ruddock studied Cabot and his era for 35 years. She suggested that Cabot and his expedition successfully returned to England in the spring of 1500. She claimed their return followed an epic two-year exploration of the east coast of North America, south into the Chesapeake Bay area and perhaps as far as the Spanish territories in the Caribbean. Her evidence included the well-known world map of the Spanish cartographer Juan de la Cosa. His chart included the North American coast and seas "discovered by the English" between 1497 and 1500.

Ruddock suggested that Giovanni Antonio de Carbonariis and the other friars who accompanied the 1498 expedition had stayed in Newfoundland and founded a mission. If Carbonariis founded a settlement in North America, it would have been the first Christian settlement on the continent and may have included a church, the only medieval church to have been built there since the Norse settlements in Greenland.

The Cabot Project at the University of Bristol was organized in 2009 to search for the evidence on which Ruddock's claims rest, as well as to undertake related studies of Cabot and his expeditions. The lead researchers on the project, Evan Jones and Margaret Condon, claim to have found further evidence to support aspects of Ruddock's case, including some of the information she intended to use to argue for a successful return of the 1498 expedition to Bristol. These appear to place John Cabot in London by May 1500, although Jones and Condon have yet to publish their documentation.

The project is collaborating on an archaeological excavation at the community of Carbonear, Newfoundland, located at Conception Bay and believed the likely location for Carbonariis's possible mission settlement. The Archaeology of Historic Carbonear Project, carried out by Memorial University of Newfoundland, has conducted summer fieldwork each season since 2011. So far, it has found evidence of planter habitation since the late 17th century and of trade with Spain through Bilbao, including a Spanish coin minted in Peru.

== Additional English voyages ==
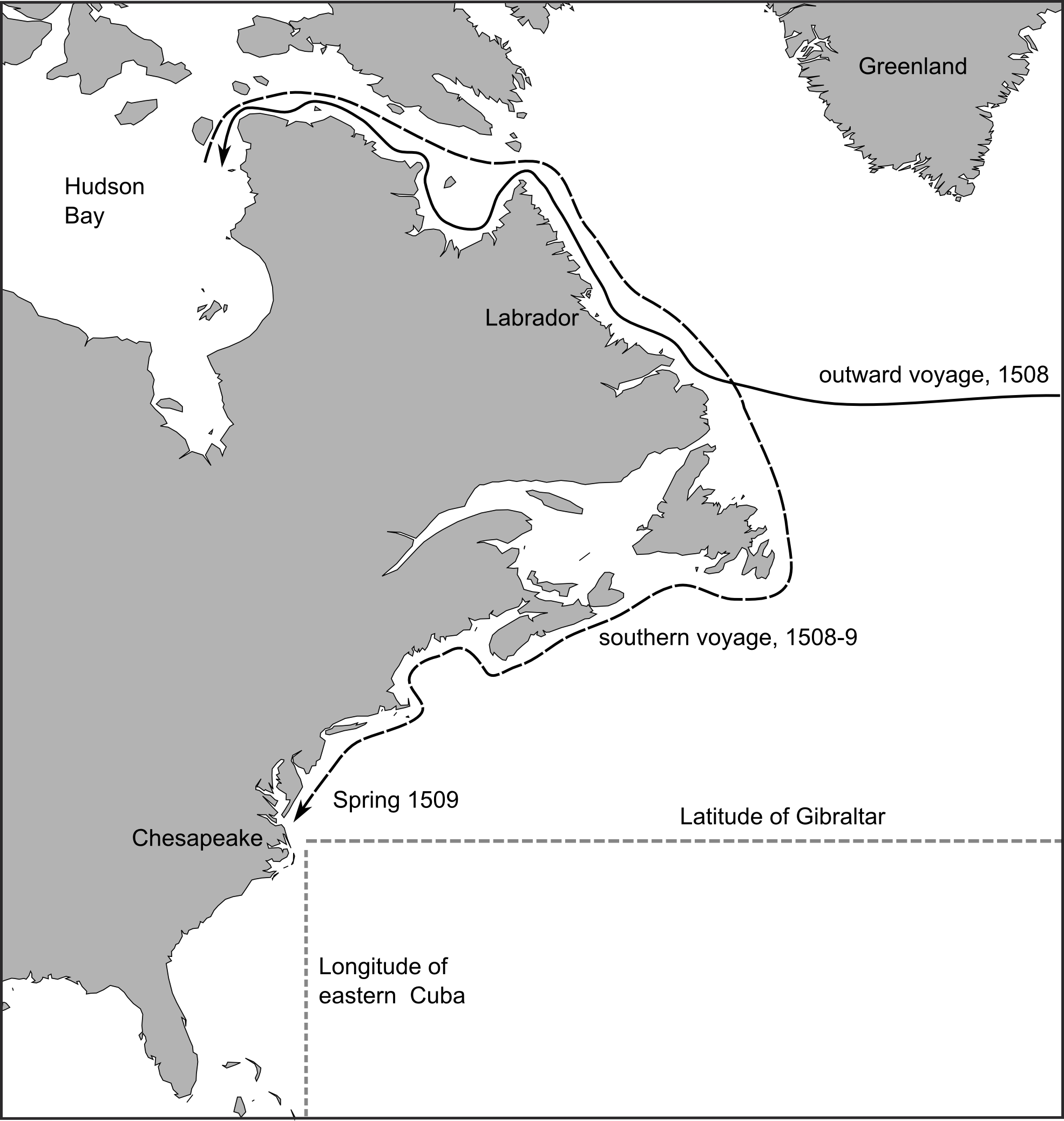
Presumed course of Sebastian Cabot's voyage of 1508–09, based on Peter Martyr's 1516 account and subsequent references to it

Ruddock claimed that William Weston of Bristol, a supporter of Cabot, undertook an independent expedition to North America in 1499, sailing north from Newfoundland up to the Hudson Strait. If correct, this was probably the first Northwest Passage expedition. In 2009, Jones confirmed that William Weston (who was not previously known to have been involved) led an expedition from Bristol [with royal support] to the "new found land" in 1499 or 1500, making him the first Englishman to lead the exploration of North America. This find has changed the understanding of English roles in exploration of that continent. In 2018, Condon and Jones published a further article about William Weston. This revealed that Weston and Cabot had received rewards from King Henry VII in January 1498, following a royal audience, thereby confirming that the two explorers were involved by this stage. Condon and Jones also revealed that in 1500 the King rewarded Weston £30 for "his expenses about the finding of the new land".

King Henry VII continued to support exploration from Bristol. The king granted Hugh Eliot, Robert Thorne, and his son a bounty of £20 in January 1502 for purchasing the Gabriel, a ship for an expedition voyage that summer. Later in 1502 or early 1503, he paid Eliot a reward of £100 for a voyage, or voyages, in "2 ships to the Isle of new finding," as Newfoundland was called. This amount was larger than any previously accounted for in royal support of the explorations. Around this time the Bristol-based explorers established a formal company, backed by Letters Patent, called the Company Adventurers to the New Found Land. This conducted further expeditions in 1503 and 1504.

In 1508–09, Sebastian Cabot undertook a final voyage to North America from Bristol. According to Peter Martyr's 1516 account, this expedition explored a section of the coast from the Hudson Bay to about Chesapeake Bay. Following his return to England in 1509, Sebastian found that his sponsor, Henry VII, had died and that the new king, Henry VIII, had little interest in westward exploration.

== Family ==
Cabot married Mattea around 1470, and had issue including three sons:

- Ludovico Caboto
- Sebastiano Caboto
- Santo Caboto

== Sebastian Cabot's voyages ==
Sebastian Cabot, one of John's sons, also became an explorer, later making at least one voyage to North America. In 1508 he was searching for the Northwest Passage. Nearly two decades later, he sailed to South America for Spain to repeat Ferdinand Magellan's voyage around the world. He became diverted by searching for silver along the Río de la Plata (1525–1528) in Argentina.

== Legacy and honors ==
External videos
- "John Cabot" – Historica Canada. – Heritage Minutes (1:01 min)

- Giovanni Caboto (1762), painting at Ducal Palace, Venice.
- Cabot Tower (1897) in St. John's, Newfoundland and Labrador, to commemorate the 400th anniversary of Cabot's voyage.
- Cabot Tower, in Bristol, England. A 30-metre-tall red sandstone tower begun in 1897 to mark the 400th anniversary.
- Denis William Eden painting: John Cabot and his sons receive the charter from Henry VII to sail in search of new lands (1910), at Houses of Parliament.
- Giovanni Caboto Club (est. 1925), an Italian club located in Windsor, Ontario.
- A 1952 statue of the explorer is at Bristol's City Hall.
- John Cabot University is a United States-affiliated university established in 1972 in Rome, Italy.
- A 1985 bronze statue of the explorer by Stephen Joyce, is located at Bristol Harbourside.
- A replica of the Matthew of Bristol built to commemorate the 500th anniversary of the 1497 voyage, docked in Bristol.
- A second replica of the Matthew is located at Cape Bonavista.
- The scenic Cabot Trail in the Cape Breton Highlands is named after the explorer.
- John Cabot Academy is an independent school in Bristol, England.
- Cabot Ward was an electoral district in Bristol (abolished in 2016), indirectly named for the explorer and directly after the local Cabot Tower.
- Cabot Squares in London and Montreal.
- Cabot Circus, a 2008 shopping mall in Bristol, named as a result of a citywide poll.
- Cabot Street and Cabot Avenue in St. John's, Newfoundland and Labrador.
- A statue of the explorer stands at the Confederation Building, St. John's.
- A bronze statue of the explorer is located at Cape Bonavista, Newfoundland. Plaques in English, French and Italian commemorate the historic voyage.
- John Cabot Catholic Secondary School in Mississauga, Ontario, is named after the explorer.
- Giovanni Caboto park located in Edmonton, Alberta.
- The Cabot Institute for the Environment at the University of Bristol is named after him.
- In 1897, the Newfoundland Colony issued a postage stamp, and in 1947, the Dominion of Newfoundland issued a postage stamp, marking the 400th and 450th anniversaries of Cabot's voyage to that island, respectively.
- The United States Navy named 2 ships USS Cabot, a 14-gun brig in 1775 and a light aircraft carrier in 1943. Additionally, the aircraft carrier USS Lexington (CV-16), launched in 1942, was laid down as Cabot.

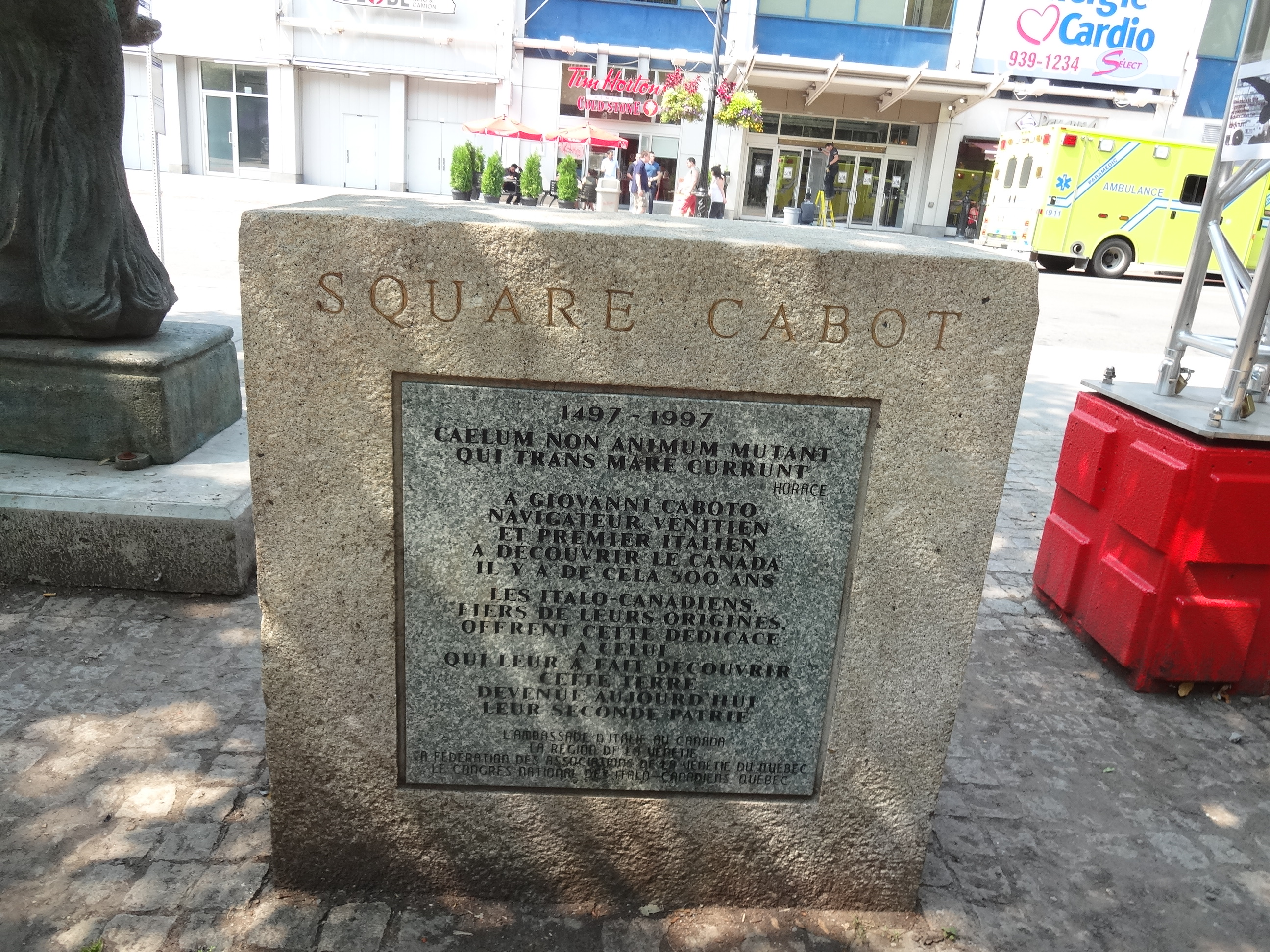
Square Cabot, Montreal

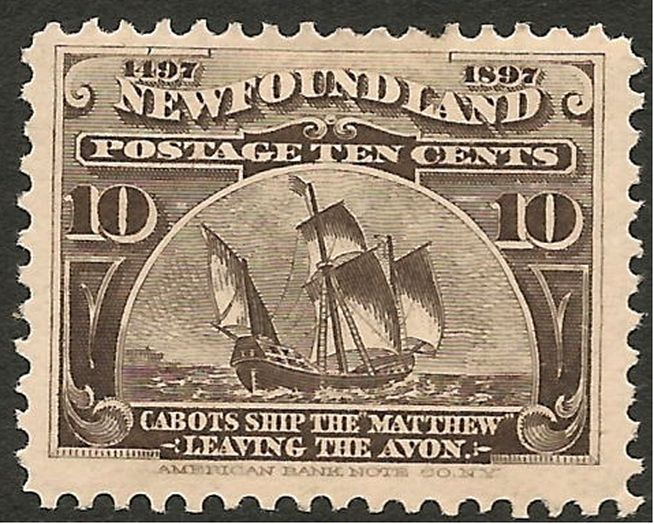
The Matthew: In 1897, on the 400th anniversary of Cabot's discovery of North America, the Newfoundland Post Office issued a commemorative stamp honouring Cabot and his discovery.

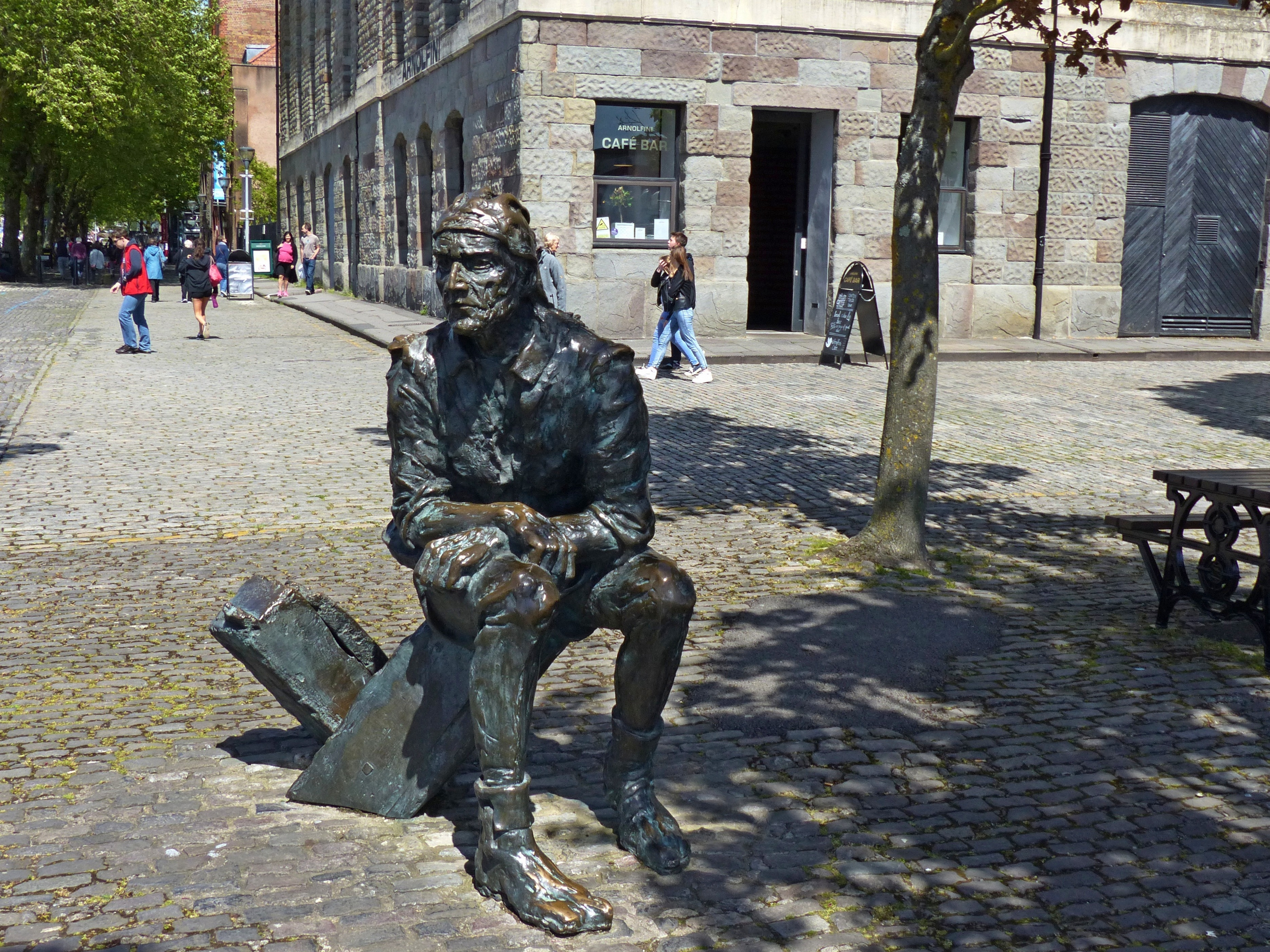
Statue of John Cabot at the Arnolfini Gallery, Bristol Harbourside, England. His 1497 voyage to North America left from Bristol.

== See also ==
- List of people who disappeared mysteriously at sea
