= William Weston (explorer) =

15th-century English merchant and explorer

- Born: c. 1445
- Died: c. 1504/05
- Occupation: merchant
- Known for: leading a voyage to Newfoundland
- Spouse: Agnes (née Foster)

William Weston, a 15th-century merchant from Bristol, was probably the first Englishman to lead an expedition to North America, the voyage taking place most likely in 1499 or 1500. Evidence of Weston's leadership has been discovered only in the early 21st century, and it changes interpretations of the discovery era.

He also believed to have been part of John Cabot's landmark 1497 expedition, the first confirmed European expedition to North America since the Vikings 500 years before.

== Life and background ==
William Weston is believed to have been born in Bristol, where he became a fairly minor merchant, trading mostly with Lisbon. He undertook one of the earliest English trading voyages to Madeira, a Portuguese archipelago in the Atlantic. This took place in 1480 and was likely intended as a way of gaining direct access to the sugar plantations of what was developing as an important Portuguese colony. In this period he also seems to have served as a purser or factor on the Trinity of Bristol, which was used for an expedition looking for the 'Isle of Brasil' in the Atlantic.

In February 1488 Weston was acting as the 'attorney' to the prominent Bristol merchant, John Foster. At this time Weston managed Foster's ship, the Anthony of Bristol, a vessel of about 380 tons burden. The greatest vessel in the Bristol fleet, the Anthony sank at Kingroad (Avonmouth) at the very end of a voyage to Lisbon, with Weston on board. Bristol's merchants blamed the maritime disaster on the negligence of the master. While it is unclear whether Weston was blamed, he subsequently became embroiled in a legal dispute relating to the wreck.

By 1492 Weston married Agnes Foster, daughter of merchant John Foster. Her father was known in Bristol as the founder of Foster's Almshouses. Weston and his wife lived at what is now 41 Corn Street.

It appears that Foster did not approve of his daughter's marriage to Weston, as Foster's 1492 will left nothing to his son-in-law and comparatively little to his daughter. The will included clauses that ensured that, if Agnes died before William, her inherited property would go to the almshouse rather than her husband. By the late 1490s, the Westons were in trouble for failing to pay the 'quit rent' on the Corn Street property, which Foster had ordered should be paid to help fund the almshouse. The executor of Foster's estate had prosecuted Weston successfully, which was to result in William and Agnes' eviction. It was to avoid this fate that William Weston appealed to the King, asking for a suspension of the legal proceedings until after he had undertaken his expedition to the new found land.

== Voyages of discovery ==
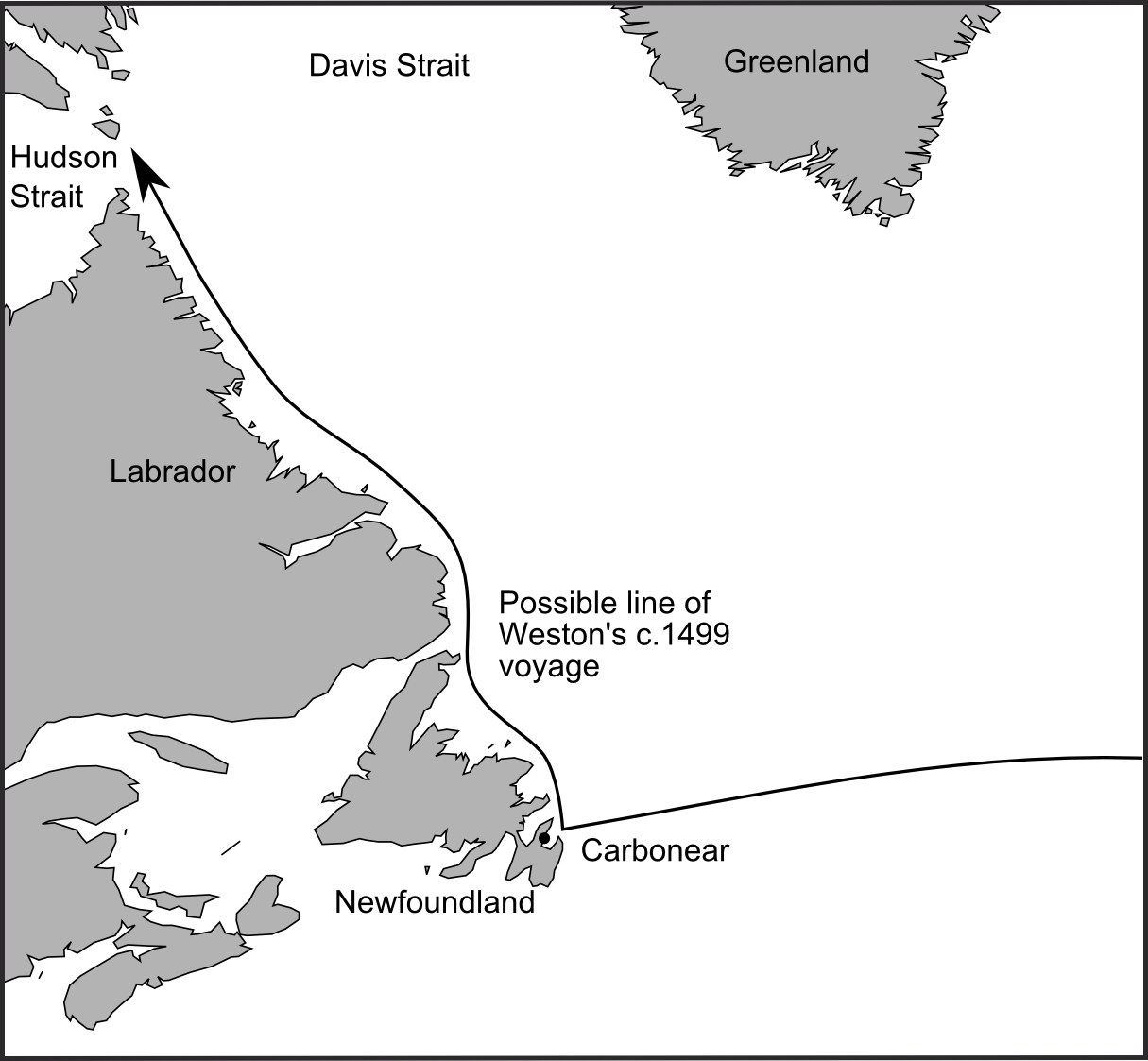
Suggested course of William Weston's voyage of c.1499, based on research by Alwyn Ruddock

It is not certain that Weston accompanied Cabot on his expeditions, but it seems probable as his own expedition was probably related to Cabot's assigning patent rights to him for exploration in 1499. Moreover, in January 1498 Cabot and Weston received rewards from King Henry VII, following a royal audience. This suggests the two were working together by this time, with Weston probably being one of the 'great seamen' and Bristol 'companions' of the Venetian explorer, discussed in a diplomatic correspondence of December 1497. In a letter to the Duke of Milan, the Milanese ambassador noted that some of Cabot's Bristol companions on his recent voyages had accompanied the Venetian to Court and had testified to the truth of the explorer's claims about the lands [North America] he had discovered in the summer of 1497.

While the exact year of Weston's independent voyage has yet to be determined, Jones and Condon suggest that it took place in 1499, a year after Cabot's final voyage. Dr Alwyn Ruddock had claimed that Weston's voyage went far up into the North West Atlantic, possibly reaching as far as the Hudson Strait. On her death in December 2005, however, Dr Ruddock left instructions for her research notes to be destroyed. Since the evidence on which she based this claim has not been located, scholars can not yet determine if she was correct about the extent of Weston's voyage. However, an article published in 2018 by Condon and Jones apparently confirms that the voyage took place, for in 1500 Weston received a reward of £30 from the king, 'pro expensis suis circa inuencionem noue terre' (for his expenses about the finding of the new land). This document was one of the 'new finds' Ruddock had located before them.

== Documentation ==
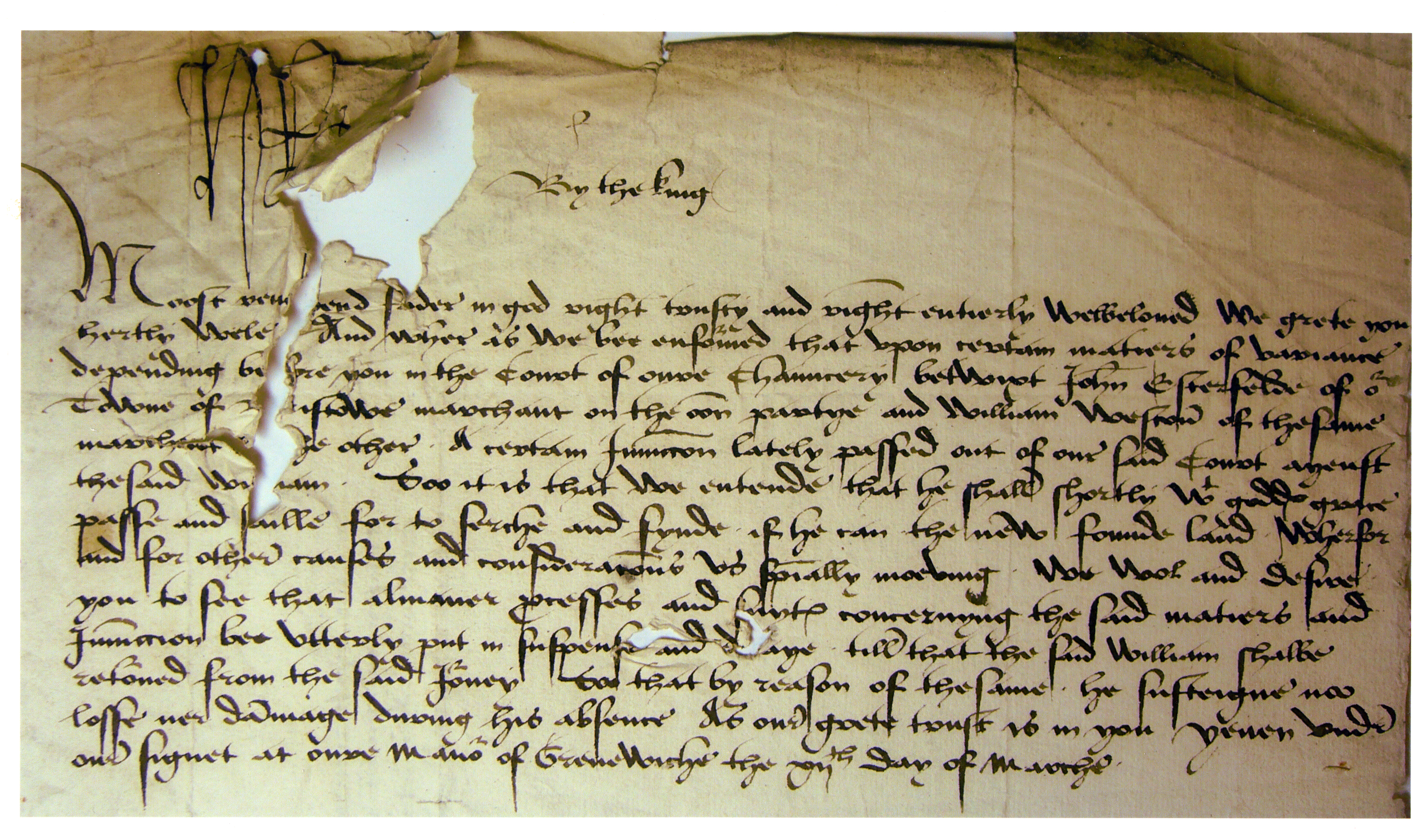
Letter from Henry VII headed 'By the king', and mentioning the 'new founde land' in the seventh line

The main evidence for Weston's expedition is found in a letter from Henry VII to his Lord Chancellor, John Morton, which was discovered in the late 20th century and first published in 2009. The King's letter provides for a suspension of legal action against Weston because it was the King's intent that Weston would "shortly with goddess grace passe and saille for to serche and fynde if he can the new founde land".

Historian Evan Jones and his fellow researcher, Margaret Condon, suggest that William Weston was probably operating under the Letters patent granted to the Venetian explorer John Cabot (Giovanni Caboto in Italian), which could be assigned to third parties. In March 1496 Cabot had been awarded the monopoly right in England to undertake voyages across the Atlantic, in search of new lands or trade routes to China. One of the stipulations of the patent was that Cabot should sail only from Bristol. He reached North America in 1497 and is believed to have landed at Newfoundland or Cape Breton Island before his return. He was the first European to do so since the Vikings had gone to Vinland 500 years before.

That Weston was a deputy or assign of Cabot, seems likely given the King's personal support for the Bristol explorer. That Cabot and Weston were working together is further supported by Henry VII's having made a 40-shilling reward to Weston in January 1498. Historians take this to mean that Weston was on Cabot's 1497 voyage. At the time of the reward, Cabot was in London sorting out business related to a pension he had been granted by the King and making preparations for a new voyage. Details of the reward were first reported in the Canadian press in August 2009. Following the expedition, the King paid Weston a £30 reward, as a way of recompensing him for expenses incurred in his voyage to the New World.

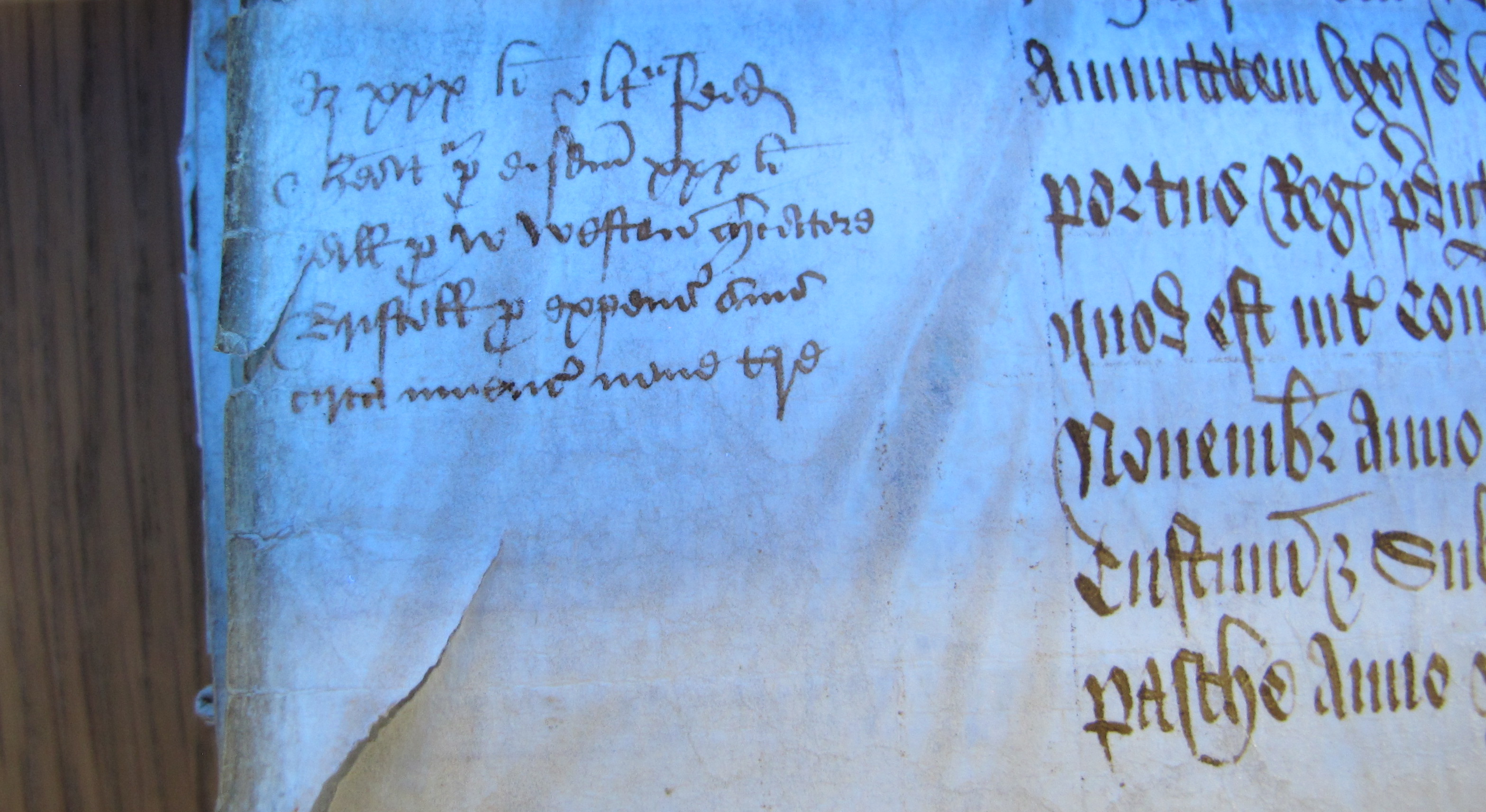
Reward payment to William Weston, naming him in the third line at left

The reward was paid in 1500, based on examining a 500-year-old scroll which is 13 feet (4.0 m) long made from the skins of more than 200 sheep, by using an ultraviolet light. The translation of the transaction of the reward, written by the auditor of the account, presumably following consultation with the King, reads:

Namely £30 above the fee [of the customers] and let them have for the said £30 a tally for W[illiam] Weston, merchant of Bristol, for his expenses about the finding of the new land.

—

This document has been published as a result of a research programme dubbed The Cabot Project at the University of Bristol, to find more information about the Bristol discovery voyages of this period. This project, with participation of several international scholars, has also been working with researchers in Newfoundland on archeological excavations in Carbonear, identified as a potential site for a 15th-century church that may have been started by an Augustine friar, Giovanni Antonio de Carbonariis, accompanying Cabot's 1498 expedition. He is believed to have stayed in Newfoundland to start the mission.

== Sources ==
- Margaret M. Condon and Evan T. jones, 'William Weston: early voyager to the New World', Historical Research (Nov. 2018, published online, 3 Oct 2018).
- Evan T. Jones and Margaret M. Condon, Cabot and Bristol's Age of Discovery: The Bristol Discovery Voyages 1480-1508 (University of Bristol, Nov. 2016).
- Margaret M. Condon and Evan T. Jones, William Weston v Thomas Smith: Chancery Petition, 1490 (University of Bristol, 2012)
- Margaret M. Condon and Evan T. Jones, Henry VII’s letter to John Morton concerning William Weston’s voyage to the new found land (University of Bristol, 2011)
- Evan T. Jones and M. M. Condon, 'Weston, William (d. in or before 1505)', Oxford Dictionary of National Biography, Oxford University Press, May 2010 accessed 30 Oct 2010
- Evan T. Jones, 'Alwyn Ruddock: John Cabot and the Discovery of America', Historical Research Vol 81, Issue 212 (2008), pp. 224–254
- Evan T. Jones, 'Henry VII and the Bristol expeditions to North America: the Condon documents', Historical Research, 27 Aug 2009
- Evan. T. Jones (ed.), "The Quinn Papers: transcripts of correspondence relating to the Bristol discovery voyages to North America in the fifteenth century", David B. Quinn Papers, Manuscript Division, Library of Congress, Washington, D.C. page 6. (University of Bristol, Bristol Repository of Scholarly Eprints (ROSE), 2009)
