= Giovanni Antonio de Carbonariis =

Italian Augustinian Friar

Fr. (Brother) Giovanni Antonio de Carbonariis was an Augustinian Friar from Milan who served in London as envoy between the Duke of Milan and King Henry VII. He is known to have sailed with John Cabot (aka Giovanni Caboto) during his 1498 expedition to North America. He may have founded a mission settlement and North America's oldest church (since the Norse settlements in Greenland) at Carbonear, Newfoundland and Labrador.

== History ==
Giovanni Antonio de Carbonariis accompanied Francesco Pagano's diplomatic mission to London at the start of 1490, as did Christopher Carbonariis, who appears to have some family connection. Jones says that "de Carbonariis" appears to be a family name. Giovanni Carbonariis' association to John Cabot has been known since the 19th century, based on his letter of 20 June 1498 to the Duke of Milan. He said that ‘Messer Giovanni Antonio de Carbonariis’ had accompanied Cabot's recently departed expedition. The Friar had left with five ships provided by King Henry VII of England. The Spanish envoy in London, Pedro de Ayala, wrote to the Crown noting that one of the five ships in Cabot's expedition had been badly damaged in a storm and was forced to land in Ireland, leaving Cabot to sail on. The ambassador notes that on the damaged ship was ‘another Friar Buil.’ This was an allusion to Bernardo Buil, the Minim missionary who had accompanied Christopher Columbus's 1493 expedition. Based on limited information, historians thought that Carbonariis was a minor player in the expeditions, and may not have sailed further than Ireland. Historian James Williamson had ascertained that Carbonariis was 'a man of some importance', having served as an envoy between the Duke of Milan and Henry VII, but the friar had been overlooked by most historians since then interested in the English voyages of exploration from Bristol.

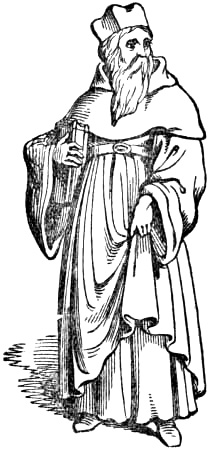
Augustinian

Alwyn Ruddock of the University of London was one of the world's foremost experts on John Cabot's expedition and suggested in correspondence that Carbonariis had a more important role, but due to ill health was unable to publish her findings. After her death in December 2005, all of her research notes and materials were destroyed, according to instructions in her will. Learning of her research, Dr Evan Jones of the University of Bristol has re-investigated her claims, finding new documents and verifying some of her positions. This includes that Carbonariis was an Augustinian friar who had been educated in Pavia. In the late 15th century, he was serving as the deputy papal tax collector in England. Since his principal, Adriano Castellesi, had been in Rome since 1494, Carbonariis was in effective control of one of the most lucrative clerical appointments in England. In this period, the Church still owned about one third of the land in England, and the Pope took ten per cent of the income generated from that property. Based on his position, Carbonariis controlled institutional wealth and had access to King Henry.

Fr. Giovanni Antonio Carbonariis emerges as a key player in Ruddock's account of John Cabot's voyages. While she never published a full account, she claimed that he was the explorer's most important backer in England, having arranged for Cabot to get a loan from Italian bankers in London for an expedition after the Venetian arrived in London in 1495. Even more importantly, she suggests that it was Carbonariis who secured Cabot an audience with King Henry VII of England. In March 1496 Cabot and his three grown sons were granted royal Letters patent for westward exploration. Ruddock also claims that Carbonariis outfitted a ship, called the Dominus Nobiscum, which accompanied the 1498 expedition. The ship carried other Italian friars who, with Carbonariis, are believed to have established a church and religious community in Newfoundland. In his account of this period, historian Richard Hakluyt had mistakenly associated the friars and ship by that name with a 1527 voyage by Cabot's son Sebastian Cabot; but, the latter's ships for that expedition were named Samson and Mary of Guildford.

While the religious community in Newfoundland is thought to have lasted at most only a few years, it would have been significant as North America's first Christian settlement since the Norse settlements in Greenland. This church appears to have been named after the church of San Giovanni a Carbonara in Naples, which was the mother church of a group of reformed Augustinian Friars called the 'Carbonara'. Dr Ruddock suggested that the community was located at what is now Carbonear, Newfoundland and Labrador, the modern name being a relic survival of the 15th-century settlement. (Williamson had already noted a connection between the name of the papal deputy and Carbonear.) From 2010 to 2014, archeological excavations were undertaken by Professor Peter Pope (d. 2017) of Memorial University of Newfoundland in Carbonear to study its colonial history. Remains from the 17th into the 19th century were found.

Ruddock's book proposal and surviving letters to colleagues do not indicate the sources on which she based her claims about the North American settlement, but she had written of discovering more than 20 documents related to Cabot's voyages. Historian Evan Jones has investigated some of her claims and confirmed evidence for a 1499 voyage undertaken by William Weston, a merchant of Bristol; he is now identified as the first Englishman to lead an expedition to North America. Evan Jones and co-researchers, including Margaret Condon (University of Bristol) and Dr Francesco Guidi Bruscoli (University of Florence), are carrying out further investigations of Dr Ruddock's claims as part of The Cabot Project.

== See also ==
- Giovanni Caboto

== External links and sources ==
- 'E. T. Jones, 'Alwyn Ruddock: "John Cabot and the Discovery of America "', Historical Research, 81, (May, 2008), 235-6'
- E. T. Jones, 'Henry VII and the Bristol expeditions to North America: the Condon documents', Historical Research (Early View, August 2009)'
- 'Dr Evan Jones', staff page at University of Bristol
- 'Mystery Surrounds Possible Oldest Church in North America', Livescience, 16 April 2007
- 'The lost voyage: First English-led expedition to North America', 27 August 2009, Press release, University of Bristol
- "Giovanni Antonio de Carbonariis", Dictionary of Canadian Biography Online

== Bibliography ==
- Evan T. Jones, "Alwyn Ruddock: 'John Cabot and the Discovery of America'", Historical Research Vol 81, Issue 212 (2008), pp. 224–254.
