= Cabot Square, Montreal =

Urban square in Montreal, Quebec, Canada

Cabot Square
- Square Cabot (French)
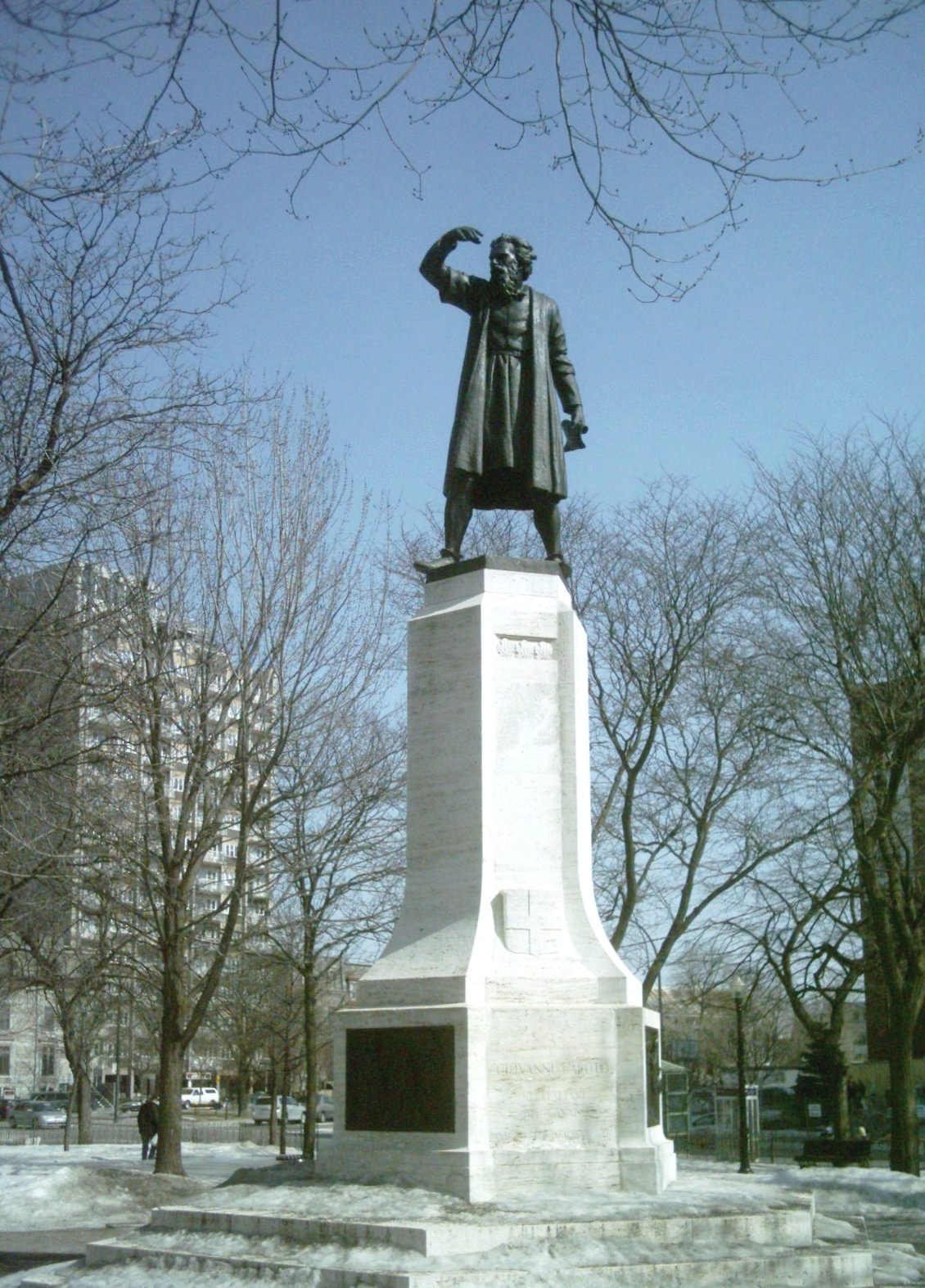
- The monument to John Cabot in Cabot Square.

- Location within Montreal
- Type: Town square
- Location: Shaughnessy Village, Ville-Marie Montreal, Quebec, Canada
- Coordinates: 45°29′22″N 73°35′01″W
- Area: 0.61 hectares (1.5 acres)
- Created: 1870
- Operator: City of Montreal
- Status: Open all year
- Public transit: Atwater; Terminus Cabot Square

Cabot Square (French: Square Cabot) is an urban square in Montreal, Quebec, Canada between the former Montreal Forum and the former Montreal Children's Hospital. The square is in the Shaughnessy Village neighbourhood, an area recently re-dubbed the Quartier des Grands Jardins and has been slated for redevelopment.

It is one of three statues of John Cabot in Canada; the others are both in Newfoundland at Confederation Building in St. John's and Cape Bonavista. Two other statues of Cabot are both found in Bristol, England, at Council House and Bristol Harbour.

== Overview ==
The square opened in 1870 and the monument to Italian-born English explorer John Cabot, by Italian sculptor Guido Casini (1892–1956), was unveiled on May 25, 1935.

It takes the form of an urban green space and may otherwise be described as a park, but its status as a public square means there is a generally unenforceable curfew. It is also the location of the STM's Atwater Terminus, with several bus routes connecting to the Métro station located nearby. A shelter and access point to the Underground City, Montreal (Réso) can be found at the Northwestern corner of the square.

Installation artwork and conceptual sculptures were integrated into the square as part of a broad urban beautification plan. In late summer/early fall 2013, the city began a major cleanup of the square including cleaning the statue of Cabot, pruning the trees and collecting debris.

== The Cabot Square Project ==
Cabot Square has been an informal gathering place for First Nations and Inuit in Montreal for a long time. Many of the park's occupants, found themselves stuck here, without family, friends or social supports.

In 2014, The Cabot Square Project was developed to counteract the displacement of Indigenous people in the downtown area of Montreal. The Native Women's Shelter met with multiple community organizations and currently this project is a product of a partnership between the Native Women's Shelter and the YMCA, in which both organizations have an outreach worker assigned to Cabot Square.

== See also ==
- Cabot Tower (Newfoundland)
- Cabot Trail

== Notes ==
- Document de l'exposition sur le Square Cabot et son quartier
