= Statue of John Cabot (St. John's, Newfoundland and Labrador) =

Monument in St. John's, Newfoundland and Labrador, Canada

- The statue in 2012
- Interactive map of Statue of John Cabot
- Location: Confederation Building, St. John's, Newfoundland and Labrador, Canada
- Coordinates: 47°34′59.5″N 52°43′24.5″W
- Designer: Hans Melis
- Type: Statue
- Dedicated date: 1971
- Dedicated to: John Cabot

A statue of Italian explorer John Cabot stands outside the Confederation Building in St. John's, Newfoundland and Labrador, Canada. It was designed by sculptor Hans Melis and unveiled in 1971. Its creation stemmed from a plan by Premier Joey Smallwood to install several monuments and statues on the building's grounds. A reproduction of the statue is located at Cape Bonavista.

== History ==
The statue originated as part of a plan by Joey Smallwood, the premier of Newfoundland, to have several monuments and statuary erected around the Confederation Building. In his 1973 autobiography, Smallwood said that he had planned to ask the governments of several nations to donate statues to the government of Newfoundland of individuals who had cultural ties to both the province and the country sending the monument. For example, he had planned to ask the federal government of the United States to send a statue of Squanto, a Native American who had lived in Newfoundland and later interacted with the early Pilgrim settlers of what is now the United States. He had also planned to request statues from several European nations, with Italy to be asked to provide a statue of explorer John Cabot.

Ultimately, the only statue donated to the provincial government was one of the explorer Gaspar Corte-Real by the government of Portugal. Despite this, Smallwood commissioned sculptor Hans Melis to create several more statues for the grounds of the Confederation Building, including one of Cabot. Melis was a Dutch-born artist who was active in Newfoundland, having joined the staff of the Newfoundland Academy of Art in 1957 and operating his own art school in St. John's in the 1960s. The provincial government had commissioned Melis for several projects, including eight busts of former prime ministers of Newfoundland located inside of the Confederation Building. Along with the Cabot statue, Smallwood also commissioned Melis to create a statue of Wilfred Grenfell for the grounds of the Confederation Building.

The statue (pictured 2012) stands outside of the main entrance of the Confederation Building.

The statue, located at the main entrance of the Confederation Building, was unveiled in 1971. It is one of several artworks located on the building's grounds, including the statues of Corte-Real and Grenfell, a monument honoring the 1982 Ocean Ranger disaster, and a totem pole. In addition to the statue, there are several other monuments and memorials to Cabot in the province, including Cabot Tower in St. John's and a monument at Cape Bonavista. The Cape Bonavista monument features a reproduction of the Confederation Building statue.

== See also ==
- 1971 in art
- Art of Newfoundland and Labrador
