= Shaughnessy Village =

- Neighbourhood of Montreal
- Village Shaughnessy (French)
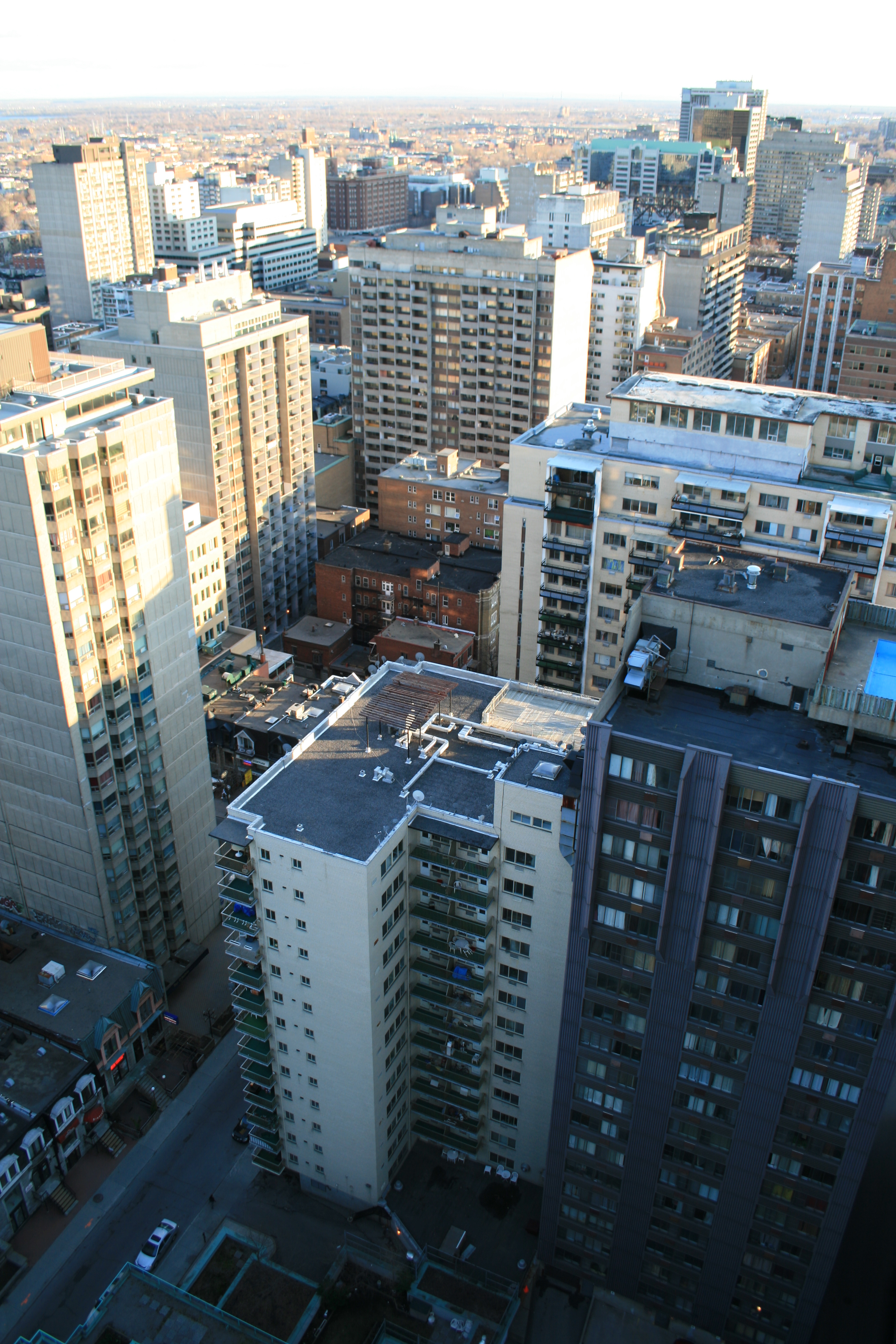
- Apartment buildings in the Shaughnessy Village

- Location of Shaughnessy Village in Montreal
- Coordinates: 45.492814°N 73.58041°W
- Country: Canada
- Province: Quebec
- City: Montreal
- Borough: Ville-Marie

Area
  - Total: 0.70 km^{2} (0.27 sq mi)

Population (2016)
  - Total: 15,677
  - Density: 22,396/km^{2} (58,010/sq mi)
- Postal Code: H3H
- Area codes: 514, 438

Shaughnessy Village (French: Village Shaughnessy) is a neighbourhood of Montreal, Quebec, Canada, located on the western side of the Ville-Marie borough. It is bounded by Guy Street to the east, Atwater Street to the west, Sherbrooke Street to the north, and René Lévesque Boulevard and the Ville-Marie Expressway to the south.

This neighbourhood is the most densely populated area of Quebec, due to the large number of high-rise apartment towers built in the 1960s and 1970s. The area is characterized by high-density residential housing and small businesses, typically owned and operated by immigrants living in the neighbourhood, concentrated at its core, with stately Victorian grey-stone row houses and beaux-arts styled apartment blocks at the edges of the neighbourhood. It is a primarily institutional neighbourhood, with a university, junior college, seminary, hospital and architecture museum among many private schools, colleges and technical schools.

In 1981, local citizens named the neighbourhood after Shaughnessy House, built in 1874 for Thomas Shaughnessy, president of the Canadian Pacific Railway. The house was declared a National Historic Site of Canada in 1974, and is now part of the Canadian Centre for Architecture.

Other notable landmarks in the area include the Montreal Forum, the former site of the Montreal Children's Hospital on Atwater Avenue, and Le Faubourg Sainte-Catherine shopping mall and Cabot Square.

== History ==
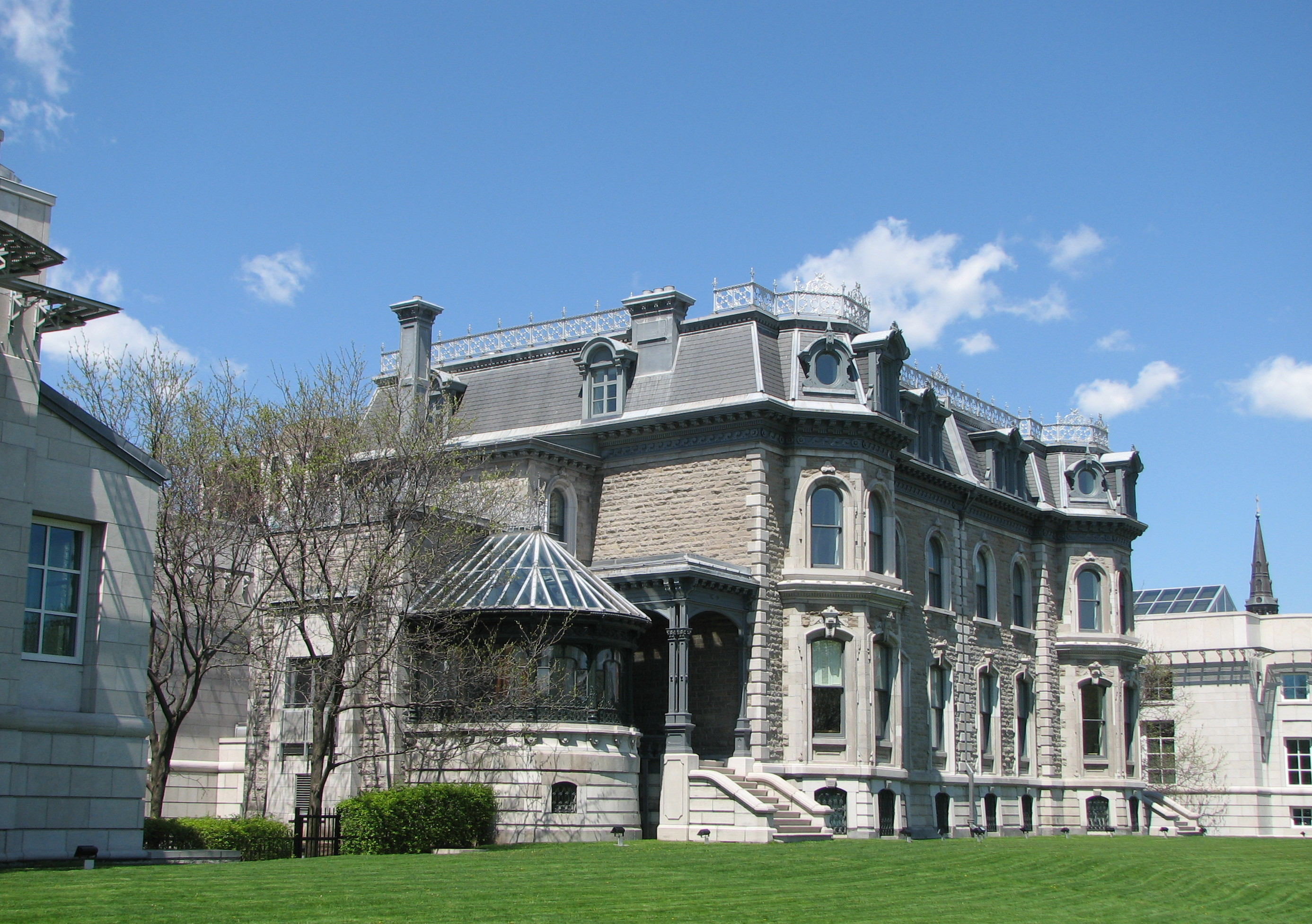
The Canadian Centre for Architecture is located in Shaughnessy Village.

Prior to Expo '67 and the Olympics, this neighbourhood was considered the city's second Gay Village (mostly by anglophones).

== Demographics ==
It is thus one of the more cosmopolitan neighbourhoods in the city, as well as being generally more English-speaking than the rest of Montreal. There is a sizeable population of Chinese-Canadians living in the area, so much so that part of the informally named Concordia Ghetto is also sometimes referred to as New Chinatown / Chinatown West. Much like Montreal's main Chinatown, it is pan-Asiatic, rather than uniquely Chinese.

The area is home to numerous small independently owned and operated restaurants, bars, bistros and cafés.

== Public transit ==
The neighbourhood is served by two Montreal Metro stations. In the north of the neighbourhood, on the Green Line, Guy–Concordia and Atwater stations are located. The area is also well-served by numerous bus lines terminating at Atwater Station that connect Westmount, Côte-des-Neiges, and much of the rest of the urban core. The Claire-Morissette bike path on De Maisonneuve Boulevard cuts through the centre of the neighbourhood, and the area is well served by BIXI Montréal stations.
