= Hans Melis =

Dutch and Canadian sculptor (1925–1978)

- Born: 1925; Tilburg, Netherlands
- Died: 1978 (aged 52–53)
- Notable work: Statue of John Cabot (St. John's, Newfoundland and Labrador)

Johannes Eduard Melis (1925–1978) was a Dutch and Canadian sculptor. He worked on several projects in both the Netherlands and in the Canadian province of Newfoundland.

== Biography ==
=== Early life and education ===
Melis was born in Tilburg in 1925. From 1940 to 1942, he studied under Bon Ingen-Housz at the Academy of Fine Arts in The Hague. He also studied in Germany, including under Bernhard Bleeker at the Academy of Fine Arts, Munich, and Otto Rost at the Dresden Academy of Fine Arts. From 1950 to 1958, and again in 1960, he studied in Paris, during which time he was taught by Ossip Zadkine.

=== Career ===
Following World War II, Melis opened a studio in Amsterdam, and in 1948, he moved to The Hague. Following this, he was commissioned for several sculptures by the government of the Netherlands, including several completed in the early 1950s. From 1955 to 1958, he taught at the Vrije Academie voor Beeldende Kunsten in the Hague.

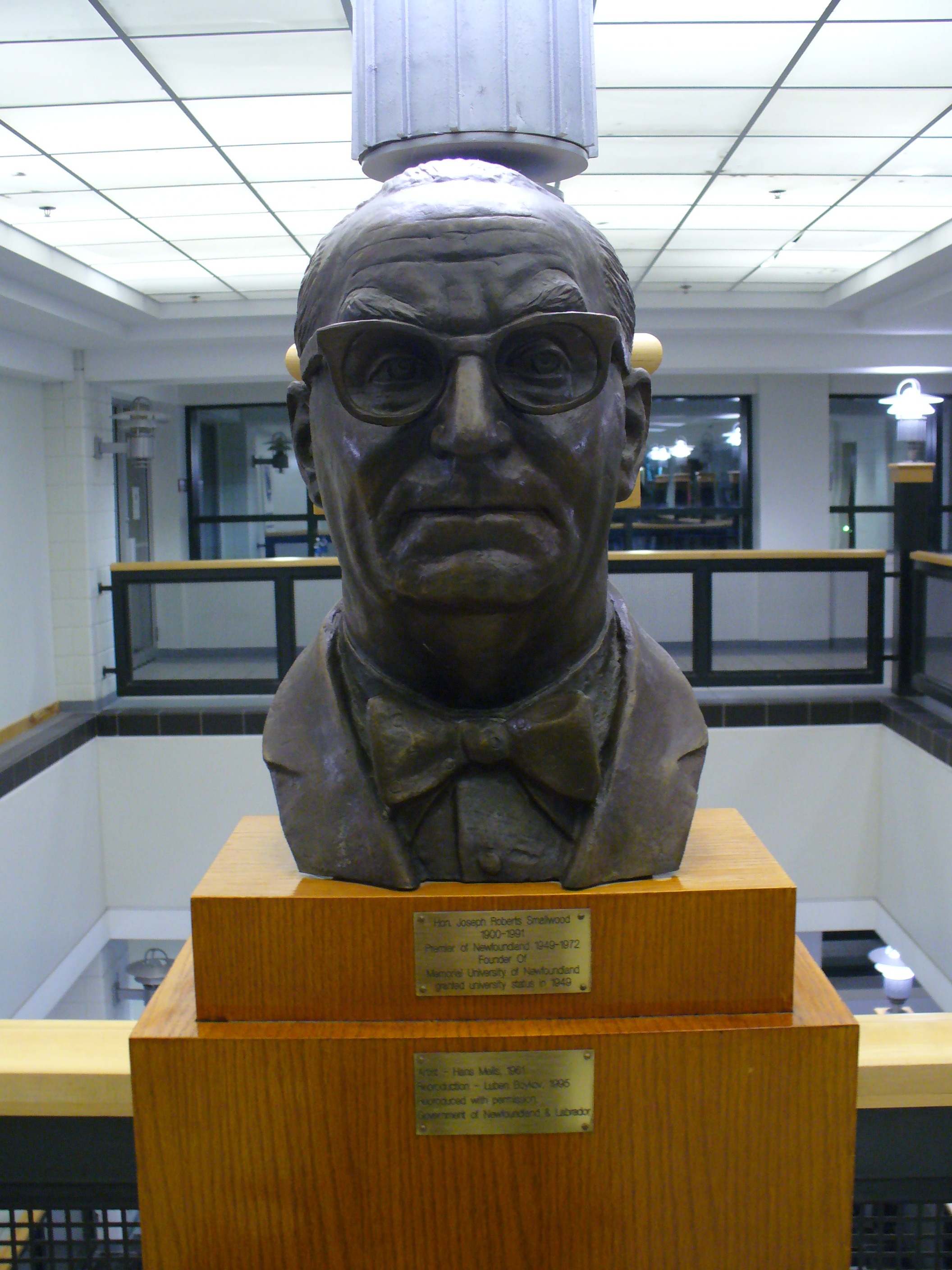
A bronze bust of Premier Joey Smallwood, created by Melis in 1961 and located at the Memorial University of Newfoundland (pictured 2008)

In 1957, he became a staff member of the Newfoundland Academy of Art in the Canadian province of Newfoundland, helping to establish a sculpture department which he served as the director of. Subsequently, he worked on commissions in the province, including a mural in the cafeteria of St. John's General Hospital (1958) and two bronze busts of the province's premier, Joey Smallwood (1959). Melis taught at the Newfoundland Academy until 1960. In the 1960s, he was appointed the official sculptor for the provincial government. During this time, he completed eight busts of former prime ministers of Newfoundland for the lobby of the Confederation Building, as well as a statue of John Cabot and a statue of Wilfred Grenfell for the building's grounds. Other public works included two concrete sculptures at the College of Trades and Technology and five bronze busts at the Memorial University of Newfoundland (both 1961).

In 1963, Melis opened his own school in St. John's, which he operated this institution until 1968. In 1969, the Montreal-based art publication Vie des Arts listed Melis as one of only a few sculptors who were active in Atlantic Canada, alongside New Brunswick-based artists John Hooper, Claude Roussel, and Fred Willar, and Nova Scotia-based artists Sarah Jackson and Charlotte Lindgren. That year, a memorial designed by him was dedicated in St. John's in honor of the 50th anniversary of the Transatlantic flight of Alcock and Brown. In a 1974 dictionary of Canadian artists, his living place was listed as St. John's. Melis died in 1978.
