= USS Cabot =

Three ships of the United States Navy have been named Cabot, after the explorer John Cabot.

- USS Cabot (1775), was a 14-gun brig purchased in 1775 and captured by the British in 1777.
- USS Cabot (CV-16), was renamed Lexington (CV-16) on 16 June 1942, prior to launch.
- USS Cabot (CVL-28), was a light aircraft carrier active in World War II. She was transferred to Spain in 1967 where she served as Dédalo. The ship was scrapped in 2001.
