= Gulgardi =

1971 painting by Kaapa Tjampitjinpa

- Artist: Kaapa Tjampitjinpa
- Year: 1971
- Type: Acrylic paint on hardboard
- Dimensions: 61.0 cm × 137.0 cm (24.0 in × 53.9 in)
- Location: Araluen Cultural Precinct; Alice Springs

Gulgardi is a 1971 painting by Kaapa Mbitjana Tjampitjinpa, an Indigenous Australian artist from Papunya in Australia's Northern Territory. It is notable for being the first work by an Indigenous Australian artist to win a contemporary art award, and the first public recognition of a Papunya painting.

== Background and creation ==
Kaapa (Note: Tjampitjinpa is a skin name, one of sixteen used to denote the subsections or subgroups in the kinship system of central Australian Indigenous people. These names define kinship relationships that influence preferred marriage partners and may be associated with particular totems. Although they may be used as terms of address, they are not surnames in the sense used by Europeans. Thus 'Kaapa Mbitjana' (usually abbreviated to 'Kaapa') is the element of the artist's name that is specifically his.) was an Indigenous Australian, born in remote Central Australia around 1920. Kaapa worked on a cattle station at Haasts Bluff before moving to Papunya in the 1960s, having been present during the town's construction in the late 1950s. Once settled at Papunya, according to art historian Vivien Johnson, he was a drinker with a reputation as a troublemaker, cattle thief and grog runner. He was also charismatic and smart.

For many years prior to the 1970s, Kaapa had been using traditional designs to create works of art for sale. These had included wooden carvings and watercolour paintings. In 1971 a local official, Jack Cooke, took six of Kaapa's paintings from Papunya into Alice Springs, entering one of them in a local competition, the Caltex Art Award. On 27 August that picture, Gulgardi, also referred to as Men’s Ceremony for the Kangaroo, Gulgardi, shared the first prize with a work by Jan Wesley Smith. The picture, approximately 140 by 60 centimetres in size, was painted on an old plywood cupboard door that still had rusty nails in it, as well as holes where the handle once had been.

== Reception ==
Gulgardi was described by the National Gallery of Victoria: "Kaapa's work, with its pictorial elements and seductive delicacy of detail, is cultivated to appeal to the western gaze. It also recreates the dramatic spectacle of men participating in ceremony and creates an illusion of the third dimension." Art historian Vivian Johnson considered the work typical of Kaapa's technique at the time. She wrote:

Kaapa's sure, fluid hand is discernible everywhere, from the red and yellow ochre border with fine white dots along the inner rim, to the lithe, lifelike figure in elaborate corroboree paint and headdress kneeling at the top centre. The design of the painting is balanced and, like most of Kaapa's subsequent work, symmetrical as to the elements arranged between this figure and the large ceremonial pole that runs along the base of the painting.

The work is held by the Araluen Arts Centre in Alice Springs.

== Bibliography ==
- Johnson, Vivien (2010). Once Upon a Time in Papunya. Sydney: University of New South Wales Press. ISBN 9781742230078.
- Perkins, Hetti; Fink, Hannah (2000). Papunya Tula: genesis and genius. Sydney: Art Gallery of New South Wales in association with Papunya Tula artists. ISBN 0-7347-6306-9.
