= Otto Rost =

German sculptor

- Born: 16 June 1887; Döbeln, Germany
- Died: 25 June 1970 (aged 83); Döbeln, Germany
- Occupation: Sculptor

Otto Rost (16 June 1887 – 25 June 1970) was a German sculptor. His work was part of the sculpture event in the art competition at the 1936 Summer Olympics.
