= Place des Martyrs (Lomé) =

Commemorative square and memorial in Lomé, Togo

Coordinates: 6°07′47″N 1°13′10″E

- Place des Martyrs in Lomé
- Interactive map of Place des Martyrs
- Location: Lomé, Togo
- Type: Memorial
- Dedicated to: Togolese who died in the struggle for independence and in defence of the country

The Place des Martyrs ("Martyrs' Square") is a commemorative square and memorial in Lomé, the capital of Togo.

It is used for national remembrance ceremonies, particularly the annual Martyrs' Day on 21 June.

== History ==
The national commemoration is associated with the events of 21 June 1957 at Pya-Hodo, in present-day Kozah Prefecture. During demonstrations against the French colonial administration, colonial forces opened fire on the crowd, killing around twenty people and wounding several others.

The events became an important part of the national remembrance of those who died during Togo's struggle for independence.

== Description ==
=== Location ===
The memorial is located in the Lomé II administrative area of Lomé. Government sources refer to it as the Place des Martyrs de Lomé II.

=== Stele ===
The Place des Martyrs contains a commemorative stele dedicated to Togolese who died for the country and is used for official state ceremonies.

=== Commemorations ===
Martyrs' Day is observed annually on 21 June. Official ceremonies at the square include wreath-laying, a minute of silence and military honours.

The site is also used for other national commemorations. On 23 September 2025, a ceremony was held there in memory of the victims of the events of 23 September 1986.

== See also ==
- History of Togo
- Independence Monument (Togo)
