= Place des Martyres (paintings) =

Series of paintings by Nabil Kanso

Encounter, watercolor, 44X56cm, 1973

Place des Martyres is the title of a series of over 250 watercolors and drawings executed in New York and Beirut between 1971 and 1974 by Nabil Kanso. The subjects of the works in the series are based on the women headquartered in the red-light district of Beirut city center called el Bourj, and after World War I named Place des Martyrs (French for Martyrs’ Place) in memory of dozens of Arab nationalists who were hanged in 1915-16 during Ottoman rule.

== Watercolors ==
The watercolors in the Place des Martyres series consists of approximately 170 works in 3 sizes of 44x56cm, 35x51cm, and 31x41cm. They are characterized by transparent deep colors of red, orange, yellow, blue, and black embodying figurative imagery representing both real and imaginary scenes of the gaudy life in the city center district adjoining Place des Martyrs.

Painted in the atmosphere of pre-civil war Beirut, the compositions depict sexualized encounters and interactions of figures in various sensual situations and entertainment settings. They make references to works of such artists as Degas, Toulouse-Lautrec, Rouault, Kirchner, Nolde, Laurencin and Pascin, whose “Sensual spirit seems to inspire the aquarelles and inhabit Kanso’s figures, which in a semi-erotic round, covet, touch, caress, move, and seem to emerge from a pagan fresco where time is consecrated to dance, perfume, and moments propitious to dialogue, exchange, comparison, and fleeting occasions.” Others point out that the depicted figures “assume the poses of interpretive dance without being self-conscious. Some of the images contain poetic and bowdlerized words reflecting ironic and humorous tones, with allusion to Beirut's sexual marketplace and its social life and culture. They show scenes of figures in the street, at the café, bar, salon, or in intimate settings, and engaged in conversation, flirtation, relaxation or sensual pleasure. The figures reflect a blend of “expressive faces, beseeching, flirtatious, charming, sleepy, talkative, reluctant, and pensive.”

== Drawings ==
The 80 drawings in the series exist alongside the watercolors with shared expressions, subjects and thematic qualities. They fall in sizes of 45x40cm, 45x30cm, 35x27cm. Around 50 are in pen and ink with broad, cross-hatched black lines contrasting the light and dark areas, and another 30 are sketch line drawings and wash embodying humorous writings. Some of the drawings portray “lovers and nudes using heavy brush and ink technique,” and rendered in “sympathetic Germanic style.”
