= Alwyn Ruddock =

British historian

- Born: 13 April 1916; Cowes, Isle of Wight, England
- Died: 21 December 2005 (aged 89); Midhurst, West Sussex, England
- Known for: Research on the English voyages of the 15th-century explorer John Cabot
- Scientific career
- Fields: History
- Institutions: Southampton University; Birkbeck College, University of London

Alwyn Ann Ruddock (13 April 1916 – 21 December 2005) was a noted British historian of the Age of Discovery, best known for her research on the English voyages of the 15th-century explorer John Cabot. Cabot and other navigators of the time were trying to find lands to the West, such as the mythical "Isle of Brasil" or the North American lands reached by Icelanders in previous centuries.

== Early work ==
Ruddock's first published research was a two-volume work (with David Beers Quinn), The Port Books or Local Customs Accounts of Southampton (Vol. I in 1937, and Vol. II in 1938). During World War II, she taught in the history department of what was to become Southampton University. She also published in many of the top academic journals, including English Historical Review, Economic History Review, and History.

In 1946, Ruddock moved to Birkbeck College, University of London, where she published Italian Merchants and Shipping in Southampton, 1270-1500 in 1951. She was appointed to the position of reader in history in 1952, and subsequently elected as a fellow both of the Society of Antiquaries of London and of the Royal Historical Society.

== Later work ==
In the 1950s and early 1960s, Ruddock's concerns shifted from the activities of Italian merchants in Southampton to a broader investigation of Italian mercantile networks and businesses in medieval Europe. She intended to produce a "big" book to be titled Italian Merchants and Shipping. Around 1965, she claimed to have made a discovery in the archives of an Italian banking family that had a branch in London: including a loan that the family advanced to him c. 1496. For at least 25 years, she was promising to produce her Cabot book "soon". In 1992, she undertook a formal book contract with the University of Exeter Press.

She felt unable or unwilling to publish it; upon her death, she left instructions for her research papers to be destroyed. Her only published research in this field are a number of short articles that she wrote in the late 1960s to early 1970s.

== Current investigations ==
After her death, the Bristol University historian Evan T. Jones began to investigate Ruddock's unpublished research claims about the voyages of John Cabot, producing an article about them in the journal Historical Research in April 2007 (print edition, 2008). He wrote a second article about two documents found by the historian Margaret Condon, who had not published them in the 1980s, in part due to the understanding that Ruddock had a book in progress on the topic. Jones subsequently set up the Cabot Project along with a number of other historians in Britain, Italy, Canada, and Australia to carry out further investigations into the early voyages, and to search for the evidence for Ruddock's claims.

== Selected publications ==
- Ruddock, A. A. (1946). Alien merchants in Southampton in the later Middle Ages. The English Historical Review, 61(239), 1-17.
- Ruddock, A. A. (1946). Alien hosting in Southampton in the fifteenth century. The Economic History Review, 16(1), 30-37.
- Ruddock, A. A. (1950). The Trinity House at Deptford in the sixteenth century. The English Historical Review, 65(257), 458-476.
- Ruddock, A. A. (1951). Italian Merchant and Shipping in Southampton 1270-1600 (Southampton).
- Ruddock, A. A. (1966) John Day of Bristol and the English Voyages Across the Atlantic before 1497, The Geographical Journal, vol. 132, Pt. 2, June, p. 225-233.
- Reddaway, T. F., and A. A. Ruddock (1969) The accounts of John Balsall, Purser of the Trinity of Bristol, 1480-1. The Camden Miscellany, vol. 2
- Ruddock, Alwyn A. (1970) "Columbus and Iceland: New Light on an Old Problem." The Geographical Journal 136, no. 2: 177-189.
