= Confederation Building (Newfoundland and Labrador) =

Government building in St. John's, Newfoundland and Labrador, Canada

Coordinates: 47°35′00.27″N 52°43′25.71″W

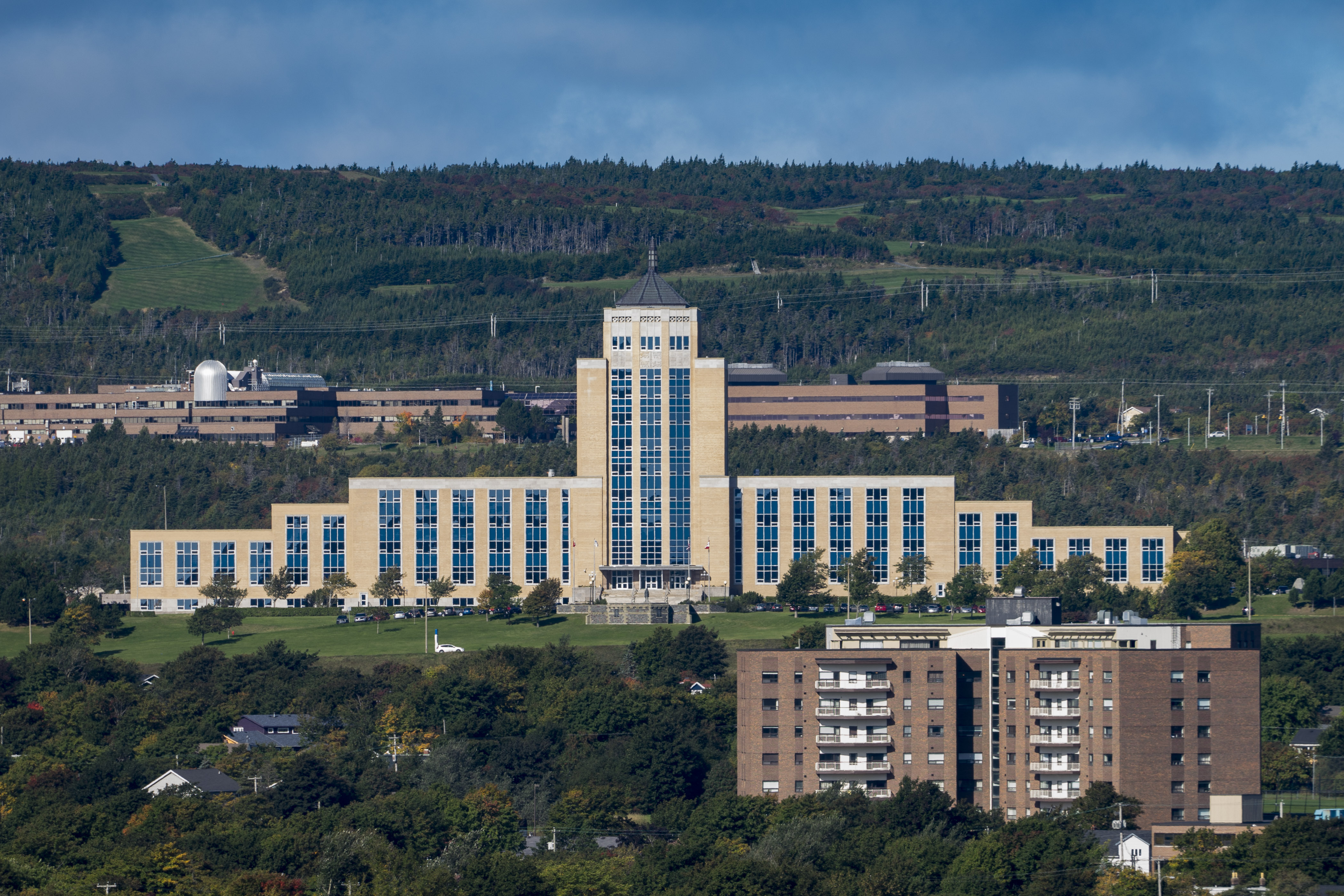
- Confederation Building East Block
- Alternative names: French: Édifice de la Confédération

General information
- Type: Legislative Assembly
- Architectural style: Post-War Modern
- Location: St. John's, Newfoundland and Labrador, 100 Prince Philip Drive, St. John's, Canada
- Elevation: 100 metres (330 ft)
- Current tenants: Government of Newfoundland and Labrador
- Construction started: 1959
- Completed: 1960; 1991
- Inaugurated: 1960
- Renovated: 1982 & presently
- Cost: $9,000,000 ($95.3 million in 2025 dollars)
- Client: Government of Newfoundland and Labrador
- Owner: Government of Newfoundland and Labrador
- Landlord: Government of Newfoundland and Labrador

Height
- Height: 64 metres (210 ft)

Dimensions
- Other dimensions: 198 metres (650 ft) wide; 64 metres (210 ft) tall (East Block)

Technical details
- Floor count: 11
- Floor area: 34,838 square metres (374,990 sq ft)
- Lifts/elevators: 9

The Confederation Building serves as the home of the Newfoundland and Labrador House of Assembly. It is on Confederation Hill overlooking Newfoundland and Labrador's capital city, St. John's. The brick- and concrete-clad building has 11 storeys and is 64 metres (210 ft) tall. It was completed in 1960 at a cost of $9 million to replace the Colonial Building. A lantern is at the top of the copper roof of the central tower and acts as a beacon when turned on at night.

In 1982, construction began on the West Block extension, a modern 7-storey structure, which is a six-storey building, with a gross floor area of 34,838 square metres (374,990 sq ft). The original building is now considered the East Block of the Confederation Building. A third building on the legislature campus is the Service Building Annex a two-storey building housing a day care centre and garage for some provincial government vehicles.

== Complex ==
The complex consists of two buildings that house most departments of the Government of Newfoundland and Labrador. It also contains the provincial legislature, and offices for elected members.

=== East Block ===
The original and tallest of the two buildings.

It is home to these provincial government departments, agencies, and offices:

- Office of the Premier
- Executive Council of Newfoundland and Labrador
- Department of Finance
- Department of Justice and Public Safety
- House of Assembly
- Office of the Official Opposition
- Office of the Third Party
- Government Members Office
- Protocol Office
- Cabinet Secretariat
- Communications and Consultation Branch
- Hansard Office
- House of Assembly Broadcast Centre

=== West Block ===
Opened in 1985, this building is to the west of the East Block and contains most other provincial government departments, and various offices and agencies:

- Department of Jobs, Growth and Rural Development
- Department of Education
- Department of Health and Community Services
- Department of Tourism, Culture, Arts and Recreation
- Department of Environment and Climate Change
- Department of Social Supports and Well-Being
- Department of Transportation and Infrastructure
- Department of Municipal Affairs and Community Engagement
- Digital Government and Service NL
- Office of Public Engagement
- Center for Learning and Development
- Policy Innovation and Accountability Office
- Office of Women and Gender Equality
- Disability Policy Office

=== Off site ===
Remaining departments of the provincial government are located in other offices in St. John's:

- 81 Kenmount Road - Department of Social Supports and Well-Being, NL Health Services
- 20 Cordage Place - Department of Social Supports and Well-Being, NL Health Services
- Petten Building, Strawberry Marsh Road - Department of Fisheries, Forestry and Agriculture
- Natural Resources Building, 50 Elizabeth Avenue - Department of Energy and Mines
- Howley Building, Higgins Line - Forestry, Agriculture and Lands, Crown Lands
- 261 Kenmount Road, Public Service Commission
- 40 Higgins Line - Office of the Chief Information Officer
- Sir Brian Dunfield Building, 2 Canada Drive - Newfoundland and Labrador Housing Corporation
- Argyle Building, Portugal Cove Road - Research and Development Corporation
- 25 Hallett Crescent - Fire and Emergency Services
- Beothuck Building, 20 Crosbie Place - Office of the Information and Privacy Commissioner
- Dorest Building, 6 Mount Carson Avenue, Mount Pearl - Department of Social Supports and Well-Being

== Statues and landmarks at the Legislature ==
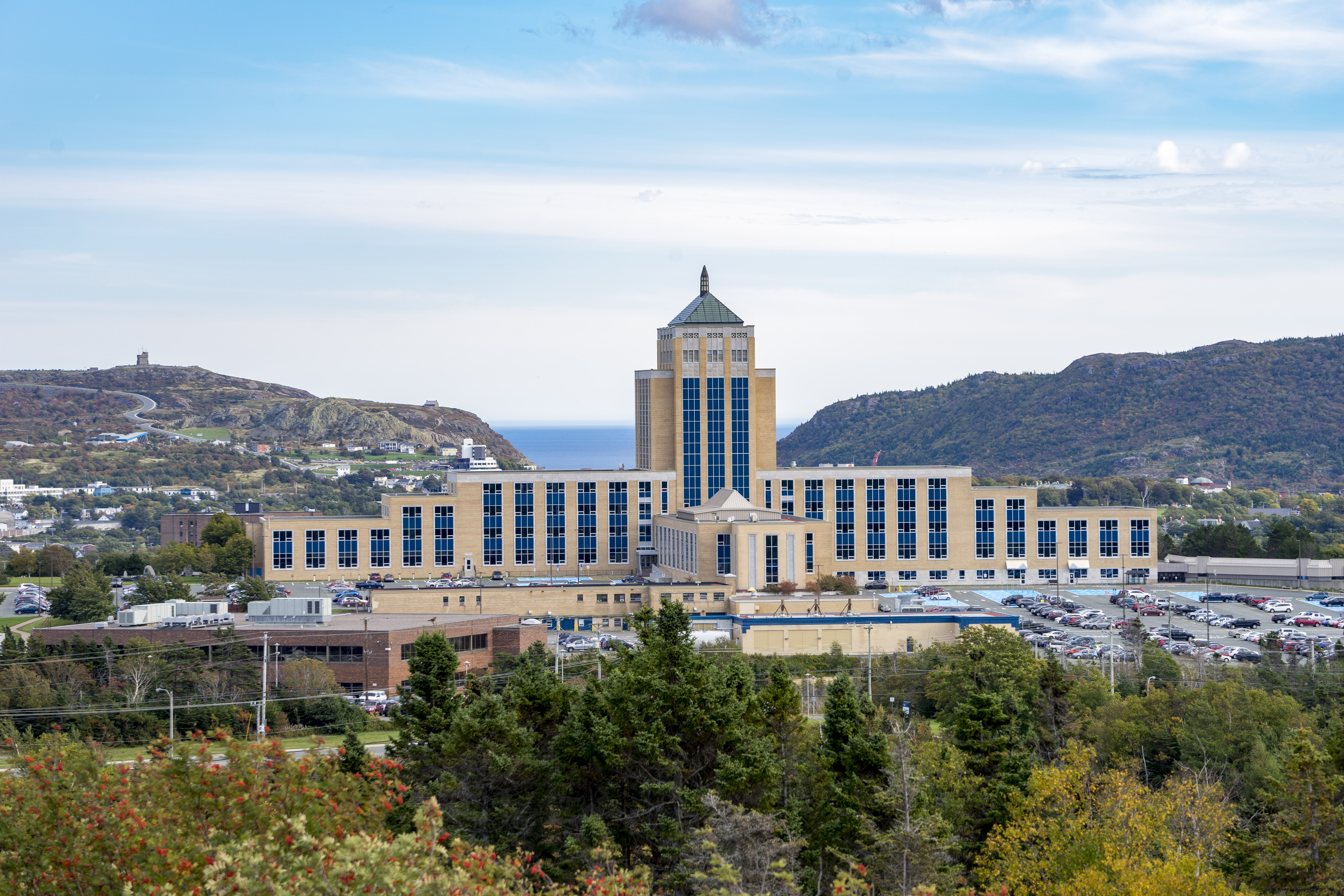
A rear facing view of The Confederation Building, in St. John's Newfoundland.

A number of statues and landmarks are located near the building:

- Statue of Gaspar Corte-Real - located southeast of the building
- Statue of John Cabot by Hans Melis- located at the foot of the steps at the East Block
- Statue of Sir Wilfred Grenfell by Hans Melis
- An enamel-coated metal coat of arms of Newfoundland and Labrador donated by businessman Paul J. Johnson in 2000 is surrounded by a Gothic Revival stone lookout located in front of the East Block
- The flag of Canada, flag of Newfoundland and Labrador, and the British Union Jack fly in front of the building

== See also ==
- Executive Council of Newfoundland and Labrador
- Memorial University of Newfoundland
