= Newfoundland and Labrador Route 230 =

Highway in Newfoundland and Labrador, Canada

Route 230
- Bonavista Peninsula Highway; Discovery Trail

Route information
- Maintained by Newfoundland and Labrador Department of Transportation and Infrastructure
- Length: 110 km (68 mi)

Major junctions
- South end: Route 1 (TCH) near Thorburn Lake
- Route 230A at Clarenville Airport; Route 233 in Lethbridge; Route 234 in Lethbridge; Route 235 in Southern Bay; Route 239 near Lockston; Route 236 near Port Rexton; Route 237 in Catalina; Route 238 in Elliston; Route 238 in Bonavista
- North end: Route 235 in Bonavista

Location
- Country: Canada
- Province: Newfoundland and Labrador

Highway system
- Highways in Newfoundland and Labrador
← Route 222	→ Route 230A

Route 230 is the main Bonavista Peninsula Highway, commencing from Route 1 (the Trans Canada Highway) at Thorburn Lake, about 10-15 kilometres north of Clarenville and proceeding all the way to Bonavista at the end of the Peninsula. The highway also carries the designation of Discovery Trail.

== Route description ==
Route 230 begins a few kilometres northwest of Clarenville at an interchange with Route 1 (Trans-Canada Highway, Exit 26), just southeast of Thorburn Lake. It heads east to bypass Clarenville along its north side, where it meets Route 230A (Old Bonavista Highway) at the Clarenville Airport. The highway now heads northeast through rural areas to pass Morley's Siding and Lethbridge, where it has intersections with Route 233 (Clode Sound Road) and Route 234 (Winter Brook Road). Route 230 heads through rural areas for several more kilometres to pass through Southern Bay, where it meets a local road leading to Charleston and Sweet Bay as well as meeting the southern end of Route 235 (Bonavista Bay Highway). The highway heads through more rural terrain before entering the Trinity Bight area and beginning to follow the southern coastline of the peninsula at Lockston, where it also has an intersection with Route 239 (New Bonaventure Road). Route 230 has an intersection with Route 236 (Stock Cove Road) before passing through Port Rexton, where it meets a local road leading to Trinity East. The highway now passes through Champney's Arm, where it meets two local roads, one leading to Champney's West, and the other leading to Champney's East and English Harbour, before heading northeast through inland, rural, and hilly for the next several kilometres. Route 230 now heads north along the coast to pass through the town of Trinity Bay North, where it passes the communities of Melrose, Port Union, and Catalina, as well as where it meets Route 237 (Blackhead Bay Road). The highway now leaves Trinity Bay North and it meets a local road leading to Little Catalina before heading north through rural areas, where it has an intersection with Route 238 (Elliston Road). Route 230 now enters the Bonavista town limits along Confederation Drive, and heads north through neighbourhoods and business district to have another intersection with Route 238 (Coster Street) as Route 230 bypasses downtown along its west side. The highway passes through more neighbourhoods before making a sharp left turn and coming to an end shortly thereafter at another intersection with Route 235 (Church Street).

As with most highways in Newfoundland and Labrador, the entire length of Route 230 is a two-lane highway.

== Major intersections ==
Location	km	mi	Destinations	Notes
Thorburn Lake	0.0	0.0	Route 1 (TCH) – Clarenville, Gander, Grand Falls-Windsor	Exit 26 on Route 1; southern terminus
	11.4	7.1	Route 230A south (Old Bonavista Highway) – Shoal Harbour, Clarenville	Northern terminus of Route 230A
	12.2	7.6	Clarenville Airport main entrance	Access road into airport
Lethbridge	21.5	13.4	Route 233 west (Clode Sound Road) – Bloomfield, Musgravetown	Eastern terminus of Route 233
Lethbridge	25.6	15.9	Route 234 east (Winter Brook Road) – Lethbridge, Brooklyn	Western terminus of Route 234
Southern Bay	38.8	24.1	Sweet Bay Road (Route 230-14) - Charleston, Sweet Bay	
Southern Bay	41.8	26.0	Route 235 north (Bonavista Bay Highway) – Summerville, Plate Cove West	Southern terminus of Route 235
Lockston	62.3	38.7	Route 239 south (New Bonaventure Road) – Trinity, Dunfield	Northern terminus of Route 239
Port Rexton	64.4	40.0	Route 236 north (Stock Cove Road) – Knight's Cove, King's Cove	Southern terminus of Route 236; provides access to Lockston Path Provincial Park
Port Rexton	65.6	40.8	Rocky Hill Road (Route 230-15) - Trinity East	
Port Rexton	66.6	41.4	Champney's West Road (Route 230-17) - Champney's West	
Champney's Arm	67.7	42.1	Champney's Arm Road (Route 230-19) - Champney's Arm	
Champney's Arm	68.2	42.4	English Harbour Road (Route 230-21) - Champney's East, English Harbour	
Catalina	92.4	57.4	Route 237 west (Church Street) – Amherst Cove	Eastern terminus of Route 237; Blackhead Bay Road
Little Catalina	95.1	59.1	Little Catalina Road (Route 230-26) - Little Catalina	
	102	63	Route 238 north (Elliston Road) – Elliston, Maberly	Southern terminus of Route 238
Bonavista	109	68	Route 238 south (Coster Street) – Elliston, Spillars Cove	Northern terminus of Route 238
Bonavista	110	68	Route 235 (Church Street/Cape Shore Road) – Newman's Cove, Summerville, Cape Bonavista, Cape Bonavista Light	Northern terminus
1.000 mi = 1.609 km; 1.000 km = 0.621 mi
