= List of historic places in the Bonavista Bay region =

Location of Bonavista Peninsula in Newfoundland; Bonavista Bay is to its northwest, Trinity Bay to its southeast.

This article is a list of historic places in the Bonavista Bay region of the Canadian province of Newfoundland and Labrador. These properties are entered on the Canadian Register of Historic Places, whether they are federal, provincial, or municipal. The list contains entries found in communities on the Bonavista Peninsula, from Clarenville north and east.

== List of historic places ==
Name	Address	Coordinates	Government recognition (CRHP №)	Wikidata ID	Image
Heber John Abbott House	Bonavista NL	48°39′57″N 53°06′10″W	Newfoundland and Labrador (1883), Bonavista municipality (5944)		More images
Samuel Abbott House and Fishing Premises Registered Heritage Structure	Bonavista NL	48°39′12″N 53°06′14″W	Newfoundland and Labrador (1938), Bonavista municipality (5933)		More images
Alexander Chapel of All Souls Mortuary Chapel	Bonavista NL	48°39′17″N 53°06′09″W	Newfoundland and Labrador (2191), Bonavista municipality (5868)		More images
William Alexander House (Bridge House) Registered Heritage Structure	Bonavista NL	48°39′08″N 53°06′43″W	Newfoundland and Labrador (1846), Bonavista municipality (5873)		More images
All Saints Anglican Church Registered Heritage Structure	English Harbour NL	48°22′20″N 53°15′50″W	Newfoundland and Labrador (3760)		Upload Photo
Bailey's Cove Church of England School	Bonavista NL	48°39′39″N 53°06′46″W	Newfoundland and Labrador (1847), Bonavista municipality (5940)		More images
Band of Hope Loyal Orange Lodge LOL 1402 Municipal Heritage Building	Elliston NL	48°38′01″N 53°02′38″W	Elliston municipality (8002)		More images
Archibald Bennett House	Brooklyn NL	48°22′57″N 53°52′04″W	Newfoundland and Labrador (2178)		Upload Photo
Campbell House	Trinity NL	48°22′04″N 53°21′38″W	Trinity municipality (2075)		
Cape Bonavista Lighthouse	Bonavista NL	48°42′06″N 53°05′07″W	Newfoundland and Labrador (3060)		More images
Christ Church Churchyard Cemetery Municipal Heritage Site	Bonavista NL	48°34′04″N 53°20′04″W	Bonavista municipality (5869)		More images
Archibald Christian House Registered Heritage Structure	20 Church Road; Trinity NL	48°34′04″N 53°20′04″W	Newfoundland and Labrador (19044)		Upload Photo
Church of the Most Holy Trinity	Trinity NL	48°22′04″N 53°21′30″W	Newfoundland and Labrador (3756)		More images
Clarenville Railway Station Municipal Heritage Building	Clarenville NL	48°10′21″N 53°57′48″W	Clarenville municipality (7280)		More images
Coleman / Jenkins Commercial Establishment	Trinity NL	48°22′02″N 53°21′25″W	Newfoundland and Labrador (2311)		More images
The Currie Premises	Britannia NL	48°08′46″N 53°43′15″W	Newfoundland and Labrador (2061)		Upload Photo
William Ellis Saint House	Bonavista NL	48°38′45″N 53°06′54″W	Newfoundland and Labrador (2339), Bonavista municipality (5943)		More images
Elliston United Church Municipal Heritage Building	Elliston NL	48°38′00″N 53°02′29″W	Elliston municipality (7476)		More images
Evelley House	Trinity East NL	48°22′48″N 53°20′51″W	Newfoundland and Labrador (2626)		More images
Factory/Advocate Building	Port Union NL	48°29′55″N 53°04′52″W	Newfoundland and Labrador (2148), Port Union municipality (5977)		More images
Fishermen's Union Trading Company Retail Store Registered Heritage Structure	Port Union NL	48°29′57″N 53°04′54″W	Newfoundland and Labrador (7782)		More images
Fishermen's Union Trading Company Salt Fish Plant Registered Heritage Structure	Port Union NL	48°29′57″N 53°04′55″W	Newfoundland and Labrador (7781)		More images
Dan Goodland Downstairs Root Cellar Municipal Heritage Structure	Elliston NL	48°37′58″N 53°02′01″W	Elliston municipality (7472)		More images
Jim Goodland Upstairs Root Cellar Municipal Heritage Structure	Elliston NL	48°37′24″N 53°01′03″W	Elliston municipality (7473)		More images
Gover House	Trinity NL	48°22′04″N 53°21′38″W	Newfoundland and Labrador (2298)		More images
Government of Canada Building	24-28 Church Street; Trinity NL	48°39′13″N 53°06′42″W	Federal (9478)		Upload Photo
Grant's Stage	Trinity NL	48°22′02″N 53°21′25″W	Newfoundland and Labrador (2313)		More images
Green Family Forge	Trinity NL	48°22′14″N 53°21′36″W	Newfoundland and Labrador (2116)		More images
Green Island Lighthouse	Green Island, off the coast of Catalina; Catalina NL	48°30′15″N 53°02′35″W	Federal (21133, (4760), Newfoundland and Labrador (4761)		Upload Photo
James Groves House	Bonavista NL	48°39′24″N 53°06′55″W	Newfoundland and Labrador (1885), Bonavista municipality (5945)		More images
John Hancock House	Portland NL	48°25′00″N 53°49′00″W	Newfoundland and Labrador (2303)		Upload Photo
James Leo Harty House and Outbuildings	Duntara NL	48°36′08″N 53°22′12″W	Newfoundland and Labrador (2023)		Upload Photo
Hiscock House (Mountain Ash Villa)	Trinity NL	48°22′14″N 53°21′31″W	Newfoundland and Labrador (3757)		More images
Jubilee House	Bonavista NL	48°39′10″N 53°06′41″W	Newfoundland and Labrador (2138), Bonavista municipality (5947)		More images
Lawlor House	Trinity East NL	48°22′46″N 53°20′46″W	Newfoundland and Labrador (2297)		Upload Photo
Lawrence Cottage	Bonavista NL	48°39′10″N 53°06′41″W	Newfoundland and Labrador (3595), Bonavista municipality (5939)		More images
Lester-Garland Premises	Trinity NL	48°22′20″N 53°21′36″W	Newfoundland and Labrador (3753)		More images
Lighttower	King's Cove NL	48°34′37″N 53°19′17″W	Federal (3976)		Upload Photo
Lighttower	Random Island NL	48°05′41″N 53°32′43″W	Federal (3993)		Upload Photo
Lockyer/Swyers House	Bonavista NL	48°39′08″N 53°06′39″W	Newfoundland and Labrador (1869), Bonavista municipality (5946)		More images
Loyal Orange Lodge LOL #4	Bonavista NL	48°39′08″N 53°06′55″W	Newfoundland and Labrador (1882), Bonavista municipality (5941)		More images
Methodist Schoolhouse / SUF Hall	Trinity NL	48°22′02″N 53°21′31″W	Newfoundland and Labrador (3658)		Upload Photo
Edwin and Priscilla Miller House	New Bonaventure NL	48°17′18″N 53°27′00″W	Newfoundland and Labrador (2093)		Upload Photo
Mockbeggar Plantation	Bonavista NL	48°39′22″N 53°06′51″W	Newfoundland and Labrador (4126)		More images
Mockbeggar Plantation Fish Store	Bonavista NL	48°39′22″N 53°06′51″W	Newfoundland and Labrador (4053)		More images
Monks House	King's Cove NL	48°34′02″N 53°20′11″W	Newfoundland and Labrador (2231)		Upload Photo
Nathanial Morris House	Trinity NL	48°22′02″N 53°21′39″W	Newfoundland and Labrador (2299)		More images
Mortuary Chapel	Trinity NL	48°22′16″N 53°22′03″W	Newfoundland and Labrador (2319)		More images
Adam Mouland Property Registered Heritage Structure	Bonavista NL	48°39′22″N 53°06′21″W	Newfoundland and Labrador (8238)		Upload Photo
William Pardy Property Registered Heritage Structure	Bonavista NL	48°38′41″N 53°06′52″W	Newfoundland and Labrador (8241)		More images
The Parish Hall	Trinity NL	48°22′21″N 53°21′36″W	Newfoundland and Labrador (2320)		More images
George Pearce Root Cellar Municipal Heritage Structure	Elliston NL	48°39′28″N 52°46′54″W	Elliston municipality (7474)		Upload Photo
Tom Porter Root Cellar Municipal Heritage Structure	Elliston NL	48°37′56″N 53°02′12″W	Elliston municipality (7496)		Upload Photo
Port Union Historic District National Historic Site of Canada	Harbour Front, Reid Road, Coaker Road and the Power Station; Port Union NL	48°30′00″N 53°05′00″W	Federal (7657), Newfoundland and Labrador (10189), Port Union municipality (5328)		More images
Port Union Hydro-Electric Generating Station	Port Union NL	48°29′53″N 53°05′23″W	Newfoundland and Labrador (4365)		More images
William Pye House Registered Heritage Structure	Brooklyn NL	48°23′06″N 53°52′18″W	Newfoundland and Labrador (10172)		Upload Photo
John Quinton Limited - Fish Store and Salt Store	Red Cliffe NL	48°34′31″N 53°29′39″W	Newfoundland and Labrador (2335)		Upload Photo
John Quinton Limited Post Office Registered Heritage Structure	Red Cliffe NL	48°34′31″N 53°29′39″W	Newfoundland and Labrador (2336)		Upload Photo
John Quinton Limited Residence Registered Heritage Structure	Red Cliffe NL	48°34′31″N 53°29′39″W	Newfoundland and Labrador (2337)		Upload Photo
John Quinton Limited Shop Registered Heritage Structure	Red Cliffe NL	48°34′31″N 53°29′39″W	Newfoundland and Labrador (2338)		Upload Photo
Ryan Fish Storage	2 Ryan's Hill; Bonavista NL	48°38′51″N 53°06′45″W	Federal (9929)		More images
Ryan Premises National Historic Site of Canada	2 Ryan's Hill; Bonavista NL	48°38′52″N 53°06′47″W	Federal (4428)		More images
Ryan Residence	2 Ryan's Hill; Bonavista NL	48°38′52″N 53°06′43″W	Federal (9931)		More images
Ryan Retail Store	2 Ryan's Hill; Bonavista NL	48°38′53″N 53°06′45″W	Federal (9930)		More images
James Ryan Shop	Elliston NL	48°38′02″N 53°02′21″W	Newfoundland and Labrador (2301), Elliston municipality (7479)		More images
Ryan Store and Fish Purchasing Centre	2 Ryan's Hill; Bonavista NL	48°38′53″N 53°06′45″W	Federal (9932)		More images
James Ryan Tenement House	Old Catalina Road; Bonavista NL	48°38′51″N 53°06′44″W	Newfoundland and Labrador (2029), Bonavista municipality (6132)		More images
St. Andrew's Anglican Church	Brooklyn NL	48°23′48″N 53°52′12″W	Newfoundland and Labrador (1850)		More images
St. Joseph's Roman Catholic Cemetery Municipal Heritage Site	Bonavista NL	48°38′55″N 53°06′33″W	Bonavista municipality (8242)		More images
St. Joseph's Roman Catholic Church	Bonavista NL	48°38′57″N 53°06′35″W	Newfoundland and Labrador (3945), Bonavista municipality (6126)		More images
St. Joseph's Roman Catholic Presbytery	Bonavista NL	48°38′57″N 53°06′35″W	Newfoundland and Labrador (2139), Bonavista municipality (5936)		More images
St. Mary's Anglican Church	Elliston NL	48°37′59″N 53°02′36″W	Newfoundland and Labrador (1854), Elliston municipality (7477)		More images
St. Paul's Anglican Church	Trinity NL	48°22′09″N 53°21′30″W	Newfoundland and Labrador (2330)		More images
St. Peter's Anglican Church	Catalina NL	48°31′03″N 53°04′53″W	Newfoundland and Labrador (2106)		More images
St. Paul's Anglican School	Trinity NL	48°22′11″N 53°21′35″W	Newfoundland and Labrador (4016)		More images
Shoal Harbour Methodist Cemetery Municipal Heritage Site	Clarenville NL	48°11′22″N 53°58′03″W	Clarenville municipality (14412)		Upload Photo
Slade House	Trinity NL	48°22′12″N 53°21′48″W	Newfoundland and Labrador (2077)		More images
Society of United Fishermen SUF Lodge #9	Bonavista NL	48°39′19″N 53°06′41″W	Newfoundland and Labrador (2104), Bonavista municipality (5938)		More images
Alexander and Jennie Templeman House	Bonavista NL	48°39′23″N 53°06′45″W	Newfoundland and Labrador (1849), Bonavista municipality (5942)		More images
Dugald Templeman House Registered Heritage Structure	Bonavista NL	48°39′26″N 53°06′48″W	Newfoundland and Labrador (15661)		
Joseph and Selena Templeman Property	Bonavista NL	48°39′29″N 53°06′50″W	Newfoundland and Labrador (1867), Bonavista municipality (6125)		More images
Philip Templeman Building/Swyers General Store Registered Heritage Structure	Bonavista NL	48°38′56″N 53°06′41″W	Newfoundland and Labrador (1868), Bonavista municipality (5948)		More images
Robert Tilley House	Elliston NL	48°38′03″N 53°02′21″W	Newfoundland and Labrador (3758), Elliston municipality (7478)		More images
Henry Tremblett House	Bonavista NL	48°39′34″N 53°06′40″W	Newfoundland and Labrador (2079), Bonavista municipality (5937)		More images
Trinity Courthouse, Gaol and General Building	Trinity NL	48°22′21″N 53°21′36″W	Newfoundland and Labrador (2115)		More images
Trinity Harbour Provincial Historic Site	Shipwreck site in Trinity Harbour; Trinity NL	48°21′59″N 53°20′55″W	Newfoundland and Labrador (3596)		More images
Trinity Heritage Area Municipal Heritage District (2007)	Trinity NL	48°21′56″N 53°21′28″W	Trinity municipality (12062)		
Trinity Historic Area	Trinity NL	48°21′55″N 53°21′28″W	Trinity municipality (5263)		
Trinity Train Loop	Trinity NL	48°23′02″N 53°19′32″W	Newfoundland and Labrador (2175)		More images
William (Billy) Wheeler House Registered Heritage Structure	Keels NL	48°36′19″N 53°24′31″W	Newfoundland and Labrador (8240)		Upload Photo
Frederick Mifflin House	21 Church Street	48°39′12.6″N 53°6′43.2″W	Invalid (19406)	Q51185470	Upload Photo
John Mifflin House	17-19 Church Street	48°39′11.4″N 53°6′43.2″W	Invalid (19407)	Q51185469	Upload Photo
Samson Mifflin House	15 Church Street	48°39′11.2″N 53°6′44.6″W	Invalid (19405)	Q51324592	Upload Photo
Memorial United Church	Church Road	48°39′16.7″N 53°6′43.6″W	Invalid (19410)	Q51324632	More images
Frederick Harris House	59 Hospital Road	48°38′48.6″N 53°6′35.9″W	Invalid (19041)	Q51409264	Upload Photo
Methodist Central School	Coster Street	48°39′8.1″N 53°6′37.8″W		Q51409976	Upload Photo

== See also ==
- List of historic places in Newfoundland and Labrador
- List of National Historic Sites of Canada in Newfoundland and Labrador
