= Newfoundland and Labrador Route 239 =

Highway in Newfoundland and Labrador

Route 239
- New Bonaventure Road

Route information
- Maintained by Newfoundland and Labrador Department of Transportation and Infrastructure
- Length: 17 km (11 mi)

Major junctions
- North end: Route 230 near Lockston
- South end: New Bonaventure

Location
- Country: Canada
- Province: Newfoundland and Labrador

Highway system
- Highways in Newfoundland and Labrador
← Route 238	→ Route 301

Route 239 is a highway in the Trinity Bight portion of Newfoundland in the Canadian province of Newfoundland and Labrador. It is a short route, running from a junction at Route 230, starting at the community of Lockston and ending at the community of New Bonaventure.

Route 239 is one of only two highway numbers in Newfoundland and Labrador that end in the number 9 (the other being Route 419 on the Baie Verte Peninsula).

== Route description ==
Route 239 begins in Lockston at an intersection with Route 230 (Bonavista Peninsula Highway/Discovery Trail) and it immediately passes south through the community. The highway leaves Lockston and winds its way south along the coastline to have an intersection with a local road leading to Trinity before passing through Goose Cove and Dunfield. Route 239 winds its way more inland through hilly terrain for several kilometres, where it passes through Trouty, before coming to a fork in the road, with a local road leading to Old Bonaventure (Route 239-15), and Route 239 continues south to New Bonaventure, where the highway comes to a dead end at the town's harbour.

== Major intersections ==
Location	km	mi	Destinations	Notes
Lockston	0.0	0.0	Route 230 (Bonavista Peninsula Highway/Discovery Trail) to Route 1 (TCH) – Clarenville, Catalina, Bonavista	Northern terminus
Goose Cove	3.2	2.0	Trinity Road - Trinity	
	16.4	10.2	Old Bonaventure Road (Route 239-15) - Old Bonaventure	
New Bonaventure	17	11	Dead End at New Bonaventure's harbour	Southern terminus
1.000 mi = 1.609 km; 1.000 km = 0.621 mi
