= James M. Ryan =

Canadian politician

James Ryan (April 15, 1842 – September 19, 1917) was a Canadian businessman in Newfoundland.

== Early life and education ==
Born in Bonavista, Newfoundland, James Ryan was the oldest of ten children, nine of whom survived to adulthood. His father, Michael Ryan, had emigrated from Ireland in 1833, and married his mother, Elinor Fleming, nine years later.

== Career ==
On October 20, 1857, when Ryan was just 15 years old, he and his father started a fishery supply business and public house at Bailey's Cove, a section of Bonavista. This became a successful enterprise and in 1869 Ryan had acquired enough capital to purchase the business premises formerly owned by William Keen. Incorporated in 1870 as James Ryan and Company, the enterprise had expanded beyond Bonavista to other communities along the coast. Trading operations were soon established at Elliston, Catalina, Bay de Verde, Open Hall and Plate Cove.

With his brother Daniel they established a separate business at King's Cove in 1875 and another at Trinity in 1906. The Ryan empire was expanding rapidly and in the mid-1890s they acquired the fishing premises of J. and W. Stewart at Greenspond, which became an integral part of the Ryan mercantile empire. They also operated their own summer fishing stations in Labrador, at such places as Hawk's Harbour and Batteaux.

Ryan's businesses were one of the last of Newfoundland firms to use shop assistants who were trained in England, thereby assuring that his employees would be well-versed in the products they were selling. Another important aspect of his business successes was that he dealt directly with the English suppliers and not through the St. John's middlemen.

== Personal life and legacy ==
Ryan married Katherine McCarthy of Carbonear at Roxbury, Massachusetts on March 2, 1897. Ryan was one of the wealthiest people in Newfoundland and founder of a business that eventually became a Newfoundland historic property called Ryan Premises.

In 1905 Ryan located his main residence to St. John's and built a home, which took 2 years (1909–1911), on Rennie's Mill Road, one of the wealthiest parts of the city. It was an imposing structure that was built to his specifications and known simply as "The House", where it still stands today. Appointed to the Legislative Council in 1913, he spent four rather quiet years as a member of that chamber before his death at St. John's on September 19, 1917.

James and his brother Daniel were two of the wealthiest men in Newfoundland at the turn of the century. After James death his final bequests included funding for Mount Cashel Orphanage, Belvedere Orphanage, the Church of England Orphanage, the Methodist Orphanage and a trust fund to form a permanent relief fund for the poor of Bonavista.

Ryan's Bonavista operations and his various subsidiary companies carried on business until his son Herbert died in 1978. The premises remained dormant for a time before being acquired by Parks Canada in 1991.

== See also ==
- List of people of Newfoundland and Labrador
- List of communities in Newfoundland and Labrador
