= Trinity Bight, Newfoundland and Labrador =

Populated place in Newfoundland and Labrador

Coordinates: 48°20′35″N 53°19′16″W

Trinity Bight is a large area of the Northwestern portion of Trinity Bay, Newfoundland and Labrador, Canada. The bight contains the communities of New Bonaventure, Old Bonaventure, Trouty, Dunfield, Goose Cove, Trinity, Lockston, Trinity East, Port Rexton, Champney's Arm, Champney's West, Champney's East, and English Harbour. The area is not to be confused with the bay named Trinity Bight in the Strait of Belle Isle, Newfoundland.

== See also ==
- List of communities in Newfoundland and Labrador
