= Newfoundland and Labrador Route 238 =

Highway in Newfoundland and Labrador, Canada

Coordinates: 48.62712°N 53.04718°W

Route 238

Route information
- Maintained by Newfoundland and Labrador Department of Transportation and Infrastructure
- Length: 12.2 km (7.6 mi)

Major junctions
- South end: Route 230 near Elliston
- North end: Route 230 in Bonavista

Location
- Country: Canada
- Province: Newfoundland and Labrador

Highway system
- Highways in Newfoundland and Labrador
← Route 237	→ Route 239

Route 238, also known as Elliston Road, is a 12.2-kilometre-long (7.6 mi) north–south highway on the northeastern corner of the Bonavista Peninsula on the island of Newfoundland. It is one of very few highways in Newfoundland and Labrador that both begin and end at the same highway, this one being Route 230 (Bonavista Peninsula Highway).

== Route description ==
Route 238 begins at an intersection with Route 230 southwest of Elliston in a very rural and remote area. Route 238 heads northeast to wind its way through Elliston, where it has an intersection with a local spur road, labeled as Route 238–11, which provides access to other areas of town and Maberly. The highway now winds its way northwest through rural terrain for several kilometres to enter Bonavista, where it has an intersection with Spillars Cove Road, which provides access to Spillars Cove. Route 238 now heads west along Coster Street past a cemetery and a neighbourhood before coming to an end at another intersection with Route 230 (Confederation Drive).

== Major intersections ==
Location	km	mi	Destinations	Notes
	0.0	0.0	Route 230 (Bonavista Peninsula Highway/Discovery Trail) to Route 1 (TCH) – Clarenville, Catalina, Bonavista	Southern terminus
Elliston	5.6	3.5	Maberly Road (Route 238-11) - Maberly	
Bonavista	11.6	7.2	Spillars Cove Road - Spillars Cove	
Bonavista	12.2	7.6	Route 230 (Confederation Drive/Discovery Trail) to Route 1 (TCH) – Catalina, Clarenville, Cape Bonavista	Southern terminus
1.000 mi = 1.609 km; 1.000 km = 0.621 mi

== The Elliston Road ==
The portion that outsiders would call the Elliston Road itself has three distinct parts called by Elliston dwellers the Bonavista Road, the Catalina Road and the Maberly Road.

The portion between Elliston and Bonavista (ending near Spillar's Cove) is called by those of Elliston 'The Bonavista Road.' It forms a T-junction with the two other parts of Route 238 mentioned here. Coming from Bonavista, if you turn right at the stop-sign (just past the Anglican graveyard on the right), you leave Elliston again quite quickly on the Catalina Road which, although it does not go directly to Catalina, does bring you to Route 230 on the outskirts of Bonavista towards Catalina. If, having come from Bonavista, you turned left instead of right, you would find yourself on Route 238-II which passes through Elliston Centre, Sandy Cove and the Neck and finishes in a circular road in Maberly i.e. 238-II is a dead-end.
