= William Ellis (missionary in Newfoundland) =

Irish Methodist missionary in Newfoundland

- Born: 1780; County Down, Ireland
- Died: 21 September 1837; Harbour Grace, Newfoundland
- Occupation: Methodist clergyman

William Ellis (1780 – 21 September 1837) was a Methodist missionary in Newfoundland. He was the first permanent Methodist minister on the island, and the first to be buried there. The community of Bird Island Cove was renamed Elliston in his honour.

== Life ==
Ellis was born in County Down in Ireland, and was converted to Methodism at age 16. He witnessed the Irish Rebellion of 1798; at the Battle of Ballynahinch he and his family, in hiding from the battle, barely escaped discovery by the enemy before the arrival of troops. Believing in divine providence and that he was saved for a purpose, he became a class leader and local preacher; he later became an ordained minister.

The first Methodist missionary in Newfoundland was Laurence Coughlan in 1766; he returned to England in 1773. In following years, there were a few lay preachers; any ordained ministers did not remain long. Ellis would be the first permanent minister on the island.

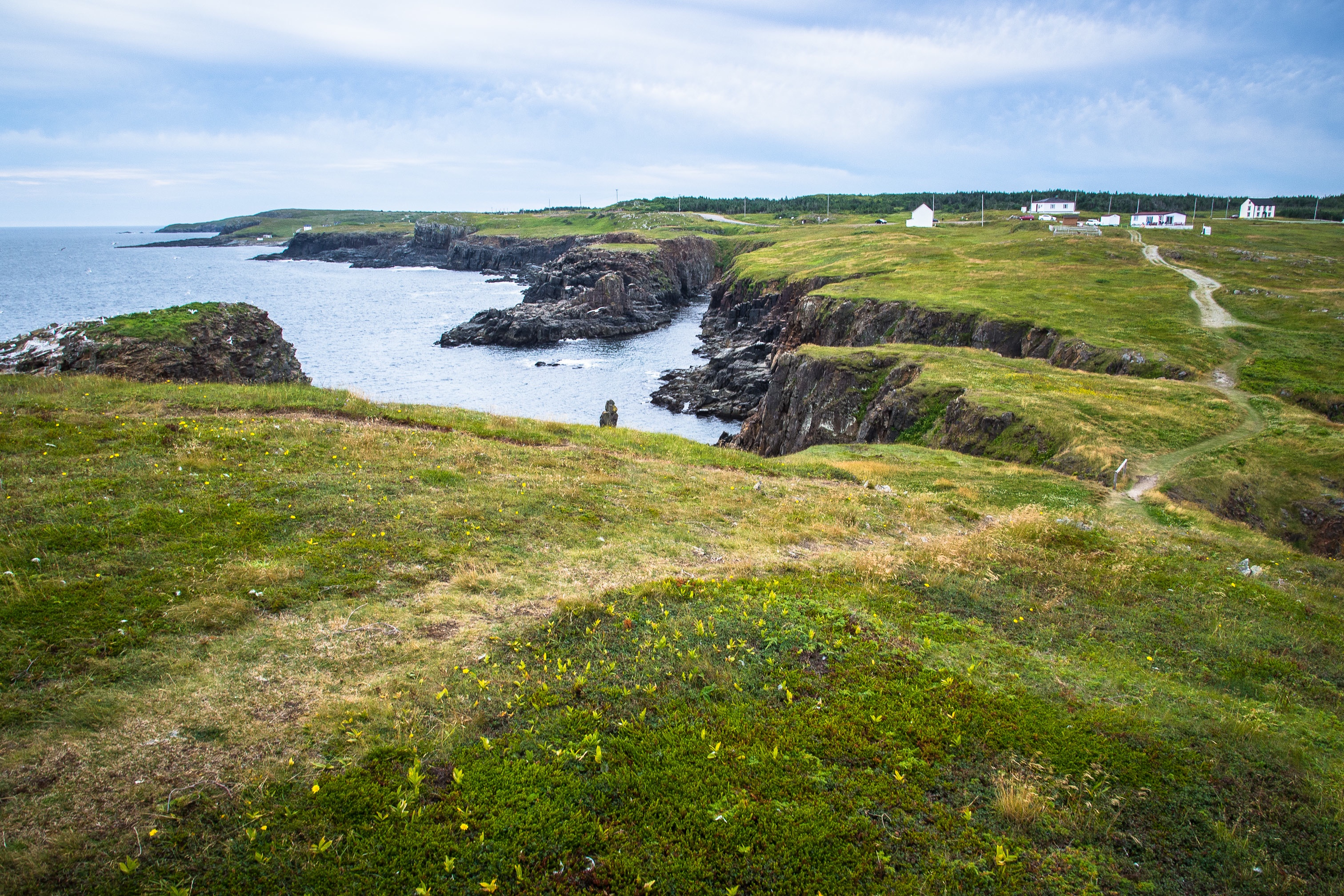
The coast at Elliston, formerly Bird Island Cove; Ellis preached at Bird Island Cove in 1814

On 23 November 1808 he arrived in Newfoundland. During five years he ministered on the north side of Conception Bay and the south side of Trinity Bay. In 1813 he went to Bonavista, which had no Protestant minister; the construction of a church there, begun 15 years earlier, was completed under his leadership.

He initiated two new missions, at Catalina and Bird Island Cove; in April 1814 he delivered the first sermon to Protestant residents of Bird Island Cove.

In 1816 the Methodist District of Newfoundland was created, under the British Methodist Conference, and Ellis was its first chairman. During his career he served in Trinity, Blackhead, Brigus-Cupids, Port de Grave and Harbour Grace. For several periods he served at Bonavista, where he was most successful; he left there for the last time in 1835, when he was in poor health, and returned to Trinity which was a less onerous posting.

He was married and had six children. He died in Harbour Grace in 1837; he was the first Methodist missionary to die and be buried in Newfoundland. His colleague, Rev. William Wilson, wrote, "He was a kind and amiable man, of good natural abilities, and very eloquent as a speaker; he was faithful, laborious, and successful in his work."

The community of Bird Island Cove was renamed Elliston in the early 1900s to honour William Ellis.
