= Maberly, Newfoundland and Labrador =

Maberly locally /ˈmæbərli/ is a tiny coastal hamlet (called an outport in Newfoundland) at the end of route 238-II on the Bonavista Peninsula on the island of Newfoundland with a permanent year-round population of about 20. In the 1921 census, there were 83 inhabitants. It has long been associated with nearby Elliston, being about 3 km from Elliston Centre by road, and was officially annexed by that town in the 1960s. Driving from Elliston Centre to Maberly, you pass through Sandy Cove and the Neck.

== Geography ==
Maberly is located by sea between the towns of Little Catalina and Elliston. Among the named coves in Maberly as you enter the community are Thomas' Cove (48°37′14.43″N 53°00′51.48″W), Chris' Cove (48°37′13.26″N 53°00′48.05″W) and Charlie's Cove (48°37′10.99″N 53°00′44.92″W). There is a small cove between Chris' Cove and Charlie's Cove which never seems to have been named (48°37′13.05″N 53°00′45.19″W) — at least not a name which stuck.

=== The coves and roads of Maberly ===
Thomas' Cove, just off the coast of which lies South (Suder) Bird Island (48°37′29.59″N 53°00′35.61″W), is the broadest of the coves and its shore is covered with relatively large beach stones; between Thomas' Cove and Chris' Cove there are cliffs and a small gulch; Chris' Cove, into which Muddy Brook empties, has a broad, flat bedrock formation which slopes into the ocean and received a government-sponsored slipway which fell into disrepair in the 1990s and has been removed; the aforementioned 'nameless cove' is on the other side of a tiny point of land; then there is a headland between this nameless cove and Charlie's Cove called The Gaze or often just over below. A gravel road climbs a much larger headland to the other side of Charlie's Cove, passing a steep-sided gulch and then peters out into the wilderness after several hundred metres and several houses. It is this road which now forms the beginning of the Little Catalina-Maberly walking trail. The coast rises to relatively steep cliffs with no harbour possibilities for several kilometres. Another rough road leaves the community on the inland side and quickly branches, the shorter branch being the gravel pit road in whose gravel pit several demolition derbies have been held and a much longer road which brings you out into Duke's Land (named for a man by the name of Marmaduke, not a nobleman).

=== Muddy Brook: the brook and the pond ===
The brook which flows through the community is still called Muddy Brook, reminiscent of the community's former name, and the brook flows from Muddy Brook Pond just below which is a wide steady which looks almost like another small pond. The road to Duke's Land brings you here. (48°36′26.35″N 53°01′35.32″W)

=== Regional Geography ===
Flowers Cove (48°36′32.17″N 53°00′22.59″W), named for the treacherous maritime rock shallows known as the 'Flowers' is within easy walking distance from the community along the Little Catalina-Maberly walking trail through some very productive and picturesque berry-picking grounds. Northern (Noder) Bight is an abandoned community between Maberly and Little Catalina most of whose former inhabitants moved to Maberly or to Catalina from the 1850s to the 1890s. Residents of Maberly themselves mostly resettled to more central parts of Elliston or to Bonavista during the 1950s and 1960s.

== Settlement and early history ==
Maberly was originally called Muddy Brook and was first permanently settled by John Chaulk and his sons in or around 1806.

== Former Provincial Park ==
Just inside the entrance to Maberly, there is a look-out for the Bird Islands which was originally constructed as Maberly Provincial Park in the same category as Dungeon Provincial Park in Bonavista i.e. a day park for picnicking and, in Maberly's case, bird-watching. Elliston town council has assumed responsibility for the park and now there is a demonstration garden there and tourist poster boards describing topics such as root cellar construction and gardening in the area.

== Fishing grounds ==
Historically, the shoals in the area of Maberly were highly productive.

== See also ==
- List of communities in Newfoundland and Labrador
- List of people of Newfoundland and Labrador
