= Maberly =

Maberly may refer to:

- Maberly, Ontario, Canada
- Maberly, Newfoundland and Labrador, Canada
- Maberly (surname)
- Thrupp & Maberly, British coachbuilding company
