= Bailey's Cove =

Hamlet in Newfoundland and Labrador

Bailey's Cove (alternatively spelled Bayley's Cove) is a Canadian hamlet in the Bonavista district of the province of Newfoundland and Labrador.

The Bailey's Cove Church of England School, constructed c. 1880 to 1900, and its Municipal Heritage Building are both historic places on the Canadian Register of Historic Places.

== See also ==
- List of communities in Newfoundland and Labrador
