= Sweetbay =

Sweetbay or Sweet bay may refer to:

- Laurus nobilis, a species of laurel tree
- Magnolia virginiana, a species of magnolia tree
- Sweetbay Supermarket, a chain of grocery stores.
- Sweet Bay, Newfoundland and Labrador, a settlement on the island of Newfoundland
