= Bonavista Peninsula =

Peninsula in Newfoundland and Labrador

Coordinates: 48.47°N 53.36°W

Location of Bonavista Peninsula in Newfoundland

The Bonavista Peninsula is a large peninsula on the east coast of the island of Newfoundland in the Canadian province of Newfoundland and Labrador. It consists of 50 incorporated towns/unincorporated communities which have a population of 12,176 as of the 2016 Canadian Census. Bonavista is the largest population centre on the peninsula.

The peninsula runs 85 km northeast from a 19 km wide isthmus and measures between 15–40 km in width. It separates Bonavista Bay in the north from Trinity Bay to the south.

== Geography ==
Starting at the Trinity Bay side it commences at the northeastern part of the bay at Shoal Harbour, immediately north of Clarenville. Continuing east the peninsula's south shore includes the communities of Trinity and Catalina, with Port Rexton in Robinhood Bay between them, ending at its easternmost tip at Cape Bonavista. The north shore of the peninsula includes the communities of Bonavista, Summerville and Musgravetown to Port Blandford.

The highways servicing the Bonavista Peninsula are Route 230 - Discovery Trail & Route 235 - Cabot Highway. Local roads include Route 232, Route 233, Route 234, Route 236, Route 237, Route 238 & Route 239. The Newfoundland Railway also had a branch built from Clarenville to Bonavista, later called the Bonavista Subdivision by CN Rail's Terra Transport division. It was abandoned in 1984, four years before the railway's mainline was abandoned across the island.

== History ==
This peninsula contains some of the oldest settlements on the island of Newfoundland, particularly the towns of Bonavista and Trinity. Italian explorer John Cabot is reported to have landed at Cape Bonavista in 1497 claiming this part of the New World for the King of England.

== Economy ==
The communities and towns on the Bonavista Peninsula are in a slow decline as the importance of the fishing industry decreases. Geographically isolated from major population centres, the provincial government has been attempting to diversify the local economy; most notably in tourism where the region has spectacular landscapes adjacent to the ocean.

== Incorporated Towns ==
The following is a list of the 9 incorporated towns on the Bonavista Peninsula by population in the 2021 Canadian Census.

- Bonavista - 3,190
- Trinity Bay North - 1,649
- George's Brook-Milton - 719
- Musgravetown - 561
- Port Rexton - 361
- Elliston - 315
- Trinity - 182
- King's Cove - 75
- Keels - 46

== Communities ==
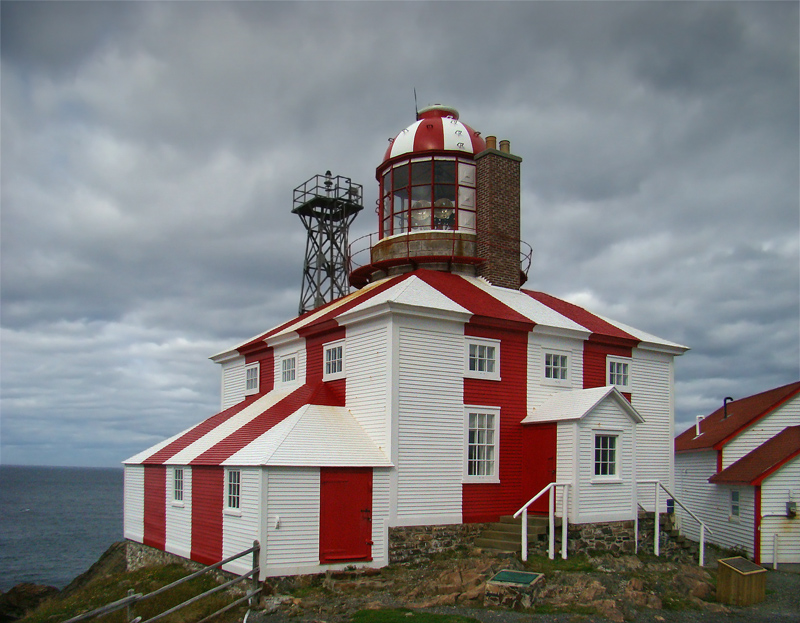
Cape Bonavista

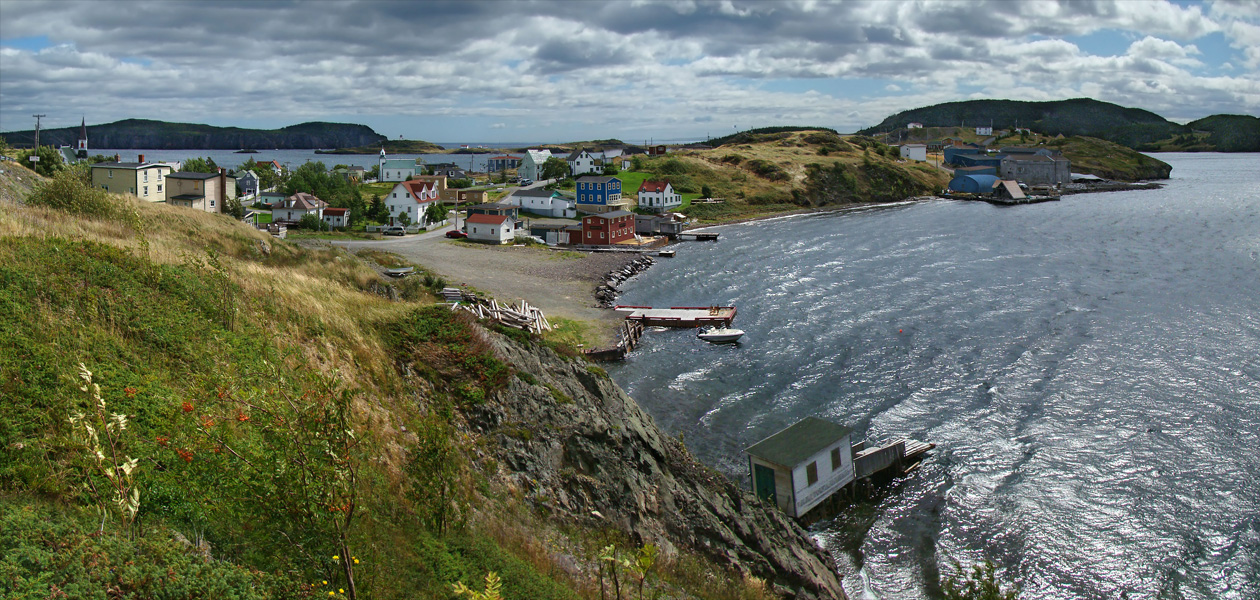
Trinity, on the east coast of the Bonavista Peninsula

The following is a list of the 41 unincorporated communities on the Bonavista Peninsula by population in the 2021 Canadian Census.

- Lethbridge - 619
- Bunyan's Cove - 441
- Bloomfield - 431
- Canning's Cove - 208
- Plate Cove West - 191
- Brooklyn - 181
- Burgoynes Cove - 114
- Newman's Cove - 111
- Dunfield - 104
- Charleston - 91
- Spillars Cove - 80
- Trinity East - 79
- Sweet Bay - 79
- Plate Cove East - 78
- Upper Amherst Cove - 58
- Morley's Siding - 37
- Duntara - 36
- Tickle Cove - 32
- Birchy Cove - 25
- Middle Amherst Cove
- Lower Amherst Cove
- Hodderville
- Knight's Cove
- Stock Cove
- Open Hall
- Red Cliffe
- Summerville
- Princeton
- Southern Bay
- English Harbour
- Champney's
- Champney's West
- Trouty
- Old Bonaventure
- New Bonaventure
- Portland
- Jamestown
- Winter Brook
- Harcourt
- Monroe
- Waterville
- Barton

== See also ==
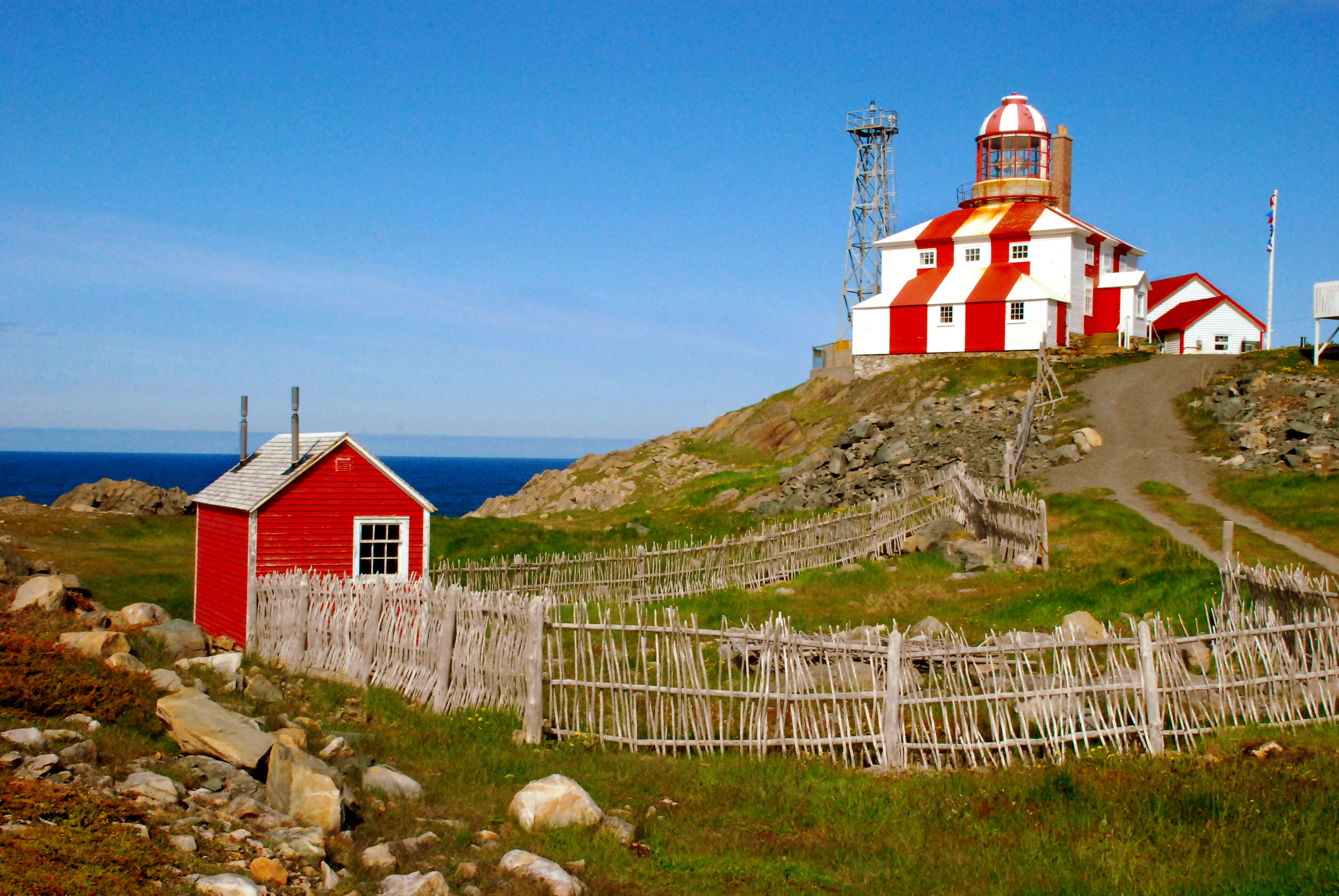
Bonavista lighthouse

- List of communities in Newfoundland and Labrador
- Bonavista Archives
- Cape Bonavista Light
- The Ryan Premises
- The Matthew Replica
