= Port Rexton =

- Town
- Location of Port Rexton in Newfoundland
- Coordinates: 48°23′58″N 53°19′28″W
- Country: Canada
- Province: Newfoundland and Labrador

Area
  - Total: 30.5 km^{2} (11.78 sq mi)

Population (2021)
  - Total: 361
  - Density: 28.9/km^{2} (75/sq mi)
- Time zone: UTC-3:30 (Newfoundland Time)
  - Summer (DST): UTC-2:30 (Newfoundland Daylight)
- Area code: 709
- Highways: Route 230; Route 236
- Website: https://www.townofportrexton.com/

Port Rexton is a small town in the Canadian province of Newfoundland and Labrador. It is located on the East Coast of the island of Newfoundland at the north end of Robinhood Bay, about 10 minutes east of Trinity and 3 hours north of St. John's. The town had a population of 690 in 1940, 449 in 1951, 454 in 1956, 351 in the Canada 2006 Census, 338 in the Canada 2011 Census and most recently 340 in the Canada 2016 Census. The town is part of a group of communities known as the Trinity Bight. The town is home to a few small businesses, including inns and restaurants as well as the Skerwink trail which connects Port Rexton to Trinity Harbour.

== Demographics ==
In the 2021 Census of Population conducted by Statistics Canada, Port Rexton had a population of 361 living in 169 of its 244 total private dwellings, a change of 6.2% from its 2016 population of 340. With a land area of 11.64 km^{2} (4.49 sq mi), it had a population density of 31.0/km^{2} (80.3/sq mi) in 2021.

Historical populations
Year	Pop.	±%
1951	449	—
1956	454	+1.1%
1961	438	−3.5%
1966	404	−7.8%
1971	384	−5.0%
1976	463	+20.6%
1981	489	+5.6%
1986	468	−4.3%
1991	482	+3.0%
1996	439	−8.9%
2001	432	−1.6%
2006	351	−18.8%
2011	338	−3.7%
2016	340	+0.6%
2021	361	+6.2%

== See also ==
- List of cities and towns in Newfoundland and Labrador
