= Champney's West =

- Town
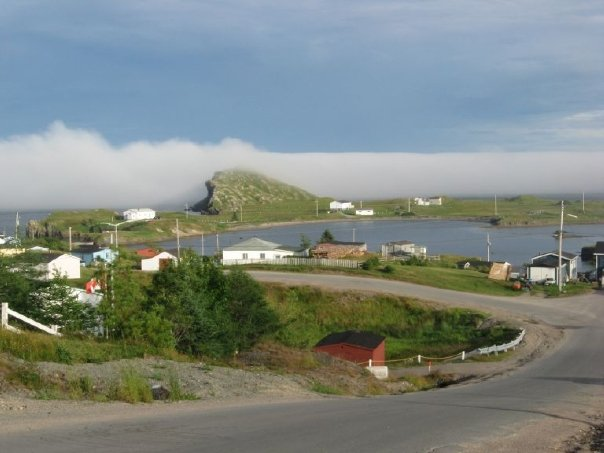
- View of the "Indian Head" from the hill entering Champney's West.
- Interactive map of Champney's West
- Coordinates: 48°23′05″N 53°18′04″W
- Country: Canada
- Province: Newfoundland and Labrador

Population (2006)
  - Total: 432
- Time zone: UTC-3:30 (Newfoundland Time)
  - Summer (DST): UTC-2:30 (Newfoundland Daylight)
- Area code: 709
- Highways: Route 230

Champney's West is a community and former town in the Canadian province of Newfoundland and Labrador. The village had a population of 75 in the Canada 2001 Census, the last year in which Statistics Canada reported data for Champney's West (since then, it is part of the designated place Champneys-English Harbour). The community is part of a group of communities known as Trinity Bight.

== See also ==
- List of cities and towns in Newfoundland and Labrador
