= Trouty =

Coordinates: 48°20′N 53°24′W

- Unincorporated community
- Interactive map of Trouty
- Country: Canada
- Province: Newfoundland and Labrador
- Time zone: UTC-3:30 (Newfoundland Time)
  - Summer (DST): UTC-2:30 (Newfoundland Daylight)
- Area code: 709
- Highways: Route 239

Trouty, Newfoundland and Labrador is a small settlement on the Bonavista Peninsula. It is located in Trinity Bay, southwest of Catalina. It had a population of 178 in 1956.

== See also ==
- List of communities in Newfoundland and Labrador
