= Robinhood Bay =

Natural bay off Newfoundland, Canada

Coordinates: 48.366°N 53.314°W

Location of Robinhood Bay in Newfoundland

Robinhood Bay is a natural bay off the island of Newfoundland in the province of Newfoundland and Labrador, Canada. It cuts into the southern shore of Bonavista Peninsula and opens into Trinity Bay. The town of Port Rexton is situated at the north end of the bay.
