= All Saints Anglican Church (English Harbour, Newfoundland and Labrador) =

Coordinates: 48.373°N 53.264°W

- Interactive map of the All Saints Anglican Church area

General information
- Architectural style: Carpenter Gothic
- Location: English Harbour, Newfoundland and Labrador, Canada
- Construction started: 1888
- Completed: 1889

Technical details
- Structural system: one-storey wood frame

All Saints Anglican Church is a historic Carpenter Gothic style Anglican church building located in English Harbour, Newfoundland and Labrador, Canada. It was opened in 1889 and closed as a church in 2004. Later it was adapted to become an arts centre.

== History ==
The church was built in 1888-1889 out of wood as part of the Anglican Church of Canada. It was constructed to replace an earlier church from 1832 that had burned down in the 1880s. Its steep pitched roof and lancet windows are typical of Gothic Revival churches. The roof was coloured red to act as a navigational aid for sailors around English Harbour due to its location being visible from the water. The church's historic cemetery contains the graves of many area pioneers, including the victims of the Trinity Bay Disaster of 1892 in which numerous fishermen hunting seals in the bay were caught in a sudden freezing storm. The church operated serving the community until 2004 when it was deconsecrated as a church.

All Saints Church including its cemetery is a provincial heritage site as designated by the Heritage Foundation of Newfoundland and Labrador on 7 May 2005. The building was adapted to become an arts and cultural centre under the support of the Heritage Foundation of Newfoundland and Labrador. It was then handed over to be managed by The English Harbour Arts Association with the intent of preserving All Saints and to creating "an economically viable cultural centre."
