= Trinity East =

Human settlement in Newfoundland and Labrador, Canada

Coordinates: 48°23′N 53°20′W

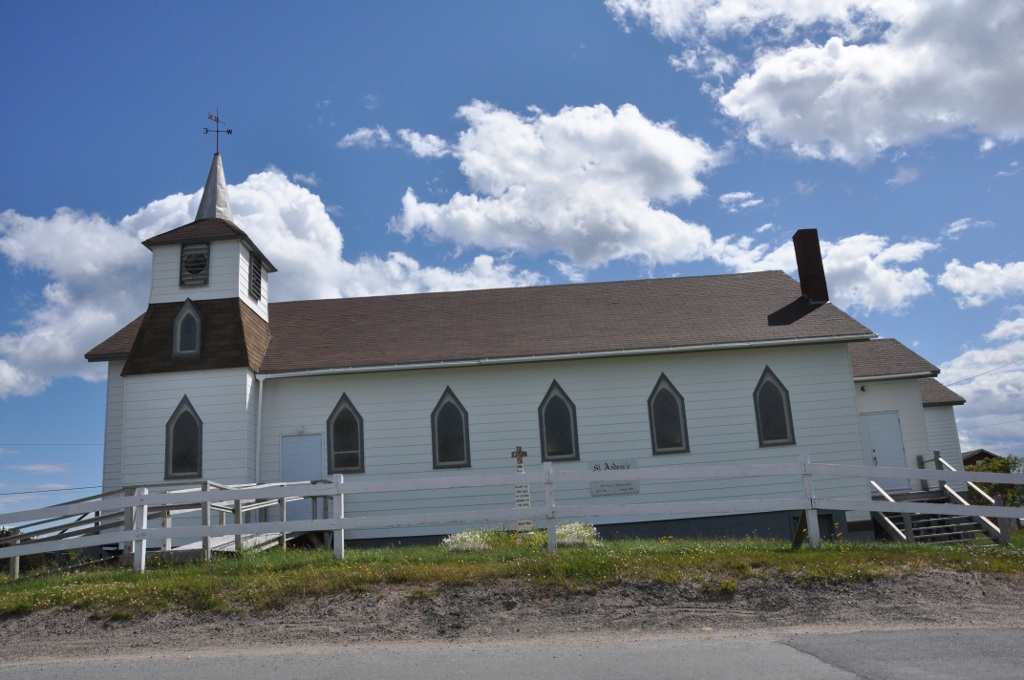
St. Andrew's Church, Trinity East

Trinity East, Newfoundland and Labrador is a designated place in the Canadian province of Newfoundland and Labrador. It is southwest of Catalina on the Bonavista Peninsula.

== History ==
The way office was established in 1879.

== Geography ==
Trinity East is in Newfoundland within Subdivision J of Division No. 7.

== Demographics ==
As a designated place in the 2016 Census of Population conducted by Statistics Canada, Trinity East recorded a population of 70 living in 35 of its 90 total private dwellings, a change of -9.1% from its 2011 population of 77. With a land area of 2.12 km^{2} (0.82 sq mi), it had a population density of 33.0/km^{2} (85.5/sq mi) in 2016.

== See also ==
- List of communities in Newfoundland and Labrador
- List of designated places in Newfoundland and Labrador
