= Maberly (surname) =

Maberly is a surname. Notable people with the surname include:

- Kate Maberly (born 1984), English actress and singer songwriter
- Polly Maberly (born 1976), English actress
- John Maberly (1777–1845), British entrepreneur, banker and politician
- William Leader Maberly (1798–1885), British army officer and politician
