= Trinity Bay North =

- Town
- Location of Trinity Bay North in Newfoundland
- Coordinates: 48°29′52.07″N 53°5′9.44″W
- Country: Canada
- Province: Newfoundland and Labrador
- Incorporated: 2005

Government
  - Mayor: Dean Lodge

Area
  - Total: 25.43 km^{2} (9.82 sq mi)

Population (2021)
  - Total: 1,649
  - Density: 71.5/km^{2} (185/sq mi)
- Time zone: UTC-3:30 (Newfoundland Time)
  - Summer (DST): UTC-2:30 (Newfoundland Daylight)
- Area code: 709
- Highways: Route 230; Route 237
- Website: Trinity Bay North official website

Trinity Bay North is a town in the Canadian province of Newfoundland and Labrador. It is located at the northern tip of Trinity Bay. The town had a population of 1,649 in the Canada 2021 Census.

== History ==
Trinity Bay North was incorporated in 2005 with the amalgamation of the towns of Catalina, Melrose, and Port Union. The town of Little Catalina later joined the municipality in an annexation.

== Demographics ==
In the 2021 Census of Population conducted by Statistics Canada, Trinity Bay North had a population of 1,649 living in 778 of its 886 total private dwellings, a change of −9.3% from its 2016 population of 1,819. With a land area of 26.19 km^{2} (10.11 sq mi), it had a population density of 63.0/km^{2} (163.1/sq mi) in 2021.

== Government ==
The mayor of Trinity Bay North is Dean Lodge.

The deputy mayor of Trinity Bay North is Terence Stead.

== See also ==
- List of cities and towns in Newfoundland and Labrador
