= Port Union, Newfoundland and Labrador =

Settlement in Newfoundland and Labrador

Coordinates: 48°29′51″N 53°05′04″W

Port Union
- Settlement
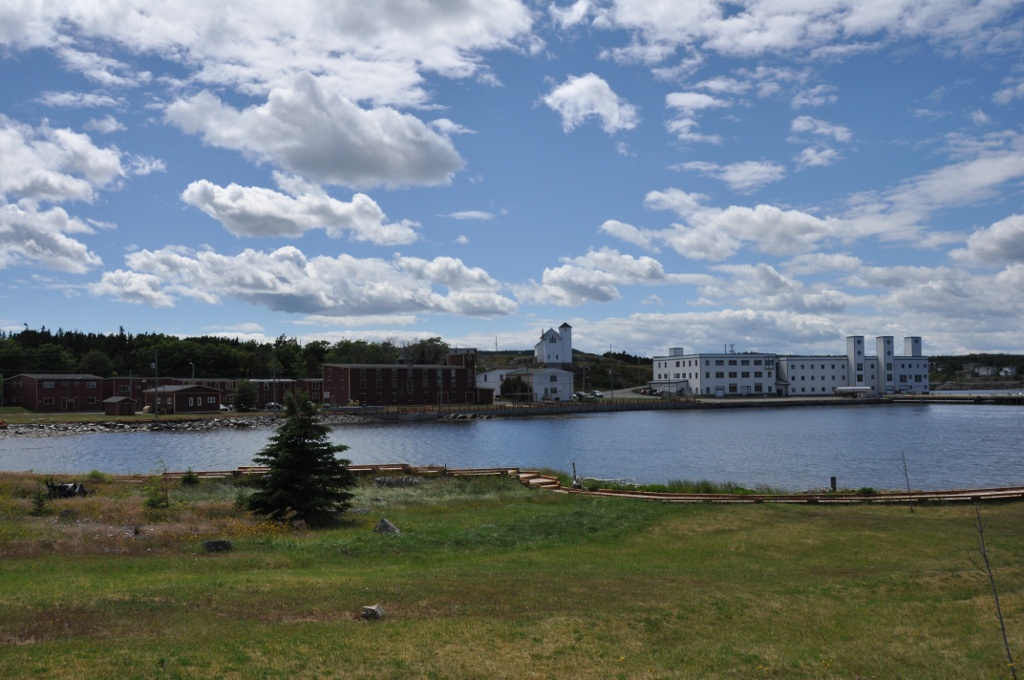
- View of Port Union's historic buildings
- Interactive map of Port Union
- Country: Canada
- Province: Newfoundland and Labrador
- Founded by: Sir William Coaker
- Time zone: UTC-3:30 (Newfoundland Time)
  - Summer (DST): UTC-2:30 (Newfoundland Daylight)
- Area code: 709

National Historic Site of Canada
- Official name: Port Union Historic District National Historic Site of Canada
- Designated: 1999
- Highways: Route 230

Port Union is a historical community overlooking Trinity Bay and Catalina Harbour, on the east side of the Bonavista Peninsula, Newfoundland and Labrador, Canada. It is the only union-built town in North America.

William Coaker founded the town as the base for the Fishermen's Protective Union in 1916. It was the base for the publication of the Fishermen's Advocate journal.

In 1999, the original part of the town and the nearby hydroelectric plant were designated a National Historic Site of Canada.

In 2005, Port Union was amalgamated with Catalina and Melrose to form the town of Trinity Bay North.

In 2012, the local fish plant closed.

== See also ==
- Fishermen's Protective Union
- List of communities in Newfoundland and Labrador
- Newfoundland outport
