= Shoal Harbour =

- A wood carving of the town seal of Shoal Harbour on display at Memorial University of Newfoundland

- Location within Newfoundland
- Coordinates: 48°11′N 53°59′W
- Country: Canada
- Province: Newfoundland and Labrador
- Census division: Division No. 7
- Elevation: 0–74 m (0–243 ft)
- Lowest elevation: 0 m (0 ft)
- Time zone: UTC−3:30 (NST)
  - Summer (DST): UTC−2:30 (NDT)
- Postal codes: A2N
- Area code: 709
- Telephone Exchange: 643, 283, 214, 649, 641 and 721

Shoal Harbour is a small community in Newfoundland and Labrador, Canada. It is part of the Town of Clarenville and just north of Clarenville proper.

== See also ==
- List of communities in Newfoundland and Labrador
