= Spillars Cove, Trinity Bay =

Spillars Cove
- Local service district / designated place
- Location within Newfoundland and Labrador
- Country: Canada
- Province: Newfoundland and Labrador

Population (2011)
  - Total: 65
- Time zone: UTC-3:30 (Newfoundland Time)
  - Summer (DST): UTC-2:30 (Newfoundland Daylight)
- Area code: 709

Spillars Cove is a local service district and designated place in the Canadian province of Newfoundland and Labrador. It is just outside Bonavista.

== Geography ==
Spillars Cove is in Newfoundland within Subdivision I of Division No. 7.

== Demographics ==
As a designated place in the 2016 Census of Population conducted by Statistics Canada, Spillars Cove recorded a population of 71 living in 39 of its 46 total private dwellings, a change of −18.4% from its 2011 population of 87. With a land area of 2.2 km^{2} (0.85 sq mi), it had a population density of 32.3/km^{2} (83.6/sq mi) in 2016.

== Government ==
Spillars Cove is a local service district (LSD) that is governed by a committee responsible for the provision of certain services to the community.

== See also ==
- List of communities in Newfoundland and Labrador
- List of designated places in Newfoundland and Labrador
- List of local service districts in Newfoundland and Labrador
