= English Harbour, Newfoundland and Labrador =

English Harbour
- Unincorporated Community
- Location of English Harbour in Newfoundland
- Coordinates: 48°22′20″N 53°15′45″W
- Country: Canada
- Province: Newfoundland and Labrador

Government
- Time zone: UTC-3:30 (Newfoundland Time)
  - Summer (DST): UTC-2:30 (Newfoundland Daylight)
- Area code: 709

English Harbour is a community in Trinity Bay, Newfoundland and Labrador. The Way Office was established in 1883 and the first Waymaster was Henry G. Batson. It had a population of 190 in 1956. It is the home of All Saints Anglican Church, a provincial heritage site. The church contains the English Harbour Arts Centre,. The Centre is used for musical and theatrical productions in the summer season. The English Harbour Arts Association (a not for profit charitable organization) was founded in 2004 to save the old church from demolition and find a new role for it.

== See also ==
- List of communities in Newfoundland and Labrador
- English Harbour East, Newfoundland and Labrador
- English Harbour West, Newfoundland and Labrador
- Trinity Bight, Newfoundland and Labrador
