= Dunfield, Newfoundland and Labrador =

Local service district in Canada

Coordinates: 48°21′00″N 53°23′00″W

Dunfield is a local service district and designated place in the Canadian province of Newfoundland and Labrador. It is southwest of Catalina. It had a population of 222 in 1940, 193 in 1951 and 210 in 1956. Renamed in 1913, the present day Dunfield was once the community of Cuckold's Cove.

== Geography ==
Dunfield is in Newfoundland within Subdivision J of Division No. 7.

== Demographics ==
As a designated place in the 2016 Census of Population conducted by Statistics Canada, Dunfield recorded a population of 78 living in 39 of its 46 total private dwellings, a change of -6% from its 2011 population of 83. With a land area of 1.83 km^{2} (0.71 sq mi), it had a population density of 42.6/km^{2} (110.4/sq mi) in 2016.

== Government ==
Dunfield is a local service district (LSD) that is governed by a committee responsible for the provision of certain services to the community. The chair of the LSD committee is Vacant.

== See also ==
- List of communities in Newfoundland and Labrador
- List of designated places in Newfoundland and Labrador
- List of local service districts in Newfoundland and Labrador
