= Lockston =

Settlement in Newfoundland and Labrador

- Settlement
- Interactive map of Lockston
- Coordinates: 48°23′47″N 53°22′32″W
- Country: Canada
- Province: Newfoundland and Labrador
- Region: Trinity Bay
- Time zone: UTC−3:30 (Newfoundland Time Zone)
  - Summer (DST): UTC−2:30 (Newfoundland Daylight Time)
- Area code: 709

Lockston is a settlement located near Trinity, Newfoundland and Labrador.

== See also ==
- List of communities in Newfoundland and Labrador
