= Ryan Premises =

National historical site of Canada

Coordinates: 48.647796°N 53.112931°W

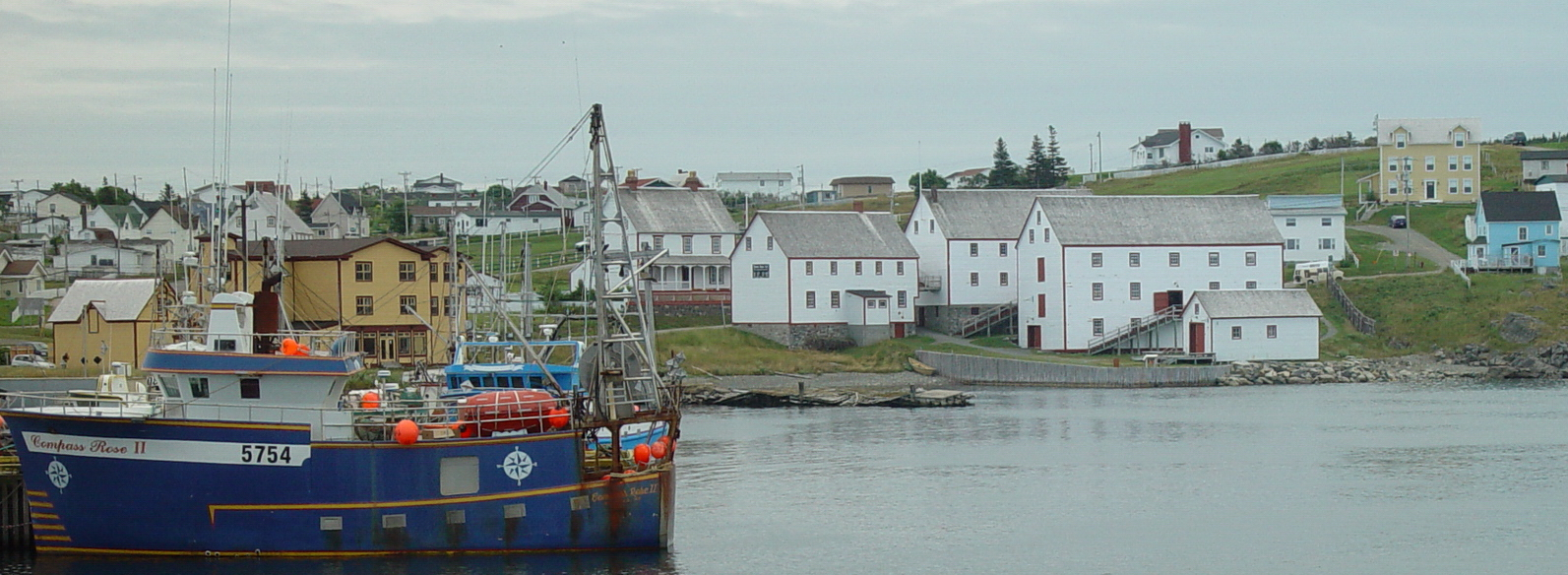
Ryan Premises (group of red-trimmed white buildings) in Bonavista, Newfoundland and Labrador

The Ryan Premises is a group of buildings that belonged to fishing and retail company James Ryan Ltd. in Bonavista, Newfoundland and Labrador, Canada. A National Historic Site of Canada, it is preserved as an example of a large-scale merchant operation in a Newfoundland outport.

The site consists of the proprietor's house, a carriage shed, a retail shop, a retail store, a fish store and a salt store. The staff house, adjacent to but not part of the historical site, is a Registered Heritage Structure. Earlier, the premises also included a larger salt store, a cooperage, a powder magazine, a telegraph office, wharves, fish flakes, a lumber yard and a shipyard.

== History ==
James Ryan Ltd. was established in the Bayley's Cove section of Bonavista in 1857 where it operated a pub as well as a retail store. The main operation was relocated to its present location on Bonavista harbour in 1869 and liquor was only sold in bulk and the fishery became the main focus. The company bought and sold salt cod, supplied salt and other materials for the cod fishery, and sold general merchandise. By 1895 James Ryan Ltd. exported 100,000 quintals (approximately 5,000,000 kg) of salt cod, approximately 10% of the total for Newfoundland. James Ryan Ltd. exited the fishing industry in 1952 and continued on as a general store until closing in 1978. In 1987, the Ryan Premises at Bonavista were designated as a National Historic Site. Parks Canada took over the property and it was officially opened to the public by Queen Elizabeth II on June 24, 1997 to mark the 500th anniversary of John Cabot's landfall at Bonavista.
