= Sweet Bay, Newfoundland and Labrador =

Settlement in Newfoundland and Labrador

Coordinates: 48.444°N 53.650°W

Location of Sweet Bay in Newfoundland and Labrador

Sweet Bay is a settlement in Newfoundland and Labrador. It is part of the local service district of Lethbridge and Area.

It was settled sometime in the early 1800s, primarily as a fishing settlement.
