= Little Catalina =

- Former town
- Interactive map of Little Catalina
- Coordinates: 48°32′58″N 53°03′25″W
- Country: Canada
- Province: Newfoundland and Labrador

Population (2006)
  - Total: 458
- Time zone: UTC-3:30 (Newfoundland Time)
  - Summer (DST): UTC-2:30 (Newfoundland Daylight)
- Area code: 709
- Highways: Route 230

Little Catalina is a community in the Canadian province of Newfoundland and Labrador. The town had a population of 458 in the Canada 2006 Census.

== See also ==
- List of cities and towns in Newfoundland and Labrador
