= Elliston, Newfoundland and Labrador =

Elliston Bird Island Cove
- Town
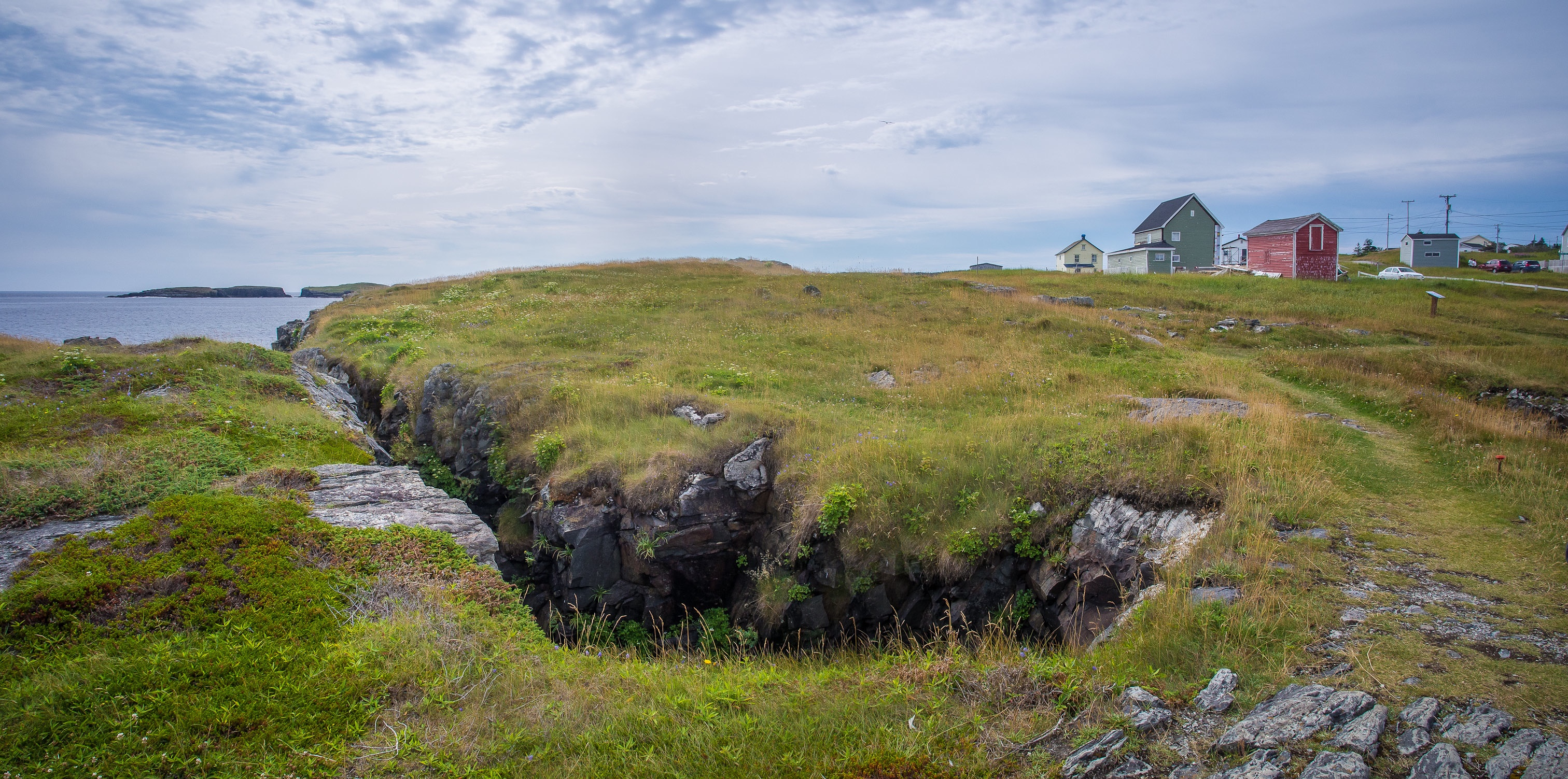
- Nickname: Root Cellar Capital of the World
- Location of Elliston in Newfoundland
- Coordinates: 48°37′53″N 53°02′06″W
- Country: Canada
- Province: Newfoundland and Labrador
- Incorporated: 1965

Government
  - Mayor: Derek Martin
  - Deputy Mayor: Geraldine Baker
  - Councillors: Jabez Chaulk, Blair Templeman, Harriet Tilley

Area
  - Total: 10.05 km^{2} (3.88 sq mi)

Population (2021)
  - Total: 315
  - Density: 30.7/km^{2} (80/sq mi)
- Time zone: UTC-3:30 (Newfoundland Time)
  - Summer (DST): UTC-2:30 (Newfoundland Daylight)
- Area code: 709
- Highways: Route 238
- Website: https://www.townofelliston.ca/

Elliston is an incorporated fishing settlement situated on the Bonavista Peninsula of Newfoundland, Canada. Incorporated in 1965, the town of Elliston was once called Bird Island Cove and it is composed of a number of communities, North Side, Noder Cover, Elliston Centre, Elliston Point, Porter's Point, Sandy Cove, The Neck and Maberly. Elliston is known as the Root Cellar Capital of the World and has claimed that title from the 135 root cellars that exist in the community.

In 2013, parts of the movie The Grand Seduction were filmed at Elliston.

Elliston is home to a puffin viewing site which serves as a popular tourist attraction from May to September.

== History ==
Elliston, originally known as Bird Island Cove, was settled in the early 19th century, primarily by fishing families attracted to the rich marine resources of the region. In 1902, the town was renamed Elliston by Reverend Charles Lench to honour in honor of Reverend William Ellis, the first Methodist missionary in this town.

In 2010, discussions were held about the potential annexation of Elliston by the nearby town of Bonavista The proposal arose from concerns about the economic sustainability and administrative challenges of smaller municipalities in the region. A feasibility study was conducted to explore the benefits and drawbacks of merging services and governance. However, the idea was met with mixed reactions from residents, and the annexation did not proceed. Elliston continues to operate as an independent municipality.

=== James Ryan Shop Registered Heritage Structure ===
The James Ryan Shop is a two-and-a-half storey building with a steeply pitched gable roof, built in 1900. The shop was added to the Canadian Register on February 8, 2005

== Events ==
The Roots, Rants and Roars festival is filled with Elliston's music and food, with a competition called Cod Wars where chefs make the most creative and original dishes featuring cod.

The John C. Crosbie Sealers Interpretation Centre is located in Elliston.

== Demographics ==
In the 2021 Census of Population conducted by Statistics Canada, Elliston had a population of 315 living in 148 of its 198 total private dwellings, a change of 2.3% from its 2016 population of 308. With a land area of 10.07 km^{2} (3.89 sq mi), it had a population density of 31.3/km^{2} (81.0/sq mi) in 2021.

Historical populations
Year	Pop.	±%
1951	574	—
1956	699	+21.8%
1961	678	−3.0%
1966	691	+1.9%
1971	551	−20.3%
1976	540	−2.0%
1981	527	−2.4%
1986	564	+7.0%
1991	533	−5.5%
1996	461	−13.5%
2001	360	−21.9%
2006	306	−15.0%
2011	337	+10.1%
2016	308	−8.6%
2021	315	+2.3%

== See also ==
- List of cities and towns in Newfoundland and Labrador
- List of people of Newfoundland and Labrador
