= New Bonaventure =

Small harbour in Newfoundland and Labrador, Canada

Coordinates: 48°17′07″N 53°26′44″W

Old Bonaventure is a small outport and harbour in the Trinity Bight area of Trinity Bay that was originally settled by English emigrants seeking a new life in the "New Founde Lande". It had a population of 85 in 1951 and 100 in 1956. Old Bonaventure's recently deepened natural harbour today serves as a point of delivery for a variety of off-shore fishing boats. "Old Bonaventure" was simply "Bonavenute" until the arrival of new settlers or "planters" led to the creation of New Bonaventure which absorbed the newcomers from England in the 19th century.

New Bonaventure is a small fishing community located on the Northeast shore of Trinity Bay, Newfoundland and Labrador, Canada. It had a population of 73 in 1940 and 61 in 1956. It served as the filming location for scenes in the 2001 film The Shipping News.

== See also ==
- List of communities in Newfoundland and Labrador
