= Clarenville =

- Town
- Town of Clarenville
- Seal
- Nickname: Hub of the East Coast
- Motto: "Real Life Potential"
- Location of Clarenville in Newfoundland
- Coordinates: 48°9′23.72″N 53°57′54.18″W
- Country: Canada
- Province: Newfoundland and Labrador
- Incorporated (town): 1951

Government
  - Type: Clarenville Town Council
  - Mayor: John Pickett
  - Member of Parliament: Jonathan Rowe

Area
  - Total: 140.81 km^{2} (54.37 sq mi)
- Elevation: 43 m (141 ft)

Population (2021)
  - Total: 6,704
  - Density: 44.7/km^{2} (116/sq mi)
- Time zone: UTC-3:30 (Newfoundland Time)
  - Summer (DST): UTC-2:30 (Newfoundland Daylight)
- Postal code span: A5A
- Area code: 709
- Highways: Route 1 (TCH); Route 230; Route 230A
- Website: https://clarenville.ca/

Clarenville is a town on the east coast of Newfoundland in the province of Newfoundland and Labrador, Canada. Clarenville was incorporated in 1951. It is located in the Shoal Harbour valley, fronting an arm of the Atlantic Ocean called Random Sound.

The town grew in importance after it became a junction on the Newfoundland Railway, where a branch line to the Bonavista Peninsula left the main line. The construction of the Trans-Canada Highway through the community in the 1960s resulted in it becoming a local service centre for central-eastern Newfoundland, serving 96,000 people living in 90 communities within a 100 km radius. Clarenville is centrally located and within two hours' driving time of 70% of the province's population.

The town is a natural gateway to the Discovery Trail, extending down the Bonavista Peninsula to Trinity and Bonavista, reputed site of the first landing of European explorer John Cabot. The trail is a panorama of scenery, historic sites, coastal towns and villages.

TAT-1 (the first transatlantic telephone cable) was laid between Clarenville and Gallanach Bay, Oban between 1955 and 1956 by the cable ship Monarch.

== Geography ==
Clarenville is near the centre of three peninsulas: Avalon, Burin, and Bonavista. Route 1 (the Trans-Canada Highway) and Route 230 pass through the town, linking Clarenville to the Bonavista Bay area and to the rest of the provincial road network.

The Clarenville area has many of the physical features characteristic of the East Coast of Newfoundland and has a marine climate. It lies along the coastal slopes which rise from the Atlantic Ocean towards the interior central plateau of the island. The dominating physical feature is a ridge of broken peaks which rise to heights up to 152 meters above sea level parallel to the coast line. Bare Mountain, with an elevation of 156 meters above sea level, dominates the skyline in the northern part of the town. This ridge falls sharply towards the sea so that its coastal edge is characterized by moderate to severe slopes.

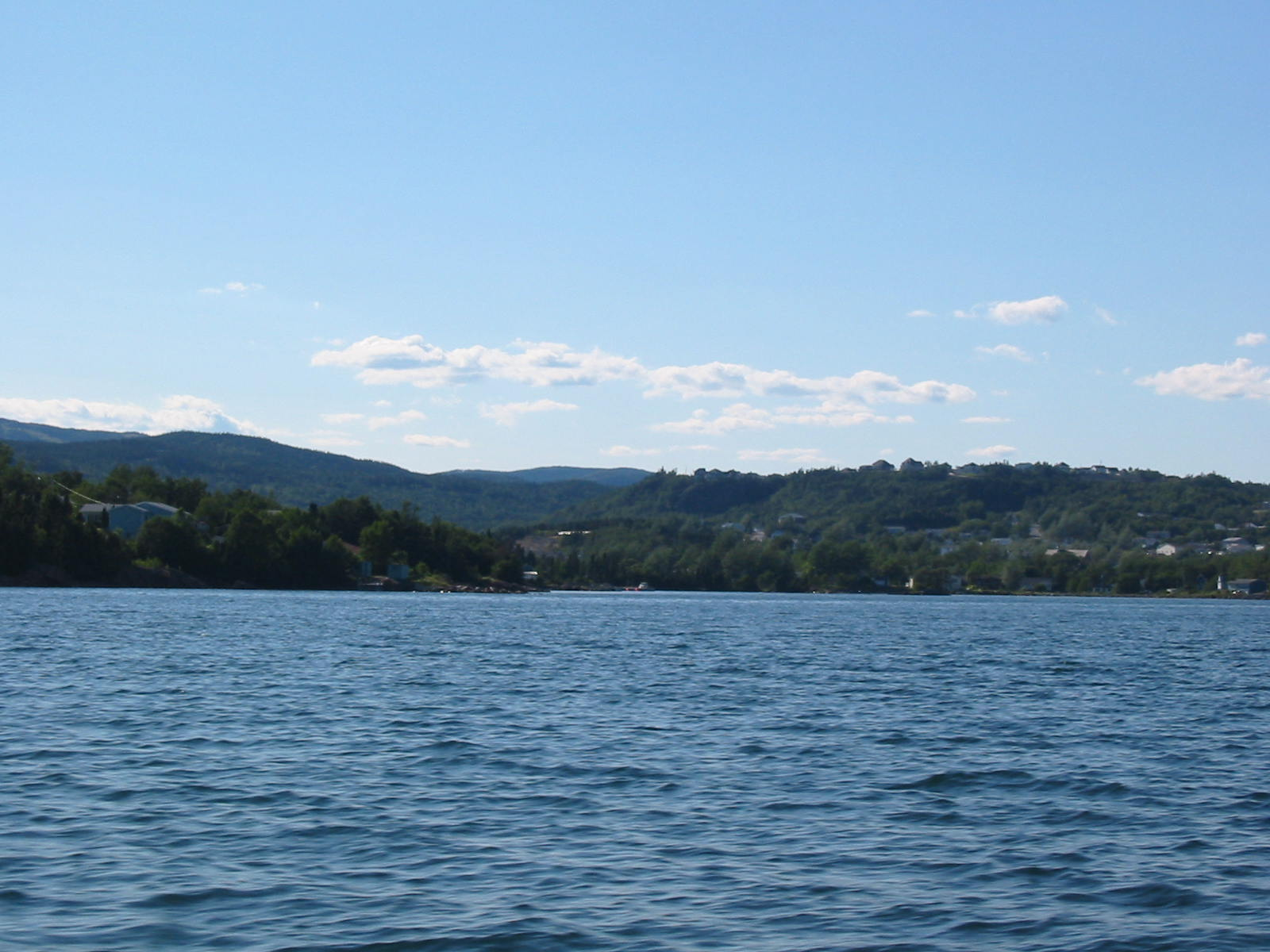
Harbour View of Clarenville

Towards the southern part of Clarenville, the ridge is broken by a series of valleys which have cut their way through from the coast. The most notable of these is the valley formed by the Lower Shoal Harbour River and Dark Hole Brook and their seaward extension of Lower Shoal Harbour, a shallow and narrow indentation of the sea marked by small rock islands and tidal mud flats. The flats surrounding the river are marshy and subjected to flooding during spring runoff. The river serves as the main drainage course for the area behind the coastal ridge.

Clarenville has developed in a narrow strip between the coastal ridge and the sea. The average width of the corridor is between 450 and 600 meters. Located at the most westerly end of an in-drift called Random Sound, extending 25 km inland behind Random Island. As probably the deepest, best sheltered, ice-free port on Newfoundland's east coast, Clarenville is suited for commercial shipping and recreational boating.

== History ==
There is no definite date for the first settlement of what is now Clarenville. William Cowan owned a sawmill at Lower Shoal Harbour around 1848 and this was bought by Joseph Tilley and James Summers of Hants Harbour. They settled here. Settlers also arrived at Dark Hole (or Dark Harbour). The families that made up this community were the Balsoms, Pearces, Vardys, and Seawards. Settlers also arrived at Brook Cove (the Burseys), Broad Cove (the Strongs, Adeys), and Red Beach (the Stanleys). These five communities became part of a new community known as Clarenceville in 1892 when the railway came through.

There are two versions of the origin of Clarenville's name. It has been attributed to a memorial to the Duke of Clarence, eldest son of the then Prince of Wales (later King Edward VII) who died in 1892. The other version is that it was named for a son of Premier Sir William Whiteway. However, Whiteway had no son by that name. By 1901, Clarenville was the way everyone spelled the name and it has remained that way.

A wood carving of the town seal of Clarenville on display at Memorial University of Newfoundland.

John Tilley and his family were the first settlers of Lower Shoal Harbour. They traveled from Hants Harbour in 1848 because of the abundance of timber here. Many referred to him as "Scholar John", as he had taught himself how to read and write. As a young man, he married Elizabeth Bursey of Old Perlican and they had four sons and six daughters. Being one of the earliest Justices of the Peace licensed to perform marriages in Newfoundland, John Tilley performed the marriage of his own daughter. Church records show that Tilley's name appears several times in the late 1830s and 1840s, when there was apparently no minister or missionary available. When the Tilleys arrived, the first thing they had to do was build a log cottage which would be a temporary structure. They later built a saw mill so they could build a standard-size home. Along with the saw mill, the Tilleys became involved with fox farming, gardening, coopering, blacksmithing, fishing and fish canning. John Tilley and Sons were the first tinning operation to tin salmon in Newfoundland (the first salmon was tinned by Tilley and Sons). Shortly after Scholar John tinned his first salmon he learned of a fishery exhibition. He sent a sample to the exhibition and received a prize in the form of a bronze medal with the inscription: "Warranted to keep free from taint and to retain its purity and nutritious quality, in any climate for many years." Later, Scholar John and his sons Aaron and Moses Tilley, with help from John's son-in-law David Palmer, built the first church in Shoal Harbour.

In 1993, Clarenville and Shoal Harbour were amalgamated.

=== Clarenville Railway Station Registered Heritage Structure ===
Constructed in 1942, the Clarenville Railway Station is,a rectangular, single-storey, wooden, hip-roofed building with large overhanging eaves, and was designated as a Registered Heritage Structure by the Heritage Foundation of Newfoundland and Labrador in 2014.

== Recreation ==
Clarenville held the 1994 Newfoundland Winter Games and the 1997 National Under 17 Men's Softball Tournament. In November 2010, the town also hosted two games of the Four Nations Cup. Clarenville has recreational facilities including a health club with an indoor pool, three softball diamonds (one lit by night), a soccer pitch with a running track, and a recreation complex with three regulation size volleyball courts. The newly constructed Clarenville Events Centre includes a theatre, a rink for hockey, figure skating and curling, and is home to the Clarenville Caribous. Nearby are three golf courses, hiking trails, snowmobiling country. Clarenville has the only ski resort east of Corner Brook, called White Hills Ski Resort. White Hills is also home to The New Curtain Theatre Company at The Loft Theatre.

== Demographics ==
In the 2021 Census of Population conducted by Statistics Canada, Clarenville had a population of 6,704 living in 2,804 of its 3,123 total private dwellings, a change of 6.6% from its 2016 population of 6,291. With a land area of 139.91 km^{2} (54.02 sq mi), it had a population density of 47.9/km^{2} (124.1/sq mi) in 2021.

Historical population
Year	Pop.	±%
1951	1,093	—
1956	1,195	+9.3%
1961	1,541	+29.0%
1966	1,813	+17.7%
1971	2,193	+21.0%
1976	2,807	+28.0%
1981	2,878	+2.5%
1986	2,967	+3.1%
1991	3,071	+3.5%
1996	5,335	+73.7%
2001	5,104	−4.3%
2006	5,274	+3.3%
2011	6,036	+14.4%
2016	6,291	+4.2%
2021	6,704	+6.6%

== See also ==
- List of cities and towns in Newfoundland and Labrador
- List of communities in Newfoundland and Labrador
- Clarenville Airport
