= Bonavista, Newfoundland and Labrador =

Bonavista
- Town
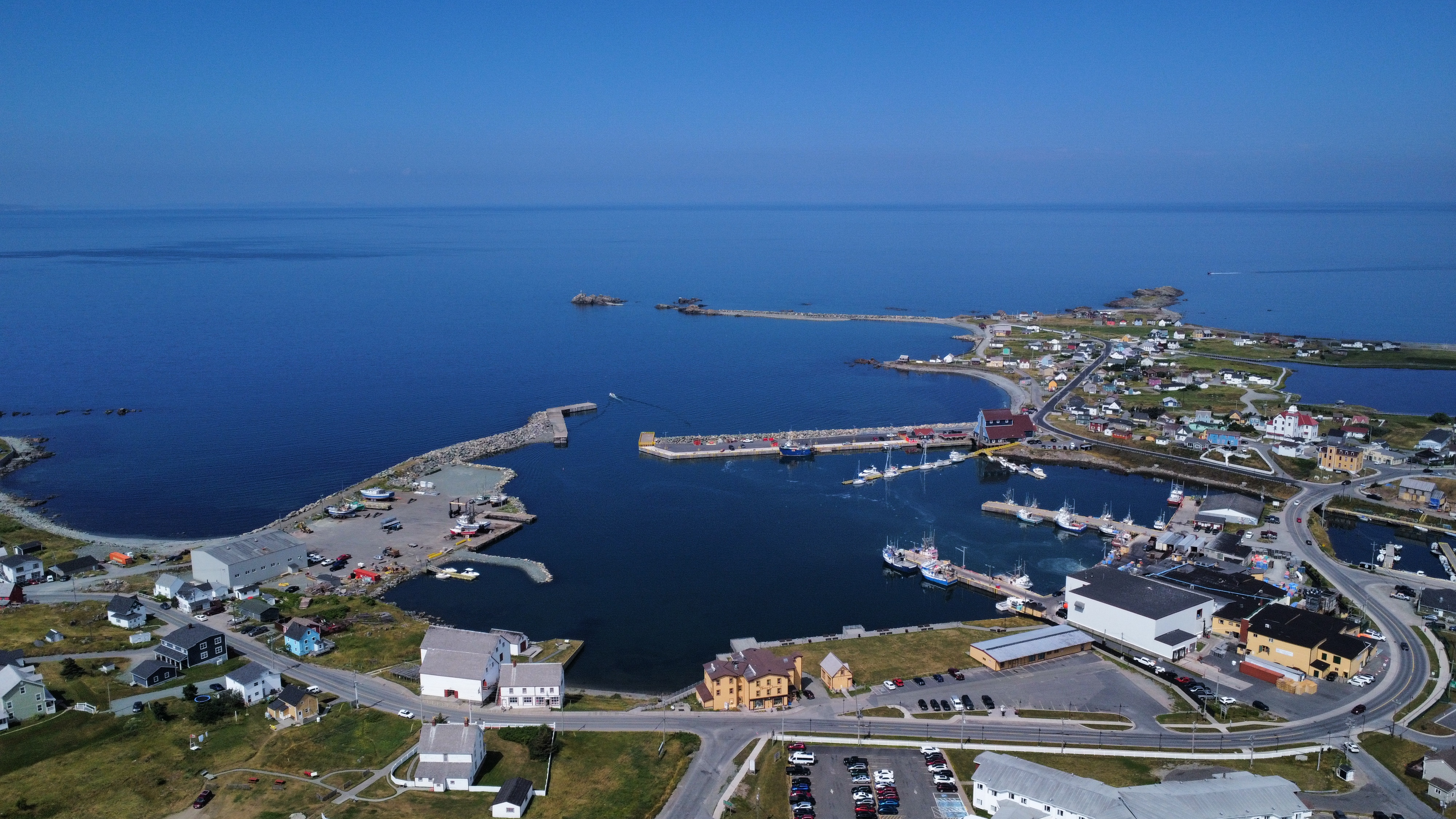
- An aerial photograph of the Bonavista Harbour

- Location of Bonavista in Newfoundland
- Coordinates: 48°39′35″N 53°07′15″W
- Country: Canada
- Province: Newfoundland and Labrador

Government
  - Type: Municipal Government
  - Mayor: John Norman
  - Deputy Mayor: Reginald Butler

Area (2021)
  - Land: 31.5 km^{2} (12.2 sq mi)

Population (2021)
  - Total: 3,190
  - Density: 109.4/km^{2} (283/sq mi)
- Time zone: UTC−03:30 (NST)
  - Summer (DST): UTC−02:30 (NDT)
- Area code: 709
- Highways: Route 230; Route 235; Route 238
- Website: www.townofbonavista.com

Bonavista (2021 population: 3,190) is a town on the Bonavista Peninsula, Newfoundland in the Canadian province of Newfoundland and Labrador. Unlike many Newfoundland coastal settlements, Bonavista was built on an open plain, not in a steep cove; thus, the community had room to expand to its current area of 31.5 km^{2} (12.2 sq mi). Bonavista is located approximately 300 km by road from the provincial capital of St. John's.

== History ==
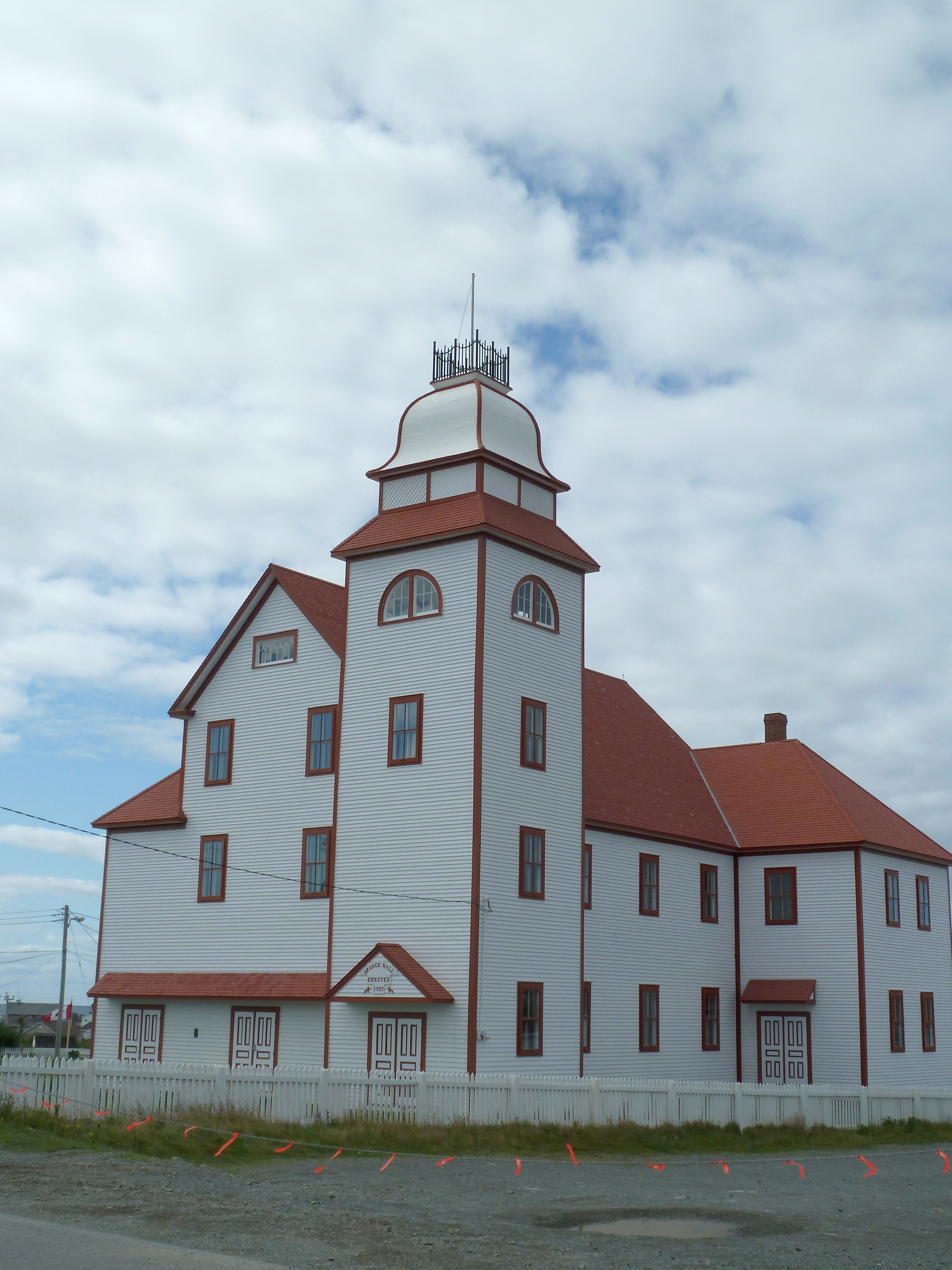
Bonavista Loyal Orange Lodge

John Cabot (Giovanni Caboto), a freelance Italian explorer, was contracted by England's Henry VII to find new lands, and a sea route to the Orient. Cabot set sail from Bristol, England in his ship the Matthew in 1497. When Cabot first saw land he reputedly said "O Buon Vista" ("Oh, Happy Sight!") giving rise to the name of the town and nearby Cape Bonavista. Cabot landed with "a crucifix and raised banners with the arms of the Holy Father and those of the King of England". The land was inhabited, as the expedition found a trail leading inland, a site where a fire had been, and "a stick half a yard long pierced at both ends, carved and painted with brazil". The harbour was not ideal, eventually requiring the construction of several breakwaters. Despite this Bonavista became one of the most important towns in Newfoundland due to its proximity to the rich fishing and sealing grounds to the north of the peninsula. The Spanish, Portuguese, Dutch, French and English fished off Cape Bonavista during the 16th century, but the Spanish and Portuguese presence soon declined, leaving the French and English as the dominant powers. Tension between the French and English sometimes resulted in military action, including an unsuccessful attempt in 1704 by the French to burn the town. The French Shore, which had Bonavista as its eastern terminus, was established by the Treaty of Utrecht in 1713. Fishing rights in the area continued to be a source of tension between the French and English.

Bonavista was a major commercial centre and the evidence for this is preserved at the Ryan Premises, a National Historic Site maintained by Parks Canada. It is a restored example of a large fish merchant's operation.

Bonavista's status was further enhanced by the development of the Fishermen's Protective Union in the early 20th century, and the creation of nearby Port Union. During the peak years of 1891–1901, the Bonavista Peninsula's population of about 20,000 was centred in Bonavista. The Bonavista Cold Storage Co. fish plant, now a Fishery Products International operation, became the centre of fishery production after the decline of salt fish markets.

In 1722, the first school in Newfoundland was built in Bonavista by Rev. Henry Jones.

In the late 19th and early 20th centuries, Bonavista became a primary center for the Loyal Orange Association in Newfoundland. Founded as Bonavista Loyal Orange Lodge (LOL), No. 4, the organization grew to become the largest Orange Lodge in British North America, boasting a membership of over 470 men by the early 1900s.

The Lodge played a role in the community's social safety net, functioning as a mutual aid society that provided insurance and support for families of fishermen lost at sea. In 1907, the Lodge commissioned local master builder Ronald Strathie to construct the Bonavista Orange Hall. The massive two-and-a-half-story wooden structure, topped by a distinctive four-story domed tower, served as a vital navigational landmark for the local fishing fleet. It is believed to be the largest wooden gathering hall ever constructed in Canada.

The Hall was also a site of significant political history. In 1912, it hosted the convention of the Fishermen's Protective Union (FPU), where leader William Coaker delivered the "Bonavista Platform." This manifesto demanded radical reforms to the Newfoundland fishery and governance, marking a turning point in the province's labor movement.

The building was designated a Registered Heritage Structure in 1997. Today, it stands as a symbol of the "Orange and Black" tradition, which refers to the senior Royal Black Preceptory, No. 1162, which also met there and the town's historical prominence as a Protestant merchant and fishing hub.

In 1964, the settlement of Bonavista was incorporated into the town of Bonavista.

In 2010, discussions were held about the potential annexation of Elliston by Bonavista. The proposal arose from concerns about the economic sustainability and administrative challenges of smaller municipalities in the region. A feasibility study was conducted to explore the benefits and drawbacks of merging services and governance. However, the idea was met with mixed reactions from residents, and the annexation did not proceed. Elliston continues to operate as an independent municipality.

In the 20th century, the town's economy switched to being tourism-focused. In 2023, it was reported that up to 80,000 visited each summer, leading to many houses to be converted into vacation rentals (more than 120 in 2023). These conversions flipped the housing market of the town, which twenty years earlier had seen many vacant houses, into one of shortage. As of 2023 a freeze on new vacation rental conversions was declared.

== Demographics ==
Historical populations Bonavista, NL
Year	Pop.	±%
1891	3,551	—
1951	3,718	+4.7%
1956	4,078	+9.7%
1961	4,186	+2.6%
1966	4,192	+0.1%
1971	4,215	+0.5%
1976	4,299	+2.0%
1981	4,460	+3.7%
1986	4,605	+3.3%
1991	4,597	−0.2%
1996	4,526	−1.5%
2001	4,021	−11.2%
2006	3,764	−6.4%
2011	3,589	−4.6%
2016	3,448	−3.9%
2021	3,190	−7.5%

In the 2021 Census of Population conducted by Statistics Canada, Bonavista had a population of 3,190 living in 1,470 of its 1,732 total private dwellings, a change of −7.5% from its 2016 population of 3,448. With a land area of 31.56 km^{2} (12.19 sq mi), it had a population density of 101.1/km^{2} (261.8/sq mi) in 2021.

== Climate ==
Bonavista has a subarctic climate (Köppen Dfc) due to the cold water surrounding the location, keeping mean June temperatures below 10 °C (50 °F). Although winters are relatively mild by Canadian standards, especially regarding extreme minima which are as much as 18 °C or 32.4 °F higher than at Grand Forks on a similar latitude with virtually the same annual mean temperature, there is heavy snowfall and frequent cold days. Winter lasts from December through April.

Bonavista is one of the windiest places in Canada with an average wind speed of 32.6 km/h (20.3 mph; 17.6 kn).

Climate data for Bonavista (1981–2010)
Month	Jan	Feb	Mar	Apr	May	Jun	Jul	Aug	Sep	Oct	Nov	Dec	Year
Record high humidex	17.5	13.1	13.0	24.0	26.9	32.9	36.2	37.0	33.0	27.9	21.9	15.7	37.0
Record high °C (°F)	14.9 (58.8)	11.8 (53.2)	13.4 (56.1)	21.5 (70.7)	25.6 (78.1)	28.8 (83.8)	30.6 (87.1)	30.1 (86.2)	26.1 (79.0)	22.8 (73.0)	17.8 (64.0)	14.4 (57.9)	30.6 (87.1)
Mean daily maximum °C (°F)	−1.3 (29.7)	−2.1 (28.2)	0.2 (32.4)	4.7 (40.5)	9.7 (49.5)	13.9 (57.0)	18.8 (65.8)	19.5 (67.1)	15.3 (59.5)	10.2 (50.4)	5.6 (42.1)	1.0 (33.8)	8.0 (46.4)
Daily mean °C (°F)	−4.8 (23.4)	−5.9 (21.4)	−3.1 (26.4)	1.5 (34.7)	5.7 (42.3)	9.5 (49.1)	14.4 (57.9)	15.5 (59.9)	11.9 (53.4)	7.3 (45.1)	2.8 (37.0)	−1.9 (28.6)	4.4 (39.9)
Mean daily minimum °C (°F)	−8.2 (17.2)	−9.5 (14.9)	−6.4 (20.5)	−1.8 (28.8)	1.6 (34.9)	5.1 (41.2)	10.0 (50.0)	11.5 (52.7)	8.4 (47.1)	4.4 (39.9)	0.0 (32.0)	−4.8 (23.4)	0.9 (33.6)
Record low °C (°F)	−24.4 (−11.9)	−24.7 (−12.5)	−24.3 (−11.7)	−13.6 (7.5)	−6.7 (19.9)	−2.8 (27.0)	−2.2 (28.0)	2.8 (37.0)	0.8 (33.4)	−3.3 (26.1)	−11.6 (11.1)	−22.2 (−8.0)	−24.7 (−12.5)
Record low wind chill	−37.0	−41.0	−42.0	−23.0	−16.0	−8.0	−7.0	0.0	0.0	−12.0	−23.0	−37.0	−42.0
Average precipitation mm (inches)	100.7 (3.96)	104.3 (4.11)	103.4 (4.07)	83.2 (3.28)	75.7 (2.98)	89.6 (3.53)	82.1 (3.23)	79.4 (3.13)	107.7 (4.24)	115.2 (4.54)	104.5 (4.11)	107.2 (4.22)	1,152.9 (45.39)
Average rainfall mm (inches)	34.7 (1.37)	42.8 (1.69)	53.1 (2.09)	59.8 (2.35)	68.7 (2.70)	89.0 (3.50)	82.1 (3.23)	79.4 (3.13)	107.7 (4.24)	111.2 (4.38)	81.0 (3.19)	54.3 (2.14)	863.8 (34.01)
Average snowfall cm (inches)	67.8 (26.7)	63.0 (24.8)	47.9 (18.9)	21.7 (8.5)	6.5 (2.6)	0.6 (0.2)	0.0 (0.0)	0.0 (0.0)	0.0 (0.0)	3.4 (1.3)	22.8 (9.0)	50.5 (19.9)	284.3 (111.9)
Average precipitation days (≥ 0.2 mm)	17.5	16.4	18.5	17.0	17.5	16.8	15.1	14.0	16.8	18.8	19.6	20.0	208.0
Average rainy days	7.1	7.1	10.3	12.5	16.4	17.0	15.1	14.0	16.8	18.1	15.5	10.7	160.6
Average snowy days (≥ 0.2 cm)	14.9	13.7	13.1	7.9	3.1	0.2	0.0	0.0	0.0	1.7	7.6	14.5	76.6
Average relative humidity (%)	77.5	77.0	77.4	78.2	74.4	75.5	72.9	71.7	74.7	75.8	77.9	79.7	76.1
Source: Environment and Climate Change Canada

== Attractions ==
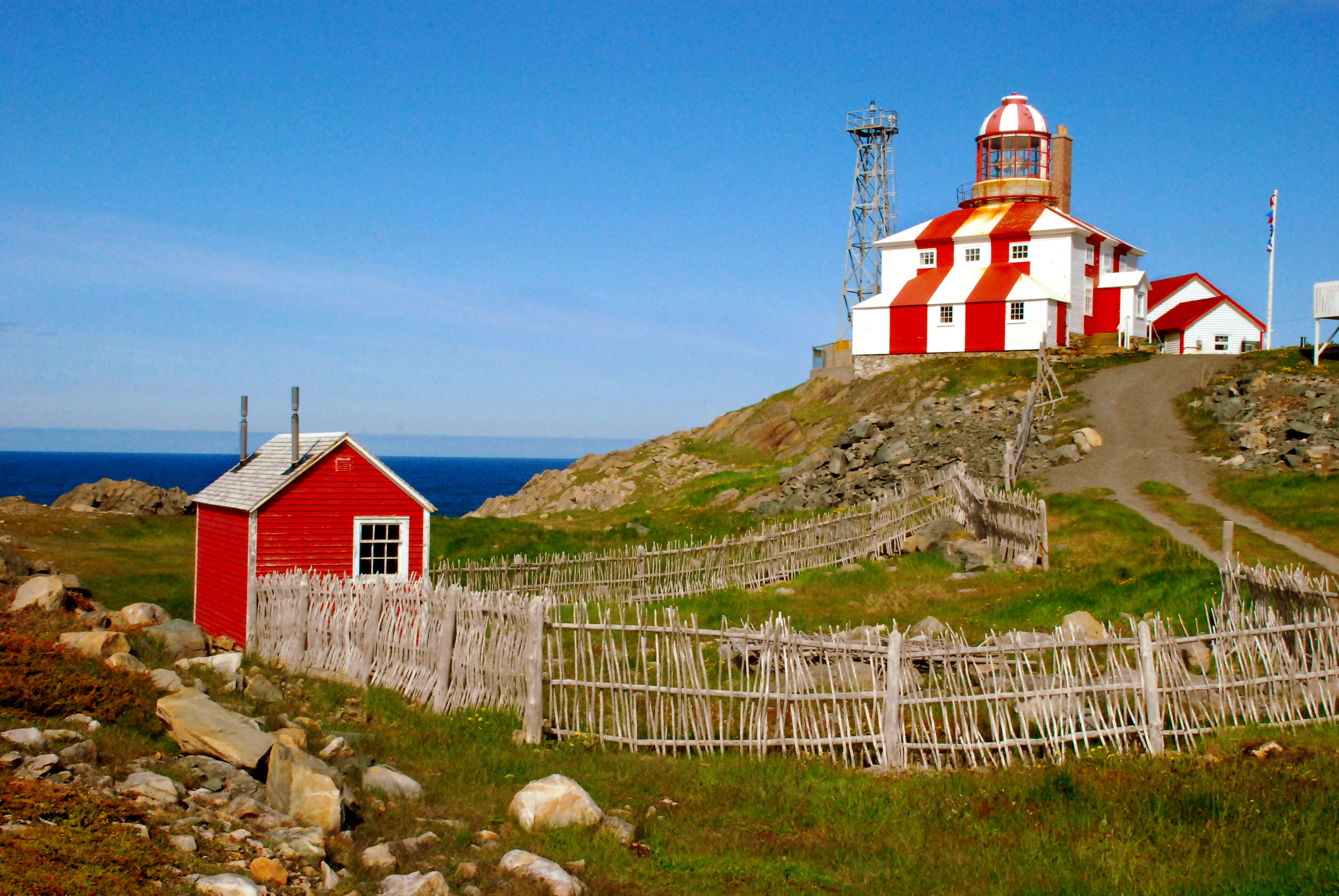
Bonavista lighthouse

- The Ryan Premises
- The Matthew Replica
- The Mockbeggar Plantation
- The Dungeon
- White Rock Murals
- Cape Bonavista Light
- Bonavista Loyal Orange Lodge
- Bonavista Archives
- Cabot Stadium
- Puffins, whales, and icebergs

== Notable people ==
- Adam Pardy, National Hockey League player
- Michael Ryder, National Hockey League player
- Rod Snow, professional rugby union player

== See also ==
- Upper Amherst Cove
- Heritage Foundation of Newfoundland and Labrador
- List of municipalities in Newfoundland and Labrador
