= Trinity, Newfoundland and Labrador =

Trinity
- Town
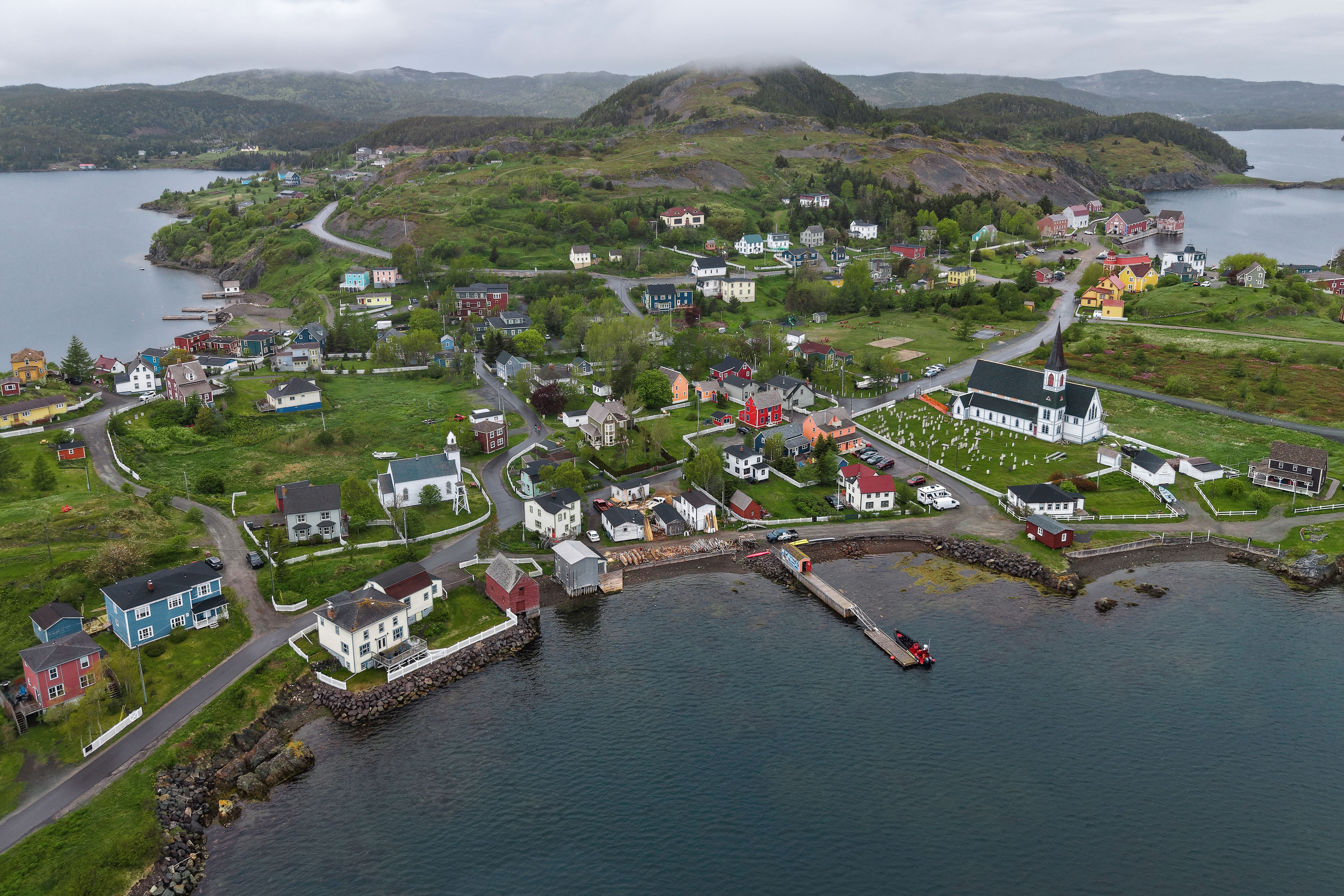
- Trinity, pictured in 2026

- Trinity in Newfoundland and Labrador
- Coordinates: 48°22′32″N 53°23′41″W
- Country: Canada
- Province: Newfoundland and Labrador
- Settled: 18th century

Government
  - Mayor: Christian Hayter

Area
  - Total: 12.92 km^{2} (4.99 sq mi)

Population (2021)
  - Total: 182
  - Density: 13.1/km^{2} (34/sq mi)
- Time zone: UTC-3:30 (Newfoundland Time)
  - Summer (DST): UTC-2:30 (Newfoundland Daylight)
- Area code: 709
- Highways: Route 239
- Website: https://townoftrinity.com/

Trinity is a small town located on Trinity Bay in Newfoundland and Labrador. The town contains a number of buildings recognized as Registered Heritage Structures by the Heritage Foundation of Newfoundland and Labrador.

== History ==
The harbour at Trinity was first used by fishing ships around the 16th century. The Portuguese explorer Gaspar Corte-Real named the location "Trinity" as he arrived on Trinity Sunday, 1501 although another account gives his arrival as 1500.

Fishermen from the West Country of England began using Trinity as a summer station in the migratory fishery in the 1570s. Summer fishermen continued to be primarily from the Channel Islands, especially Jersey, and Weymouth in Dorset until a permanent settlement was established. Trinity was settled by merchants from Poole, England during the 18th century, citing reasons such as the easily defensible harbour and abundance of shore space for fishing premises. Trinity was the site that Sir Richard Whitbourne held the first court of Admiralty in 1615, establishing the first court of justice in North America.

The merchant trade in Trinity was significant and dominated the social and economic life from Baie Verte to White Bay (Newfoundland and Labrador). At times, merchants in Trinity exported upwards of 30-40% of cod, train oil, and seals produced in Newfoundland. By the late 18th Century, the merchant firms in Trinity were operatoring 35 ocean-going ships, exporting 100,000 quintals of dried cod and supplying about 6,000 inhabitants.

A fort was established at Admiral's Point near Trinity in order to protect the assets of the merchants. Due to Trinity's prominence in the British-Newfoundland trade, it was attacked and twice captured by the French in the Anglo-French Wars of 1696–1713, first in 1696 and again in 1705. Both times, the properties of the residents were burnt. Trinity was again captured by the French during the Seven Years' War by Admiral de Ternay.

Trinity was the site of medical research, including the introduction of the smallpox vaccine to the new world in 1798 by John Clinch, a boyhood friend and medical colleague of Edward Jenner.

Religious activities in Trinity date back to the early years. The first parochial church was built in 1729 and Rev. Robert Kilpatrick, the first missionary of the Society for Propagation of the Gospel, arrived. During a tumultuous time in Trinity's history, a visiting Methodist preacher, John Hoskins, was tarred by sailors in 1780 - a resident Methodist preacher did not arrive until 1816. Construction on a new parish church began in 1820 and housed the Rev. Aubrey Spencer who later became the first Church of England bishop of the diocese of Newfoundland and Bermuda. In 1827, St. Paul's Church in Trinity was consecrated by Bishop Inglis of Nova Scotia. For this occasion, the hymn "We Love the Place, O Lord" was composed by Rev. William Bullock and has since gained widespread use.

The decline of Trinity began in the mid-19th century as major firms reduced their direct overseas trade and began to rely on commercial links with St. John's. The Ryan brothers of King's Cove and Bonavista continued their retail and general supply trade on the Lester-Garland Plantation until 1947.

The Trinity Record, a weekly newspaper, was in print in Trinity from 1886 to 1900.

Trinity was incorporated as a town in 1969.

On September 6, 1996 an F2 tornado touched down in the town, damaging homes and a shipyard building.

According to the 2016 Statistics Canada Census, the population of Trinity increased 23.4% from 2011 to 2016 and had 132 dwellings.

== Demographics ==
In the 2021 Census of Population conducted by Statistics Canada, Trinity had a population of 76 living in 36 of its 76 total private dwellings, a change of −55% from its 2016 population of 169. With a land area of 12.92 km^{2} (4.99 sq mi), it had a population density of 5.9/km^{2} (15.2/sq mi) in 2021.

Historical populations
Year	Pop.	±%
1951	344	—
1956	396	+15.1%
1961	362	−8.6%
1966	352	−2.8%
1971	288	−18.2%
1976	367	+27.4%
1981	375	+2.2%
1986	357	−4.8%
1991	326	−8.7%
1996	277	−15.0%
2001	240	−13.4%
2006	191	−20.4%
2011	137	−28.3%
2016	169	+23.4%
2021	182	+7.7%

== Arts and culture ==
Trinity is home to the Rising Tide Theatre Festival, founded by Artistic Director Donna Butt.

== Popular culture ==
Trinity was used as a filming location for the 2001 film The Shipping News and for the 2002 television miniseries Random Passage.

Trinity is the birthplace of Bob Fowler, an olympic runner who competed at the 1904 and 1906 olympic games. In 1909, Fowler set the world record for fastest time in a marathon, finishing in 2:52:45.4 at a race in Yonkers, New York.

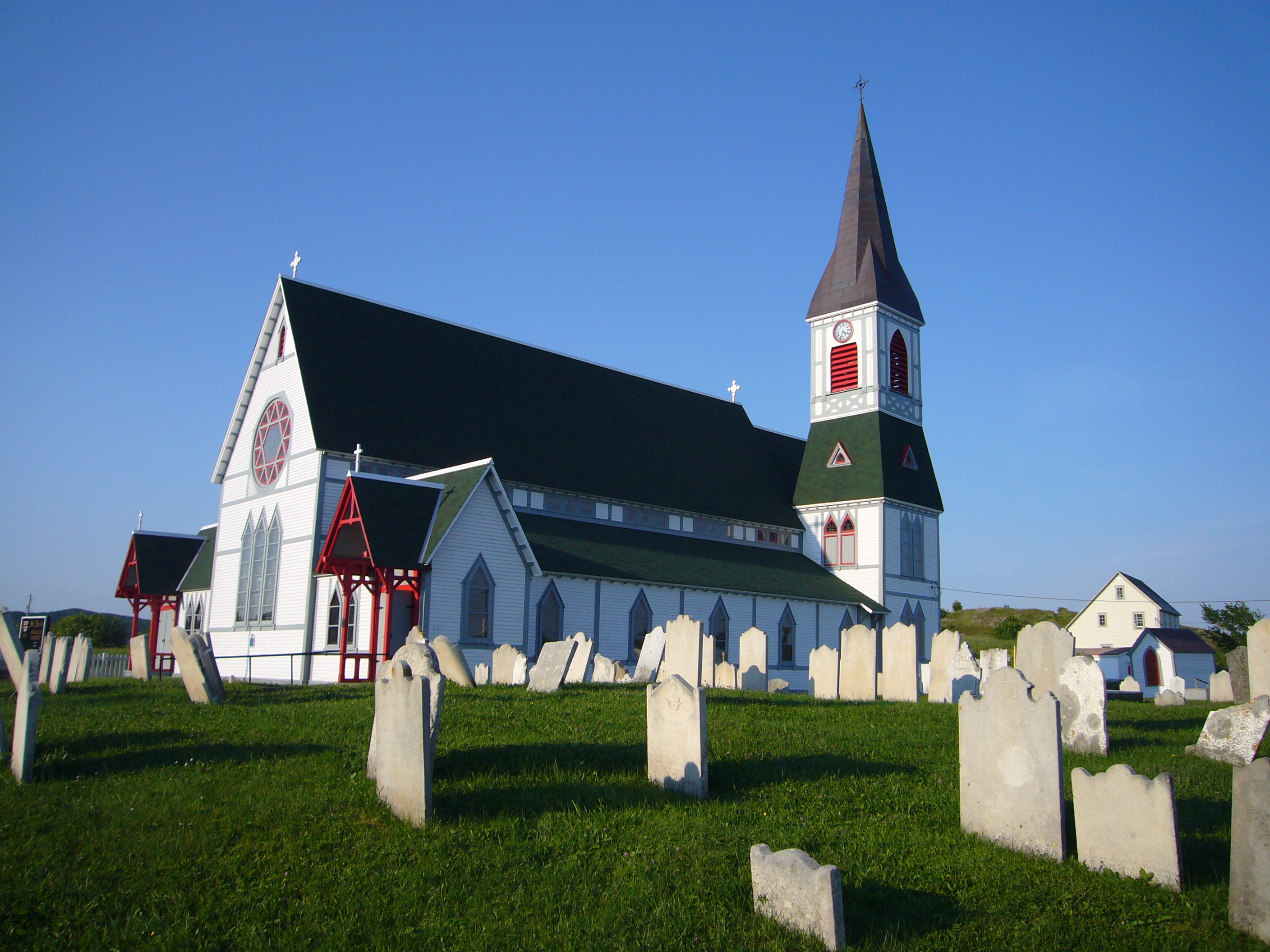
St. Paul's Anglican Church

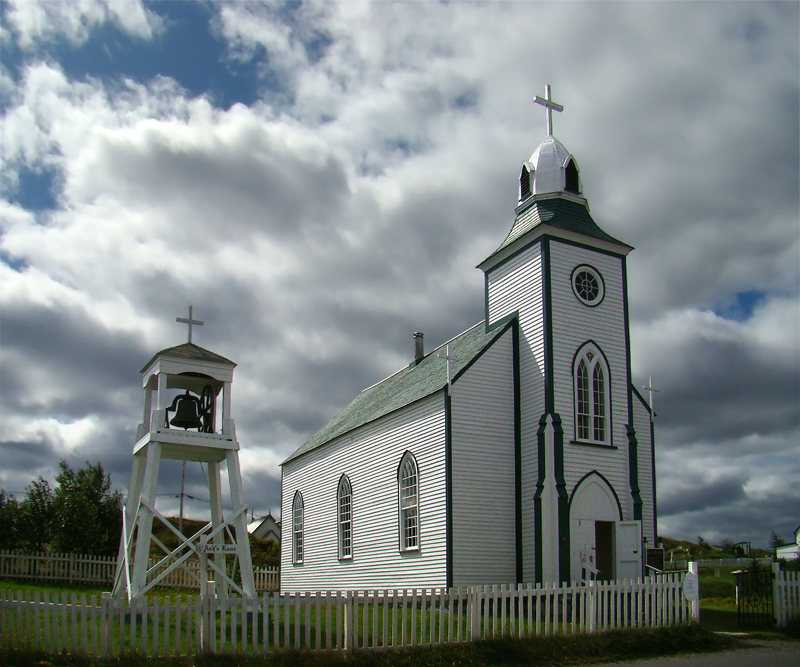
Church of the Most Holy Trinity

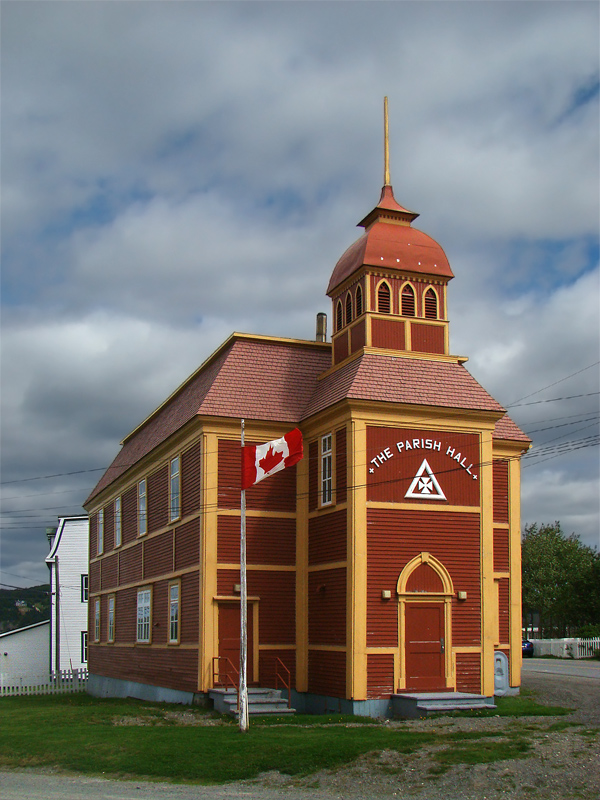
Parish Hall

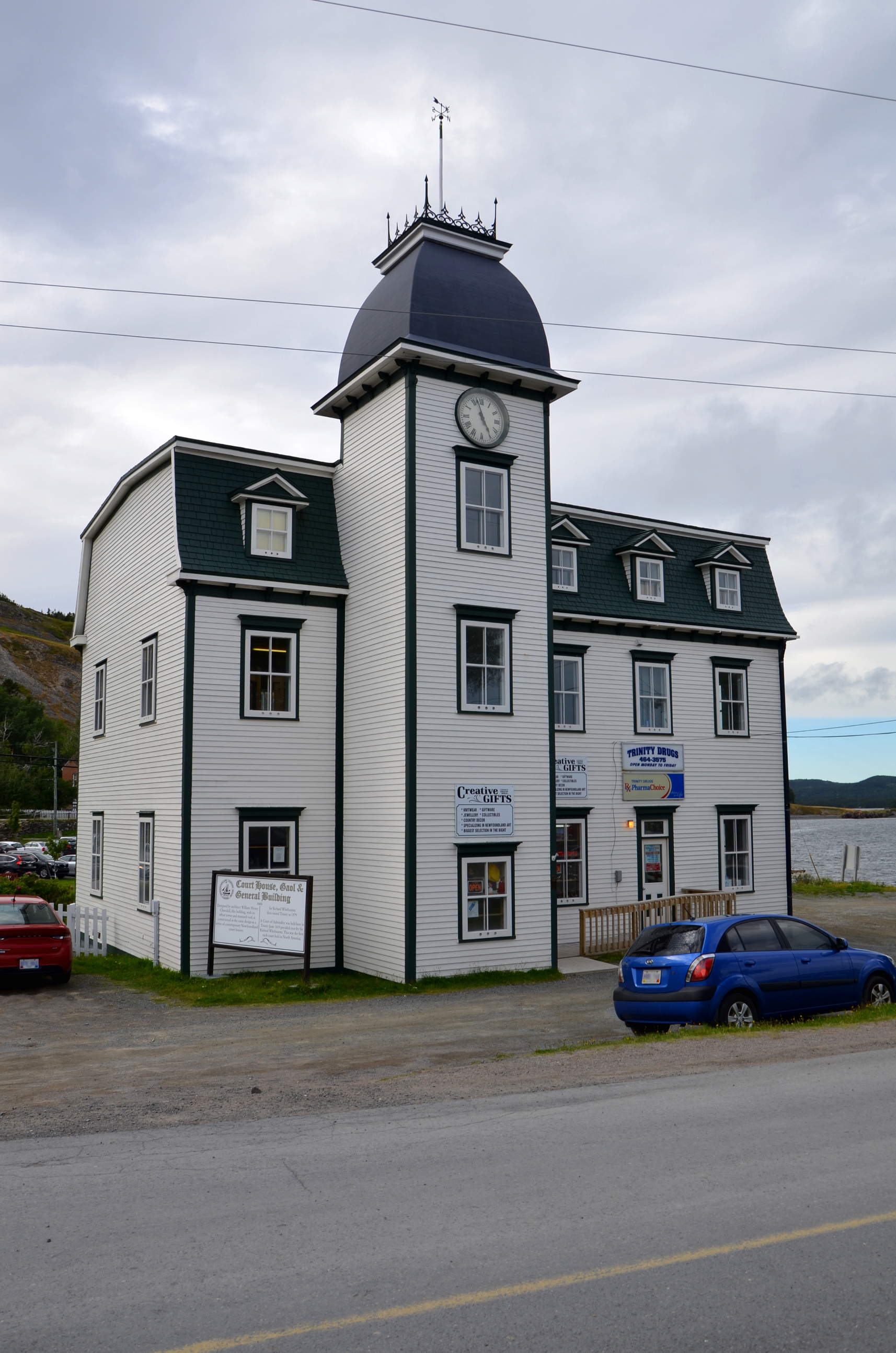
Courthouse, Gaol, General Building

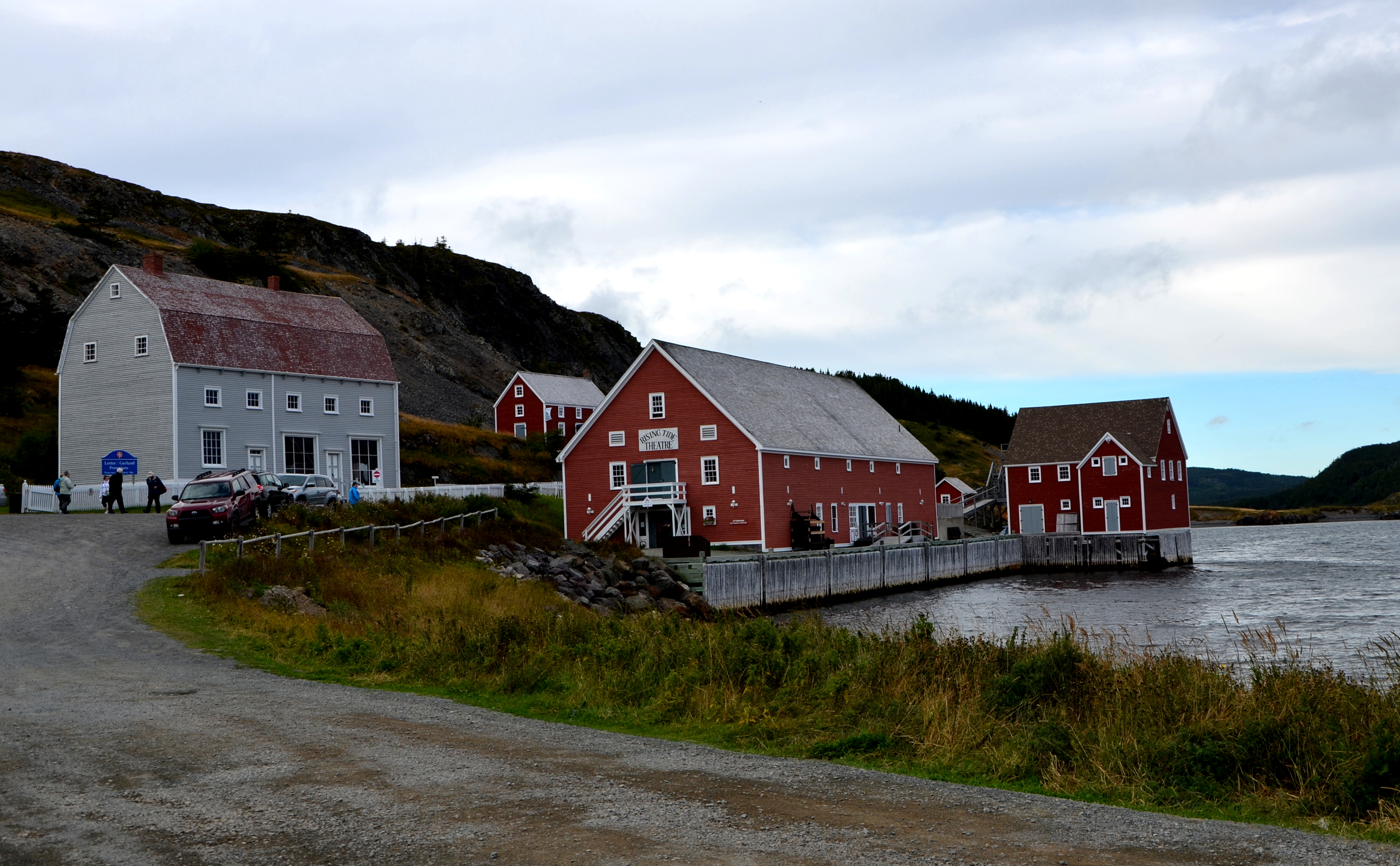
Lester-Garland Premises and the Rising Tide Theatre

== See also ==
- List of cities and towns in Newfoundland and Labrador
