= Catalina, Newfoundland and Labrador =

Catalina
- Community
- Location of Catalina in Newfoundland
- Coordinates: 48°30′54.32″N 53°04′38.87″W
- Country: Canada
- Province: Newfoundland and Labrador

Population (2006)
  - Total: 845
- Time zone: UTC-3:30 (Newfoundland Time)
  - Summer (DST): UTC-2:30 (Newfoundland Daylight)
- Area code: 709
- Highways: Route 230; Route 237

Catalina (/ˌkætəˈlaɪnə/ KAT-ə-LY-nə) is a community located on the eastern side of the Bonavista Peninsula, in the province of Newfoundland and Labrador, Canada. Catalina adjoins the union town of Port Union, the town built for and home to the Fisherman's Union Company established by Sir William Coaker.

The name of the town is purported by E.R. Seary to derive from the French Havre Sainte-Katherine which was later changed to the Spanish name Cataluna.

In 2005 Catalina was amalgamated with Little Catalina, Melrose and Port Union to form the town of Trinity Bay North.

== Transportation ==
Highway 230 (Discovery Trail/Cabot Street) and 237 (Church Street) are the main routes to and from Catalina.

== See also ==
- List of communities in Newfoundland and Labrador
