= Bonavista South =

Former provincial electoral district in Newfoundland and Labrador, Canada

Newfoundland and Labrador electoral district
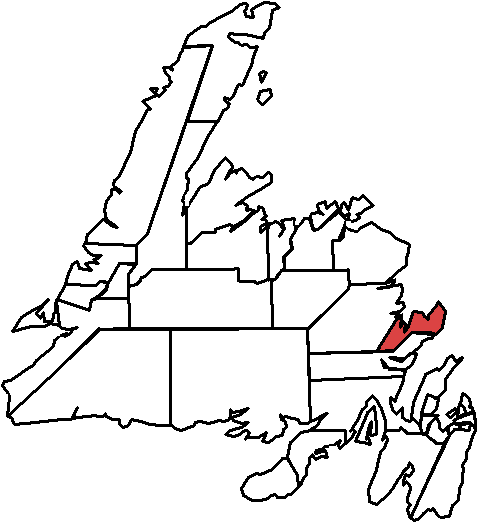
- Bonavista South in relation to other district in Newfoundland

Defunct provincial electoral district
- Legislature: Newfoundland and Labrador House of Assembly
- District created: 1959
- First contested: 1959
- Last contested: 2011

Demographics
- Population (2006): 10,014
- Electors (2011): 6,843

Bonavista South is a former provincial electoral district for the House of Assembly of Newfoundland and Labrador, Canada. In 2011 the district had 6,843 eligible voters.

It contains the communities of: Bonavista, Spillars Cove, Birchy Cove, Newman's Cove, Amherst Cove, Elliston, Little Catalina, Knights Cove, Stock Cove, King's Cove, Duntara, Keels, Open Hall, Redcliff, Tickle Cove, Plate Cove, Summerville, Princeton, Southern Bay, Charleston, Sweet Bay, Bloomfield, Musgravetown, Lethbridge, Brooklyn, Portland, Jamestown, Winterbrook, Catalina, Port Union, and Melrose.

The district was heavily dependent on the fishery, but agriculture and tourism were also significant to the local economy.

The district was abolished in 2015 and largely replaced by the new district of Bonavista.

== Members of the House of Assembly ==
The district has elected the following members of the House of Assembly:

Assembly	Years	Member	Party
29th	1949–1951	Ted Russell	Liberal
30th	1951–1956	Clyde Brown	Liberal
31st	1956–1959	Uriah Strickland	Liberal
32nd	1959–1962	Rossy Barbour	Liberal
33rd	1962–1966	Rossy Barbour	Liberal
34th	1966–1971	Rossy Barbour	Liberal
35th	1971–1972	Jim Morgan	Progressive Conservative
36th	1972–1975	Jim Morgan	Progressive Conservative
37th	1975–1979	Jim Morgan	Progressive Conservative
38th	1979–1982	Jim Morgan	Progressive Conservative
39th	1982–1985	Jim Morgan	Progressive Conservative
40th	1985–1989	Jim Morgan	Progressive Conservative
41st	1989–1993	Aubrey Gover	Liberal
42nd	1993–1996	Roger Fitzgerald	Progressive Conservative
43rd	1996–1999	Roger Fitzgerald	Progressive Conservative
43rd	1999–2003	Roger Fitzgerald	Progressive Conservative
44th	2003–2007	Roger Fitzgerald	Progressive Conservative
45th	2007–2011	Roger Fitzgerald	Progressive Conservative
46th	2011–2015	Glen Little	Progressive Conservative

== Election results ==
2011 Newfoundland and Labrador general election
Party	Candidate	Votes	%
Progressive Conservative	Glen Little	2,214	56.14
New Democratic	Darryl Johnson	1,198	30.38
Liberal	Johanna Ryan Guy	532	13.49
Total valid votes		3,944	99.74
Total rejected ballots		10	0.26
Turnout		3,954	57.95
Electors on the lists		6,823	–

2007 Newfoundland and Labrador general election
Party	Candidate	Votes	%	±%
Progressive Conservative	Roger Fitzgerald	Acclaimed	100.00%	+20.24%
Liberal	~~Clayton Hobbs~~	Withdrew	0.00%	-17.14%

2003 Newfoundland and Labrador general election
Party	Candidate	Votes	%	±%
Progressive Conservative	Roger Fitzgerald	4,354	79.58%	–
Liberal	Betty Fitzgerald	938	17.14%	
NDP	Sam Kelly	179	3.27%	

1999 Newfoundland and Labrador general election
Party	Candidate	Votes	%	±%
Progressive Conservative	Roger Fitzgerald	4,496	70.87	
Liberal	George Clements	1,768	27.87	
NDP	Shawn Crann	80	1.26	

1996 Newfoundland and Labrador general election
Party	Candidate	Votes	%	±%
Progressive Conservative	Roger Fitzgerald	4,781	–	–
Liberal	Kay Young	2,474		

1993 Newfoundland and Labrador general election
Party	Candidate	Votes	%	±%
Progressive Conservative	Roger Fitzgerald	2,613	–	–
Liberal	Aubrey Gover	2,235		
NDP	Malon Quinton	147		

1989 Newfoundland and Labrador general election
Party	Candidate	Votes	%	±%
Liberal	Aubrey Gover	1952		
Progressive Conservative	Roger Fitzgerald	1932	–	–
NDP	Rex Sheppard	259		

1985 Newfoundland and Labrador general election
Party	Candidate	Votes	%	±%
Progressive Conservative	James Morgan	2424	–	–
Liberal	Ancel John Johnson	1193		
NDP	Harry Clarence Faulkner	519		

1982 Newfoundland and Labrador general election
Party	Candidate	Votes	%	±%
Progressive Conservative	James Morgan	2742	–	–
Liberal	Cyril Roy Mifflin	992		

== See also ==
- List of Newfoundland and Labrador provincial electoral districts
- Canadian provincial electoral districts
