= Newfoundland and Labrador Route 235 =

Highway in Newfoundland and Labrador, Canada

Route 235
- Bonavista Bay Highway

Route information
- Maintained by Newfoundland and Labrador Department of Transportation and Infrastructure
- Length: 73.2 km (45.5 mi)

Major junctions
- South end: Route 230 at Southern Bay
- Route 236 in Stock Cove; Route 237 in Amherst Cove; Route 230 in Bonavista
- North end: Cape Bonavista Light

Location
- Country: Canada
- Province: Newfoundland and Labrador

Highway system
- Highways in Newfoundland and Labrador
← Route 234	→ Route 236

Route 235, commonly called the Cabot Highway branches off from Route 230 at Southern Bay. Both Route 230 and Route 235 head towards Bonavista, Route 230 crossing the Bonavista Peninsula at this point to service towns on the Trinity Bay side of the Peninsula whilst Route 235 stays on the Bonavista Bay side of the Peninsula, going all the way to Cape Bonavista.

== Route description ==
Route 235 begins in Southern Bay at an intersection with Route 230 (Cabot Highway/Discovery Trail). It heads northeast along the coastline of Bonavista Bay to pass through Princeton, Summerville, Plate Cove West, and Plate Cove East. The highway now heads more inland and eastward through rural areas, where it meets a local road leading to Open Hall, Red Cliffe, and Tickle Cove. Route 235 rejoins the coast at King's Cove, where it meets a local road leading to Duntara and Keels. It winds its way eastward to pass through Stock Cove, where it has an intersection with Route 236 (Stock Cove Road), Knight's Cove, Hodderville, and Amherst Cove, where it has an intersection with Route 237 (Blackhead Bay Road). The highway now passes through Newman's Cove and Birchy Cove before entering the Bonavista town limits along John Cabot Drive. It heads north through neighbourhoods before passing through downtown and by the town's harbour, where it has another intersection Route 230 (Confederation Drive). Route 235 becomes Cape Shore Road and passes through more neighbourhoods before leaving Bonavista and passing by Dungeon Provincial Park. The highway now heads through rural plains to the very tip of the Bonavista Peninsula at Cape Bonavista, where Route 235 comes to a dead end at the Cape Bonavista Lighthouse.

== Major intersections ==
Location	km	mi	Destinations	Notes
Southern Bay	0.0	0.0	Route 230 to Route 1 (TCH) – Bonavista, Lethbridge, Clarenville	Southern terminus, Route 230 Continues Through Lethbridge, To Thorburn Lake
Summerville	8.3	5.2	Harbour View Drive	Route 235-13
	22.0	13.7	Main Road - Open Hall-Red Cliffe, Tickle Cove	Route 235-17
King's Cove	31.7	19.7	Top Road - Duntara, Keels	Route 235-20
Stock Cove	35.4	22.0	Route 236 south (Park Road) – Port Rexton	Northern terminus of Route 236; provides access to Lockston Path Provincial Park
Amherst Cove	47.1	29.3	Route 237 east (Blackhead Bay Road) – Catalina, Port Union	Western terminus of Route 237
Amherst Cove	49.0	30.4	Main Road - Upper Amherst Cove	
Bonavista	64.1	39.8	Route 230 south (Confederation Drive/Discovery Trail) to Route 1 (TCH) – Catalina, Port Rexton, Clarenville	Northern terminus of Route 230, Serves Lethbridge And Clarenville Via Trinity Bay North
	66.8	41.5	Dungeon Provincial Park northern entrance	Access road into park
Cape Bonavista	73.2	45.5	Terminates at Cape Bonavista Lighthouse	Northern terminus
1.000 mi = 1.609 km; 1.000 km = 0.621 mi

== Attractions along Route 235 ==
- Dungeon Provincial Park
- Cape Bonavista Lighthouse
