= Newfoundland and Labrador Route 237 =

Highway in Newfoundland and Labrador, Canada

Coordinates: 48.53501°N 53.14650°W

Route 237
- Kings Cove Road

Route information
- Maintained by Newfoundland and Labrador Department of Transportation and Infrastructure
- Length: 10 km (6.2 mi)

Major junctions
- East end: Route 230 in Catalina
- West end: Route 235 south of Amherst Cove

Location
- Country: Canada
- Province: Newfoundland and Labrador

Highway system
- Highways in Newfoundland and Labrador
| ← Route 236 | → Route 238 |

Route 237 is a bypass road linking Catalina, Trinity Bay (situated on Route 230) with Newman's Cove, Bonavista Bay (situated on Route 235). It is referred to as Kings Cove Road

There are no other communities along this highway, no other highways intersect it beyond the Routes 230 and 235. Within Catalina the highway is connected with local streets (Bond Street, Guys Lane, Harts Road). The entire length of the roadway is paved with single lane in either direction.

== Major intersections ==
| Location | km | mi | Destinations | Notes |
|---|---|---|---|---|
| Amherst Cove | 0.0 | 0.0 | Route 235 (Bonavista Bay Highway) – Summerville, King's Cove, Newman's Cove, Bonavista | Western terminus |
| Catalina | 10 | 6.2 | Route 230 (Bonavista Peninsula Highway/Discovery Trail) to Route 1 (TCH) – Bonavista, Port Union, Clarenville | Eastern terminus |
1.000 mi = 1.609 km; 1.000 km = 0.621 mi
