= Bonavista (electoral district) =

Provincial electoral district in Newfoundland and Labrador, Canada

Newfoundland and Labrador electoral district

Provincial electoral district
- Legislature: Newfoundland and Labrador House of Assembly
MHA
Craig Pardy
Progressive Conservative
- District created: 2015
- First contested: 2015
- Last contested: 2025

Demographics
- Population (2011): 12,591
- Electors (2015): 9,203
- Area (km²): 2,175
- Census division: Division No. 7
- Census subdivision(s): Bonavista, Duntara, Elliston, Keels, King's Cove, Musgravetown, Port Rexton, Trinity, Trinity Bay North

Bonavista is a provincial electoral district in Newfoundland and Labrador, Canada, which is represented by one member in the Newfoundland and Labrador House of Assembly. It was contested for the first time in the 2015 provincial election.

Prior to the district's creation in 2015, the area was largely represented by the district of Bonavista South.

== Members of the House of Assembly ==
The district has elected the following members of the House of Assembly:

Assembly	Years	Member	Party
48th	2015–2019	Neil King	Liberal
49th	2019–2021	Craig Pardy	Progressive Conservative
50th	2021–2025	Craig Pardy	Progressive Conservative
51st	2025–Present	Craig Pardy	Progressive Conservative

== Election results ==
Graph of election results (minor parties that never got 2% of the vote or did not run consistently are omitted) View source data.

2025 Newfoundland and Labrador general election
Party	Candidate	Votes	%	±%
Progressive Conservative	Craig Pardy	3,260	71.65	+14.32
Liberal	Heather Matthews	1,037	22.79	-2.77
New Democratic	David Ellis	253	5.56	+3.66
Total valid votes		4,550		
Total rejected ballots				
Turnout				
Eligible voters				
Progressive Conservative hold		Swing		+8.55

2021 Newfoundland and Labrador general election
Party	Candidate	Votes	%	±%
Progressive Conservative	Craig Pardy	2,117	57.32	+6.89
Liberal	Christine Gill	944	25.56	-24.00
Independent	Neil King	562	15.22	
New Democratic	Timothy Whey	70	1.90	
Total valid votes		3,693	99.49	
Total rejected ballots		19	0.51	
Turnout		3,712	40.48	
Eligible voters		9,169		
Progressive Conservative hold		Swing		+15.45
Source(s) "Officially Nominated Candidates General Election 2021" (PDF). Elections Newfoundland and Labrador. "NL Election 2021 (Unofficial Results)".

2019 Newfoundland and Labrador general election
Party	Candidate	Votes	%	±%
Progressive Conservative	Craig Pardy	2,611	50.43	+23.51
Liberal	Neil King	2,566	49.57	-16.45
Total valid votes		5,177	99.33	
Total rejected ballots		35	0.67	+0.09
Turnout		5,212	59.36	+1.28
Eligible voters		8,781		
Progressive Conservative gain from Liberal		Swing		+19.98

2015 Newfoundland and Labrador general election
Party	Candidate	Votes	%	±%
Liberal	Neil King	3,508	66.01	–
Progressive Conservative	Glen Little	1,431	26.93	–
Independent	Johanna Ryan Guy	259	4.88	–
New Democratic	Adrian Power	116	2.18	–
Total valid votes		5,314	99.42	–
Total rejected ballots		31	0.58	–
Turnout		5,345	58.08	–
Eligible voters		9,203		
Liberal notional gain from Progressive Conservative		Swing		–
Source: Elections Newfoundland and Labrador

== See also ==
- List of Newfoundland and Labrador provincial electoral districts
- Canadian provincial electoral districts
