= Newfoundland and Labrador Route 236 =

Highway in Newfoundland and Labrador, Canada

Coordinates: 48.46988°N 53.34916°W

Route 236
- Stock Cove Road

Route information
- Maintained by Newfoundland and Labrador Department of Transportation and Infrastructure
- Length: 17.0 km (10.6 mi)

Major junctions
- South end: Route 230 at Port Rexton
- North end: Route 235 in Stock Cove

Location
- Country: Canada
- Province: Newfoundland and Labrador

Highway system
- Highways in Newfoundland and Labrador
← Route 235	→ Route 237

Route 236 is a bypass road linking Port Rexton, Trinity Bay (situated on Route 230) with King's Cove and nearby towns on Bonavista Bay (situated on Route 235). It runs north–south across between the two towns.

There are no other communities along this highway and no other highways intersect it.

== Major intersections ==
Location	km	mi	Destinations	Notes
Port Rexton	0.0	0.0	Route 230 (Bonavista Peninsula Highway/Discovery Trail) to Route 1 (TCH) – Clarenville, Catalina, Bonavista	Southern terminus
Stock Cove	17.0	10.6	Route 235 (Bonavista Bay Highway) – King's Cove, Summerville, Bonavista	Northern terminus
1.000 mi = 1.609 km; 1.000 km = 0.621 mi

== Attractions along Route 236 ==
- Lockston Path Provincial Park
