= Clyde Brown =

Canadian politician

MHA for Bonavista South
- In office 1951–1956
- Preceded by: Ted Russell
- Succeeded by: Uriah Strickland

Personal details
- Born: November 26, 1926 King's Cove, Dominion of Newfoundland
- Died: October 18, 1965 (aged 38) Ottawa, Ontario, Canada
- Party: Liberal Party of Newfoundland and Labrador

Clyde Scammell Brown (November 26, 1926 – October 18, 1965) was a Canadian politician. He represented the electoral district of Bonavista South in the Newfoundland and Labrador House of Assembly from 1951 to 1956. He is a member of the Liberal Party of Newfoundland and Labrador. He was born at King's Cove, Newfoundland. He died at an Ottawa hospital in 1965.
