= Dungeon Provincial Park =

Provincial park in Newfoundland and Labrador, Canada

- IUCN category III (natural monument or feature)
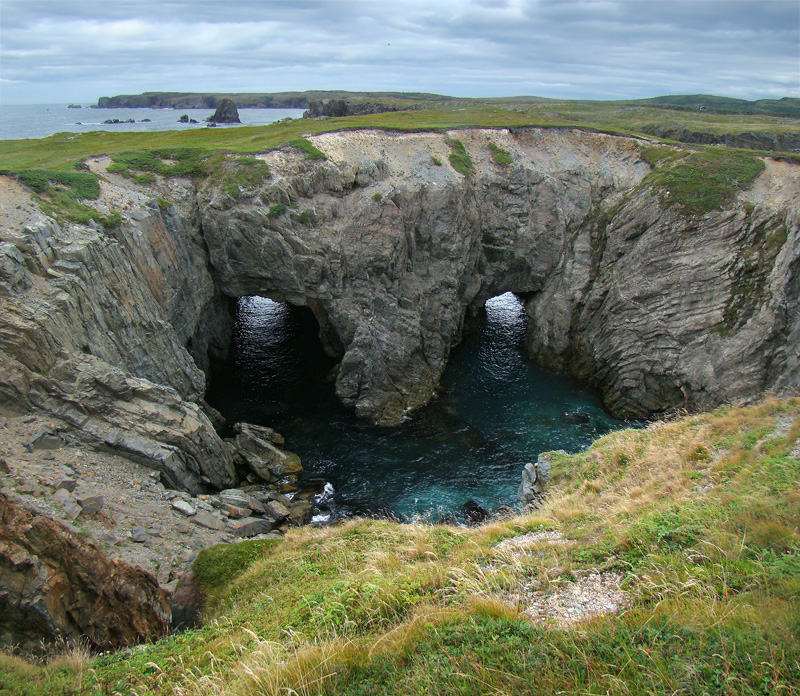
- "The Dungeon", a collapsed sea cave.

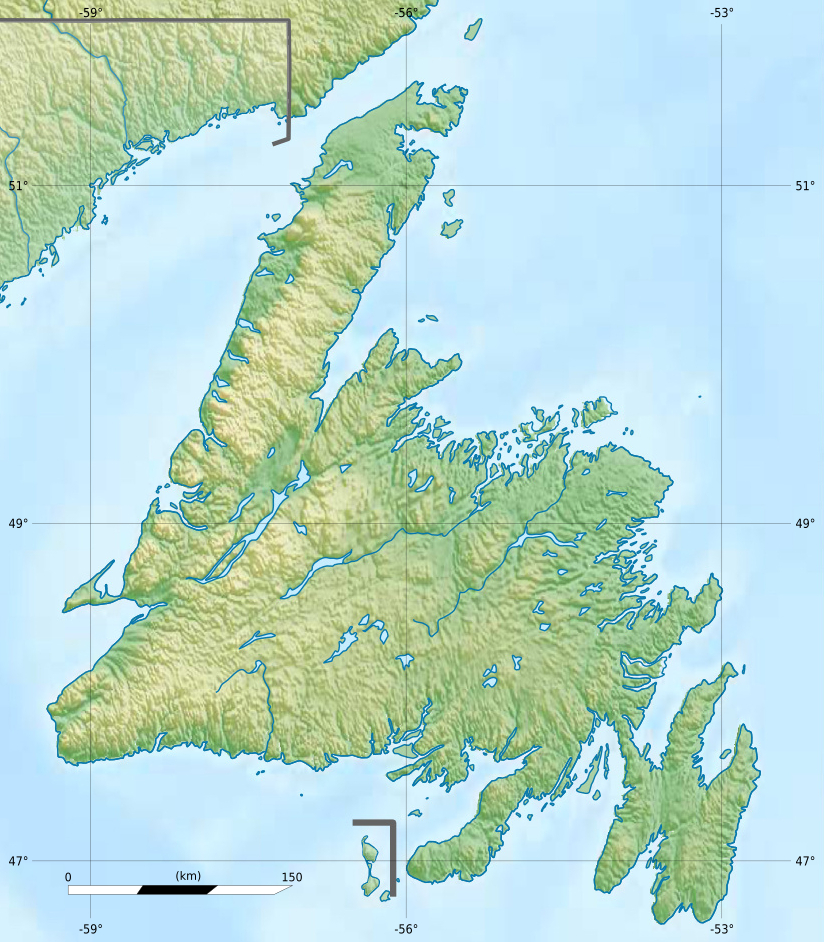
- Location within Canada Location within Newfoundland
- Interactive map of Dungeon Provincial Park
- Location: Newfoundland and Labrador
- Nearest city: Bonavista, Newfoundland and Labrador
- Coordinates: 48°40′0″N 53°5′2″W
- Area: .02 km^{2} (0.0077 sq mi)
- Established: 1983
- Governing body: ParksNL

Dungeon Provincial Park is a day-use provincial park located on the Bonavista Peninsula in Newfoundland and Labrador, Canada. The park forms part of the Discovery Geopark, a UNESCO Global Geopark. The park is administered by the Parks Division of Newfoundland and Labrador.

== Description ==
The park is centered on "the Dungeon" a collapsed sea cave, or gloup, now forming a natural bridge with an opening more than 300 feet (91 m) in diameter. The cave rock consists of sandstones and siltstones of the Musgravetown Group. The site sits on Cape Bonavista, south of the Cape Bonavista Light. The park features viewing platforms around the cave, hiking trails, and picnic areas. The park consists of 0.02 square kilometres (4.9 acres). in total.

The Geological Association of Canada’s Newfoundland and Labrador Section has identified the Dungeon as “sea-stacks in the process of formation.”

== History ==
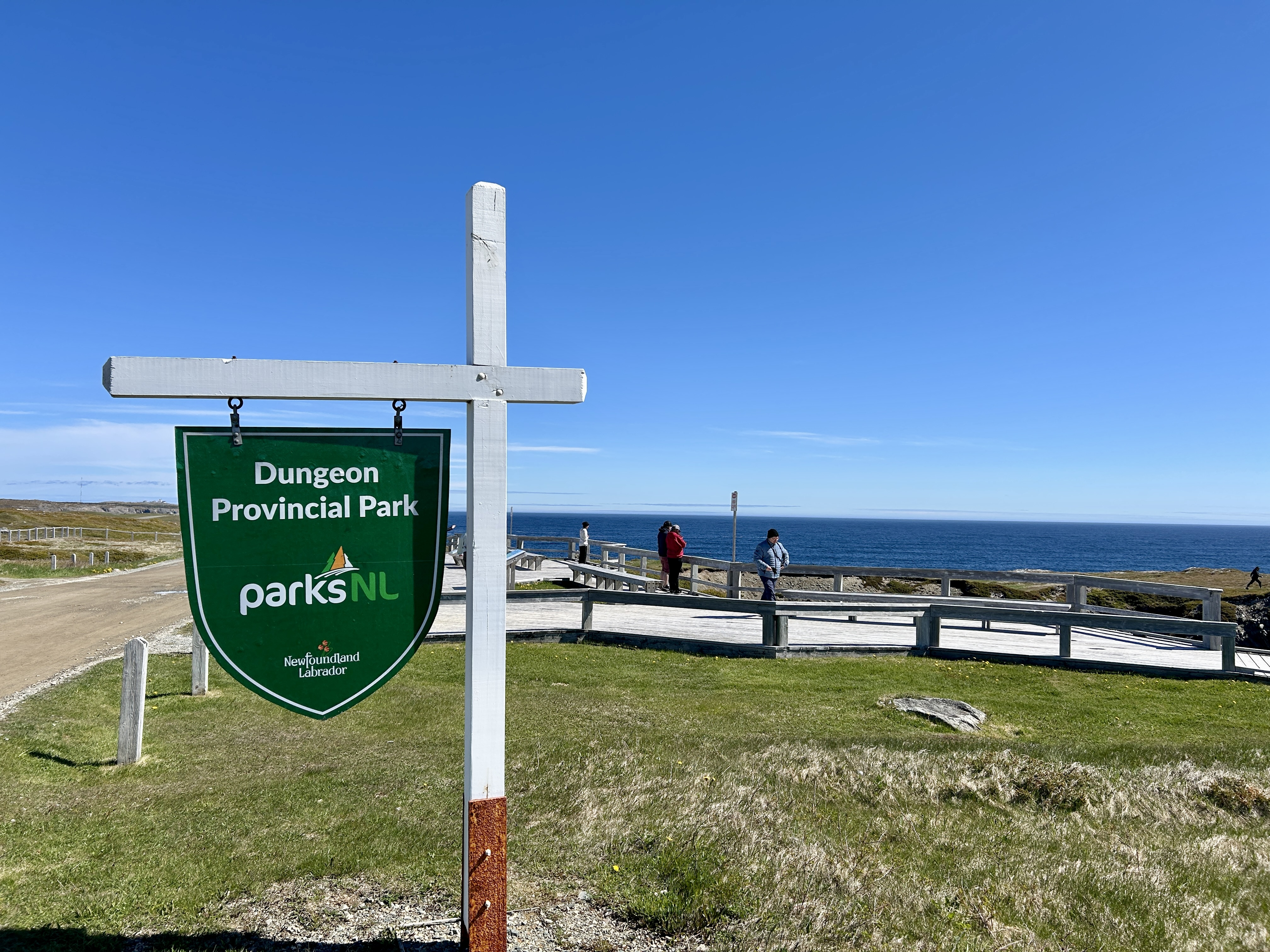
Park Sign at Dungeon Provincial Park

The park was established in 1983 by the Dungeon Park Proclamation, an order in council issued under the authority of Newfoundland and Labrador's Provincial Parks Act. A 1996 order in council repealed the original and redefined the boundaries of the park out of the existing Crown land and private property.

In 2016, the St. John’s-based magazine Downhome selected the Dungeon as one of the "Seven Wonders of Newfoundland & Labrador."

In 2017, MP and Minister of Public Services and Procurement Judy Foote announced funding through the Atlantic Canada Opportunities Agency that would go towards enhancing the Dungeon and other "sites with geological and cultural significance" on the Bonavista Peninsula.

The view from Dungeon Provincial Park of Cape Bonavista was used by the Bank of Canada in the design of a commemorative $10 bill celebrating 2017's 150th anniversary of Canadian Confederation.

In July 2020, Discovery Geopark gained recognition from UNESCO as a Geopark, with the recognized site including Dungeon Provincial Park.

== In popular culture ==
In 2019, artist Camille Turner’s art installation at the Bonavista Biennale festival featured footage of the park.

Scenes from Disney's 2023 film Peter Pan & Wendy were filmed at Dungeon Provincial Park.

== See also ==
- List of protected areas of Newfoundland and Labrador
