= New Democratic Party candidates in the 2008 Canadian federal election =

This is a list of nominated candidates for the New Democratic Party in the 40th Canadian federal election, which resulted in a Conservative minority government.

== Newfoundland and Labrador – 7 seats ==
Riding	Candidate	Gender	Residence	Occupation	Votes	%	Rank	Biographical notes	Ref.
Avalon	Randy Wayne Dawe	M	Clark's Beach	Truck driver	5,707	17.4	3rd	Dawe ran in the riding of Bonavista—Trinity—Conception in both the 1997 and 2000 federal elections. In 1997, he was the Progressive Conservative Party of Canada candidate and in 2000 he ran for the Canadian Alliance.	
Bonavista—Gander—Grand Falls—Windsor	Jason Holley	M	Amherst Cove	Artist	3,577	12.5	3rd	Holley is an artist and small business owner from Amherst Cove.	
Humber—St. Barbe—Baie Verte	Mark Kennedy	M	Corner Brook	Engineering Technician	4,603	17.5	2nd		
Labrador	Phyllis Artiss	F	St. John's	Retired University Professor	1,378	17.8	2nd	Artiss was a parachute candidate from St. John's. She is a retired Memorial University professor.	
Random—Burin—St. George's	Terry White	M	Stephenville	Carpenter	5,563	23.8	2nd	White has lived in Stephenville since 1982, and recently came out of retirement to work as a carpenter in Alberta.	
St. John's East	Jack Harris	M	St. John's	Lawyer	30,881	74.6	1st	Former federal MP for this riding (1987–1988) and leader of the Newfoundland and Labrador New Democratic Party.	
St. John's South—Mount Pearl	Ryan Cleary	M	St. John's	Journalist	13,971	40.6	2nd	Cleary is the former editor of the weekly Independent newspaper in St. John's	

== Prince Edward Island – 4 seats ==
Riding	Candidate	Gender	Residence	Occupation	Votes	%	Rank	Biographical notes	Ref.
Cardigan	Mike Avery	M	Millview	Maintenance Worker #3	1,556	8.1	3rd		
Charlottetown	Brian Pollard	M	Charlottetown	Filmmaker	2,187	12.3	3rd	He was the candidate in 2006.	
Egmont	Orville Lewis	M	Woodstock	Farmer	1,670	9.0	3rd		
Malpeque	J'Nan Brown	F	Clyde River	Retired	1,819	9.7	3rd		

== Nova Scotia – 11 seats ==
Riding	Candidate	Gender	Residence	Occupation	Votes	%	Rank	Biographical notes	Ref.
Cape Breton—Canso	Mark MacNeill	M	Inverness	Government and Business Policy Advisor	7,660	21.1	3rd	Served in Ottawa as a consultant with National Advisory Board on Science and Technology, with the Treasury Board Secretariat and the Solicitor General's Aboriginal Policing Secretariat.	
Central Nova	Mary Louise Lorefice	F	Antigonish	Retired educator	7,659	19.6	3rd	Lorefice is a retired teacher from Antigonish, who has lived in the community for 38 years.	
Cumberland—Colchester—Musquodoboit Valley	Karen Olsson	F	North River	Stay-at-home Mother	4,874	12.3	2nd		
Dartmouth—Cole Harbour	Brad Pye	M	Ottawa, ON	Senior Political Party Program Officer	12,793	31.5	2nd	Pye is an international development worker and son of former Dartmouth North MLA Jerry Pye.	
Halifax	Megan Leslie	F	Halifax	Community Legal Worker	19,252	42.7	1st		
Halifax West	Tamara Lorincz	F	Halifax	Director of Nova Scotia Environment Network	12,201	29.6	2nd	An environmentalist.	
Kings—Hants	Carol E. Harris	F	Wolfville	University Professor	8,291	22.0	3rd	She was the NDP's candidate in the 2000 election in Esquimalt—Juan de Fuca.	
Sackville—Eastern Shore	Peter Stoffer	M	Windsor Junction	Parliamentarian	24,279	61.4	1st	Stoffer has been the incumbent MP since 1997.	
South Shore—St. Margaret's	Gordon S. Earle	M	Upper Tantallon	Retired Public Servant	13,456	33.7	2nd	Earle is the former federal MP for Halifax West (1997–2000). Has run in this riding unsuccessfully in 2004 and 2006.	
Sydney—Victoria	Wayne McKay	M	Sydney	Teacher	8,559	24.4	2nd		
West Nova	George Barron	M	Bear River	Paramedic	7,097	16.9	3rd	Barron was born near Paris, Ontario, he has been a paramedic for 22 years. He was nominated on October 28, 2007.	

== New Brunswick – 10 seats ==
Riding	Candidate	Gender	Residence	Occupation	Votes	%	Rank	Biographical notes	Ref.
Acadie—Bathurst	Yvon Godin	M	Bathurst	Parliamentarian	25,849	57.5	1st	Incumbent MP since 1997.	
Beauséjour	Chris Durrant	M	Sackville	Student	7,242	16.9	3rd	Durrant is pursuing an honours degree in international relations at Mount Allison University. He was born in Lennoxville, Quebec.	
Fredericton	Jesse Travis	M	Rusagonis	Software Sales Consultant	6,490	15.4	3rd		
Fundy Royal	Rob Moir	M	Clifton Royal	Professor	7,907	23.7	2nd	Moir is an economist and educator; President of the Atlantic Canada Economics Association. He was the candidate in the 2006 election.	
Madawaska—Restigouche	Thérèse Tremblay-Philippe	F	Dalhousie	Library – assistant	5,361	15.6	3rd		
Miramichi	Donald A. Doucet	M	Lagacéville	Small Business Owner	4,904	17.1	3rd	Doucet co-owns two small businesses in the Neguac, New Brunswick area, where he was born. He is a former pulp mill worker and trucker. He ran in the 1999 New Brunswick general election.	
Moncton—Riverview—Dieppe	Carl Bainbridge	M	Moncton	Driver Contractor	7,394	16.3	3rd	Went on to be an active member in the populist People's Alliance of New Brunswick and was their candidate in Moncton North in the 2010 New Brunswick general election and a candidate for mayor of Moncton in 2012 New Brunswick municipal elections.	
New Brunswick Southwest	Andrew Graham	M	Saint John	Woodworker – Carpenter	4,958	16.5	3rd	Graham is a carpenter and woodworker. He also designs and builds harpsichords and pipe organs. He was born in London, Ontario and was educated at the New Brunswick College of Craft and Design. Ran for the NDP in the 2006 election finishing third with 5,178 votes or 15.63%. He also ran for the NDP in the 1999 and 2003 elections in Western Charlotte.	
Saint John	Tony Mowery	M	Saint John	Substitute Teacher	5,560	16.0	3rd		
Tobique—Mactaquac	Alice Finnamore	F	Scotch Settlement	Psychologist	4,830	15.3	3rd	Ran for the NDP in the 2006 election finishing third with 4,172 votes or 11.49%.	

== Quebec – 75 seats ==
Riding	Candidate	Gender	Residence	Occupation	Votes	%	Rank	Biographical Notes	Ref.
Abitibi—Baie-James—Nunavik—Eeyou	Erica Martin	F	Montreal	Student	2,276	8.2	4th		
Abitibi—Témiscamingue	Christine Moore	F	Dupuy	Nurse	4,151	9.5	4th		
Ahuntsic	Alexandra Bélec	F	Montreal	Lawyer	4,276	9.0	4th		
Alfred-Pellan	Cynthia Roy	F	Mirabel	Mother	6,406	12.0	4th		
Argenteuil—Papineau—Mirabel	Alain Senécal	M	Mirabel	Automatisms technician	6,819	12.4	4th		
Bas-Richelieu—Nicolet—Bécancour	Nourredine Seddiki	M	Sorel-Tracy	Professor	4,010	8.2	4th		
Beauce	Véronique Poulin	F	Quebec City	Student	4,352	8.5	4th		
Beauharnois—Salaberry	Anne Minh-Thu Quach	F	Valleyfield	Teacher	6,214	11.6	4th		
Beauport—Limoilou	Simon-Pierre Beaudet	M	Quebec City	Professor	5,986	12.2	4th		
Berthier—Maskinongé	André Chauvette	M	Saint-Gabriel	Responsible for project in prevention of criminality	5,864	10.4	4th		
Bourassa	Samira Laouni	F	Laval	Self-employed	3,188	8.0	4th		
Brome—Missisquoi	Christelle Bogosta	F	Bedford	Drug addiction treatment	4,514	9.05	4th		
Brossard—La Prairie	Hoang Mai	M	Montreal	Notary	7,452	12.7	4th		
Chambly—Borduas	Serge Gélinas	M	Chambly	Advisor	8,998	14.2	4th		
Charlesbourg—Haute-Saint-Charles	Anne-Marie Day	F	Quebec City	Director	6,542	13.1	4th		
Châteauguay—Saint-Constant	Sonia Jurado	F	Saint-Philippe	Development agent	8,261	15.0	4th		
Chicoutimi—Le Fjord	Stéphane Girard	M	Chicoutimi	Secondary school teacher	3,742	7.8	4th		
Compton—Stanstead	Jean Rousseau	M	Saint-Denis-de-Brompton	Human resources advisor	5,843	11.3	4th		
Drummond	Annick Corriveau	F	Drummondville	Responsible for diffusion	7,460	16.5	4th		
Gaspésie—Îles-de-la-Madeleine	Gaston Langlais	M	Gaspé	Retired	2,549	7.0	4th		
Gatineau	Françoise Boivin	F	Gatineau	Lawyer	13,612	26.1	2nd	Boivin is the former Liberal MP (2004–2006) for Gatineau.	
Haute-Gaspésie—La Mitis—Matane—Matapédia	Julie Demers	F	Montreal	Writer-translator	1,497	4.7	4th		
Hochelaga	Jean-Claude Rocheleau	M	Montreal	Union president	6,600	14.4	3rd		
Honoré-Mercier	François Pilon	M	Montreal	Civil servant	4,986	10.1	4th	Elected in the 2011 federal election	
Hull—Aylmer	Pierre Ducasse	M	Gatineau	Political advisor	10,454	19.8	3rd	Ran for the leadership of the party in 2003. Ran in the 1997, 2004 and 2006 elections in Manicouagan.	
Jeanne-Le Ber	Daniel Breton	M	Montreal	Ecologist	7,708	15.7	3rd		
Joliette	Francine Raynault	F	Crabtree	Volunteer	5,579	10.4	4th		
Jonquière—Alma	Jean-François Paradis	M	Montreal	Community organizor	2,475	4.9	4th		
Lac-Saint-Louis	Daniel Quinn	M	Pointe-Claire	Educator	8,105	15.8	3rd		
La Pointe-de-l'Île	Isabelle Maguire	F	Brossard	Environmental project leader	5,975	12.9	3rd		
LaSalle—Émard	Amy Darwish	F	Montreal	Youth speaker	5,622	13.2	4th		
Laurentides—Labelle	David Dupras	M	Mont-Tremblant	Student	4,896	9.2	4th		
Laurier—Sainte-Marie	François Grégoire	M	Montreal	Teacher	8,209	17.1	3rd		
Laval	Alain Giguère	M	Laval	Lawyer	6,289	12.5	4th		
Laval—Les Îles	Zahia El-Masri	F	Montreal	Facilitator	6,124	11.5	4th		
Lévis—Bellechasse	Gabriel Biron	M	Quebec City	Communication consultant	5,856	10.8	4th		
Longueuil—Pierre-Boucher	Lise St-Denis	F	Montreal	Teacher	7,021	14.0	4th		
Lotbinière—Chutes-de-la-Chaudière	Raymond Côté	M	Quebec City	Operator	6,828	13.2	3rd		
Louis-Hébert	Denis Blanchette	M	Quebec City	Information Annalist	5,403	9.3	4th		
Louis-Saint-Laurent	Alexandrine Latendresse	F	Quebec City	Student	5,252	10.5	4th		
Manicouagan	Michaël Chicoine	M	Sept-Îles	Security guard	1,491	4.8	4th		
Marc-Aurèle-Fortin	Benoît Beauchamp	M	Montreal	Teacher	6,907	12.3	4th		
Mégantic—L'Érable	Bruno Vézina	M	Irlande	Forestry worker	4,191	9.5	4th		
Montcalm	Marie-Josée Beauchamp	F	Montreal	Communications councillor	8,337	13.85	3rd		
Montmagny—L'Islet—Kamouraska—Rivière-du-Loup	Gaston Hervieux	M	L'Isle-Verte	Researcher	2,428	5.5	4th		
Montmorency—Charlevoix—Haute-Côte-Nord	Jonathan Tremblay	M	Beaupré	Student	3,332	7.7	4th		
Mount Royal	Nicolas Thibodeau	M	Mont-Royal	Administrative Director	2,733	7.7	3rd		
Notre-Dame-de-Grâce—Lachine	Peter Deslauriers	M	Montreal	Teacher	6,641	15.2	4th		
Outremont	Thomas Mulcair	M	Beaconsfield	Parliamentarian	14,348	39.5	1st	Incumbent Member of Parliament	
Papineau	Costas Zafiropoulos	M	Montreal	Quality Assurance Analyst	3,734	8.7	3rd		
Pierrefonds—Dollard	Shameem Siddiqui	M	Dollard-des-Ormeaux	Sales & Marketing	4,823	10.5	3rd		
Pontiac	Céline Brault	F	Chelsea	Teacher	6,616	15.4	4th		
Portneuf—Jacques-Cartier	André Turgeon	M	Sainte-Brigitte-de-Laval	Nurse	5,707	12.7	4th		
Québec	Catherine Roy-Goyette	F	Quebec City	Researcher	5,933	11.8	4th		
Repentigny	Réjean Bellemare	M	Le Gardeur	Economist	8,853	15.1	2nd		
Richmond—Arthabaska	Stéphane Ricard	M	Sainte-Clotilde-de-Horton	Entrepreneur	4,509	8.7	4th		
Rimouski-Neigette—Témiscouata—Les Basques	Guy Caron	M	Gatineau	Economist	4,084	10.3	4th		
Rivière-des-Mille-Îles	Normand Beaudet	M	Blainville	Multimedia consultant	6,741	13.26	4th	Beaudet has served as president of Montreal's Centre de ressources sur la non-violence. In 1994, he released a book entitled Le mythe de la defense canadienne. He had previously sought election as a NDP candidate in Terrebonne—Blainville in 2000 and 2004.	
Rivière-du-Nord	Simon Bernier	M	Mirabel	Junior engineer	7,187	14.5	2nd		
Roberval—Lac-Saint-Jean	Catherine Forbes	F	Montreal	Nurse	1,738	4.7	4th		
Rosemont—La Petite-Patrie	Alexandre Boulerice	M	Montreal	Union advisor	8,522	16.3	3rd		
Saint-Bruno—Saint-Hubert	Vesna Vesic	F	Saint-Bruno-de-Montarville	Community organizer	7,154	13.5	4th		
Saint-Hyacinthe—Bagot	Brigitte Sansoucy	F	Saint-Hyacinthe	Administrative assistant	6,721	14.0	3rd		
Saint-Jean	Philippe Refghi	M	Longueuil	Student	5,529	10.3	4th		
Saint-Lambert	Richard Marois	M	Brossard	Environmental consultant	6,280	14.5	4th		
Saint-Laurent—Cartierville	Jerome Rodrigues	M	Dorval	Retail sales consultant	3,654	9.0	4th		
Saint-Léonard—Saint-Michel	Laura Colella	F	Gatineau	Lawyer	4,039	10.7	4th		
Saint-Maurice—Champlain	Anne Marie Aubert	F	Montreal	Communication agent	3,601	7.8	4th		
Shefford	Simon Gnocchini Messier	M	Bromont	Textbook salesman	6,323	12.5	4th	Gnocchini Messier was a town councillor in Stanbridge Station from 2001 to 2003 and in 2007 was elected as a school trustee for the Commission scolaire du Val-des-Cerfs. He also sought election to the National Assembly of Quebec in 2003 and has run for municipal office in Bedford and Bromont.	
Sherbrooke	Yves Mondoux	M	Austin	Environmentalist, television host	6,676	13.1	4th		
Terrebonne—Blainville	Michel Le Clair	M	Terrebonne	Bell Canada network coordinator	7,278	13.5	4th		
Trois-Rivières	Geneviève Boivin	F	Bécancour	Coordinator	4,544	9.2	4th		
Vaudreuil—Soulanges	Maxime Héroux-Legault	M	Notre-Dame-de-l'Île-Perrot	Student	6,298	9.6	4th		
Verchères—Les Patriotes	Raphaël Fortin	M	Montreal	Responsible for the reception house	8,388	15.5	3rd		
Westmount—Ville-Marie	Anne Lagacé Dowson	F	Montreal	Journalist	8,904	22.9	2nd	Television host	

== Ontario – 106 seats ==
Riding	Candidate	Gender	Residence	Occupation	Votes	%	Rank	Biographical notes	Ref.
Ajax—Pickering	Bala Thavarajasoorier	M	Ajax	Unemployed	4,422	9.1	3rd		
Algoma—Manitoulin—Kapuskasing	Carol Hughes	F	Hanmer	Representative	15,249	45.5	1st	Candidate in 2004 and 2006 in this riding.	
Ancaster—Dundas—Flamborough—Westdale	Gordon Guyatt	M	Dundas	Physician	9,632	17.0	3rd	Internationally renowned medical researcher	
Barrie	Myrna Clark	F	Barrie	Teacher	6,403	12.0	3rd		
Beaches—East York	Marilyn Churley	F	Toronto	Researcher/Writer	14,875	32.1	2nd	Former Member of Provincial Parliament	
Bramalea—Gore—Malton	Jash Puniya	M	Brampton	IT Professional	5,945	12.0	3rd		
Brampton—Springdale	Mani Singh	M	Brampton	Real Estate ES Representative	5,238	11.6	3rd		
Brampton West	Jagtar Shergill	M	Brampton	Insurance and Financial Advisor	7,334	13.6	3rd		
Brant	Brian Van Tilborg	M	Brantford	Coordinator of Adjustment Centre	9,331	17.2	3rd		
Bruce—Grey—Owen Sound	Jill McIllwraith	F	Markdale	Registered Practical Nurse	4,640	9.6	4th		
Burlington	David Laird	M	Burlington	Social Worker	6,597	11.2	3rd		
Cambridge	Max Lombardi	M	Cambridge	Information Technologist	10,044	19.6	3rd		
Carleton—Mississippi Mills	Paul Arbour	M	Kanata	Software Engineer	6,583	9.6	4th		
Chatham-Kent—Essex	Ron Cadotte	M	Chatham	Retired	6,850	16.4	3rd		
Davenport	Peter Ferreira	M	Mississauga	Immigration Consultant	10,896	31.3	2nd		
Don Valley East	Mary Trapani Hynes	F	Toronto	Educator/Retired	5,062	13.3	3rd		
Don Valley West	David Sparrow	M	Toronto	Actor/Writer/Film Maker	5,102	10.2	3rd		
Dufferin—Caledon	Jason Bissett	M	Bolton	Sales	4,385	10.0	4th		
Durham	Andrew McKeever	M	Bowmanville	Animal control	5,485	10.4	4th	On the ballot, but pulled out	
Eglinton—Lawrence	Justin Chatwin	M	Toronto	Student/Waiter	3,663	8.4	3rd		
Elgin—Middlesex—London	Ryan Dolby	M	Shedden	Assembler – Lear St. Thomas	9,135	19.2	3rd		
Essex	Taras Natyshak	M	Belle River	Labourer	13,703	26.6	3rd	Later won election to the Legislative Assembly of Ontario for the same district in the 2011 provincial election.	
Etobicoke Centre	Joseph Schwarz	M		financial/insurance representative	4,164	8.3	3rd		
Etobicoke Lakeshore	Liam McHugh-Russell	M		lawyer	5,950	11.7	3rd		
Etobicoke North	Ali Naqvi	M		lawyer	4,940	15.7	3rd		
Glengarry—Prescott—Russell	Jean-Sébastien Caron	M	Casselman	Teacher	5,678	10.5	3rd		
Guelph	Tom King	M	Guelph	Author, broadcaster, academic	9.713	16.5	4th		
Haldimand—Norfolk	Ian Nichols	M	Simcoe	Transportation Engineer	5,549	11.5	3rd		
Haliburton—Kawartha Lakes—Brock	Stephen Yardy	M	Lindsay	Student	7,952	14.6	3rd	Youngest candidate in the 2008 election	
Halton	Rob Wagner	M	Toronto	Municipal Administrator	6,118	8.8	3rd		
Hamilton Centre	David Christopherson	M	Hamilton	Parliamentarian	20,010	49.3	1st	Member of Parliament	
Hamilton East—Stoney Creek	Wayne Marston	M	Hamilton	Parliamentarian	19,919	41.3	1st	Member of Parliament. Nominated February 23, 2007.	
Hamilton Mountain	Chris Charlton	F	Hamilton	Parliamentarian	22,796	43.7	1st	Member of Parliament	
Huron—Bruce	Tony McQuail	M	Lucknow	Farmer	7,426	15.0	3rd		
Kenora	Tania Cameron	F	Kenora	Band Manager	5,394	23.2	3rd		
Kingston and the Islands	Rick Downes	M	Kingston	Elementary vice principal	10,158	17.5	3rd		
Kitchener Centre	Oz Cole-Arnal	M	Waterloo	Retired Professor	8,122	18.1	3rd		
Kitchener—Conestoga	Rod McNeil	M	Kitchener	Small Business Owner	7,173	15.0	3rd		
Kitchener—Waterloo	Cindy Jacobsen	F	Waterloo	Pastor and Therapist	8,915	14.7	3rd		
Lambton—Kent—Middlesex	Joe Hill	M	Sarnia	Small Business Owner	7,427	15.5	3rd		
Lanark—Frontenac—Lennox and Addington	Sandra Willard	F	Bath	Home Care Worker	7,112	13.1	3rd		
Leeds—Grenville	Steve Armstrong	M	Brockville	Manufacturing Service Controller	6,511	13.9	3rd		
London—Fanshawe	Irene Mathyssen	F	Ilderton	Teacher	17,672	43.1	1st	Current Member of Parliament. Nominated February 25, 2007.	
London North Centre	Stephen Holmes	M	London	Transit Operator	9,387	17.5	3rd		
London West	Peter Lawrence Ferguson	M	London	Scientist/Researcher	8,409	14.6	3rd		
Markham—Unionville	Nadine Hawkins	F	Markham	Business Woman	4,682	10.2	3rd		
Mississauga—Brampton South	Karan Pandher	M	Brampton	Postal Clerk	5,268	11.8	3rd		
Mississauga East—Cooksville	Satish Balasunderam	M	Mississauga	Lawyer	4,632	11.4	3rd		
Mississauga—Erindale	Mustafa Rivzi	M	Mississauga	Adjuster	4,774	8.5	3rd		
Mississauga South	Matt Turner	M	Mississauga	Barista-Starbucks	4,104	8.8	3rd		
Mississauga—Streetsville	Keith Pinto	M	Mississauga	Student	4,710	9.9	3rd		
Nepean—Carleton	Phil Brown	M	Ottawa	Planner	6,946	9.7	4th		
Newmarket—Aurora	Mike Seward	M	Aurora	Shipper/Receiver	4,458	8.5	3rd		
Niagara Falls	Eric Gillespie	M	Toronto	Lawyer	9,186	17.9	3rd		
Niagara West—Glanbrook	Dave Heatley	M	Hamilton	Retired	7,980	14.8	3rd		
Nickel Belt	Claude Gravelle	M	Chelmsford	Retired	19,021	46.5	1st		
Nipissing—Timiskaming	Dianna Allen	F	Parry Sound	Self Employed	6,582	15.8	3rd		
Northumberland—Quinte West	Russ Christianson	M	Campbellford	Consultant	8,230	14.5	3rd		
Oak Ridges—Markham	Andy Arifin	M	Markham	Student/Recent Graduate	7,126	9.4	3rd		
Oakville	Michelle Bilek	F	Oakville	Teacher	4,143	7.5	4th		
Oshawa	Mike Shields	M	Courtice	Negotiator	16,750	34.7	2nd		
Ottawa Centre	Paul Dewar	M	Ottawa	Parliamentarian	25,399	39.7	1st	Member of Parliament	
Ottawa—Orléans	Amy O'Dell	F	Ottawa	Employment Counsellor/Teacher	6,025	9.9	3rd		
Ottawa South	Hijal De Sarkar	M	Ottawa	Student	4,920	8.5	3rd		
Ottawa—Vanier	Trevor Haché	M	Ottawa	Outreach & Information Coordinator	8,845	17.1	3rd		
Ottawa West—Nepean	Marlene Rivier	F	Ottawa	Psychological Associate	6,432	11.5	3rd	Rivier won the nomination May 17, 2007.	
Oxford	Diane Abbott	F	Ingersoll	Lawyer	7,982	18.0	3rd		
Parkdale—High Park	Peggy Nash	F	Toronto	Labour Negotiator	17,332	36.0	2nd	Member of Parliament. Nominated February 11, 2007.	
Parry Sound-Muskoka	Jo-Anne Boulding	F	Bracebridge	Lawyer	5,355	12.3	3rd		
Perth Wellington	Kerry McManus	F	Stratford	Teacher	7,334	17.0	3rd		
Peterborough	Steve Sharpe	M	Peterborough	Teacher	8,115	13.9	3rd		
Pickering—Scarborough East	Andrea Moffatt	F	Pickering	Consultant	4,875	10.6	3rd		
Prince Edward—Hastings	Michael McMahon	M	Belleville	Retired High School Teacher	7,156	13.8	3rd		
Renfrew—Nipissing—Pembroke	Sue McSheffrey	F	Renfrew		5,175	10.9	3rd		
Richmond Hill	Wess Dowsett	M	Richmond Hill	Staff Representative	4,526	9.9		nominated June 13, 2007.	
St. Catharines	George N. Addison	M	St. Catharines	Chaplain	9,428	18.4	3rd	received the nomination on May 3, 2007	
St. Paul's	Anita Agrawal	F	Toronto	Manager	6,666	12.8	3rd		
Sarnia—Lambton	Andy Bruziewicz	M	Sarnia	City councillor	10,037	21.6	2nd		
Sault Ste. Marie	Tony Martin								
Scarborough—Agincourt	Simon Dougherty	M							
Scarborough Centre	Natalie Hundt	F							
Scarborough-Guildwood	Sania Khan	F							
Scarborough—Rouge River	Ryan Sloan	M							
Scarborough Southwest	Alamgir Hussain	M							
Simcoe—Grey	Katy Austin	F							
Simcoe North	Richard Banigan	M							
Stormont—Dundas—South Glengarry	Darlene Jalbert	F							
Sudbury	Glenn Thibeault	M							
Thunder Bay—Rainy River	John Rafferty	M							
Thunder Bay—Superior North	Bruce Hyer	M							
Timmins-James Bay	Charlie Angus	M							
Toronto Centre	El-Farouk Khaki	M							
Toronto—Danforth	Jack Layton	M							
Trinity—Spadina	Olivia Chow	F							
Vaughan	Vicky Wilkin	F							
Welland	Malcolm Allen	M							
Wellington—Halton Hills	Noel Duignan	M							
Whitby—Oshawa	David Purdy	M							
Willowdale	Susan Wallace	M							
Windsor—Tecumseh	Joe Comartin	M							
Windsor West	Brian Masse	M							
York Centre	Kurtis Baily	M							
York—Simcoe	Sylvia Gerl	F							
York South—Weston	Mike Sullivan	M							
York West	Giulio Manfrini								

== Manitoba – 14 seats ==
Riding	Candidate	Notes	Gender	Residence	Occupation	Votes	%	Rank	Biographical notes	Ref.
Brandon—Souris	Jean Luc Bouché		M	Brandon	Locomotive Engineer	6,055	17.7%	2nd		
Charleswood—St. James—Assiniboia	Fiona Shiells		F	Winnipeg	Ministerial Assistant	7,190	17.9%	3rd		
Churchill	Niki Ashton	2006 Candidate in this riding	F	Thompson	Researcher	8,734	47.5%	1st		
Dauphin—Swan River—Marquette	Ron Strynadka		M	Birtle	Retired	4,914	16.6%	2nd		
Elmwood—Transcona	Jim Maloway	Former MLA for Elmwood	M	Winnipeg	Small Businessman	14,355	45.8%	1st		
Kildonan—St. Paul	Ross Eadie		M	Winnipeg	Self Employed / Consultant	12,093	32.7%	2nd		
Portage—Lisgar	Mohamed Alli		M	Winnipeg	Distribution Centre Associate	2,353	7.3%	4th		
Provencher	Ross C. Martin		M	Oakbank	Design Coordinator	4,947	13.7%	2nd		
Saint Boniface	Matt Schaubroeck		M	Winnipeg	Student	5,502	13.1%	3rd		
Selkirk—Interlake	Patricia Cordner		F	Selkirk	Retired	9,506	24.7%	2nd		
Winnipeg Centre	Pat Martin	Incumbent MP	M	Winnipeg	Parliamentarian	12,285	48.9%	1st		
Winnipeg North	Judy Wasylycia-Leis	Incumbent MP	F	Winnipeg	Parliamentarian	14,097	62.6%	1st		
Winnipeg South	Sean Robert		M	Winnipeg	Product Consultant – MLCC	4,673	11.4%	3rd		
Winnipeg South Centre	Rachel Heinrichs		F	Winnipeg	Student	5,490	14.1%	3rd		

== Saskatchewan – 14 seats ==
Riding	Candidate	Notes	Gender	Residence	Occupation	Votes	%	Rank	Biographical Notes	Ref.
Battlefords—Lloydminster	Bob Woloshyn		M		businessman	6,572	25.28	2nd		
Blackstrap	Patti Gieni		F		labour unionist	9,876	25.68	2nd		
Cypress Hills—Grasslands	Scott Wilson		M			4,394	15.77	2nd		
Desnethé—Missinippi—Churchill River	Brian Morin		M			3,414	17.77	3rd		
Palliser	Don Mitchell	former mayor of Moose Jaw	M			10,865	33.85	2nd		
Prince Albert	Valerie Mushinski		F			8,243	28.76	2nd		
Regina—Lumsden—Lake Centre	Fred Kress		M			8,963	28.52	2nd		
Regina—Qu'Appelle	Janice Bernier		F			8,699	32.06	2nd		
Saskatoon—Humboldt	Scott Ruston		M			9,632	27.84	2nd		
Saskatoon—Rosetown—Biggar	Nettie Wiebe		F			11,969	44.41	2nd		
Saskatoon—Wanuskewin	Clint Davidson		M			7,898	24.36	2nd		
Souris—Moose Mountain	Raquel Fletcher		F			4,599	16.80	2nd		
Wascana	Stephen Moore		M			5,418	14.66	3rd		
Yorkton—Melville	Doug Ottenbreit		M			6,076	20.84	2nd		

== Alberta – 28 seats ==
Riding	Candidate	Notes	Gender	Residence	Occupation	Votes	%	Rank	Biographical Notes	Ref.
Calgary Centre	Tyler Kinch		M		graphic designer	4,223	9.19	4th		
Calgary Centre-North	John Chan		M		environmental inspector	7,417	15.32	2nd		
Calgary East	Ian Vaughan		M		student	3,767	11.75	2nd		
Calgary Northeast	Vinay Dey		M							
Calgary—Nose Hill	Stephanie Sundberg		F		student	3,953	7.86	4th		
Calgary Southeast	Chris Willott		M		quality assurance analyst	4,024	7.19	4th		
Calgary Southwest	Holly Heffernan		F		nurse					
Calgary West	Teale Phelps Bondaroff		M							
Crowfoot	Ellen Parker		F			3,783	7.88	2nd		
Edmonton Centre	Donna Martyn		F		teacher	6,912	14.97	3rd		
Edmonton East	Ray Martin		M			13,318	31.80	2nd		
Edmonton—Leduc	Hana Razga		F			5,994	11.42	3rd		
Edmonton—Mill Woods—Beaumont	Michael Butler		M			6,297	15.11	3rd		
Edmonton—St. Albert	Dave Burkhart		M	St. Albert		8,045	15.77	2nd		
Edmonton—Sherwood Park	Brian LaBelle		M			6,339	12.88	3rd		
Edmonton—Spruce Grove	Barbara Ann Phillips		F			6,627	12.47	2nd		
Edmonton—Strathcona	Linda Duncan		F			20,103	42.58	1st		
Fort McMurray—Athabasca	Mark Voyageur		M			3,300	12.90	2nd		
Lethbridge	Mark Sandilands		M			6,733	14.21	2nd		
Macleod	Stan Knowlton		M			3,053	6.68	3rd		
Medicine Hat	Wally Regehr		M		teacher	4,187	11.01	2nd		
Peace River	Adele Boucher Rymhs		F			6,124	14.40	2nd		
Red Deer	Stuart Somerville		M			5,040	11.10	2nd		
Vegreville—Wainwright	Raymond Stone		M		farmer	4,230	9.45	2nd		
Westlock—St. Paul	Della Drury		F			3,809	10.13	2nd		
Wetaskiwin	Tim Robson		M			3,636	8.62	2nd		
Wild Rose	Jeff Horvath		M		teacher	4,169	8.24	3rd		
Yellowhead	Ken Kuzminski		M			4,587	12.26	2nd		

== British Columbia – 36 seats ==
=== Abbotsford ===
- Bonnie Rai

=== British Columbia Southern Interior ===
- Alex Atamanenko, Incumbent MP.

=== Burnaby—Douglas ===
- Bill Siksay, Incumbent MP.

=== Burnaby—New Westminster ===
- Peter Julian, Incumbent MP.

=== Cariboo—Prince George ===
- Bev Collins

=== Chilliwack—Fraser Canyon ===
- Helen Kormendy

=== Delta—Richmond East ===
- Szilvia Barna

=== Esquimalt—Juan de Fuca ===
- Jennifer Burgis

=== Fleetwood—Port Kells ===
- Nao Fernando

Ran as an Alberta NDP candidate in the electoral district of Edmonton-Whitemud for the 1989 Alberta general election. He finished in third place out of three candidates losing to Percy Wickman and defeating incumbent Premier Don Getty.

=== Kamloops—Thompson—Cariboo ===
- Michael Crawford

=== Kelowna—Lake Country ===
- Tish Lakes

=== Kootenay—Columbia ===
- Leon Pendleton

=== Langley ===
- Andrew Claxton

=== Nanaimo—Alberni ===
- Zeni Maartman

=== Nanaimo—Cowichan ===
- Jean Crowder, MP.

=== Newton—North Delta ===
- Teresa Townsley

=== New Westminster—Coquitlam ===
- Dawn Black, MP.

=== North Vancouver ===
- Michael Charrois

=== Okanagan—Coquihalla ===
- Ralph Poynting

=== Okanagan—Shuswap ===
- Alice Brown

=== Pitt Meadows—Maple Ridge—Mission ===
- Mike Bocking

=== Port Moody—Westwood—Port Coquitlam ===
- Zoë Royer

=== Prince George—Peace River ===
- Betty Bekkering

=== Richmond ===
- Dale Jackaman

=== Saanich—Gulf Islands ===
- Julian West (on the ballot, but pulled out)

=== Skeena—Bulkley Valley ===
- Nathan Cullen, MP

=== South Surrey—White Rock—Cloverdale ===
- Peter Prontzos

=== Surrey North ===
- Rachid Arab

=== Vancouver Centre ===
- Michael Byers

=== Vancouver East ===
- Libby Davies, MP

=== Vancouver Island North ===
- Catherine J. Bell

=== Vancouver Kingsway ===
- Don Davies

=== Vancouver Quadra ===
- David R. Caplan

=== Vancouver South ===
- Ann Chambers

=== Victoria ===
- Denise Savoie, MP

=== West Vancouver—Sunshine Coast—Sea to Sky Country ===
- Bill Forst

== Yukon – 1 seat ==
=== Yukon ===
- Ken Bolton

== Northwest Territories – 1 seat ==
=== Western Arctic ===
- Dennis Bevington, MP. Nominated January 18, 2007.

== Nunavut – 1 seat ==
=== Nunavut ===
- Paul Irngaut

== See also ==
- Results of the Canadian federal election, 2008
- Results by riding for the Canadian federal election, 2008
