= Glen Little (disambiguation) =

Glen Little (born 1975) is a former English footballer.

Glen Little may also refer to:

- Glen Little (clown) (1925–2010), American clown
- Glen Little (politician), Canadian politician
