= Knight's Cove =

Coordinates: 48°32′N 53°19′W

- Settlement
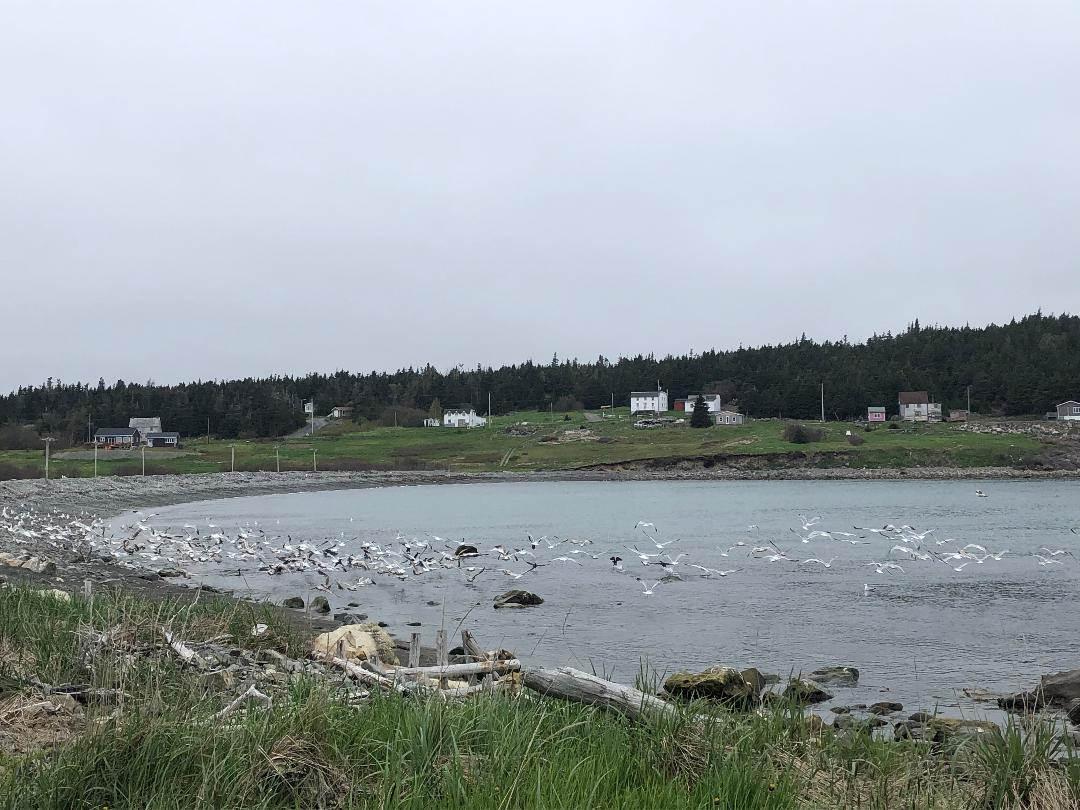
- Gulls taking of in Knight's Cove

- Location within Newfoundland
- Country: Canada
- Province: Newfoundland and Labrador

Population (2001)
  - Total: 62
- Time zone: UTC-3:30 (Newfoundland Time)
  - Summer (DST): UTC-2:30 (Newfoundland Daylight)
- Area code: 709
- Highways: Route 235

Knight's Cove is a village located southwest of Bonavista and west of Catalina on the island of Newfoundland in the Canadian province of Newfoundland and Labrador. It is part of the designated place of Knights Cove - Stock Cove.

Knight's Cove is a community in Blackhead Bay, approximately 20 km (12 mi) southwest of Bonavista. The current population is about 45 for the unincorporated township.

== History ==
Knight's Cove was probably first settled in the 1790s or early 1800s by families from nearby King's Cove. At that time, King's Cove was growing rapidly and several outlying coves were settled for shore space to prosecute the inshore fishery. Settlement was also attracted to Knight's Cove by the availability of land for gardens and livestock, as surplus produce found a ready market in King's Cove. Families that moved from King's Cove included the Aylwards, Ryans and Walshes. Knight's Cove had a population of 48 by the first census of Newfoundland in 1836. By 1857 the number of inhabitants had risen to 96 people, occupying nine fishing rooms, with two full-time farmers and four lumbermen. There was a Roman Catholic school and chapel between Knight's Cove and Stock Cove.

Knight's Cove was established as a Church of England and Roman Catholic community sometime before 1836, and may have been named after Reverend Richard Knight, D.D. (1788-1860), a much-loved resident of Bonavista in the early nineteenth century. There is also a local tradition that ascribes the name to a corruption of 'Night's Cove'. According to that tradition, merchants doing business in nearby Stock Cove found Knight's Cove more attractive for a night's stopover.

The first postmistress was Mrs. Elizabeth Walsh in 1952. It had a population of 161 in 1951. In 2001 there were still 62 inhabitants.

== See also ==
- List of communities in Newfoundland and Labrador
