= Summerville-Princeton-Southern Bay, Newfoundland and Labrador =

Summerville-Princeton-Southern Bay
- Local service district / designated place
- Location of Summerville-Princeton-Southern Bay Summerville-Princeton-Southern Bay (Canada)
- Coordinates: 48.418°N 53.578°W
- Country: Canada
- Province: Newfoundland and Labrador
- Region: Newfoundland
- Census division: 7
- Census subdivision: F

Government
  - Type: Unincorporated

Area
  - Land: 29.12 km^{2} (11.24 sq mi)

Population (2016)
  - Total: 310
- Time zone: UTC−03:30 (NST)
  - Summer (DST): UTC−02:30 (NDT)
- Area code: 709

Summerville-Princeton-Southern Bay is a local service district and designated place in the Canadian province of Newfoundland and Labrador.

== Geography ==
Summerville-Princeton-Southern Bay is in Newfoundland within Subdivision F of Division No. 7. It consists of the communities of Summerville, Princeton and Southern Bay.

== Demographics ==
As a designated place in the 2016 Census of Population conducted by Statistics Canada, Summerville-Princeton-Southern Bay recorded a population of 310 living in 153 of its 229 total private dwellings, a change of −15.5% from its 2011 population of 367. With a land area of 29.12 km^{2} (11.24 sq mi), it had a population density of 10.6/km^{2} (27.6/sq mi) in 2016.

== Government ==
Summerville-Princeton-Southern Bay is a local service district (LSD) that is governed by a committee responsible for the provision of certain services to the community. The chair of the LSD committee is Tony Harris.

== See also ==
- List of communities in Newfoundland and Labrador
- List of designated places in Newfoundland and Labrador
- List of local service districts in Newfoundland and Labrador
