= Aubrey Gover =

Canadian politician

The Honourable Aubrey Gover ECNL

Minister of Works, Services And Transportation
- In office February 12, 1992 – May 19, 1993
- Preceded by: Dave Gilbert
- Succeeded by: John Efford

MHA for Bonavista South
- In office 1989–1993
- Preceded by: Jim Morgan
- Succeeded by: Roger Fitzgerald

Minister of Justice
- In office November 12, 1991 – February 12, 1992
- Preceded by: Paul Dicks
- Succeeded by: Edward Roberts

Personal details
- Born: June 30, 1959 (age 67) St. John's, Newfoundland and Labrador
- Party: Liberal Party of Newfoundland and Labrador

Aubrey Trent Gover (born June 30, 1959) is a Canadian politician. He represented the electoral district of Bonavista South in the Newfoundland and Labrador House of Assembly from 1989 to 1993. He is a member of the Liberal Party of Newfoundland and Labrador. He was born in St. John's, Newfoundland and Labrador.
