= Neil King (politician) =

Canadian politician

Neil King MHA

Member of the Newfoundland and Labrador House of Assembly for Bonavista
- In office November 30, 2015 – April 17, 2019
- Preceded by: Riding Established
- Succeeded by: Craig Pardy

Personal details
- Party: Independent
- Other political affiliations: Liberal

Neil King is a Canadian politician. He represented the electoral district of Bonavista in the Newfoundland and Labrador House of Assembly as a member of the Liberal Party from 2015 until 2019. He was elected in the 2015 provincial election for the district of Bonavista and was defeated in the 2019 provincial election. In the 2021 Newfoundland and Labrador general election, King ran as an independent candidate after being rejected as the Liberal candidate. He lost, finishing third.

King previously served in the Canadian Navy.

== Electoral results ==
2021 Newfoundland and Labrador general election: Bonavista
Party	Candidate	Votes	%	±%
Progressive Conservative	Craig Pardy	2,117	57.32	+6.89
Liberal	Christine Gill	944	25.56	-24.00
Independent	Neil King	562	15.22	
New Democratic	Timothy Whey	70	1.90	
Total valid votes		3,693	99.49	
Total rejected ballots		19	0.51	
Turnout		3,712	40.48	
Eligible voters		9,169		
Progressive Conservative hold		Swing		+15.45
Source(s) "Officially Nominated Candidates General Election 2021" (PDF). Elections Newfoundland and Labrador. "NL Election 2021 (Unofficial Results)".

2019 Newfoundland and Labrador general election
Party	Candidate	Votes	%	±%
Progressive Conservative	Craig Pardy	2,611	50.43	+23.51
Liberal	Neil King	2,566	49.57	-16.45
Total valid votes		5,177	99.33	
Total rejected ballots		35	0.67	+0.09
Turnout		5,212	59.36	+1.28
Eligible voters		8,781		
Progressive Conservative gain from Liberal		Swing		+19.98

2015 Newfoundland and Labrador general election
Party	Candidate	Votes	%	±%
Liberal	Neil King	3,508	66.01	–
Progressive Conservative	Glen Little	1,431	26.93	–
Independent	Johanna Ryan Guy	259	4.88	–
New Democratic	Adrian Power	116	2.18	–
Total valid votes		5,314	99.42	–
Total rejected ballots		31	0.58	–
Turnout		5,345	58.08	–
Eligible voters		9,203		
Liberal notional gain from Progressive Conservative		Swing		–
Source: Elections Newfoundland and Labrador
