= Hodderville, Newfoundland and Labrador =

Coordinates: 48°32′00″N 53°18′00″W

Hodderville was a settlement adjoining the small promonotory making the junction of Wild Bay and Monk Bay, which lie within Bonavista Bay west of Catalina. The town was named after the first Postmistress Mrs. Edith Hodder.

== See also ==
- List of communities in Newfoundland and Labrador
