= Knights Cove - Stock Cove, Newfoundland and Labrador =

Knights Cove - Stock Cove
- Designated place
- Location of Knights Cove - Stock Cove Knights Cove - Stock Cove (Canada)
- Coordinates: 48.536°N 53.33°W
- Country: Canada
- Province: Newfoundland and Labrador
- Region: Newfoundland
- Census division: 7
- Census subdivision: G

Government
  - Type: Unincorporated

Area
  - Land: 4.14 km^{2} (1.60 sq mi)

Population (2016)
  - Total: 51
- Time zone: UTC−03:30 (NST)
  - Summer (DST): UTC−02:30 (NDT)
- Area code: 709

Knights Cove - Stock Cove is a designated place in the Canadian province of Newfoundland and Labrador.

== Geography ==
Knights Cove - Stock Cove is in Newfoundland within Subdivision G of Division No. 7. It consists of the communities of Knight's Cove and Stock Cove.

== Demographics ==
As a designated place in the 2016 Census of Population conducted by Statistics Canada, Knights Cove - Stock Cove recorded a population of 51 living in 27 of its 47 total private dwellings, a change of −41.4% from its 2011 population of 87. With a land area of 4.14 km^{2} (1.60 sq mi), it had a population density of 12.3/km^{2} (31.9/sq mi) in 2016.

== See also ==
- List of communities in Newfoundland and Labrador
- List of designated places in Newfoundland and Labrador
