= Roger Fitzgerald =

Canadian politician

Speaker of the Newfoundland and Labrador House of Assembly
- In office 2007 – October 27, 2011
- Preceded by: Harvey Hodder
- Succeeded by: Ross Wiseman

Member of the Newfoundland and Labrador House of Assembly for Bonavista South
- In office 1993 – September 19, 2011
- Preceded by: Aubrey Gover
- Succeeded by: Glen Little

Personal details
- Born: 5 May 1947 (age 78)
- Party: Newfoundland and Labrador Progressive Conservative Party

Roger Fitzgerald (born 5 May 1947) is a Canadian politician in Newfoundland and Labrador, Canada. He represented the district of Bonavista South from 1993 to 2011 and served as Speaker of the Newfoundland and Labrador House of Assembly.

Before entering politics, he worked as a journeyman electrician. He married Marjorie Noseworthy. Fitzgerald served as mayor of Musgravetown.

He is a member of the Progressive Conservative Party. He has served as Opposition Shadow Critic for Social Services, Fisheries and Aquaculture, Agrifoods, Development and Rural Renewa1, Industry, Trade and Rural Development, and Intergovernmental Affairs as a member of the Public Accounts Committee, as a Member of the Caucus Strategy Committee, and as Vice-Chair of the Caucus Economic Development Committee.

Fitzgerald ran unsuccessfully for a seat in the Newfoundland assembly in 1989, losing to Aubrey Gover; he was elected in 1993 and was reelected in 1996, 1999 and 2003. He was acclaimed in the 2007 Newfoundland and Labrador general election when his opponent withdrew from the race. In June 2011, he announced that he would not be running for reelection.

In 2017, Fitzgerald endorsed Ches Crosbie in the 2018 provincial PC leadership race.
