= Glen Little (politician) =

Canadian politician

Member of the Newfoundland and Labrador House of Assembly for Bonavista South
- In office October 27, 2011 – November 5, 2015
- Preceded by: Roger Fitzgerald
- Succeeded by: District Abolished

Personal details
- Party: Progressive Conservative

Glen Little is a Canadian politician in Newfoundland and Labrador. Little was elected to the Newfoundland and Labrador House of Assembly in the 2011 provincial election. A member of the Progressive Conservative Party of Newfoundland and Labrador, he represented the electoral district of Bonavista South from 2011 until 2015. In the 2015 provincial election, Little ran in the redistributed district of Bonavista, but lost to Liberal Neil King.

== Electoral record ==
2015 Newfoundland and Labrador general election
Party	Candidate	Votes	%	±%
Liberal	Neil King	3,504	65.8	–
Progressive Conservative	Glen Little	1,436	27.0	–
Independent	Johanna Ryan Guy	269	5.1	–
New Democratic	Adrian Power	116	2.2	–

2011 Newfoundland and Labrador general election
Party	Candidate	Votes	%	±%
Progressive Conservative	Glen Little	2,214	56.14%	–
NDP	Darryl Johnson	1,198	30.38%	
Liberal	Johanna Ryan Guy	532	13.49%	
