= Keels, Newfoundland and Labrador =

Keels
- Town
- Location of Keels in Newfoundland
- Coordinates: 48°36′20″N 53°24′20″W
- Country: Canada
- Province: Newfoundland and Labrador
- Census division: 7
- Historic countries: Kingdom of England; Kingdom of Great Britain; United Kingdom of Great Britain and Ireland; Dominion of Newfoundland
- Settled: 1702
- Incorporated: 1966

Government
  - Type: Town Council
  - Mayor: Annie Fitzgerald
  - MHA: Craig Pardy
  - MP: Jonathan Rowe

Area
  - Total: 6.67 km^{2} (2.58 sq mi)
- Elevation: 0–156 m (0–512 ft)

Population (2021)
  - Total: 46
  - Density: 6.9/km^{2} (18/sq mi)
- Time zone: UTC-3:30 (Newfoundland Time)
  - Summer (DST): UTC-2:30 (Newfoundland Daylight)
- Postal Code: A0C
- Area code: 709
- Total Dwellings: 50 (2021)

Keels is a small town in the Canadian province of Newfoundland and Labrador, located about 3 kilometres from Duntara. The population of this municipality in the 2016 Canadian National Census was 51. This is down from 61 in 2011 and 73 in 2006. The earlier population figures show it had 85 in 2001, 101 in 1996, 128 in 1991, 115 in 1986, 206 in 1956, 282 in 1945 and 372 in 1940.

Like many outport villages in Newfoundland such as Twillingate, population has been shrinking with the collapse of the cod fishing industry. Some of the highlights in Keels are the geological features known as "the Devil's Footprints" that are found on the rocks surrounding the town, the Anglican Cemetery that dates to the beginnings of the community, and a natural sea-spray phenomenon known as "Clark's Chimney Hole" on the coast. The one and only store located in the middle of the community has been owned by the Mesh family for generations.

There is also an Anglican church and a small wharf which was used for commercial fishing until the cod fishery moratorium in 1992. The community is somewhat of a tourist attraction due to the outdoor activities and also the fact that it is one of the smallest and oldest communities in Newfoundland. In addition, there are several restored homes that are excellent examples of outport architecture, including the restored "Orange Hall" which was once a meeting hall for the Orange Order.

== Demographics ==
In the 2021 Census of Population conducted by Statistics Canada, Keels had a population of 46 living in 25 of its 50 total private dwellings, a change of −9.8% from its 2016 population of 51. With a land area of 6.67 km^{2} (2.58 sq mi), it had a population density of 6.9/km^{2} (17.9/sq mi) in 2021.

Historical populations
Year	Pop.	±%
1869	590	—
1891	485	−17.8%
1935	371	−23.5%
1940	372	+0.3%
1945	283	−23.9%
1951	228	−19.4%
1956	208	−8.8%
1961	185	−11.1%
1966	175	−5.4%
1971	146	−16.6%
1976	142	−2.7%
1981	129	−9.2%
1986	115	−10.9%
1991	128	+11.3%
1996	101	−21.1%
2001	85	−15.8%
2006	73	−14.1%
2011	61	−16.4%
2016	51	−16.4%
2021	46	−9.8%

== Castle Cove ==
Castle Cove is a settlement in Newfoundland and Labrador. It is located inside the Town of Keels.

Castle Cove is currently uninhabited, however, many still go there for the swimming hole and berry picking.

In 1869, Castle Cove had a population of 72, with neighbouring Keels having 518 residents.

== See also ==
- List of communities in Newfoundland and Labrador
