= Wild Bay =

Coordinates: 48.5326°N 53.2955°W

Wild Bay is a natural bay on the coast of Labrador in the province of Newfoundland and Labrador, Canada. It lies within the southern reaches of Bonavista Bay, adjoining Monk Bay to the south.
