= Upper Amherst Cove =

Local service district and designated place in Newfoundland and Labrador, Canada

Coordinates: 48°33′23″N 53°13′55″W

Upper Amherst Cove, is a local service district and designated place in the Canadian province of Newfoundland and Labrador. Situated approximately 20 kilometers southeast of Bonavista, it lies just off Route 235.

== History ==
The nearest post office dates back to 1864 in Trinity Bay. The community was first settled by inshore fishermen in the mid-1800s, attracted by the abundant local resources. In addition to the cod fishery, residents engaged in winter logging in Blackhead Bay, which supplemented their incomes.

== Geography ==
Upper Amherst Cove is in Newfoundland within Subdivision G of Division No. 7. It is near Bonavista, just off Route 235.

== Demographics ==
As a designated place in the 2016 Census of Population conducted by Statistics Canada, Upper Amherst Cove recorded a population of 41 living in 19 of its 30 total private dwellings, a change of 13.9% from its 2011 population of 36. With a land area of 1.59 km^{2} (0.61 sq mi), it had a population density of 25.8/km^{2} (66.8/sq mi) in 2016.

== Government ==
Upper Amherst Cove is a local service district (LSD) that is governed by a committee responsible for the provision of certain services to the community. The chair of the LSD committee is David Borland.

== See also ==
- List of communities in Newfoundland and Labrador
- List of designated places in Newfoundland and Labrador
- List of local service districts in Newfoundland and Labrador
