= Amherst Cove =

- Unincorporated community
- Location of Amherst Cove in Newfoundland
- Coordinates: 48°34′36.8″N 53°12′16.1″W
- Country: Canada
- Province: Newfoundland and Labrador
- Settled: 1864

Population (1956)
  - Total: 279
- Time zone: UTC-3:30 (Newfoundland Time)
  - Summer (DST): UTC-2:30 (Newfoundland Daylight)
- Area code: 709
- Highways: Route 235; Route 237

Amherst Cove is a Canadian community in the province of Newfoundland and Labrador.

Located on the Bonavista Peninsula, the community was founded prior to 1864. Fishing is or was the major industry and the nearest port of entry was nine miles away in Bonavista. By 1911 it had one hotel and one church. The population was 240 in 1911 and 279 by 1956.

The community is broken into three distinct areas. There is a Lower, Middle and an Upper Amherst Cove. Each area is separated by approximately one kilometre.

The loss of the fishery in Newfoundland due to the cod moratorium in 1992 has had a severe impact on the population of Amherst Cove. Today, only a few families remain in this tiny coastal community.

== See also ==
- List of communities in Newfoundland and Labrador
