= Open Hall-Red Cliffe =

Local service district and designated place in Newfoundland and Labrador, Canada

Coordinates: 48°33′N 53°29′W

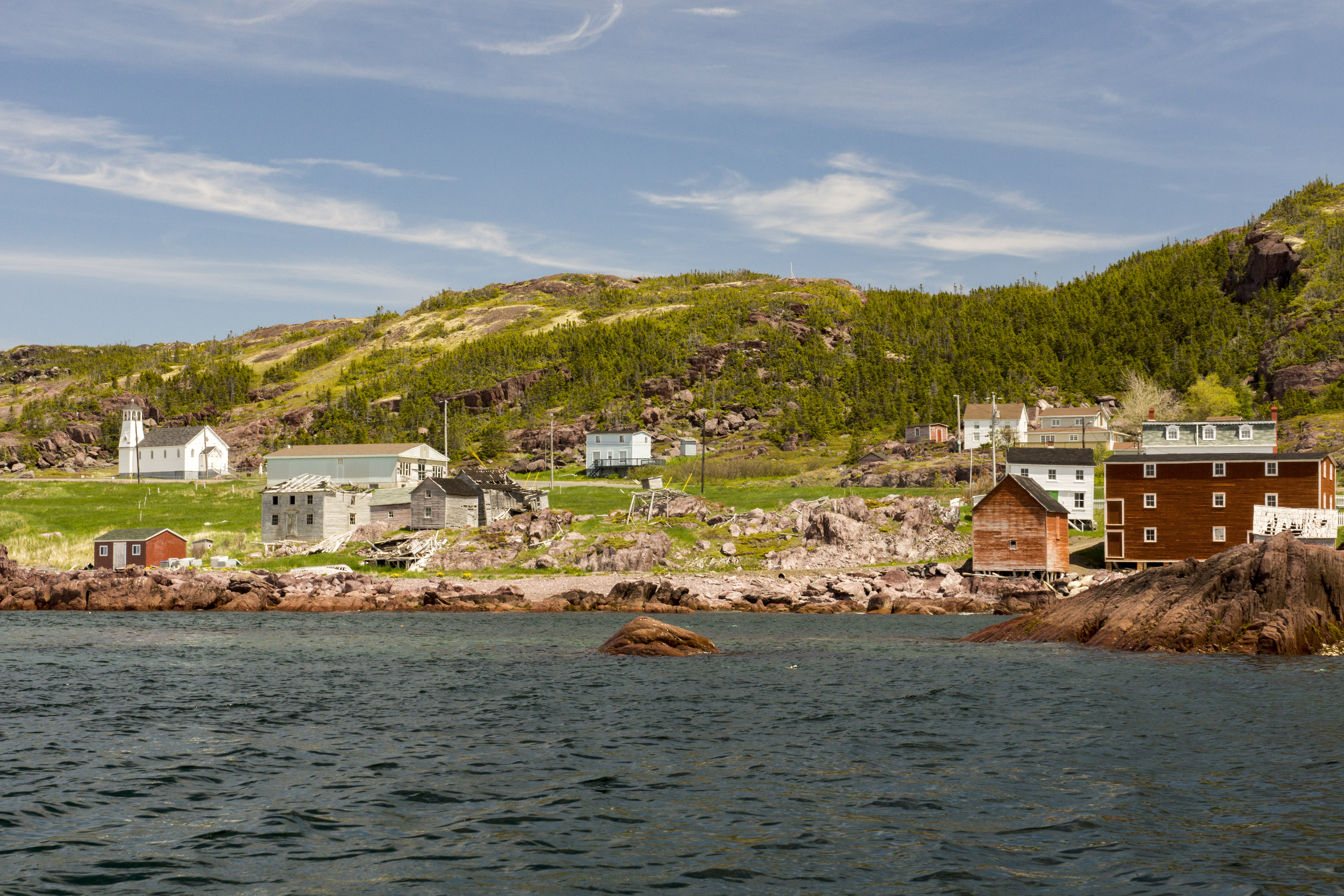
View of Red Cliff, Newfoundland, on the Bonavista Peninsula

Open Hall-Red Cliffe is a local service district and designated place in the Canadian province of Newfoundland and Labrador.

== History ==
Open Hall was settled around 1770 by Joseph Batt. Joseph Batt held a fishing room in Greenspond in 1769, however he moved from there to Open Hall in the next year. As a result, a nook in Open Hall Harbour arrived in his name, Joe Batts Cove.

It is likely that Open Hall was settled long before this date by French fishermen. However this was not recorded by British Authorities because of disputes over the territory. The original name of the settlement was Open Hole. This name was given by Dorset fishermen who colonized Bonavista Bay. Open Hole is translated from the French name " La Bonne Eau" which means Good Water.

== Geography ==
Open Hall-Red Cliffe is in Newfoundland within Subdivision F of Division No. 7. It is a fishing community located on the southern side of Bonavista Bay. Open Hall is about 30 km southwest of Bonavista. Open Hall has a relatively safe harbour, which is suitable for small-boat fishing. The landscape is rough. However, there is agricultural land which has been used since the start of the settlement.

== Demographics ==
As a designated place in the 2016 Census of Population conducted by Statistics Canada, Open Hall-Red Cliffe recorded a population of 60 living in 30 of its 58 total private dwellings, a change of -33.3% from its 2011 population of 90. With a land area of 4.19 km^{2} (1.62 sq mi), it had a population density of 14.3/km^{2} (37.1/sq mi) in 2016.

== Government ==
Open Hall-Red Cliffe is a local service district (LSD) that is governed by a committee responsible for the provision of certain services to the community.

== See also ==
- List of communities in Newfoundland and Labrador
- List of designated places in Newfoundland and Labrador
- List of local service districts in Newfoundland and Labrador
