= Stock Cove =

- Settlement
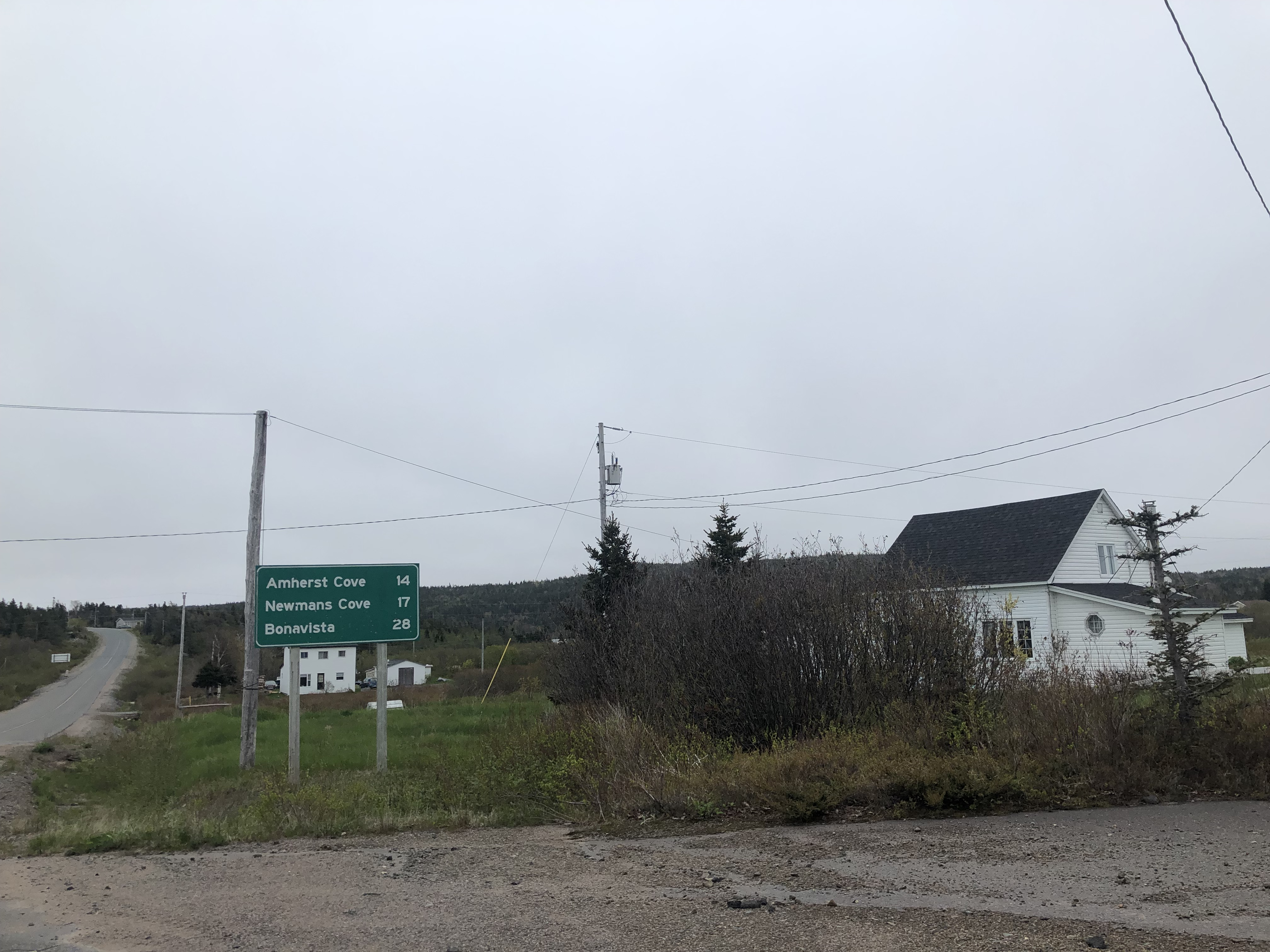
- Highway sign in Stock Cove

- Location within Newfoundland and Labrador
- Coordinates: 48.537°N 53.340°W
- Country: Canada
- Province: Newfoundland and Labrador

Population (2011)
  - Total: 45
- Time zone: UTC-3:30 (Newfoundland Time)
  - Summer (DST): UTC-2:30 (Newfoundland Daylight)
- Area code: 709
- Highways: Route 235; Route 236

Stock Cove is a settlement in Newfoundland and Labrador. It is part of the designated place of Knights Cove - Stock Cove.
