= Princeton, Newfoundland and Labrador =

Human settlement in Newfoundland and Labrador, Canada

Coordinates: 48.416°N 53.591°W

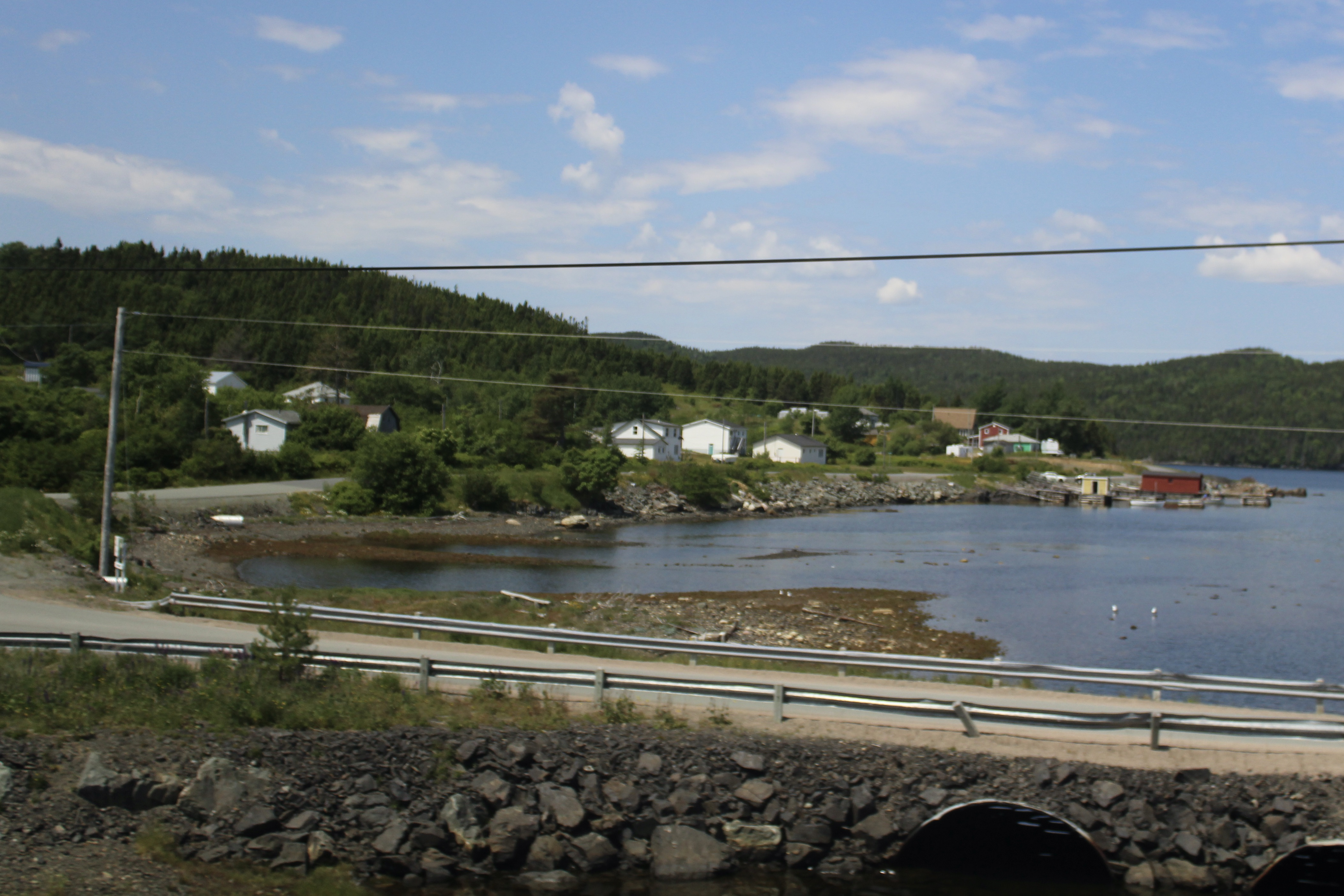
Princeton

Location of Princeton in Newfoundland and Labrador

Princeton is a settlement in Newfoundland and Labrador. It is part of the local service district of Summerville-Princeton-Southern Bay.

In 2024 the community consisted of at least 55 households.
