= Craig Pardy =

Canadian politician

The Honourable Craig Pardy ECNL MHA

Member of the Newfoundland and Labrador House of Assembly for Bonavista
- Incumbent
- Assumed office May 16, 2019
- Preceded by: Neil King

Minister of Finance
- Incumbent
- Assumed office October 29, 2025
- Preceded by: Siobhan Coady

Minister for Seniors
- Incumbent
- Assumed office October 29, 2025
- Preceded by: Jamie Korab

Mayor George's Brook-Milton
- In office May 8, 2018 – May 16, 2019
- Preceded by: Position established
- Succeeded by: Darren Ellis

Personal details
- Born: Port Union, Newfoundland and Labrador
- Party: Progressive Conservative
- Occupation: Teacher, politician

Craig Pardy is a Canadian politician who was elected to the Newfoundland and Labrador House of Assembly in the 2019 provincial election. He represents the electoral district of Bonavista as a member of the Newfoundland and Labrador Progressive Conservative Party. He was re-elected in the 2021 provincial election. Pardy supported Tony Wakeham in the 2023 provincial PC party leadership race.

Prior to politics, Pardy was a teacher and served as Chairperson of the Milton local service district and later as Mayor of the incorporated town of George's Brook-Milton. Pardy was diagnosed with cancer in 2021.

Pardy was re-elected in the 2025 Newfoundland and Labrador general election.

On October 29, 2025 Pardy was appointed Minister of Finance, President of Treasury board, Minister of Seniors, Minister Responsible for the Public Service Commission, Minister Responsible for the Newfoundland and Labrador Liquor Corporation.

On August 20, 2026, following a cabinet shuffle in the Wakeham ministry, Pardy was appointed to the position of Minister Responsible for the Office of the Chief Information Officer.

== Election results ==
2025 Newfoundland and Labrador general election: Bonavista
Party	Candidate	Votes	%	±%
Progressive Conservative	Craig Pardy	3,260	71.65	+14.32
Liberal	Heather Matthews	1,037	22.79	-2.77
New Democratic	David Ellis	253	5.56	+3.66
Total valid votes		4,550		
Total rejected ballots				
Turnout				
Eligible voters				
Progressive Conservative hold		Swing		+8.55

2021 Newfoundland and Labrador general election: Bonavista
Party	Candidate	Votes	%	±%
Progressive Conservative	Craig Pardy	2,117	57.32	+6.89
Liberal	Christine Gill	944	25.56	-24.00
Independent	Neil King	562	15.22	
New Democratic	Timothy Whey	70	1.90	
Total valid votes		3,693	99.49	
Total rejected ballots		19	0.51	
Turnout		3,712	40.48	
Eligible voters		9,169		
Progressive Conservative hold		Swing		+15.45
Source(s) "Officially Nominated Candidates General Election 2021" (PDF). Elections Newfoundland and Labrador. "NL Election 2021 (Unofficial Results)".

2019 Newfoundland and Labrador general election
Party	Candidate	Votes	%	±%
Progressive Conservative	Craig Pardy	2,611	50.43	+23.51
Liberal	Neil King	2,566	49.57	-16.45
Total valid votes		5,177	99.33	
Total rejected ballots		35	0.67	+0.09
Turnout		5,212	59.36	+1.28
Eligible voters		8,781		
Progressive Conservative gain from Liberal		Swing		+19.98
