= Cape Bonavista =

Headland on Newfoundland

Coordinates: 48°42′00″N 53°05′15″W

Location of Cape Bonavista in Newfoundland

Cape Bonavista is a headland located on the east coast of the island of Newfoundland in the Canadian province of Newfoundland and Labrador. It is located at the northeastern tip of the Bonavista Peninsula, which separates Trinity Bay to the south from Bonavista Bay to the north. The nearby town of Bonavista takes its name from this historic landmark.

John Cabot may have landed at this site on June 24, 1497 with his second expedition to North America (or at another time in the 15th century). Other Newfoundland locations also claim to be his landing site.

The lighthouse on Cape Bonavista was built in 1843. A thriving puffin colony is located on a craggy island separated from the Cape by a narrow, precipitous channel.

== Gallery ==
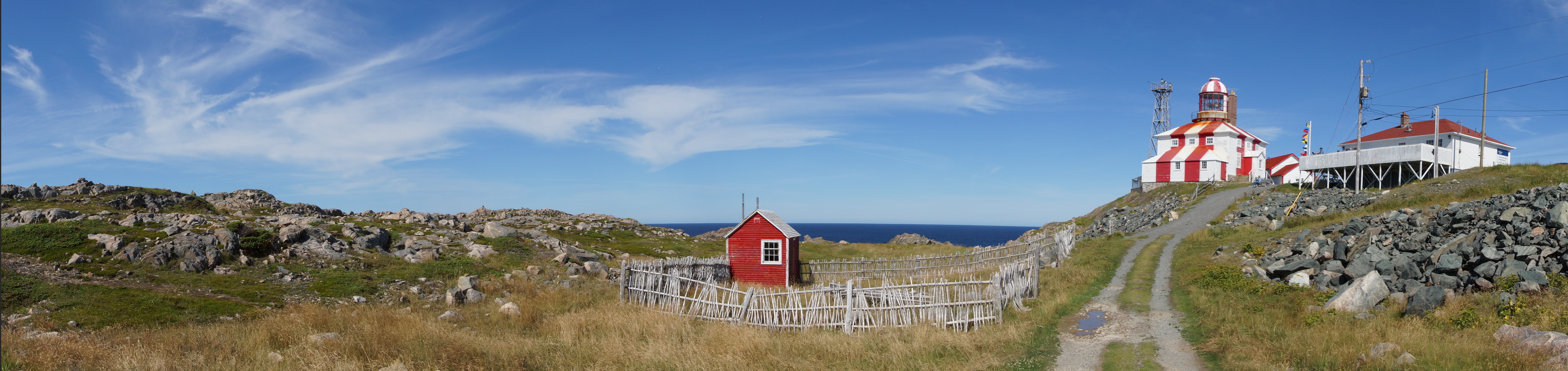
The lighthouse and surrounding landscape at the tip of Cape Bonavista
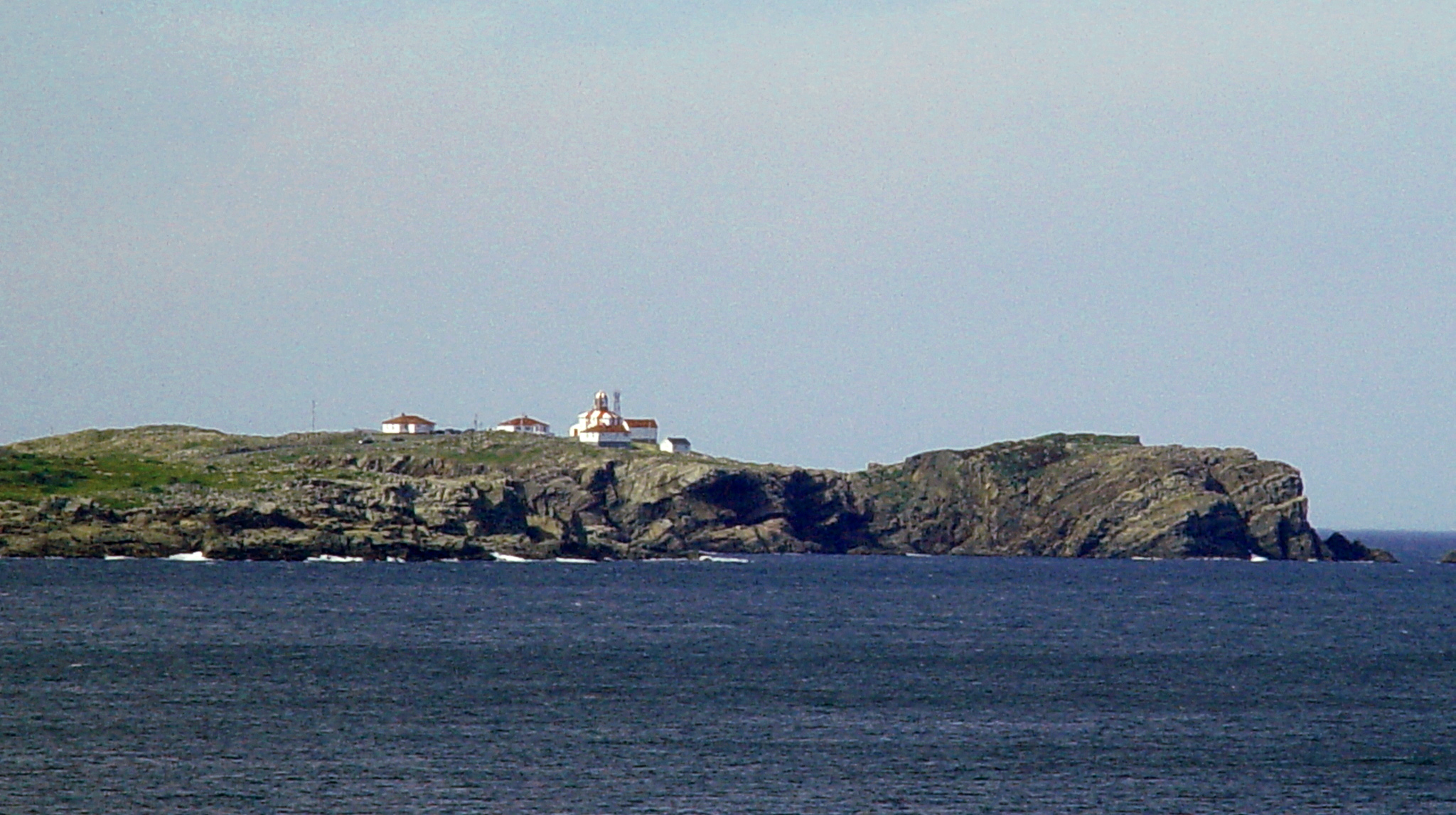
Cape Bonavista, looking northwest from Spillar's Cove

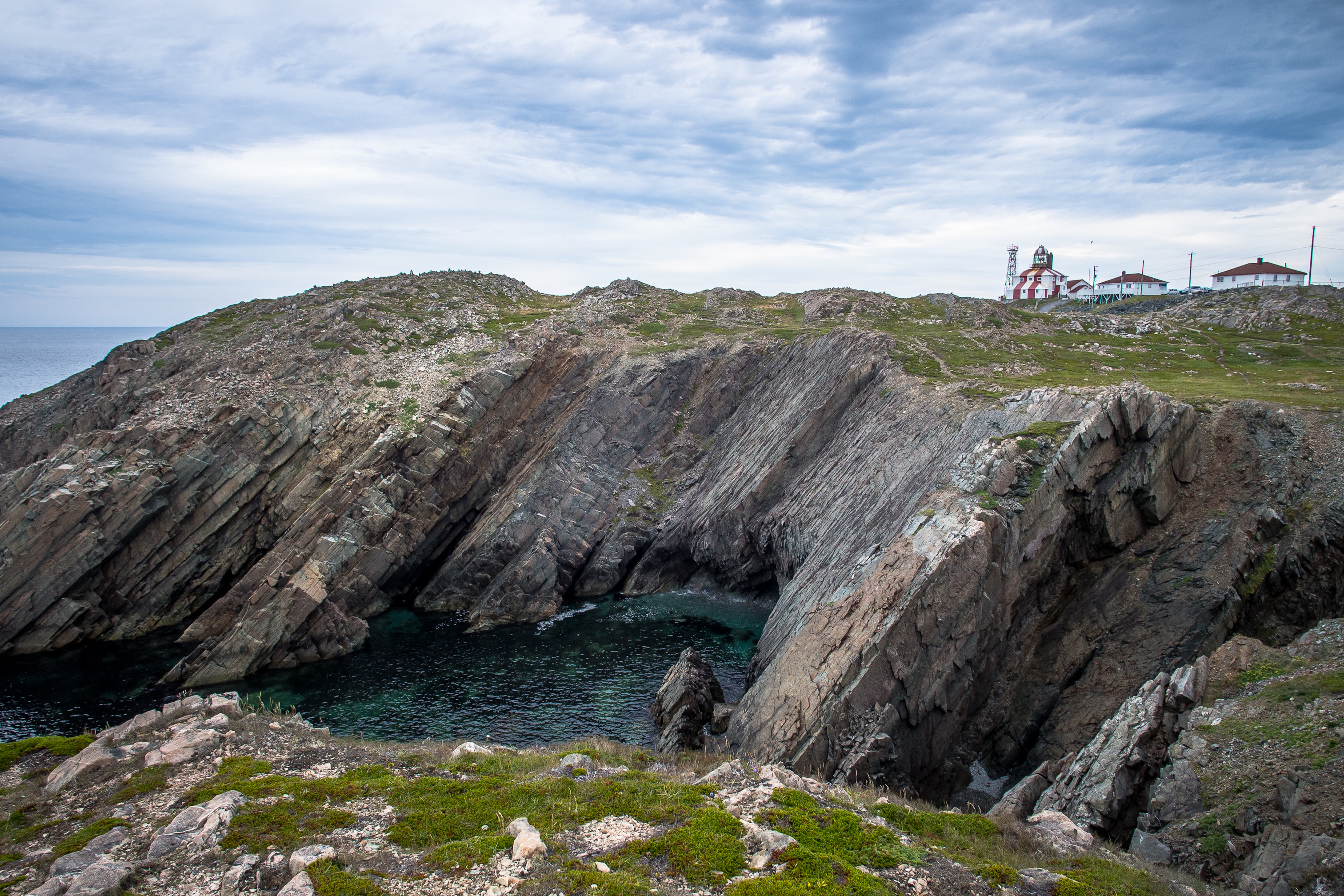
Cliffs and lighthouse

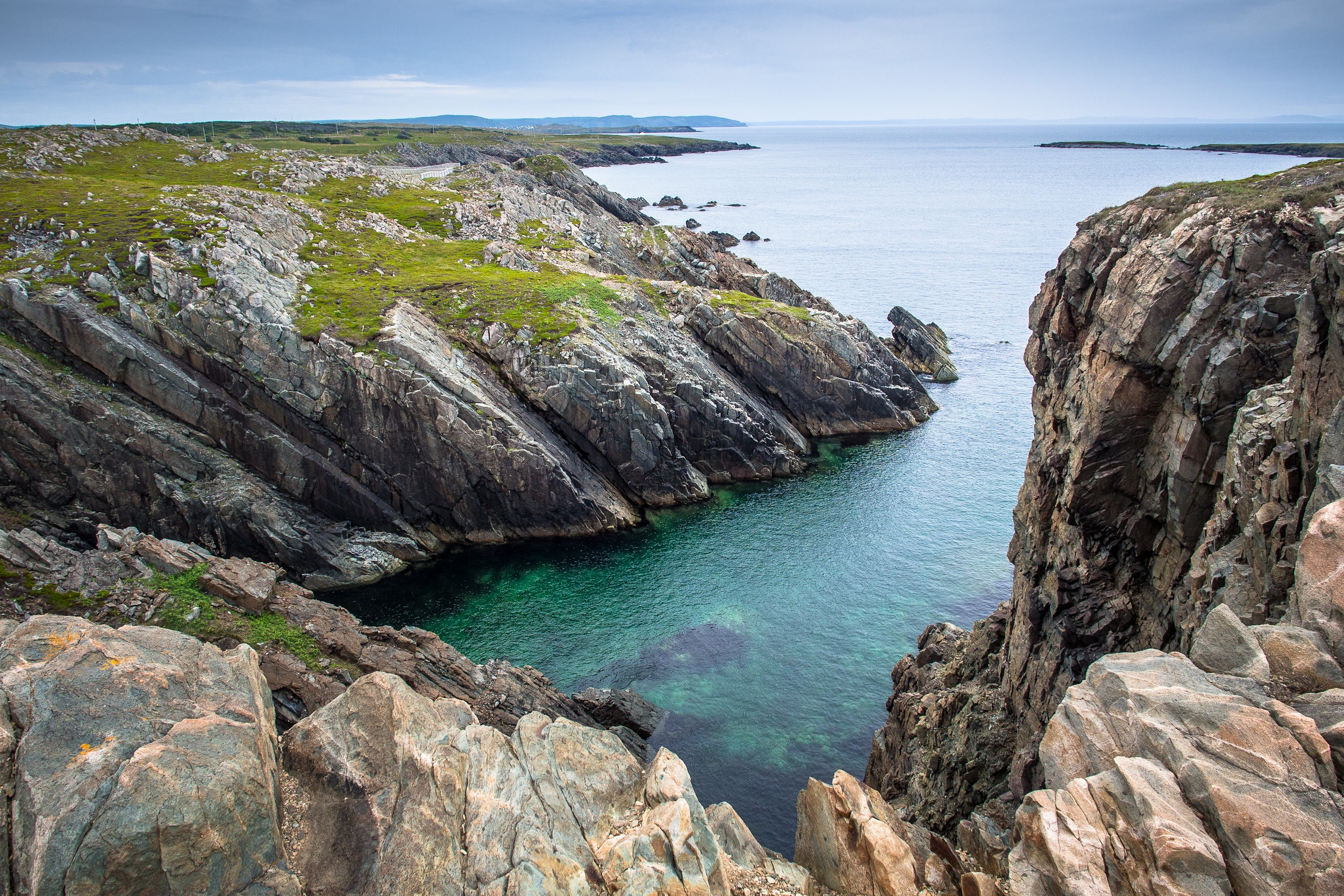
Cliff perspective

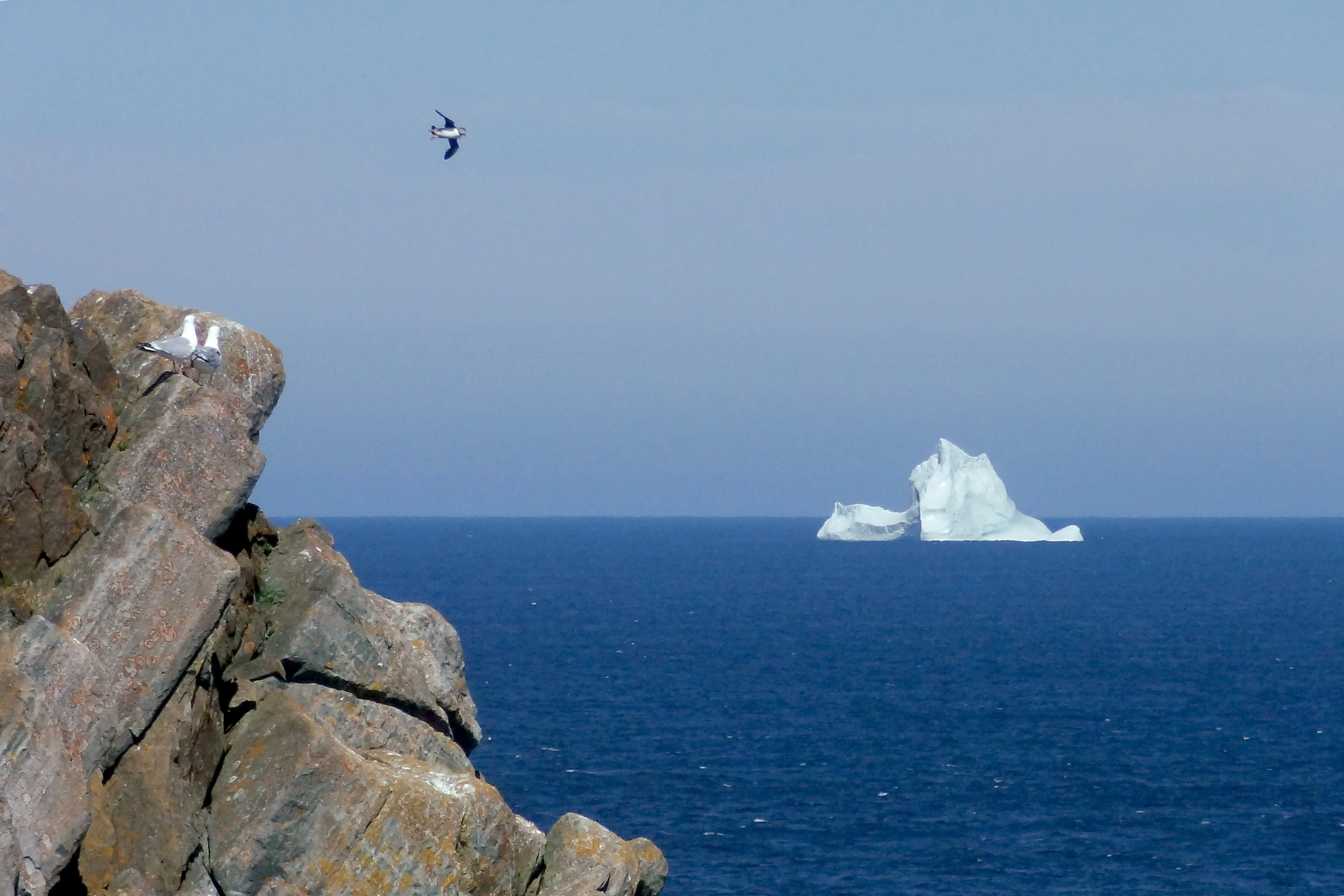
An iceberg and tip of puffin colony, seen from the Cape

== See also ==
- List of lighthouses in Canada
- Statue of John Cabot (St. John's, Newfoundland and Labrador)
