= Cape Bonavista Light =

Lighthouse on Newfoundland, Canada

Cape Bonavista
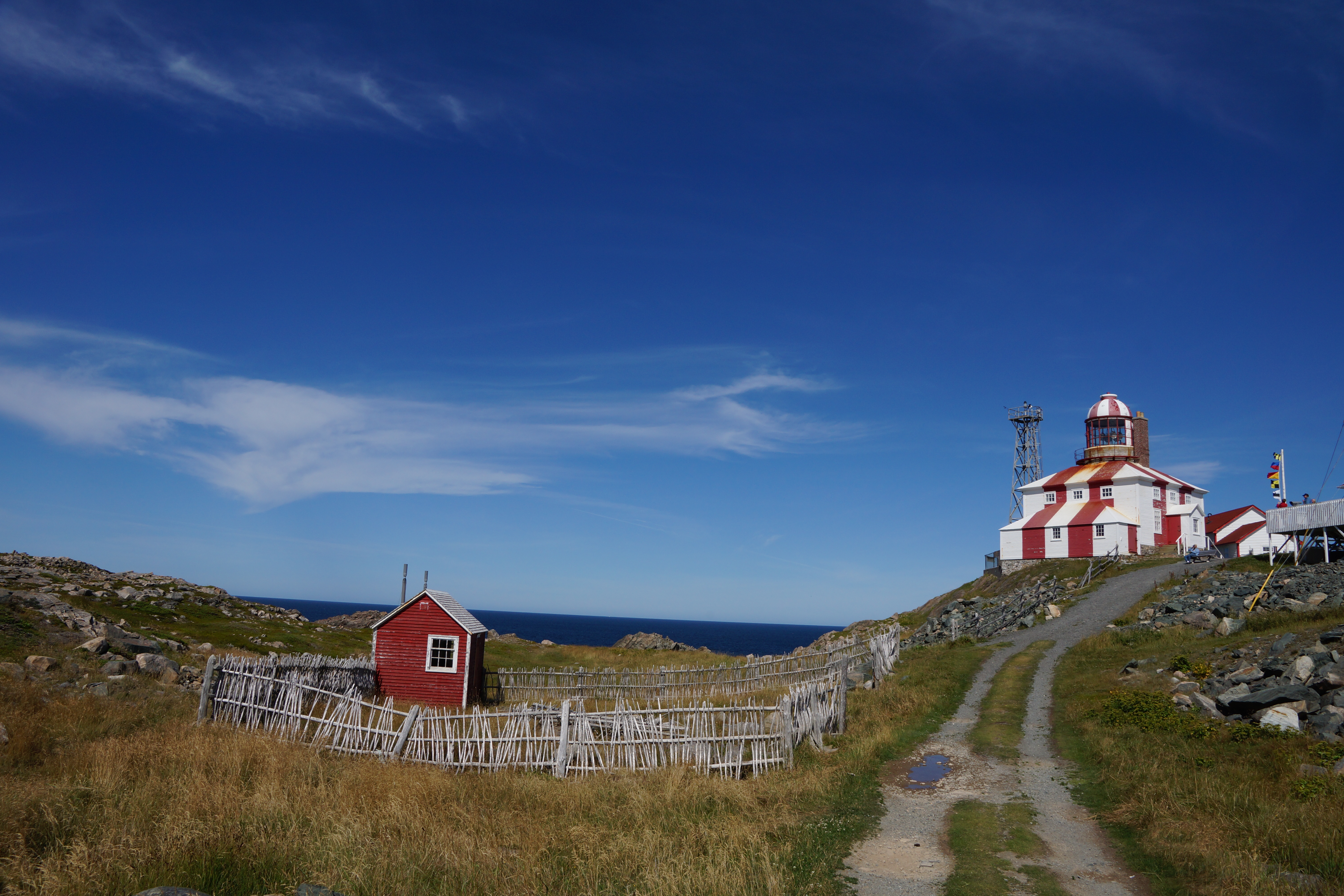
- Cape Bonavista Lighthouse
- Location: Bonavista Peninsula; Newfoundland; Newfoundland and Labrador; Canada
- Coordinates: 48°42′05.0″N 53°05′07.1″W

Tower
- Constructed: 1843 (first)
- Construction: limestone tower (first) steel skeletal tower (current)
- Height: 11 metres (36 ft) (first); 12 metres (39 ft) (current)
- Shape: cylindrical tower with balcony and lantern on the roof of a two-story wooden keeper's house (first) square pyramidal tower (current)
- Markings: tower and lantern with vertical red and white stripes (first)
- Operator: Bonavista Lighthouse Provincial Historic Site
- Heritage: provincial historic site
- Fog signal: blast every 30s.

Light
- First lit: 1966 (current)
- Deactivated: 1966 (first)
- Focal height: 51 metres (167 ft) (current)
- Characteristic: Fl W 10s.

Cape Bonavista Light is a lighthouse located on Cape Bonavista, Newfoundland. The lighthouse, which operated from 1843 until 1962, is now a provincial museum, containing an exhibition about life in a lighthouse during the 1870s.

== History ==
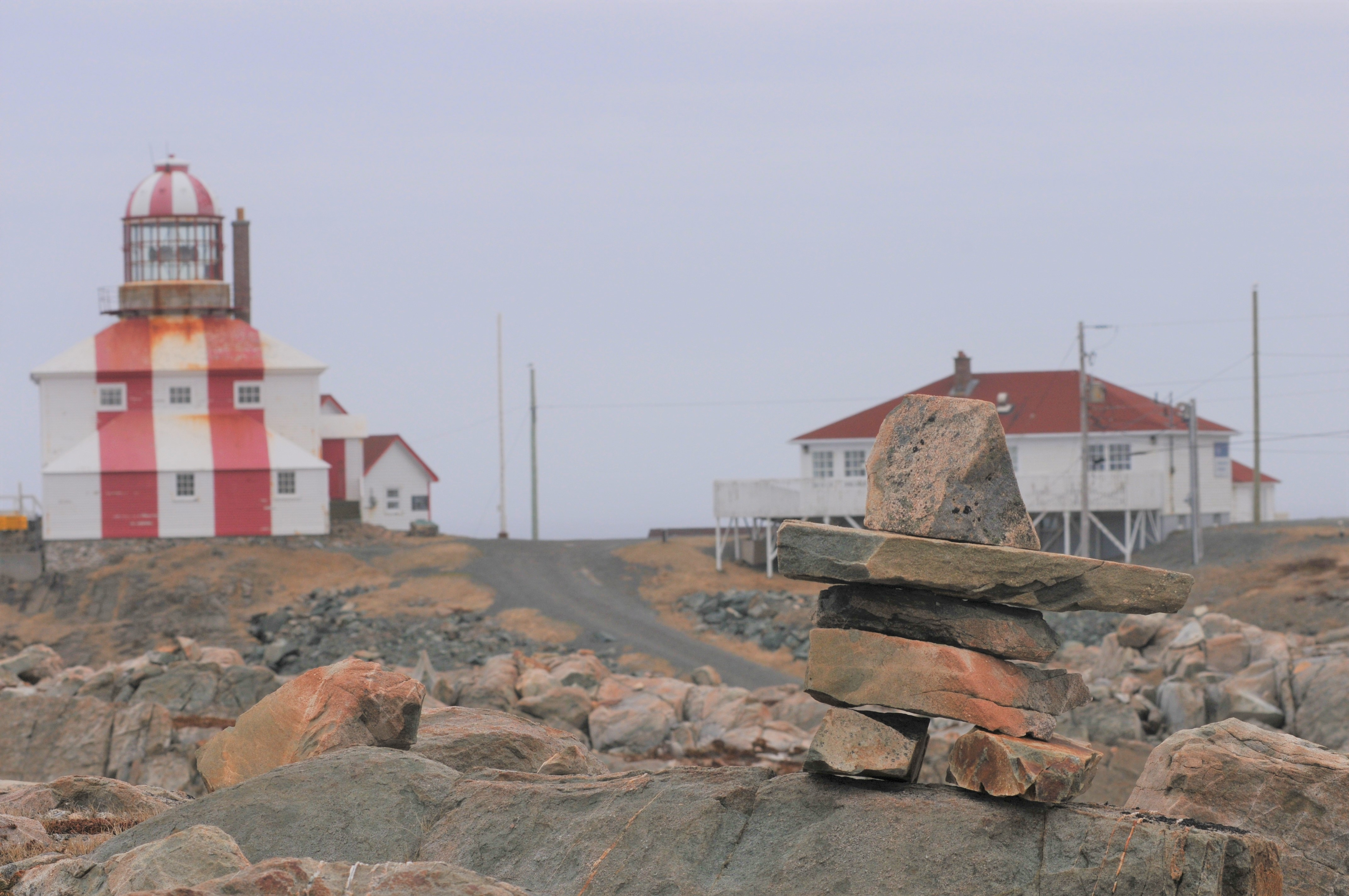
Bonavista lighthouse with inuksuk in front, 2013

The lighthouse at Cape Bonavista was built between 1841 and 1843 to mark the entrances to Bonavista and Trinity bays and to aid mariners headed for Labrador. It is the fourth-oldest lighthouse in Newfoundland. The two-story wooden building is constructed around a masonry tower surmounted by a lantern.

The first lamps and reflectors came from the Bell Rock Lighthouse in Scotland. This apparatus was later replaced by a catoptric system from the Isle of May in Scotland, first installed in Newfoundland in 1850 by Robert Oke at the Cape Pine lighthouse, later moved to the Harbour Grace Island lighthouse, and finally to Cape Bonavista. Both the historic light mechanisms that ended up at Cape Bonavista, the one from the Bell Rock and the one from Isle of May were installed by Robert Oke, who served as the first Chief Inspector of the Newfoundland Lighthouse Service. In 1962 the lighthouse went dark, replaced by an electric light on a nearby steel skeleton tower.

In the 1970s the lighthouse was restored for use as a museum by the provincial government. The building contains furniture and artifacts representing the pre-1870 period. The rare catoptrics lighting system, made up of Argand oil lamps and parabolic mirrors of polished silver, is on display. Exhibits on local industry include coopering, fishing, whaling and sealing, as well as the ecological history of Cape Bonavista.

On August 3, 2001, a disastrous electrical storm struck Cape Bonavista. As lightning struck repeatedly all around the cape, the lighthouse tower was hit three times, igniting a fire. Quick action by the fire department prevented more severe damage.

== See also ==
- List of lighthouses in Newfoundland and Labrador
- List of lighthouses in Canada
