= Southern Bay =

Settlement in Newfoundland, Canada

Coordinates: 48.391°N 53.634°W

Location of Southern Bay in Newfoundland and Labrador

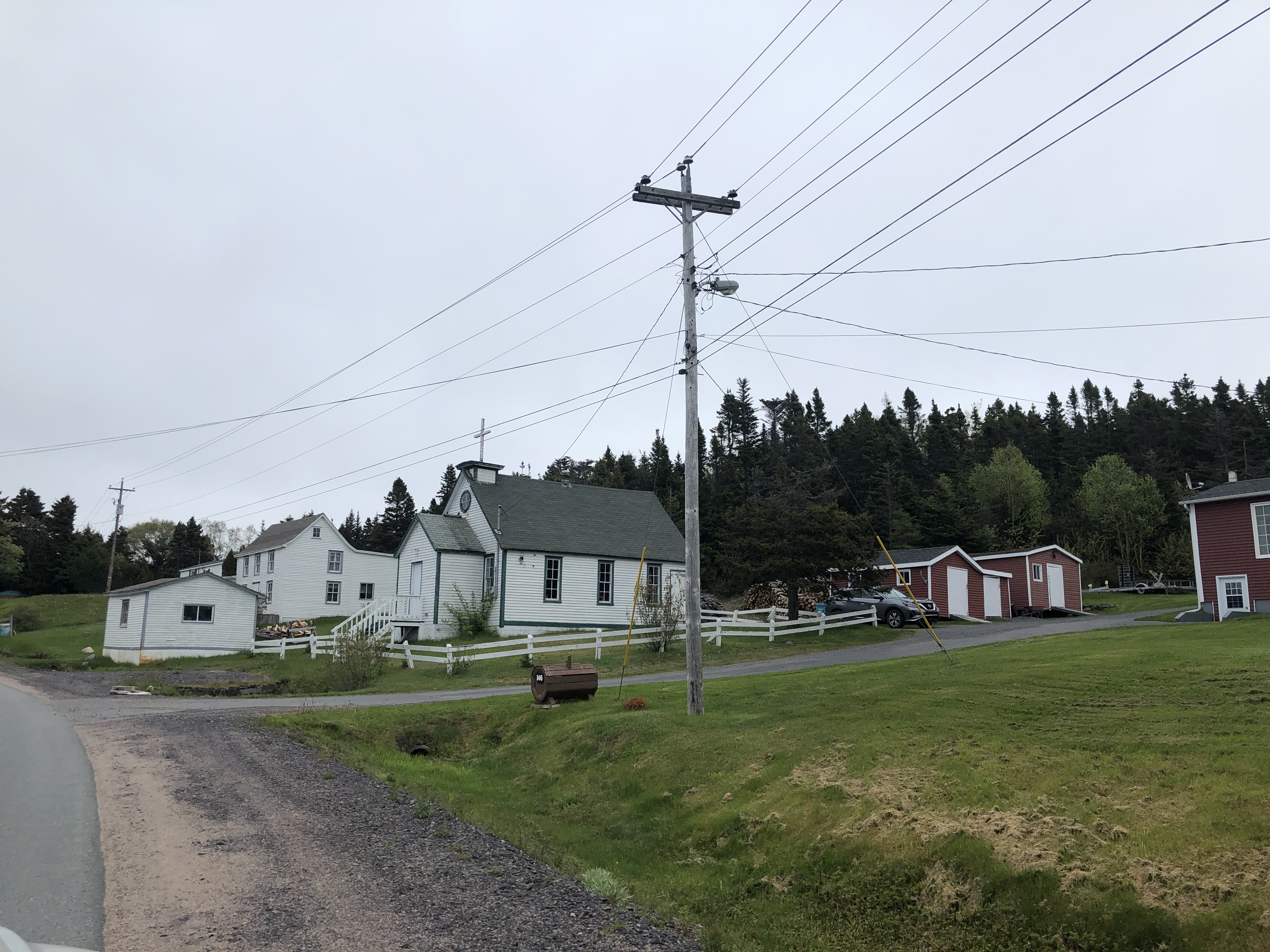

Southern Bay is a settlement in the Canadian province of Newfoundland and Labrador. It is part of the local service district of Summerville-Princeton-Southern Bay.
