= Newman's Cove =

Local service district and designated place in Newfoundland and Labrador, Canada

Coordinates: 48.588°N 53.191°W

Location of Newman's Cove in Newfoundland and Labrador

Newman's Cove is a local service district and designated place in the Canadian province of Newfoundland and Labrador.

== Geography ==
Newman's Cove is in Newfoundland within Subdivision G of Division No. 7.

== Demographics ==
As a designated place in the 2016 Census of Population conducted by Statistics Canada, Newman's Cove recorded a population of 150 living in 67 of its 80 total private dwellings, a change of -3.8% from its 2011 population of 156. With a land area of 3.55 km^{2} (1.37 sq mi), it had a population density of 42.3/km^{2} (109.4/sq mi) in 2016.

== Government ==
Newman's Cove is a local service district (LSD) that is governed by a committee responsible for the provision of certain services to the community. The chair of the LSD committee is Woodrow Power.

== See also ==
- List of communities in Newfoundland and Labrador
- List of designated places in Newfoundland and Labrador
- List of local service districts in Newfoundland and Labrador
