= Summerville, Newfoundland and Labrador =

Settlement in Newfoundland, Canada

Coordinates: 48.450°N 53.556°W

Location of Summerville in Newfoundland and Labrador

Summerville is a settlement in Newfoundland and Labrador. It is part of the local service district of Summerville-Princeton-Southern Bay.

It was previously known as Indian Arm; the first Waymaster was Edward Humby in 1891.

== See also ==
- List of communities in Newfoundland and Labrador
