= Duntara =

- Town
- Location of Duntara in Newfoundland
- Coordinates: 48°35′10″N 53°22′52″W
- Country: Canada
- Province: Newfoundland and Labrador
- Incorporated: October 21 1961
- Disincorporated: September 1 2017

Population (2021)
  - Total: 36
- Time zone: UTC-3:30 (Newfoundland Time)
  - Summer (DST): UTC-2:30 (Newfoundland Daylight)
- Area code: 709

Duntara is a town located north west of Catalina, Newfoundland and Labrador. Duntara became an Incorporated Community on October 21, 1961 and was Disincorporated on September 1, 2017.

== Demographics ==
In the 2021 Census of Population conducted by Statistics Canada, Duntara had a population of 36 living in 18 of its 47 total private dwellings, a change of 20% from its 2016 population of 30. With a land area of 17.64 km^{2} (6.81 sq mi), it had a population density of 2.0/km^{2} (5.3/sq mi) in 2021.

Historical populations Duntara, NL
Year	Pop.	±%
1891	237	—
1935	165	−30.4%
1945	149	−9.7%
1951	151	+1.3%
1956	161	+6.6%
1961	181	+12.4%
1966	195	+7.7%
1971	149	−23.6%
1976	138	−7.4%
1981	124	−10.1%
1986	119	−4.0%
1991	102	−14.3%
1996	85	−16.7%
2001	73	−14.1%
2006	72	−1.4%
2011	46	−36.1%
2016	30	−34.8%
2021	36	+20.0%

== See also ==
- List of cities and towns in Newfoundland and Labrador
