= King's Cove =

- Town
- Motto: Athens of the North
- Interactive map of King's Cove
- Coordinates: 48°34′00″N 53°20′10″W
- Country: Canada
- Province: Newfoundland and Labrador

Government
  - MHA: Craig Pardy

Population (2021)
  - Total: 75
- Time zone: UTC-3:30 (Newfoundland Time)
  - Summer (DST): UTC-2:30 (Newfoundland Daylight)
- Area code: 709
- Highways: Route 235
- King's Cove Head Lighthouse
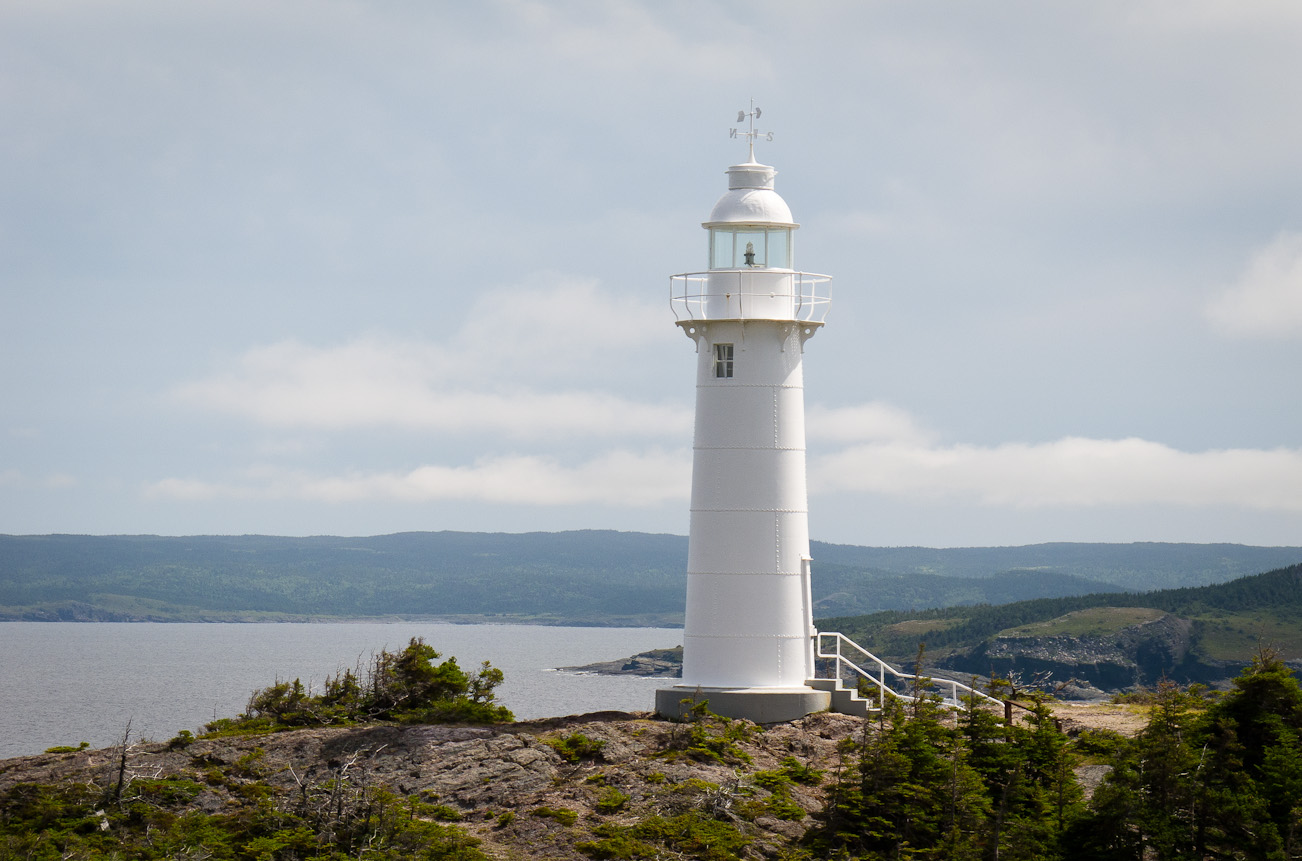
- King's Cove Head Lighthouse in 2010
- Constructed: 1893
- Foundation: concrete base
- Construction: cast iron tower
- Height: 8 m (26 ft)
- Shape: cylindrical tower with balcony and lantern
- Markings: white tower and lantern
- Power source: solar power
- Operator: Canadian Coast Guard
- Heritage: recognized federal heritage building of Canada
- Focal height: 54 m (177 ft)
- Range: 5 nmi (9.3 km; 5.8 mi)
- Characteristic: Fl W 4s

King's Cove is a town in the Canadian province of Newfoundland and Labrador. The post office was established in 1851. Its founder was James Aylward from Keels, who was born in Ireland in county Cork in 1690. His direct descendants still live in the community.

== Demographics ==
In the 2021 Census of Population conducted by Statistics Canada, King's Cove had a population of 75 living in 45 of its 85 total private dwellings, a change of −16.7% from its 2016 population of 90. With a land area of 21.44 km^{2} (8.28 sq mi), it had a population density of 3.5/km^{2} (9.1/sq mi) in 2021.

Historical populations
Year	Pop.	±%
1951	253	—
1956	262	+3.6%
1961	201	−23.3%
1966	213	+6.0%
1971	271	+27.2%
1976	239	−11.8%
1981	253	+5.9%
1986	255	+0.8%
1991	214	−16.1%
1996	175	−18.2%
2001	159	−9.1%
2006	121	−23.9%
2011	111	−8.3%
2016	90	−18.9%
2021	75	−16.7%

== See also ==
- List of lighthouses in Canada
- List of cities and towns in Newfoundland and Labrador
- Royal eponyms in Canada
