= Trinity North =

Former provincial electoral district in Newfoundland and Labrador, Canada

Newfoundland and Labrador electoral district
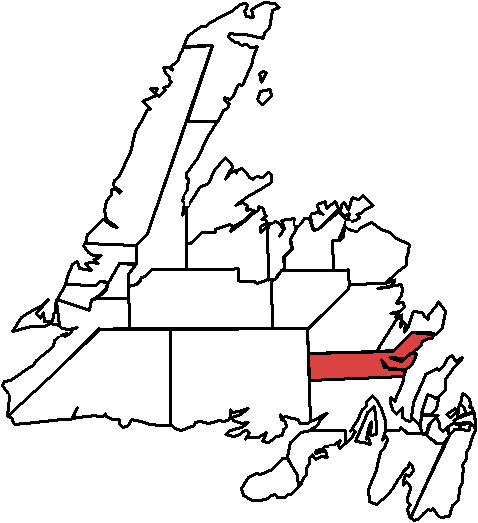
- Trinity North in relation to other districts in Newfoundland

Defunct provincial electoral district
- Legislature: Newfoundland and Labrador House of Assembly
- District created: 1972
- First contested: 1972
- Last contested: 2011

Demographics
- Population (2006): 11,495
- Electors (2011): 8,278

Trinity North was a provincial electoral district for the House of Assembly of Newfoundland and Labrador, Canada. In 2011, there were 8,278 eligible voters living within the district.

The riding was abolished in 2015 into Terra Nova and Bonavista.

When it was abolished, the riding included many of the communities on the north side of Trinity Bay. Clarenville was the major service centre. While the fishery has been depleted, tourism in the Trinity area has been growing steadily.

Includes the communities of Adeytown, Aspey Brook, Brittania, Burgoynes Cove, Butter Cove, Caplin Cove, Champney's East, Champney's West, Clarenville, Clifton, Deep Bight, Dunfield, Elliott's Cove, English Harbour, George's Brook, Gin Cove, Goose Cove, Gooseberry Cove, Harcourt, Hatchet Cove, Hickman's Harbour, Hillview, Hodge's Cove, Ivany's Cove, Lady Cove, Little Heart's Ease, Lockston, Long Beach, Lower Lance Cove, Monroe, Milton, Old Bonaventure, New Bonaventure, Petley, Queen's Cove, Port Rexton, Random Heights, Robinson's Bight, St. Jones Within, Shoal Harbour, Snook's Harbour, Southport, Thorburn Lake, Trinity, Trinity East, Trouty, Waterville, and Weybridge.

== Members of the House of Assembly ==
The district has elected the following members of the House of Assembly:

| Member | Party | Term |
|---|---|---|
| Ross Wiseman | Progressive Conservative | 2001–2015 |
| Ross Wiseman | Liberal | 2000–2001 |
| Doug Oldford | Liberal | 1991–2000 |
| Barry Hynes | Progressive Conservative | 1989–1991 |
| Charlie Brett | Progressive Conservative | 1972–1989 |
| Uriah F. Strickland | Liberal | 1971–1972 |
| C. Maxwell Lane | Liberal | 1966–1971 |
| Arthur S. Mifflin | Liberal | 1956–1966 |
| Samuel J. Hefferton | Liberal | 1949–1956 |

== Election results ==
2011 Newfoundland and Labrador general election
| Party | Candidate | Votes | % | ±% |
|---|---|---|---|---|
| Progressive Conservative | Ross Wiseman | 3,211 | 66.87 | – |
| NDP | Vanessa Wiseman | 1,247 | 25.97 | |
| Liberal | Brad Cabana | 344 | 7.16 | |

2007 Newfoundland and Labrador general election
| Party | Candidate | Votes | % | ±% |
|---|---|---|---|---|
| Progressive Conservative | Ross Wiseman | 3,939 | 82.15 | – |
| Liberal | Kathryn Small | 609 | 12.70 | |
| NDP | Janet Stringer | 247 | 5.15 | |

2003 Newfoundland and Labrador general election
| Party | Candidate | Votes | % | ±% |
|---|---|---|---|---|
| Progressive Conservative | Ross Wiseman | 4,126 | 67.57 | – |
| Liberal | Kathryn Small | 1,640 | 26.85 | |
| NDP | Howard W. Duffett | 340 | 5.56 | |

By-election: April 25, 2000 On the resignation of Doug Oldford
| Party | Candidate | Votes | % | ±% |
|---|---|---|---|---|
| Liberal | Ross Wiseman | 2,654 | 48.12 | |
| Progressive Conservative | Bruce Stagg | 2,463 | 44.66 | – |
| NDP | Perry Feltham | 398 | 7.21 | |

1999 Newfoundland and Labrador general election
| Party | Candidate | Votes | % | ±% |
|---|---|---|---|---|
| Liberal | Doug Olford | 2,979 | 50.6 | |
| Progressive Conservative | Sheila Kelly-Blackmore | 2,183 | 37.1 | – |
| NDP | Dan Corbett | 714 | 12.1 | |

== See also ==
- List of Newfoundland and Labrador provincial electoral districts
- Canadian provincial electoral districts
