= Milton =

Milton may refer to:

== People and fictional characters ==
- Milton (surname), a list of people with that surname
  - John Milton (1608–1674), English poet
- Milton (given name)
- Milton (footballer), Brazilian footballer Milton Luiz de Souza Filho (born 1961)
- Milton, stage name of Marc Rosenthal, American singer-songwriter

== Places ==
=== Australia ===
- Milton, New South Wales, a village
- Milton, Queensland, a suburb of Brisbane
  - Milton Reach, a reach of the Brisbane River

=== Canada ===
- Milton, Newfoundland and Labrador
- Milton, Nova Scotia in the Region of Queens Municipality
- Milton, Ontario, a town
- Milton (federal electoral district), Ontario
  - Milton (provincial electoral district), Ontario
- Milton, a prior name of Beaverton, Ontario, a community
- Rural Municipality of Milton No. 292, Saskatchewan

=== New Zealand ===
- Milton, New Zealand

=== United Kingdom ===
==== England ====
- Milton, Cambridgeshire, a village north of Cambridge
- Milton, Brampton, Cumbria
- Milton, Milnthorpe, Cumbria
- Milton, Derbyshire, a village in south Derbyshire
- Milton, Dorset, a former town
- Milton on Stour, Dorset
- Milton, a former hamlet in Westcliff-on-Sea, Essex
  - Milton (Southend-on-Sea ward)
- Milton, Nottinghamshire
- Milton, Cherwell, Oxfordshire
- Milton, Vale of White Horse, Oxfordshire
  - Milton Park, a business park
- Milton, Portsmouth, Hampshire, a residential area of Portsmouth
- Milton, Somerset, hamlet in Ash parish, South Somerset
- Milton, North Somerset, an area of Weston-super-Mare, Somerset
- Milton, Staffordshire, an area of Stoke-on-Trent
- Milton, Wiltshire, a hamlet

==== Scotland ====
- Milton (South Uist), in the Outer Hebrides
- Milton of Strathbogie, former name of Huntly, Aberdeenshire
- Milton of Finavon, Angus
- Milton of Ogilvie, Angus
- Milton of Campsie, East Dunbartonshire
- Milton, Easter Ross, a village near Kildary, Easter Ross, Highland
- Milton of Balgonie, Fife
- Milton, Glasgow, a district of the city
- Milton, Glenurquhart, a village near Drumnadrochit, Highland
- Milton, Stirling, a hamlet near Aberfoyle
- Milton of Buchanan, Stirling
- Milton, West Dunbartonshire, a village near Dumbarton

==== Wales ====
- Milton, Pembrokeshire, a village in Pembrokeshire

=== United States ===
- Milton, California, an unincorporated community
- Milton, Delaware, a town
- Milton, Florida, a city
- Milton, Georgia, a city
- Milton County, Georgia, a former county
- Milton, Illinois, a village
- Milton, Indiana, a town
- Milton, Ohio County, Indiana, an unincorporated community
- Milton, Iowa, a city
- Milton, Kansas, a census-designated place
- Milton, Kentucky, a home rule-class city
- Milton, Louisiana, an unincorporated community and census-designated place
- Milton, Maine, an unorganized territory (township)
- Milton, Massachusetts, a town
- Milton, Atchison County, Missouri, a former hamlet
- Milton, Kansas City, Missouri, a neighborhood of Kansas City
- Milton, Randolph County, Missouri, an unincorporated community
- Milton, New Hampshire, a town
  - Milton (CDP), New Hampshire, a census-designated place within the town
- Milton, Saratoga County, New York, a town
  - Milton (CDP), Saratoga County, New York, a census-designated place within the town
- Milton, Ulster County, New York, a census-designated place and hamlet
- Milton, North Carolina, a city
- Milton, North Dakota, a city
- Milton, Pennsylvania, a borough
  - Milton State Park
- Milton, Tennessee, an unincorporated community
- Milton, Texas, an unincorporated community
- Milton, Vermont, a town
  - Milton (CDP), Vermont, a census-designated place within the town
- Milton, Albemarle County, Virginia, an unincorporated community
- Milton, Charles City County, Virginia, an unincorporated community
- Milltown, Virginia, formerly named Milton, an unincorporated community
- Milton, Washington, a city
- Milton, West Virginia, a town
- Milton, Wisconsin, a city
  - Milton, Rock County, Wisconsin, a town surrounding the city
- Milton, Buffalo County, Wisconsin, a town
- Milton Township (disambiguation)

=== Outer space ===
- Milton (crater), a crater on Mercury

== Arts and entertainment ==
=== Music ===
- Milton (opera), by Gaspare Spontini
- Milton (1970 album), by Milton Nascimento
- Milton (1977 album), by Milton Nascimento
- Milton, a 2006 album by Marc Rosenthal

=== Other arts and entertainment ===
- Milton: A Poem in Two Books, an epic poem by William Blake
- Milton (cartoon), a series of cartoons for Saturday Night Live and the film Office Space
- Milton (game), an electronic game made in 1980 by Milton Bradley

== Schools ==
- Milton Academy, a preparatory school in Milton, Massachusetts
- Milton College, a former private college in Milton, Wisconsin
- Milton High School (disambiguation)
- Milton State School, Milton, City of Brisbane, Queensland, Australia

== Sports ==
- Milton United F.C., a football club in Milton, Oxfordshire, England
- Milton Menace, a Junior "A" ice hockey team from Milton, Ontario, Canada

== Transportation ==
- Milton railway station (disambiguation)
  - Milton Road, Brisbane, Australia
- Milton line, a commuter train line in Milton, Ontario, Canada
- Milton GO Station, Milton, Ontario, Canada

== Other uses ==
- Hurricane Milton, a tropical cyclone that affected the Yucatán Peninsula and Florida in October 2024
- Milton (horse), a show jumping horse ridden by John Whitaker
- Milton Corporation, an Australian investment company
- Milton Barracks, a former military installation at Milton Road in Gravesend, Kent, England
- Milton sterilizing fluid, a brand name of sterilising compound for purposes including baby bottles
- Milton the Toaster, an advertising mascot for Pop-Tarts
- Viscount Milton and Baron Milton, extinct titles

== See also ==
- Milton Lake (disambiguation)
- Milton Loch, a freshwater loch in Dumfries and Galloway, Scotland
- Milton Pond, a body of water the border between Strafford County, New Hampshire, and York County, Maine
- Milton Blockhouse, an artillery fortification constructed c. 1539 at Milton-next-Gravesend, Kent, England
- Chapel Milton, Derbyshire
- Great Milton, Oxfordshire
- Little Milton, Oxfordshire
- Milltown (disambiguation)
- Milton Abbas, Dorset
- Milton Bryan, Bedfordshire
- Milton Center, Ohio
- Milton Clevedon, Somerset
- Milton Combe, Devon
- Milton Damerel, Devon
- Milton Ernest, Bedfordshire
- Milton-Freewater, Oregon
- Milton Green, Cheshire, a hamlet near Handley, Cheshire
- Milton Hall, an estate near Peterborough, Cambridgeshire
- Milton Keynes, Buckinghamshire
- Milton Lilbourne, Wiltshire
- Milton Malsor, Northamptonshire
- Milton-next-Gravesend, an ecclesiastical parish in the north-west of Kent, England
- Milton Regis, Kent
- Milton-under-Wychwood, Oxfordshire
- Milton Street, a hamlet in Long Man parish, East Sussex
- New Milton, Hampshire
- New Milton, West Virginia
- West Milton, Ohio
