= Newfoundland and Labrador Route 231 =

Highway in Newfoundland and Labrador, Canada

Route 231
- Random Island Road

Route information
- Maintained by Newfoundland and Labrador Department of Transportation and Infrastructure
- Length: 33.6 km (20.9 mi)

Major junctions
- West end: Route 230A in Milton
- East end: Random Island Road in Petley

Location
- Country: Canada
- Province: Newfoundland and Labrador

Highway system
- Highways in Newfoundland and Labrador
| ← Route 230A | → Route 232 |

Route 231, also known as Random Island Road, is a 33.6-kilometre-long (20.9 mi) east–west highway in the Canadian province of Newfoundland and Labrador. It serves as the only road connection between Newfoundland and Random Island.

== Route description ==
Route 231 begins on Newfoundland in Milton at an intersection with Route 230A (Old Bonavista Highway). It immediately leaves town and heads east to cross the Hefferton Causeway onto Random Island. The highway now passes along the southern coastline of the island as it goes through the communities of Random Heights and Elliott's Cove, where Route 231 intersects with a spur road leading to Snook's Harbour. Route 231 now passes through Weybridge, Lady Cove, and Robinsons Bight before turning more inland and having an intersection with a spur road leading to Hickman's Harbour. The highway passes northeast through hilly terrain for a few kilometres before passing through Britannia, where it has a Y-Intersection with a spur road leading into town and Lower Lance Cove. Route 231 now curves back to the northwest to pass through Middle Lance Cove and Petley before coming to an end at the edge of the asphalt pavement just outside the latter community, with Random Island Road continuing west as a gravel road.

== Major intersections ==
| Location | km | mi | Destinations | Notes |
|---|---|---|---|---|
| Milton | 0.0 | 0.0 | Route 230A (Old Bonavista Highway) to Route 1 (TCH) – Clarenville, George's Brook, Bonavista | Western terminus |
| Elliott's Cove | 9.2 | 5.7 | Snook's Harbour Road (Route 231-10) - Snook's Harbour, Aspey Brook | |
| | 25.6 | 15.9 | Hickman's Harbour Road (Route 231-16) - Hickman's Harbour | |
| Britannia | 29.2 | 18.1 | Main Road (Route 231-19) - Downtown Britannia, Lower Lance Cove | Fork in the road |
| Petley | 33.6 | 20.9 | Random Island Road | End of provincial maintenance; eastern terminus; road continues as Random Island Road |
1.000 mi = 1.609 km; 1.000 km = 0.621 mi
