= Newfoundland and Labrador Route 232 =

Highway in Newfoundland and Labrador, Canada

Route 232
- Smith Sound Road

Route information
- Maintained by Newfoundland and Labrador Department of Transportation and Infrastructure
- Length: 26 km (16 mi)

Major junctions
- West end: Route 230A near George's Brook
- East end: Burgoyne's Cove

Location
- Country: Canada
- Province: Newfoundland and Labrador

Highway system
- Highways in Newfoundland and Labrador
← Route 231	→ Route 233

Route 232 is a provincial highway in the province of Newfoundland and Labrador with the western terminus at George's Brook, where it intersects with Route 230A (Old Bonavista Highway). The eastern terminus is at the community of Burgoyne's Cove, where the road reaches a cul-de-sac. It roughly follows the north shore of Smith Sound for the entire route.

It is a paved two-lane highway for the entire length, with 50 km/h speed limits in communities, 60 km/h in the space between communities.

== Route description ==
Route 232 begins in George's Brook at an intersection with Route 230A (Old Bonavista Highway) just north of downtown. It heads east through neighbourhoods to cross over a river and leave town to pass through rural areas. The highway now begins winding its way southeast along the coastline as it passes through the communities of Barton and Harcourt. Route 232 turns northeast as it passes through Gin Cove, Monroe, and Waterville before heading more inland and due eastward through hilly terrain for several kilometres. The highway rejoins the coastline as it heads south through Clifton before making a sharp curve to the east to enter Burgoyne's Cove. Route 232 passes straight through town, passing to the north of the harbour and having an intersection with a local road leading to Burnt Harbour (Brickyard) and Nut Cove. The highway comes to a dead end at the western edge of town at a cul-de-sac.

== Major intersections ==
Location	km	mi	Destinations	Notes
George's Brook	0.0	0.0	Route 230A (Old Bonavista Highway) – Clarenville, Catalina, Bonavista	Western terminus
Burgoyne's Cove	26	16	Dead End	Eastern terminus
1.000 mi = 1.609 km; 1.000 km = 0.621 mi
