= Milton (given name) =

Milton is an English, masculine given name. It is transferred from the eponomous surname, itself a toponymic surname from one of the many places so called, a large number of which get their name from Old English mylen ("mill") or middel ("middle") and tun ("settlement").

== People ==
For people commonly called Milt, see Milt (given name)

=== A ===
- Milton A. Abernethy (1911–1991), American journalist and magazine editor
- Milton Acorn (1923–1986), Canadian poet, writer, and playwright
- Milton Abramowitz (1915–1958), American mathematician
- Milton Adolphus (1913–1988), American pianist and composer
- Milton Ager (1893–1979), American composer
- Milton Aguilar (born 1984), Mexican footballer
- Milton Alegre (born 1991), Argentine-Chilean footballer
- Milton Alexander (1796–1856), American general
- Milton Otho Alexander (1923–2013), American politician
- Milton Allen (1888–1981), Governor of Saint Christopher-Nevis-Anguilla
- Milton Allimadi, Ugandan-American journalist and writer
- Milton Angier (1899–1967), American javelin thrower
- Milton Antony (1789–1839), American physician
- Milton Taylor Armstrong (1887–1957), Canadian politician
- Milton Aronowitz (1891–1981), American football coach
- Milton Atkinson (1926-2008), Australian rugby league footballer
- Milton Avery (1885–1965), American modern painter

=== B ===
- Milton Babbitt (1916–2011), American composer
- Milton Bagby, American voice actor and author
- Milton Balkany (born 1946), American Orthodox rabbi and convicted extortionist
- Milton Barney (born 1963), American football player
- Mílton Barros (born 1984), Angolan basketball player
- Milton Bearden (born 1940), retired Central Intelligence Agency officer, author, and film consultant
- Milton Becerra (born 1951), Venezuelan artist
- Milton Earl Beebe (1840–1923), American architect
- Milton Bell (born 1970), American basketball player
- Milton Berle (1908–2002), American comedian
- Milton Blanco (born 1984), American soccer player
- Milton Bradley (1836–1911), American business magnate, game pioneer and publisher
- Milton Bradley (baseball) (born 1978), American baseball player
- Milton Brown (1903–1936), American band leader and vocalist
- Milton Brown (politician) (1804–1883), American politician

=== C ===
- Milton Campbell (born 1976), American track and field athlete
- Milton A. Candler (1837–1909), American lawyer, Confederate officer, and politician
- Milton Caniff (1907–1988), American cartoonist
- Milton Caraglio (born 1988), Argentine footballer
- Milton Coleman (born 1946), American journalist
- Milton Crenchaw (1919–2015), American aviator
- Milton Cross (1897–1975), American radio announcer

=== D ===
- Milton Delugg (1918–2015), American jazz accordionist, bandleader and composer
- Milton Diamond (1934–2024), American sexologist
- Milton Dick (born 1972), Australian politician
- Milton Doyle (born 1993), American basketball player
- Milton Dube, Nauruan politician

=== E ===
- Milton Ellenby, American bridge player
- Milton H. Erickson (1901–1980), American psychiatrist
- Milton Esterow (1928–2025), American art journalist
- Milton Estes (1914–1963), American country singer-songwriter and musician
- Milton Ezrati, American economist

=== F ===
- Milton Fisher (1917–2001), American attorney and investment banker
- Milton Flores (1974–2003), Honduran footballer
- Milton Francisco (born 1963), Brazilian high jumper
- Milton Friedman (1912–2006), American economist
- Milton Frome (1909–1989), American actor

=== G ===
- Milton Galamison (1923–1988), American Presbyterian minister and civil rights activist
- Milton C. Garber (1867–1948), American politician
- Milton Gästrin (born 2007), Swedish ice hockey player
- Milton Glaser (1929–2020), American graphic designer
- Milton Glick (1937–2011), American educator
- Milton Goldstein (film executive) (1926–2015), American film executive
- Milton Goldstein (photographer) (1915–2000), American photographer
- Milton Goode (born 1960), American high jumper
- Milton Green, (1913–2005), American hurdler
- Milton Fowler Gregg (1892–1978), Canadian military officer

=== H ===
- Milton Hardaway (1954–2008), American football player
- Milton Hay (1817–1893), American lawyer and politician
- Milton S. Hershey (1857–1945), American chocolatier and philanthropist
- Milton Prince Higgins (1842–1912), American industrialist and educator
- Milton B. Hine (1828–1881), American politician
- Milton Huddart (1960–2015), English rugby league footballer

=== I ===
- Milton Inniss, Barbados diplomat

=== J ===
- Milton Jackson, stage name of Scottish DJ and record producer Barry Christie
- R. Milton Johnson, American businessman and philanthropist
- Milton Jones (born 1964), English comedian

=== K ===
- Milton Kerker (1920–2016), American physical chemist
- Milton Y. Kidd (1826–1884), American politician from Maryland
- Milton Koerner (1910–1980), American politician

=== L ===
- Milton Ladd, American politician
- Milton Lamb (1909–2006), Australian rules footballer
- Milton De Lano (1844–1922), American politician
- Milton Latham (1827–1882), American politician
- Milton Lazarus (1898/99–1955), American dramatist
- Milton Leathers (1908–2000), American football player
- Milton A. Lee (1949–1968), United States Army soldier posthumously awarded the Medal of Honor
- Milton C. Lee (born 1960), American judge, chief judge of the Superior Court of the District of Columbia
- Milton L. Lee, American professor of chemistry

=== M ===
- Milton Gummo Marx (1893–1977), American actor, comedian, and theatrical agent
- Milton McCrory (born 1962), American professional boxer
- Milton McGriggs, American football player
- Milton Mallawarachchi (1944–1998), Sri Lankan Sinhala vocalist
- Milton E. Miles (1900–1961), American U.S. Navy admiral
- Milton Morris (1924–2019), Australian politician

=== N ===
- Milton Nascimento (born 1942), Brazilian singer-songwriter

=== O ===
- Milton Obote (1925–2005), Ugandan politician

=== P ===
- J. A. Milton Perera (1929–1991), Sri Lankan Sinhala playback singer and composer
- Milton Prell (1905–1974), American hotel and casino developer
- Milton Jesús Puerto (born 1969), Honduran politician
- Milton D. Purdy (1866–1937), American federal judge

=== Q ===
- Milton Quon (1913–2019), American animator, artist, and actor

=== R ===
- Milton Ernest Ricketts (1913–1942), American naval officer
- Milton A. Romjue (1874–1968), American politician
- Milton Romney (1899–1975), American football player
- Milton A. Rothman (1919–2001), American nuclear physicist

=== S ===
- Milton Selzer (1918–2006) American stage, film, and television actor
- Milton Shulman (1913–2004), Canadian-British critic and author
- Milton Dean Slaughter, American theoretical physicist
- Milton Stapp (1792–1869), American politician

=== T ===
- Milton Terris (1915–2002), Public health physician and epidemiologist
- Milton Terry (1840-1914), American theologian and minister
- Milton Thaiday (born 1980), Australian Rugby player
- Milton Orville Thompson (1926–1993), American aviator
- Milton Born With A Tooth (1957–2019), Canadian activist
- Milton Treppo (born 1996), Argentine footballer
- Milton Trinidad (born 1939), Uruguayan footballer and coach
- Milton Tucker (1921–1986), Barbadian sports shooter

=== U ===
- Milton Urner (1839–1926), American politician

=== V ===
- Milton Valente (born 1998), Angolan basketball player
- Milton Valenzuela (born 1998), Argentine footballer
- Milton Vieira (born 1978), Brazilian mixed martial artist
- Milton Viera (born 1946), Uruguayan footballer
- Milton Viorst (1930–2022), American journalist

=== W ===
- Milton Wainwright (born 1950), British microbiologist
- Milton Wakefield, Canadian politician
- Milton Waldman (1895–1976), American author and publisher
- Milton Waldor (1924–1975), American politician
- Milton Wallace (1912–1995), Canadian long-distance runner
- Milton Wai-yiu Wan (born 1952), Chinese theological scholar
- Milton P. Webster (1887–1965), American trade unionist
- Milton Weinstein, American health scientist
- Milton H. Welling (1876–1947), American politician
- Milton Wells (1829–1906), American military general
- Milton H. West (1888–1948), American politician
- Milton Wexler (1908–2007), American psychoanalyst
- Milton C. Whitaker (1870–1963), American chemist
- Milton White (1902–1978), Australian rules footballer
- Milton Whiting (1922–2010), Australian politician
- Milton Williams (born 1999), American football player
- Milton Windler (born 1932), NASA flight director
- Milton A. Wolf (1924–2005), American diplomat, investment banker and real estate developer
- Milton R. Wolf (born 1971), American physician
- Milton Wolff (1915–2008), American writer and veteran
- Milton Wolsky (1916–1981), American painter and illustrator
- Milton Wong (1940–2011), Canadian businessman, financier and philanthropist
- Milton L. Wood (1922–2015), American Episcopalian bishop
- Milton Woods, African-American actor
- Milton Work (1864–1934), American whist and bridge writer
- Milton Wright (academic) (1903–1972), American academic
- Milton Wright (American football), American football player
- Milton Wright (bishop) (1828–1917), father of the Wright brothers
- Milton Wynants (born 1972), Uruguayan cyclist
- Milton Wynn (born 1978), American football player

=== Y ===
- Milton Yakus (1917–1980), American songwriter
- Milton J. Yarberry (1849–1883), American Old West lawman
- Milton Young (1897–1983), American politician

=== Z ===
- Milton Zaagman (1926–2012), American politician
- Milton Zaitlin (1927–2016), American plant pathologist

== Fictional characters ==
- Milton (DC Extended Universe), in The Suicide Squad
- Milton Dyer (Ninjago), in the animated television series Ninjago
- Milton Krest, a villain in the James Bond short story "The Hildebrand Rarity"
- Milton Mamet, in the television series The Walking Dead

== See also ==
- Milton (disambiguation)
- Milton (surname)
- Milt (given name), a list of people, nearly all with the real given name Milton
