= Milltown =

Milltown may refer to:

- Mill town, a settlement that developed around one or more mills

== Places ==
=== Canada ===
- Milltown, New Brunswick
- Milltown, Newfoundland and Labrador
- Milltown, Ontario

=== Ireland ===
- Milltown, Ballymore, a townland in Ballymore civil parish, barony of Rathconrath, County Westmeath
- Milltown, Churchtown, a townland in Churchtown civil parish, barony of Rathconrath, County Westmeath
- Milltown, County Cavan, a small village
- Milltown, County Kerry, a small town
- Milltown, County Galway, a small village
- Milltown, County Kildare, a village
- Milltown, Dublin, a suburb of Dublin
- Milltown, Faughalstown, a townland in Faughalstown civil parish, barony of Fore, County Westmeath
- Milltown Malbay, a town in County Clare
- Milltown, Pass of Kilbride, a townland in Pass of Kilbride civil parish, barony of Fartullagh, County Westmeath
- Milltown, Rathconrath, a townland in Rathconrath civil parish, barony of Rathconrath, County Westmeath

=== New Zealand ===
- Milltown, Canterbury, a locality in Selwyn District
- Milltown, West Coast, a locality in Westland District

=== United Kingdom ===
==== England ====
- Milltown, Cardinham, a location in Cardinham parish, Cornwall
- Milltown, Lanlivery, a hamlet near Lostwithiel, Cornwall
- Milltown, Derbyshire, a village

==== Northern Ireland ====
- Milltown, County Antrim, a village in Northern Ireland
- Milltown, County Down, a townland in County Down, Northern Ireland
- Milltown, County Tyrone, four townlands in County Tyrone, Northern Ireland

==== Scotland ====
- Milltown of Rothiemay, a small inland village within the Moray council area, Scotland

=== United States ===
- Milltown, Alabama
- Milltown, Arkansas
- Milltown, Delaware
- Milltown, Georgia
- Milltown, Indiana
- Milltown, Kentucky
- Milltown, Maine
- Milltown, Missouri
- Milltown, Montana
- Milltown, Hunterdon County, New Jersey
- Milltown, New Jersey, in Middlesex County
- Milltown, New York
- Milltown, South Dakota
- Milltown, Tennessee
- Milltown, Virginia
- Milltown, West Virginia
- Milltown, Wisconsin, a village within the town of Milltown
- Milltown (town), Wisconsin

== Sports ==
- Milltown GAC, Gaelic Athletic Association club in Galway, Ireland
- Milltown (stadium), home ground of Warrenpoint Town F.C., Northern Ireland
- Glenmalure Park or Milltown, the former home of Shamrock Rovers F.C., Dublin, Ireland

== Other uses ==
- HMCS Milltown, a 1942 Bangor-class minesweeper
- Milltown Cemetery, a cemetery in Belfast, Northern Ireland
- Milltown Reservoir Superfund Site, a site on the Clark Fork River Basin in Montana
- Milltown River, in County Westmeath, Ireland
- Earl of Milltown, title in the Peerage of Ireland
- RAF Milltown, a former Royal Air Force station near Elgin, Scotland

== See also ==
- Miltown, a brand name for the mild tranquilizer meprobamate
- Milton (disambiguation)
- Milltown, Ireland (disambiguation)
- Milltown GAA (disambiguation), sports clubs that share the name 'Milltown GAA'
