= George's Brook-Milton, Newfoundland and Labrador =

George's Brook-Milton
- Town
- Town of George's Brook-Milton
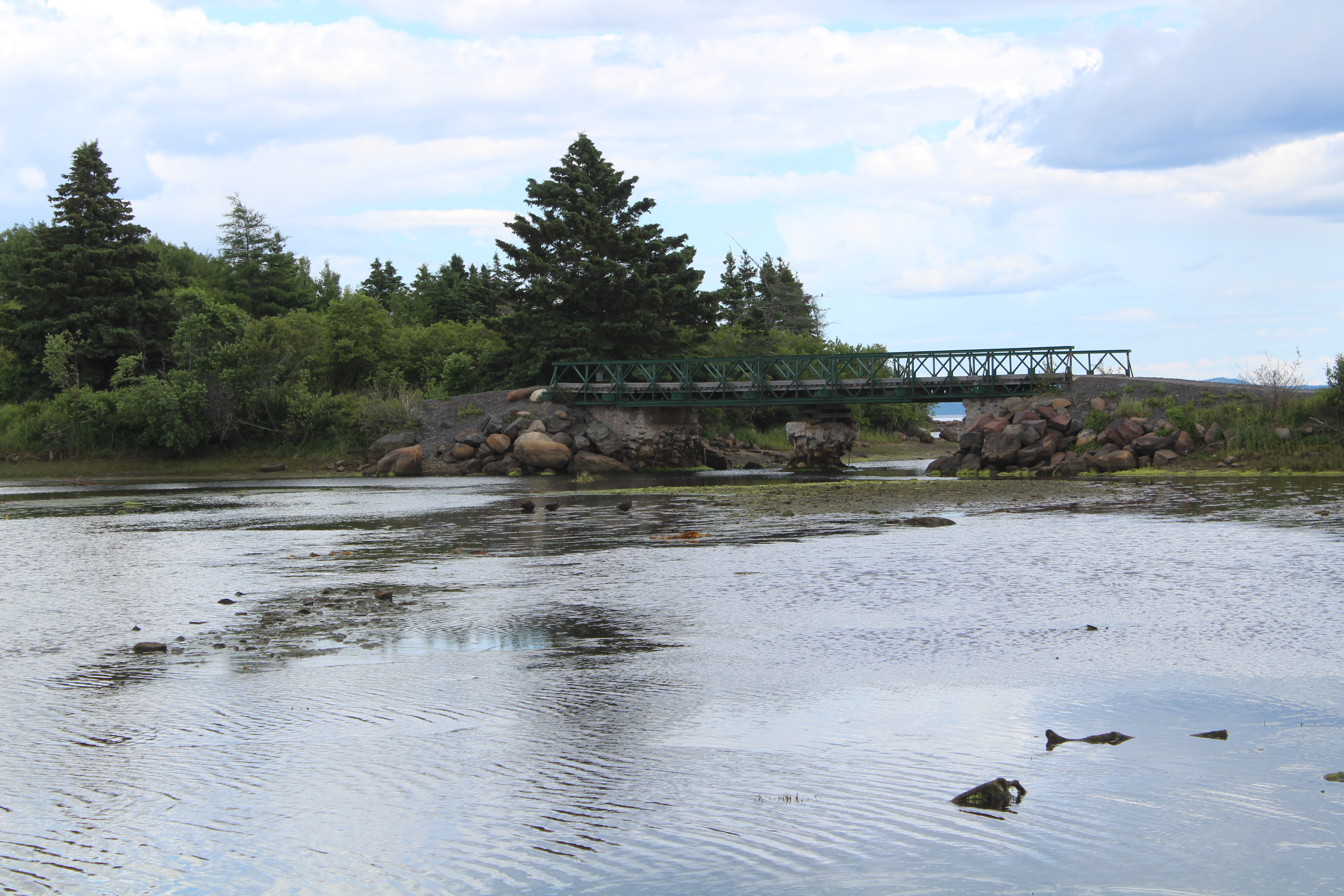
- Bridge over George's Brook

- Location of George's Brook-Milton in Newfoundland
- Coordinates: 48°13′00″N 53°57′43″W
- Country: Canada
- Province: Newfoundland and Labrador
- Town: May 8, 2018

Population (2021)
  - Total: 719
- Time zone: UTC-3:30 (Newfoundland Time)
  - Summer (DST): UTC-2:30 (Newfoundland Daylight)
- Area code: 709
- Highways: Route 230A; Route 231
- Website: Official website

George's Brook-Milton is a town on Smith Sound, Trinity Bay, in the Canadian province of Newfoundland and Labrador. It was incorporated as a town in 2018 from the neighbouring unincorporated communities of George's Brook and Milton.

== History ==
In 2017, residents of the neighbouring communities of George's Brook and Milton voted in favour of joining together to incorporate as a town. The Town of George's Brook-Milton was officially incorporated by the provincial government on May 8, 2018.

== See also ==
- List of cities and towns in Newfoundland and Labrador
