= Newfoundland and Labrador Route 230A =

Highway in Newfoundland and Labrador

Route 230A
- Old Bonavista Highway

Route information
- Auxiliary route of Route 230
- Maintained by Newfoundland and Labrador Department of Transportation and Infrastructure
- Length: 16.2 km (10.1 mi)

Major junctions
- South end: Route 1 (TCH) in Clarenville
- Route 231 in Milton; Route 232 in George's Brook
- North end: Route 230 at Clarenville Airport

Location
- Country: Canada
- Province: Newfoundland and Labrador

Highway system
- Highways in Newfoundland and Labrador
← Route 230	→ Route 231

Route 230A, also known as Old Bonavista Highway, is a 16.2-kilometre-long (10.1 mi) alternate route of Route 230 at the southwestern corner of the Bonavista Peninsula on the island of Newfoundland. It represents the former route of Route 230 through Clarenville, Milton, and George's Brook.

== Route description ==
Route 230A begins at an intersection with the Trans-Canada Highway (Route 1) in Clarenville and heads east through a major business district along Manitoba Drive. It then merges onto Memorial Drive and passes through downtown and some neighbourhoods before becoming Balbo Drive as it crosses over the Shoal Harbour Causeway Bridge to pass through Shoal Harbour. The highway then leaves the Clarenville town limits and winds its way along the coast to pass through Milton, where it has an intersection with Route 231 (Random Island Road), and George's Brook, where it has an intersection with Route 232 (Smith Sound Road). Route 230A now leaves the coast and passes northeast through rural areas before coming to an end at an intersection with Route 230 (Bonavista Peninsula Highway) directly beside of Clarenville Airport.

== Major intersections ==
Location	km	mi	Destinations	Notes
Clarenville	0.0	0.0	Route 1 (TCH) – St. John's, Gander, Grand Falls-Windsor	Southern terminus
Milton	8.2	5.1	Route 231 east (Random Island Road) – Random Island	Western terminus of Route 231
George's Brook	12.3	7.6	Route 232 east (Smith Sound Road) – Harcourt, Burgoyne's Cove	Western terminus of Route 232
	16.2	10.1	Route 230 (Bonavista Peninsula Highway/Discovery Trail) to Route 1 (TCH) – Catalina, Bonavista	Northern terminus; provides access to Clarenville Airport (not a scheduled destination)
1.000 mi = 1.609 km; 1.000 km = 0.621 mi
