= Little Milton (disambiguation) =

Little Milton (1934–2005) was an American R&B/blues singer and guitarist.

Little Milton may also refer to:

- Little Milton, Oxfordshire, a village in England
- Little Milton, Wollongong, a historic house in New South Wales, Australia

== See also ==
- Milton (disambiguation)
- Little Mitton, Lancashire, England
