= Kalidas (disambiguation) =

Kalidasa (4th–5th century CE) was an Indian Classical Sanskrit poet (kavi) and playwright.

Kalidas or Kalidasa may also refer to:

== Films ==
=== About the poet ===
- Mahakavi Kalidas (1942 film)
- Kalidas (film), 1931 film
- Mahakavi Kalidas (1966 film)
- Kaviratna Kalidasa, 1983 film
- Mahakavi Kalidasa, 1955 film
- Mahakavi Kalidasu, 1960 film

==== Others ====
- Kalidasu, 2008 Indian Telugu-language film
- Kaalidas, 2019 Indian Tamil-language crime thriller film
  - Kaalidas 2, its 2026 sequel

== People with the name ==
- Kalidás Barreto (1932–2020), Portuguese accountant and unionist
- Kalidas Roy (1889–1975), Bengali poet
- Kalidas Shetty, Indian food scientist
- Kalidas Shrestha (1923–2016), Nepali artist
- Preeya Kalidas (born 1980), British singer
- R. Kalidas (died 2005), Indian politician

== Other uses ==
- Kālidāsā (crater), a crater on Mercury
- Kalidasa, a genus of planthoppers
- Kalidas Samman, an Indian civilian award
- Kalidasa Akademi

== See also ==
- Kalida, Ohio
