= Weybridge (disambiguation) =

Weybridge is a town in Surrey, England.

Weybridge may also refer to:

- Weybridge, Newfoundland and Labrador
- Weybridge, Vermont

== See also ==
- weighbridge
- Wadebridge
