= Milton Goldstein =

Milton Goldstein may refer to:

- Milton Goldstein (film executive) (born 1926), American film executive
- Milton Goldstein (photographer) (1915–2000), Jewish American author and photographer
