= Milton, Virginia =

Milton, Virginia may refer to the following American unincorporated communities:

- Milton, Albemarle County, Virginia
- Milton, Charles City County, Virginia
- Milltown, Virginia, formerly named Milton
