= Milton station =

Milton station or Milton railway station may refer to:

== Australia ==
- Milton railway station, Brisbane in Brisbane, Queensland

== Canada ==
- Milton GO Station in Milton, Ontario

== United Kingdom ==
=== England ===
- Milton railway station (Staffordshire) in Milton, Staffordshire
- Milton Halt railway station in Milton, Oxfordshire
- Milton Range Halt railway station in Gravesend, Kent
- Milton Regis Halt railway station in Milton Regis, Kent
- Milton Road Halt railway station in Gravesend, Kent
- New Milton railway station in New Milton, Hampshire
- Weston Milton railway station in Milton and Locking Castle, Weston-super-Mare, North Somerset
- Brampton railway station (Cumbria) near the village of Milton, previously known as Milton station

=== Scotland ===
- Milton of Crathes railway station in Milton of Crathes

== United States ==
- Milton station (MBTA) in Milton, Massachusetts
- Milton station (New York) in Milton, New York

== See also ==
- Milton Keynes railway station (disambiguation)
