= Hauptmann (crater) =

Crater on Mercury

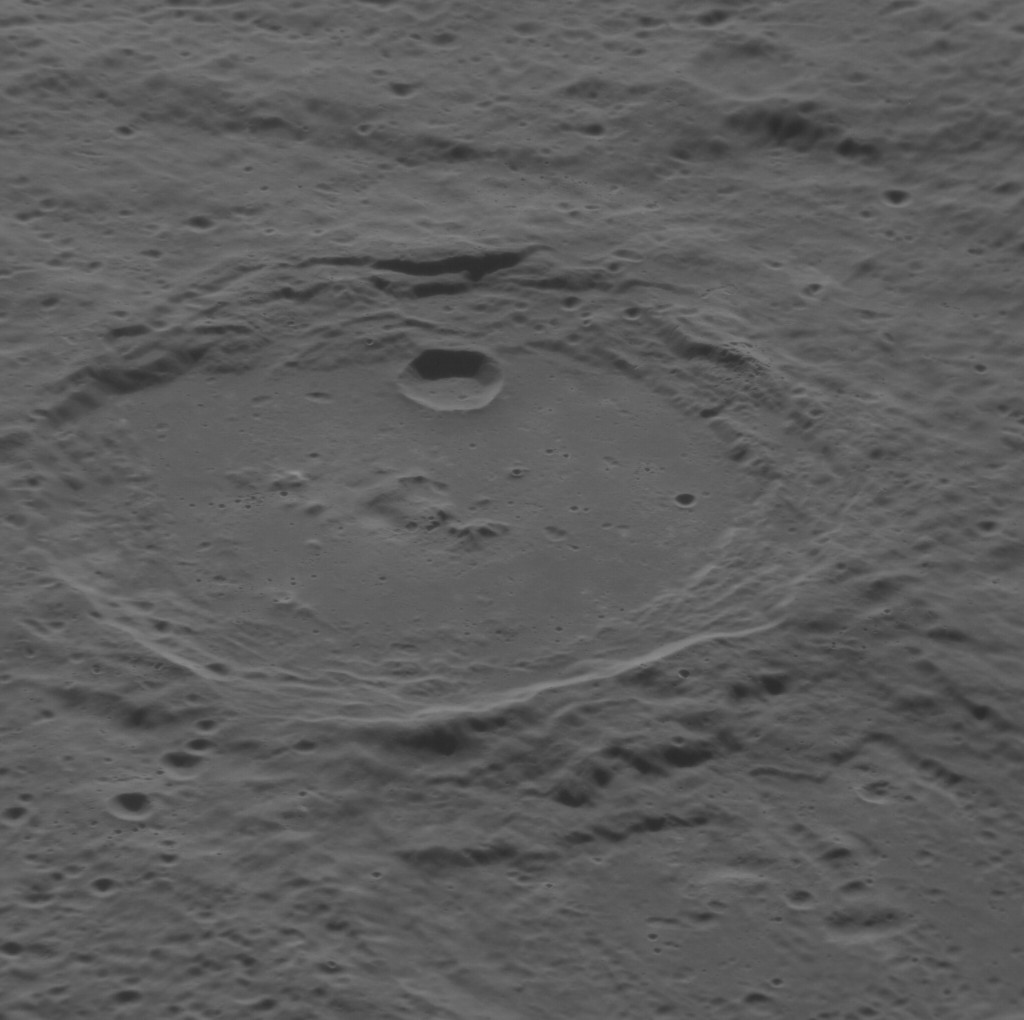
- Oblique MESSENGER NAC image of Hauptmann
- Feature type: Central-peak impact crater
- Location: Michelangelo quadrangle, Mercury
- Coordinates: 23.70°S 180.41°W
- Diameter: 118.0 km (73.3 mi)
- Eponym: Gerhart Hauptmann

Hauptmann is a crater on Mercury. It has a diameter of 118 kilometers. Its name was adopted by the International Astronomical Union (IAU) in 1985. Hauptmann is named for the German playwright Gerhart Hauptmann, who lived from 1862 to 1946.

There is an irregular depression next to the central peak complex of Hauptmann, making it a pit-floor crater. The depression may be caused by explosive volcanism.

Hauptmann is south of Kālidāsā crater and northwest of Milton. A dark spot of low reflectance material (LRM) is present to the southwest of Hauptmann.

== Views ==
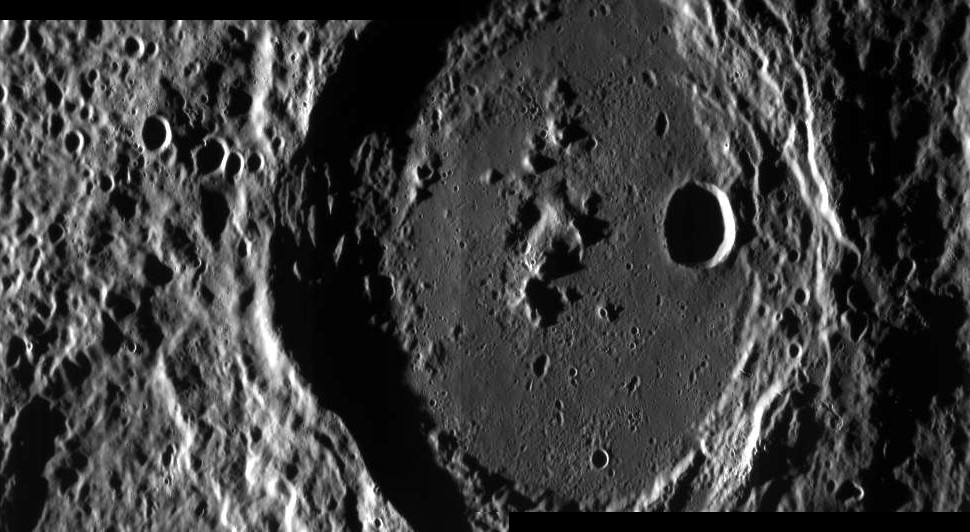
Hauptmann at low sun angle

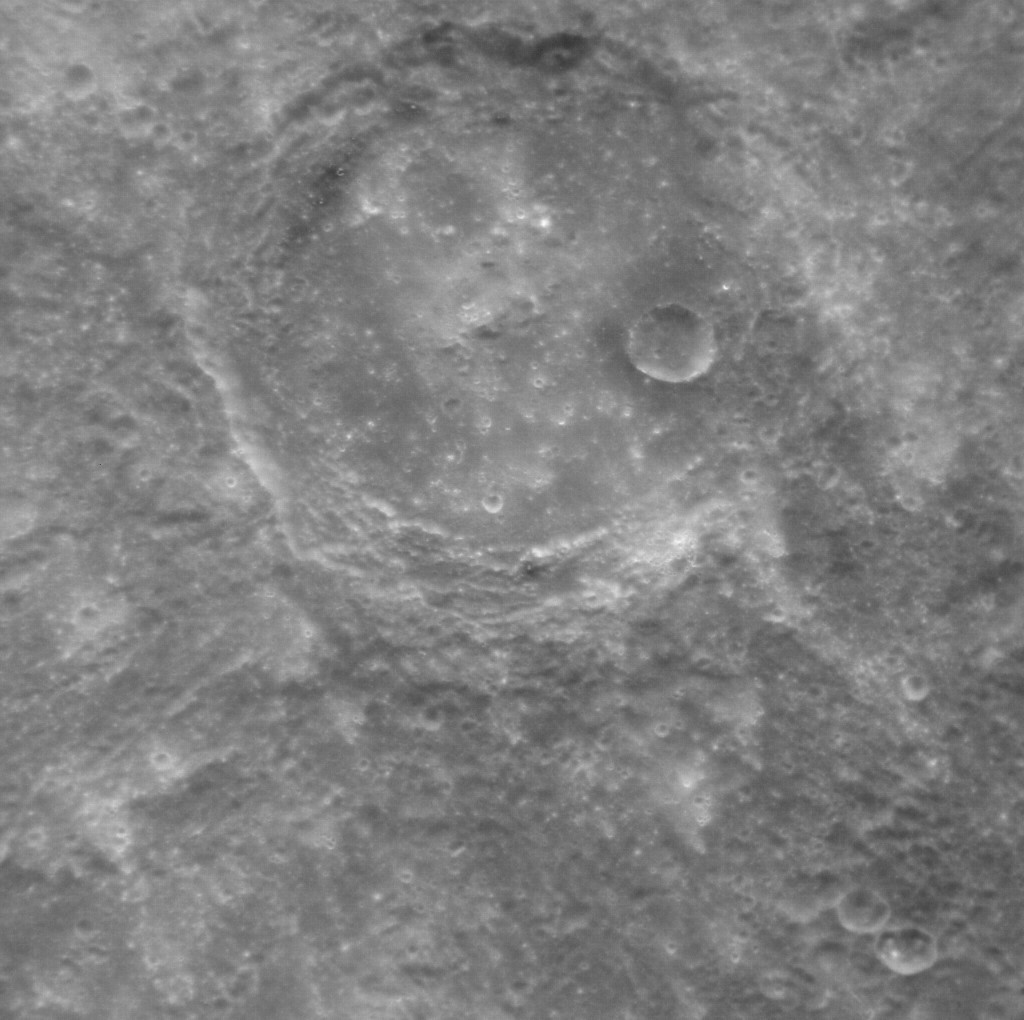
Hauptmann at a high sun angle, showing differences in albedo

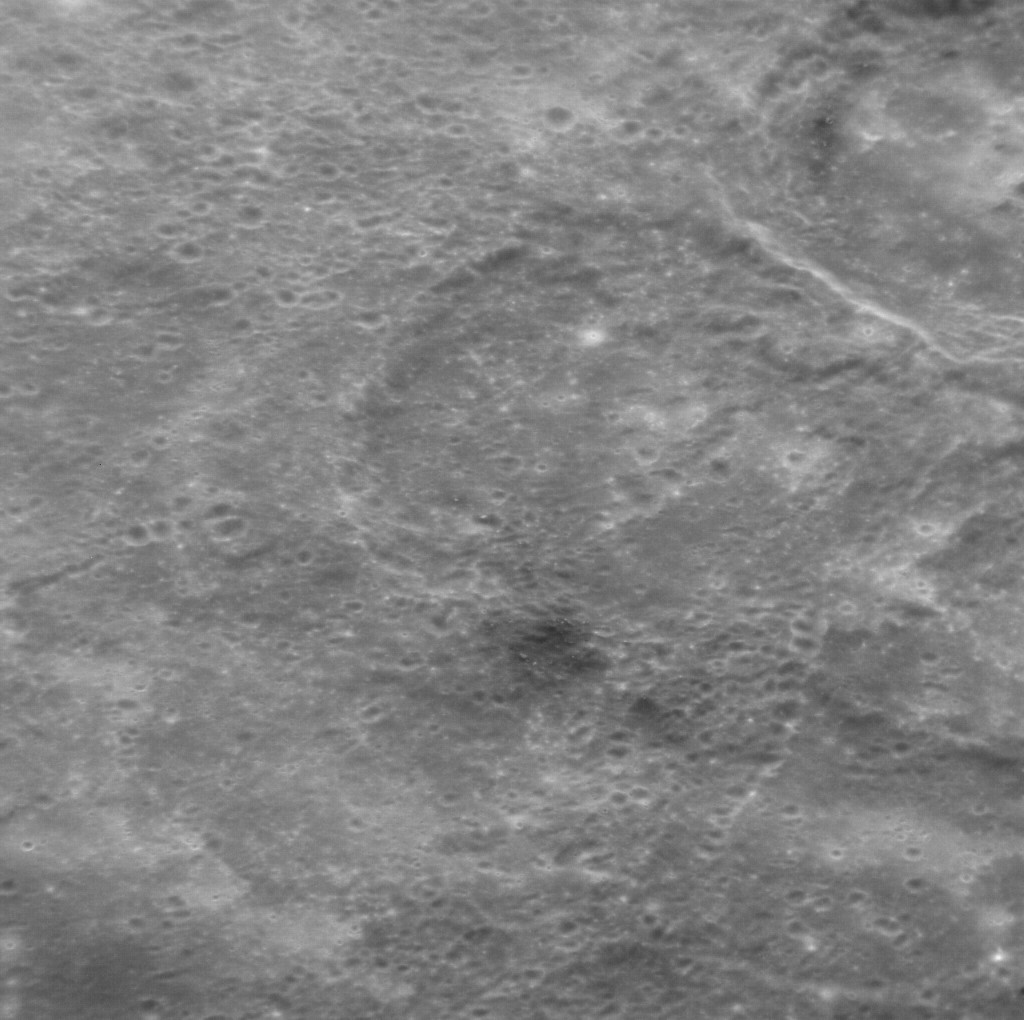
Dark spot southwest of Hauptmann (center)
