= Gin Cove =

Gin Cove may refer to:

- Gin Cove, Newfoundland and Labrador, Canada
- Gin Cove, Ulu Peninsula, Antarctica
