= Milltown, Ireland =

Milltown, Ireland can refer to several places in Ireland:

== In the Republic of Ireland ==
- Milltown, County Kerry
- Milltown, Dublin, a suburb of Dublin
- Milltown, County Cavan
- Milltown, County Galway

== In Northern Ireland ==
- Milltown, County Antrim, a village in the Lisburn City Council area of County Antrim
- Milltown, Antrim Borough, a village in the Borough of Antrim
- Milltown (near Maghery), a village near Maghery in the Craigavon Borough Council area of County Armagh
- Milltown (near Waringstown), a village near Waringstown in the Craigavon Borough Council area of County Armagh

== See also ==
For places outside Ireland known as Milltown, see Milltown (disambiguation)
