= Adderbury railway station =

Former railway station in Oxfordshire, England

Coordinates: 52.01033°N 1.30918°W

Adderbury
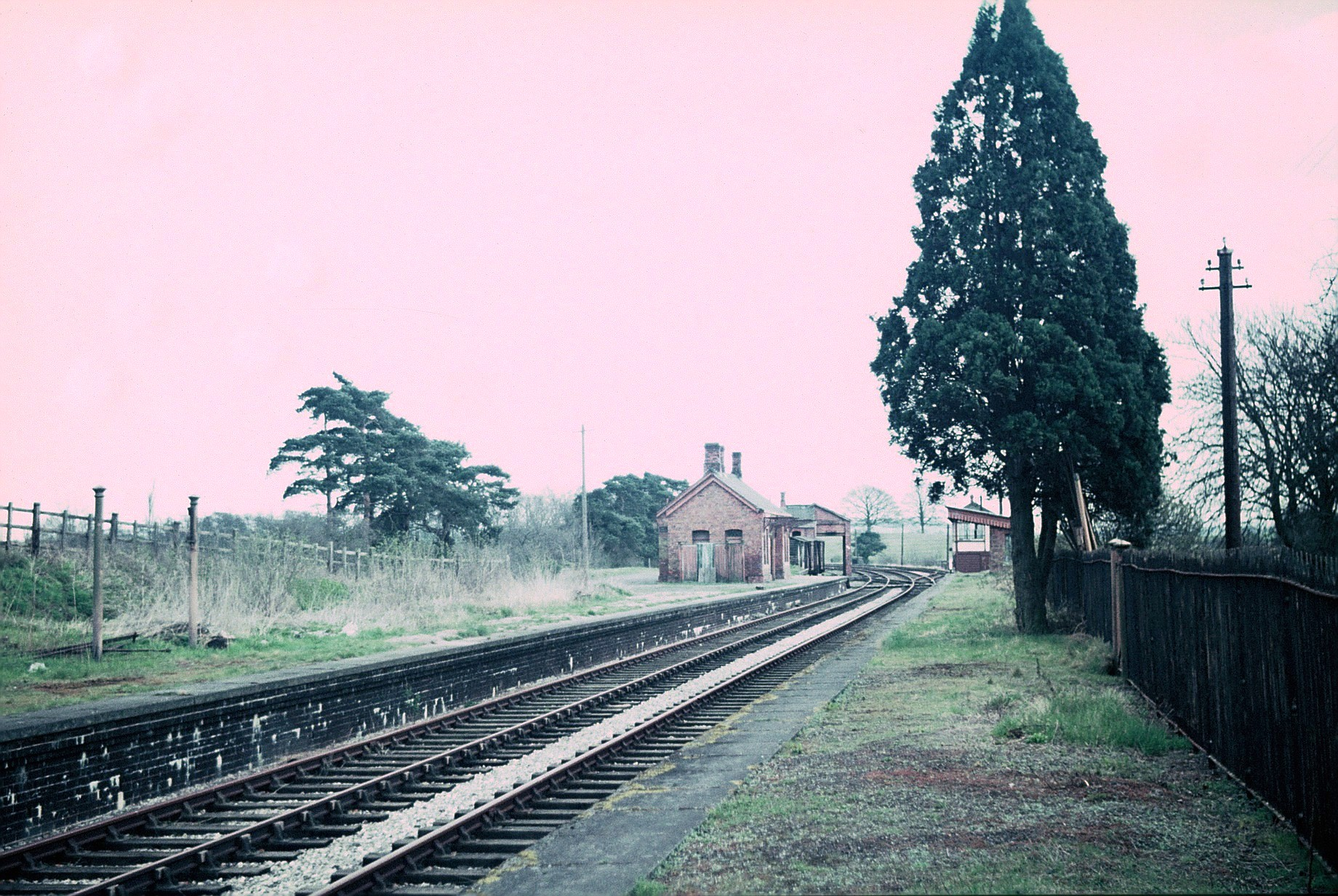
- Remains of the station in 1969.

General information
- Location: Adderbury, Cherwell; England
- Grid reference: SP475349
- Platforms: 2

Other information
- Status: Disused

History
- Original company: Banbury and Cheltenham Direct Railway
- Pre-grouping: Great Western Railway
- Post-grouping: Great Western Railway; Western Region of British Railways

Key dates
- 6 April 1887: Station opened
- 4 June 1951: Station closed
- 1969: Station closed for freight
Location

Adderbury railway station served the village of Adderbury in Oxfordshire, England.

== History ==
The station was built by the Banbury and Cheltenham Direct Railway, which was taken over by the Great Western Railway before its opening. When Britain's railways were nationalised in 1948 the B&CDR became part of the Western Region of British Railways, which then withdrew passenger services through Adderbury in 1951. The line through the station closed completely in 1969.

An industrial estate has now been built on the old station site and the only trace of the railway that remains today is some of the old goods building which was situated on the approach to the station and is used by a local scaffolding company.

== Route ==
Preceding station	Disused railways	Following station
Milton Halt; Line and station closed	Great Western Railway; Banbury and Cheltenham Direct Railway	Kings Sutton; Line closed, station open
