= Lady Cove =

Neighbourhood in Newfoundland and Labrador

- Settlement
- Interactive map of Lady Cove
- Coordinates: 48°5′38″N 53°50′38″W
- Country: Canada
- Province: Newfoundland and Labrador
- District: Trinity North

Lady Cove is a settlement located southeast of Clarenville, Newfoundland, and Labrador. The Post Office was established in 1898, and the first postmaster was Hayward Burt. It had a population of 120 in 1940 and 161 in 1956. Lady Cove is located on Random Island and is part of the local service district of Random Island West.

== See also ==
- List of communities in Newfoundland and Labrador
