= Milt (given name) =

Milt is a masculine given name, nearly always a short form (hypocorism) of Milton.

Notable people named Milt include:

- Milt G. Barlow (1843–1904), American entertainer
- Milt Bernhart (1926–2004), American jazz trombonist
- Milt Black (born 1949), Canadian ice hockey player
- Milt Bocek (1912–2007), American Major League Baseball player
- Milt Bolling (1930–2013), American baseball player
- Milt Bruhn (1912–1991), American football player and coach
- Milt Buckner (1915–1977), American jazz pianist and organist
- Milt Byrnes (1916-1979), American baseball player
- Milt Campbell (1933–2012), American decathlete
- Milt Carthens (1960–2021), American football player
- Milt Collins (born 1985), American-Canadian football player
- Milt Crain (born 1937), American gridiron football player
- Milt Cuyler (born 1968), American baseball player
- Milt Davis (1929–2008), American football player
- Milt Drewer (1923–2012), American college football head coach and CEO of First American Bank of Virginia
- Milt Dunnell (1905–2008), Canadian sportswriter
- Milt Earnhart (1918–2020), American politician
- Milt Fankhouser (1915–1970), American racing driver
- Milt Franklyn (1897–1962), American musical composer and arranger who worked on the Looney Tunes animated cartoons
- Milt Gabler (1911–2001), American record producer, responsible for many innovations in the recording industry
- Milt Galatzer (1907–1976), American baseball player
- Milt Gantenbein (1910–1988), American football player
- Milt Gaston (1896–1996), American baseball player
- Milt Ghee (1891–1975), American football player
- Milt Graff (1930-2005), American baseball player
- Milt Graham (1934–2021), American gridiron football player
- Milt Gray (1914–1969), American baseball player
- Milt Gross (1895-1953), American cartoonist and animator
- Milt Halliday (1906–1989), Canadian ice hockey player
- Milt Harradence (1922–2008), controversial Canadian criminal lawyer, pilot, politician and judge
- Milt Heflin (born 1943), NASA's first Chief Flight Director
- Milt Herth (1902–1989), American jazz organist
- Milt Hill (born 1965), American baseball player
- Milt Hinton (1910–2000), American jazz double bassist and photographer
- Milt Holland (1917–2005), American drummer
- Milt Jackson (1923–1999), American jazz vibraphonist
- Milt Jackson (American football) (1943–2005), American football coach
- Milt Jamin (1942–2018), American voice actor
- Milt Jordan (1927–1993), American baseball player
- Milt Josefsberg (1911–1987), American screenwriter
- Milt Kahl (1909–1987), American animator
- Milt Kamen (1921–1977), American actor
- Milt Kogan (born 1936), American actor
- Milt Larkin (1910–1996), American jazz trumpeter, bandleader and singer
- Milt Larsen (1931–2023), American businessman
- Milt Laurent (1901–1995), American baseball player
- Milt Machlin (1924–2004), American journalist, writer and adventurer
- Milt Martin (1931–2017), American football and wrestling coach
- Milt May (born 1950), American Major League Baseball player
- Milt McColl (born 1959), American National Football League player
- Milt Mead (1932–2000), American track and field athlete and basketball player
- Milt Morin (1942–2010), American football player
- Milt Neil (1914–1997), American animator and comics artist
- Milt Newton (born 1965), American basketball player and executive
- Milt Nielsen (1925–2005), American baseball player
- Milt Okun (1923–2016), American singer and record producer
- Milt Pahl (1943–2023), Canadian politician
- Milt Palacio (born 1978), Belizean-American basketball player
- Milt Pappas (1939–2016), American baseball player
- Milt Piepul (1918–1984), American football player, coach, athletics administrator
- Milt Plum (born 1935), American National Football League quarterback
- Milt Popovich (1915–2005), American football player
- Milt Ramírez (1950–2022), Puerto Rican Major League Baseball player
- Milt Raskin (1916–1977), American swing jazz pianist
- Milt Reed (1890–1938), American baseball player
- Milt Rehnquist (1892–1971), American National Football League player
- Milt Rosen (1922–2000), American television writer and author
- Milt Schmidt (1918–2017), Canadian ice hockey player
- Milt Schoon (1922–2015), American basketball player
- Milt Scott (1861–1938), American baseball player
- Milt Shefter (born 2000), American archivist
- Milt Shoffner (1905–1978), American baseball player
- Milt Simington (1918–1943), American football player
- Milt Smith (1929-1997), American baseball player
- Milt Smith (American football) (1919–2010), American football player
- Milt Sonsky (1941–2024), American javelin thrower
- Milt Steengrafe (1898–1977), American baseball player
- Milt Stegall (born 1970), American gridiron football player
- Milt Stock (1893–1977), American baseball player
- Milt Sunde (1942–2020), American National Football League player
- Milt Thomas (born 1942), American novelist
- Milt Thompson (baseball) (born 1959), American Major League Baseball player
- Milt Ticco (1922–2002), American basketball and baseball player
- Milt Trost (1913–1986), American football player
- Milt Turner (1930–1993), American jazz drummer
- Milt Wagner (born 1963), American basketball player and coach
- Milt Watson (1890–1962), American baseball player
- Milt Welch (1924–2019), American baseball player
- Milt Whitehead (1862–1901), Canadian baseball player
- Milt Wilcox (born 1950), American baseball player
- Milt Williams (born 1945), American basketball player
- Milt Wilson (1897–1967), American football player
- Milt Woodard (1911–1996), American sprotswriter
