= Apsey Brook =

- Unincorporated community
- Location within Newfoundland and Labrador Location within Canada
- Coordinates: 48°09′43″N 53°50′38″W
- Country: Canada
- Province: Newfoundland and Labrador

Population (1911)
  - Total: 50
- Time zone: UTC-3:30 (Newfoundland Time)
  - Summer (DST): UTC-2:30 (Newfoundland Daylight)
- Area code: 709

Apsey Brook is a settlement on Random Island in Trinity Bay. The post office closed on September 13, 1966. In 1911 the population was 50.

== See also ==
- List of communities in Newfoundland and Labrador
