= Milton Wright (academic) =

American academic

Dr. Milton S. J. Wright (1903 – 1972) was an African-American academic born in Georgia. He received his B.A. from Wilberforce University in 1926, his M.A. from Columbia University and his Ph.D. in Economics from Germany’s University of Heidelberg in 1932, with the dissertation Die Wirtschafts Entwicklung und die Eingeborenenpolitik in den afrikanischen Schutzgebieten, 1884-1918 (Economic Development and Indigenous policy in the African Protectorates, 1884–1918). He was granted an audience by Adolf Hitler in Heidelberg in 1932. Hitler pointed out that American blacks have no voting rights, and criticized them for being docile about their oppression, saying "Negroes must be definitely third-class people to allow white[s] to lynch them, beat them, segregate them, without rising up against them!" The Pittsburgh Courier ran a front page article on the conversation shortly after the U.S. entered the Second World War. Wright noted that throughout the conversation, Hitler, though calm, asked questions and immediately gave his own answers. For example, he asked "Don't you think your people are destined perpetually to be slaves of one kind or another?" and replied "Yes! Your people are a hopeless lot. I don't hate them... I pity the poor devils." The conversation was dramatically reenacted in 1944 on the anti-racist radio show New World A-Coming. Wright became a professor and head of the department of Economics and Political Science at Wilberforce in 1933 and in 1959 he was Dean of the College.

== Publications ==
- Milton Wright (1928). The Historical Development of Negro Journals. New York: Columbia University (Masters essay).
- Milton Wright (1932). Die Wirtschafts Entwicklung und die Eingeborenenpolitik in den afrikanischen Schutzgebieten, 1884-1918. Heidelberg: Badische Ruprecht-Karls-Universität.
- Wright, Milton S. J. (June 1950). "I Spent Four Hours with Adolph Hitler: First and Only Negro to Meet Nazi Dictator Tells of Terrifying Session After Storm Troopers Accuse Him of Plotting Hitler Assassination". Ebony. 5 (8).
