= Elliott's Cove =

Coordinates: 48°08′32″N 53°54′13″W

Elliott's Cove is a settlement located southeast of Clarenville in Newfoundland and Labrador, Canada. It is located on the western coast of Random Island.

== See also ==
- List of communities in Newfoundland and Labrador
