= Milton, Cherwell =

Village in Oxfordshire, England

Coordinates: 52.011°N 1.344°W

Milton
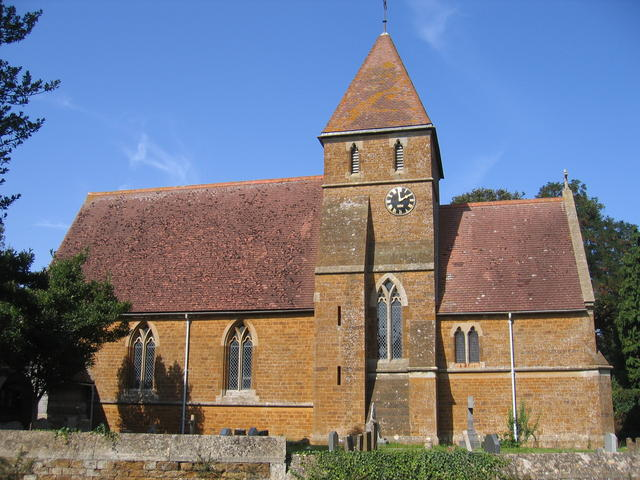
- St. John the Evangelist parish church

- Location within Oxfordshire
- Area: 3.28 km^{2} (1.27 sq mi)
- Population: 192 (2011 census)
  - Density: 59/km^{2} (150/sq mi)
- OS grid reference: SP4535
- Civil parish: Milton
- District: Cherwell
- Shire county: Oxfordshire
- Region: South East
- Country: England
- Sovereign state: United Kingdom
- Post town: Banbury
- Postcode district: OX15
- Dialling code: 01295
- Police: Thames Valley
- Fire: Oxfordshire
- Ambulance: South Central
- UK Parliament: Banbury

Milton is a village and civil parish about 2.5 miles (4 km) south of Banbury in Oxfordshire, on the Milton road between the villages of Adderbury and Bloxham.

- The Church of England parish church of Saint John the Evangelist was built in 1856 by the Gothic Revival architect William Butterfield
- The former Banbury and Cheltenham Direct Railway, part of the Great Western Railway, was completed in 1881. The GWR opened a small railway station, Milton Halt, in 1908 on the northern edge of the village near Manor Farm. British Railways closed the halt in 1951 and closed the railway to freight traffic in 1964. The track was removed in 1965
- The village is built near an affluent of the River Cherwell, and has many nature spots and footpaths surrounding it and leading from it.
- The village holds an annual fireworks display, as well as an annual barn dance
