= Milton, Kansas City =

Neighborhood of Kansas City, Missouri, U.S.

Coordinates: 39.219447°N 94.622457°W

Milton is a neighborhood of Kansas City, Missouri, United States.

Milton has the name of the local Milton family, original owners of the land where the community now stands.
