= Milton Wells =

American military general

Milton Wells (July 13, 1829 – April 10, 1906) was a Union Army officer during the American Civil War. A clergyman and teacher, he assisted in the recruitment of the 15th West Virginia Volunteer Infantry. On October 16, 1862, he was commissioned as a major. Wells was promoted to lieutenant colonel on August 20, 1864, and to colonel on October 14, 1864. He resigned his commission on April 6, 1865.

In recognition of his service, on March 18, 1867, President Andrew Johnson nominated Wells for appointment to the grade of brevet brigadier general of volunteers, to rank from March 13, 1865, and the United States Senate confirmed the appointment on March 28, 1867.

== See also ==
- List of American Civil War brevet generals (Union)
