= Snooks Harbour =

Settlement in Newfoundland, Canada

Coordinates: 48.164°N 53.875°W

Location of Snook's Harbour in Newfoundland and Labrador

Snooks Harbour is a settlement in the Canadian province of Newfoundland and Labrador. Snooks Harbour is on the island of Random Island and is part of the Local Service District of Random Island West.
