= Milton Keynes railway station =

Milton Keynes railway station could mean any of the six stations in the Milton Keynes urban area:

- Bletchley railway station
- Bow Brickhill railway station
- Fenny Stratford railway station
- Milton Keynes Central railway station
- Wolverton railway station
- Woburn Sands railway station

Of these, Milton Keynes Central is the largest and busiest.
