= Milltown GAA =

Milltown GAA may refer to:

- Milltown GAA (Galway), a sports club in Ireland
- Milltown GAA (Kildare), a sports club in Ireland

== See also ==
- Milltown Malbay GAA, a sports club in County Clare, Ireland
