= Kālidāsā (crater) =

Crater on Mercury

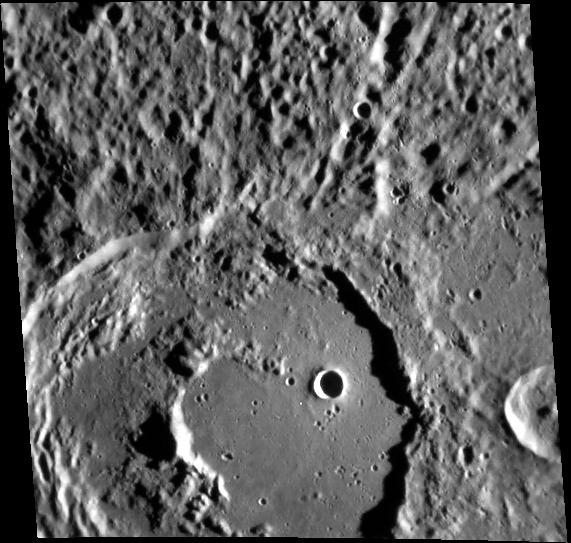
- MESSENGER image of Kālidāsā, the large impact basin in the lower left
- Feature type: Peak-ring impact basin
- Location: Tolstoj quadrangle, Mercury
- Coordinates: 18.21°S 179.82°W
- Diameter: 160 km (99 mi)
- Eponym: Kālidāsa

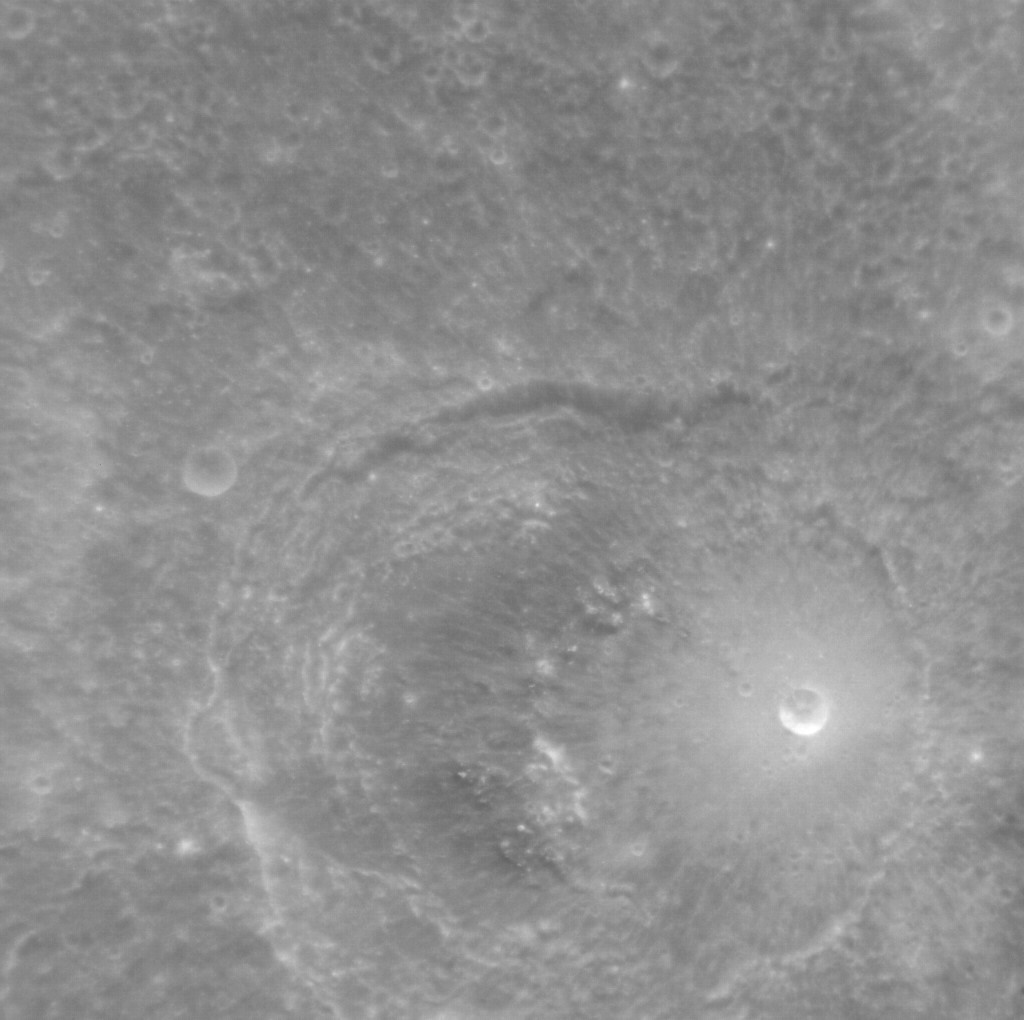
Oblique view of Kālidāsā

Kālidāsā is a crater on Mercury. Its name was adopted by the International Astronomical Union in 1976. Kalidasa is named for the Indian writer Kālidāsa, who lived in the 5th century CE.

Kālidāsā is one of 110 peak ring basins on Mercury.

To the north of Kālidāsā is Tir Planitia, and to the east is the Tolstoj basin. To the south is Hauptmann crater.
