= Milton Halt railway station =

Former railway station in England

Coordinates: 52.0140°N 1.3408°W

Milton Halt
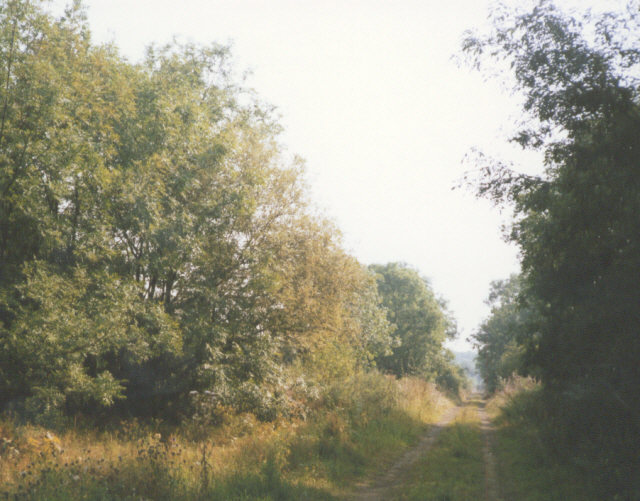
- Station site in 1991.

General information
- Location: Milton, Cherwell; England
- Grid reference: SP452352
- Platforms: 1

Other information
- Status: Disused

History
- Original company: Great Western Railway
- Pre-grouping: Great Western Railway
- Post-grouping: Great Western Railway; Western Region of British Railways

Key dates
- 1 January 1908: Station opens
- 4 June 1951: Station closes
Location

Milton Halt railway station is a former railway station that served the village of Milton in northern Oxfordshire, England.

== History ==
The station was built by the Great Western Railway. It opened to passengers on 1 January 1908 (Jenkins gives the date as 1 January 1906 but the Board of Trade plan on the same page is dated 14 November 1907 suggesting that the 1908 date given by other sources is correct). The Halt had a 120-foot-long (37 m) wooden platform and "pagoda" shelter. There was also a small corrugated iron shed, identified as "office" on the 1907 Board of Trade plan, with the area between the two buildings identified as "space for milk churns". Although no goods facilities were provided, milk traffic was important and as soon as the halt opened two farmers paid £5 a year each for milk carriage.

The halt was located on an embankment and approached by a cinder path from the road below. It was unstaffed and the guards of the first and last trains of the day would light and extinguish the oil lamps. Milton Halt came under the control of the Bloxham stationmaster and a porter from Bloxham would visit occasionally to re-fuel the lamps.

When Britain's railways were nationalised in 1948 the B&CDR became part of the Western Region of British Railways, which then closed the line through Milton to passengers in 1951.

== Route ==
Preceding station	Disused railways	Following station
Bloxham; Line and station closed	Great Western Railway; Banbury and Cheltenham Direct Railway	Adderbury; Line and station closed
