= Marc Rosenthal =

American singer-songwriter

Marc Joseph Rosenthal is an American singer and songwriter from New York City who sometimes performs with his band under the pseudonym Milton. He was born in Boston, Massachusetts and raised in Larchmont, New York. His first band was Bad Moustache, and he began his musical career opening for G-Love at concerts in Saratoga Springs, New York. He originally became well known for his hit song "In the City", which gained significant attention from being played on the New York City radio station WFUV. The song was later included on his self-titled second album, released in 2006. His subsequent song "Booker", a tribute to New Orleans pianist James Booker, was included on his 2008 album Grand Hotel, and later named "Song of the Day" by NPR.

== Discography ==
- Scenes from the Interior (Moon Caravan, 2003)
- Milton (Flying Horse, 2006)
- Grand Hotel (Maggadee, 2008)
