= Milton High School =

Milton High School may refer to:

== United States ==
- Milton High School (Florida)
- Milton High School (Georgia)
- Milton High School (Massachusetts)
- Milton Area High School, Pennsylvania
- Milton High School (Vermont)
- Milton High School (Wisconsin)

== Zimbabwe ==
- Milton High School (Zimbabwe)
