= Milton Trinidad =

Uruguayan footballer and coach (born 1939)

Personal information
- Full name: Milton Hector Trinidad Gonzalez
- Date of birth: May 16, 1939 (age 87)
- Place of birth: Montevideo, Uruguay
- Position: Striker

Senior career*
Years	Team	Apps	(Gls)
- Club Nacional de Futbol
- Sudbury italia
- * Club domestic league appearances and goals

Milton Hector Trinidad Gonzalez, born in Montevideo, Uruguay, on May 16, 1939, is a former football player and coach.

== College ==
From 1958 he studied at the Faculty of Dentistry of Montevideo (Uruguay), having worked in his native country for a long time in his dental office. He also studied for football, national category, receiving his degree in 1971.

== Playing career ==
While at the dental college in Montevideo, Uruguay he played on several occasions, for the university world championship of his category in Jakarta, Indonesia. The “National Club of Football” also contracted him to integrate its team in the youth sector. Thereafter, he continued his career in the following professional teams:

He played in the following professional teams:

Team	Year
Club Nacional de Futbol de Montevideo (Uruguay)	1955–1958
Liverpool Futbol Club (Uruguay)	1959–1964
Atlante Futbol Club (El Salvador)	1965–1967
Toronto Falcon's (MLS USA)	1968–1969
Sudbury Italia Futbol Club (Canada)	1969–1971

== Coaching career ==
Finished the championship league of Ontario, Canada, defending the colors of Sudbury Italy, Milton returns to his country to follow the course of national soccer coach. It is then, when the military Seleccion of Uruguay hires him. After this passage, his friend and coach of the Toronto Falcons of Canada, Ladislao Kubala, recommends him to lead in Portugal against the Sporting Clube Olhanense, and in the future to other teams in Spain. Subsequently, the FIFA agent, Dr. Pier Luigi Salvini, now deceased, began also to represent him for different teams placed in various parts of the world.

Team	Year
Seleccion Militar de Uruguay	1972–1976
Sporting Clube Olhanense (Portugal)	1976–1977
Racing del Ferrol (Spain)	1977–1978
Caravaca Club de Futbol (Spain)	1978–1979
Ternes Futbol Club (Francia)	1979–1981
Andorra Futbol Club (Principado de Andorra)	1982–1984
Oriental Futbol Club (Rivera, Uruguay)	1985–1988
Regina Soccer School (Canada)	1989–1990
Milan A.C., as trainer instructor of youth sector(Italia)	1991–1994
Santa Eulalia F.C. (Ibiza, Spain)	1994–1995
Ras-Al-Khaimah F.C. (Emiratos Arabes Unidos)	1996–1997
Metro Stars F.C. Soccer School (USA)	1997–1999
Soccer School of Puebla de Don Fadrique (Granada, Spain)	1999–2001
A.S.M.O. Fubol Club (Oran, Argelia)	2001–2002
Santa Rita F.C. (Vinces, Ecuador)	2003–2004

== Titles obtained ==
As player:

Team	Year
Junior Champion with the National Club of Football of Uruguay	1956-57-58
Uruguayan Youth Selection (Fifth Division)	1958
Champion League with Italy Sudbury in Canada	1969–1970

As trainer:

Team	Year
National Champion with Uruguay Military Selection	1974–1975
Promoted to the first division with Sporting Club Olhanense	1976–1977
Promoted to Second Division B with Racing de Ferrol	1977–1978
Champion with Caravaca C.F. Prefeente	1978–1979
Promotion to First Division with Ras-Al-Khaimah FC United Arab Emirates	1996–1997

== Today ==
Milton taught courses for coaches in the City of Portoviejo (Manabi, Ecuador)

He also instructed talks about tactics to football coaches in Brazil, the United States, Uruguay and Canada from 2003 to 2005.

Since 2005, Milton is in Cehegin (Murcia, Spain), with his wife Ana Maria and his two children, Massimiliano and Nathalie, where he works as a presenter for a television program, sport and culture, entitled "Tuesdays with Milton," which can be seen throughout the Northwest Region of Murcia. His third son, and the eldest, also called Milton, lives in Portugal with his family.

== Books published ==
"Futbol, solo habilidad?" Editorial Hispano Europea of Barcelona (Spain), 1973

"Entreainement sud-american" Chiron editions (Paris, France), 1975
