= R. Kalidas =

Indian politician

R. Kalidas was a politician in Tamil Nadu, India. He was State vice-president of the Hindu Makkal Katchi.

== Death ==
R. Kalidas was murdered in Madurai on 21 June 2005. According to police sources he was hacked to death by two men in broad daylight. He was 55 years old. Police sources indicated that they suspected 'fundamentalists' as the culprits of the murder.
