= Little Milton, Wollongong =

Little Milton
- Location within New South Wales Location within Australia
- 34.4225°S 150.8996°E
- Location: 31–33 Smith Street, Wollongong, City of Wollongong, New South Wales, Australia

History
- Built: 1830–1850

New South Wales Heritage Register
- Official name: Little Milton
- Type: state heritage (built)
- Designated: 2 April 1999
- Reference no.: 272
- Type: House
- Category: Residential buildings (private)

Little Milton is a heritage-listed residence at 31–33 Smith Street, Wollongong, City of Wollongong, New South Wales, Australia. It was built from 1830 to 1850. It was added to the New South Wales State Heritage Register on 2 April 1999.

== History ==
The site itself may date from the 1830s. Little Milton is thought to be the earliest surviving cottage in the urban portion of Wollongong, with the earliest surviving section of the complex dating from the 1850s (c. 1855 additions).

The original building was acquired soon after completion by Rev. George Charter, Wollongong's first Congregationalist Minister. It was built in the plain bungalow style. The once large grounds lent themselves to full domestic existence: coach house, stables, croquet lawn, tennis court, vegetable and flower gardens and sweeping lawns with flag pole; the Union Jack was raised to honour the British Empire on every appropriate day, including even Trafalgar Day. They worked for their church, and even kept a church garden, where only white flowers were grown, for the altar. They were devoted and lifelong workers for charity. Apart from sports like tennis and golf, at which they excelled, their recreations were dancing, music, singing, games and handcrafts such as spinning and knitting.

In the 1880s (variously described as 1883 or 1886) it was purchased by English doctor, Dr Timothy Wood Lee, and extended to its present form (with a "northern" wing running right out to the footpath) for his use as a surgery and residence. He practiced there for over three decades. His daughters kept on the house until their deaths.

In 1970 it was acquired by Mr and Mrs Seymour. In 1971 the property was inherited (willed to) three charities: Greenacres, the Crippled Children's Society (CCS) and the Anglican Church Mission. The property was due for auction in September 1973. Wollongong City Council and the Illawarra Historical Society asked the Perpetual Trustee Co. Ltd. to defer the auction to allow the National Trust of Australia (NSW) to evaluate if the property was worth restoring. The Trust and the Historical Society could not agree. The Trust felt the brick section was the only part worth restoring, but the Society wanted the whole building restored. There was a seven-month delay before the auction, as a single unit, occurred in April 1974. By then the bottom had fallen out of the real estate market and bidders would not consider the $200,000 reserve price sought.

Council had drawn up plans for subdivision before the auction. One of the conditions of sale was that the buyer would donate the building and surrounding land to Council to renovate and preserve for posterity. The buyer would be able to develop on the remaining land. When the property did not sell, Council decided to conduct a Lord Mayor's appeal to raise funds for the restoration, but this did not eventuate.

From 1974 until 1977 the property was on the real estate market by Perpetual Trustee Co. Ltd. for sale in two lots, 1) house and surrounding land (993.8sq.m.); and 2) a battle axe block with access to Smith Street (1896 sq.m.). The principal beneficiaries (Greenacres, CCS and the Anglican Church Mission) noted the property was costing them $5000 a year to maintain. Mr R. Henderson of CCS said the bank loan and interest taken out in 1973 to keep Little Milton occupied and maintained and pay the smaller beneficiaries of the will (about $15,000) was the main cause of the debt. Land taxes, rates, insurance and caretaker wages were also drawing heavily on the estate.

In March 1977, the beneficiaries offered Little Milton to Wollongong City Council for $135,000 but Council rejected the offer.

As a final effort to rid themselves of the property, the beneficiaries decided to try to auction the property in the two subdivisions (land parcels) worked out by Council in 1974.

In 1979 Mr. & Mrs G. & C. V. A. Seymour, in seeking financial assistance, nominated the property for protection under the Heritage Act, 1977. They restored the building, replacing verandah flooring, controlling rising damp, electrical rewiring, plastering, painting, plumbing and repairs to boarding and roofs. Terminites and borers had led to general deterioration of house fabric at this time.

In 1980 a grant of $3,000 was provided to engage a consultant to prepare a restoration plan of Little Milton. A further $10,000 loan was offered but not accepted.

In recognition of its heritage significance and to protect the building from redevelopment and from possible road works to Smith Street a Permanent Conservation Order was placed over the property on 9 September 1983.

In 1992, the owners received approval to renew the existing roof, add a new attic room and carry out general maintenance.

It was transferred to the State Heritage Register on 2 April 1999.

Little Milton was sold for between $900,000 and $1 million in 2008.

In 2018, the building houses medical offices.

== Description ==
Little Milton is an old bungalow-type dwelling with pitched and hipped roofs, standing some 12.2m from the footpath on approximately 0.3ha of land. The site is believed to date from the 1830s, with additions around 1855 and the northern wing in 1886.

The front garden comprises two large camphor laurel trees (Cinnamomum camphora), a mature cabbage tree palm (Livistona australis), a Canary Island date palm (Phoenix canariensis) which has been parasitised by an adventitious seedling fig (Ficus rubiginosa) that has reached great size, encircling the palm's trunk. A low wooden picket fence and gates face Smith Street. Gravel paths and low box (Buxus sempervirens) hedge-edged beds face a circular space between the 1850s bungalow "house" and the northern wing to its right.

The 1850s portion of Little Milton consisted of a single-storey residence (the early part in sandstone and (heavily cream-) rendered brick with a shingle roof ) and a two-storey servants and services building adjacent to it. Both buildings have rendered and whitewashed walls and corrugated iron roofs. The residence has a hipped roof penetrated by two chimneys as well as French doors leading out onto a surrounding verandah. The services building has a pitched roof with simply detailed barge boards.

In the 1880s (c. 1886) a single storey building wing was added to the west extending from the street alignment) with exposed (weathered apricot-coloured) sandstock brick-work, a pitched (iron) roof and decorative barge boards was added on the street side of the services wing. A lean-to verandah with champhered posts and a cast iron valence was erected to integrate the old and new structures. At this time it is probable that a timber framed and glazed conservatory was added behind the residence, enclosing an early well. Two doors in the northern facade of this western wing open directly onto the footpath, giving access to the surgery. A pedestrian path immediately to the west of the 1886 wing gave patients access to the Doctor's waiting room, located in the rear room of the 1850s bungalow).

Internal cedar joinery including chimney piece in room to right of front door; cabinets in same room.

In the south-western corner is a two-storey servants' and services building, comprising a large kitchen or laundry area with a (small) cellar below and a large attic above (converted into two bedrooms). This part of the building was probably contemporary with the bungalow section, erected in c.1907.

An appendage at the rear (east) of the bungalow section is what was formerly used as a billiard room (NB: this has since been demolished to ground level, the brick-lined well (original) surviving below a plasterboard cover (former floor).

Another small wing extension to the north-east at the bungalow's rear may date to the 1940s.

A small timber-framed fibro area formerly existed within the western wing, but this has been demolished and is now an open courtyard.

The rear garden dates from the 1970s subdivision (a battle-axe block with flats on it was built), comprising four Hill's figs (Ficus microcarpa var. Hillii) for screening, four Leyland Green cypress (x Cuprocyparis leylandii 'Leighton's Green') in the south-western corner to screen another block of flats to the south, a raised terrace and one mature but dead bangalow palm (Archontophoenix cunninghamiana).

== Heritage listing ==
Little Milton is thought to be the earliest surviving cottage in the urban section of Wollongong. The first section of the house complex was constructed in the 1850s.

Little Milton was listed on the New South Wales State Heritage Register on 2 April 1999.
