= Robinson Bight =

Coordinates: 48.1°N 53.8°W

Robinson Bight is a settlement located on Random Island, near the east coast of Newfoundland, at Trinity Bay, Canada. It shares a name with the bight at its location.

== Former settlement ==
It was first known as Pissing Mere, a local name for streams and waterfalls. It was the winter home for the Robinson family from Trinity, in the late 18th century. It was one of the first places to be settled on the Northwest Arm of Random Sound. It was later abandoned some time after 1889.

== Current settlement ==
In the 1970s a new community was created close to the original site, a bit further away from the coast, acquiring the same name. There is no census data available for this locale today. The current region is an unincorporated community and is part of a Local Service District named Hickman's Harbour-Robinson Bight.

== See also ==
- Random Island
- List of communities in Newfoundland and Labrador
