= Hickman's Harbour =

Coordinates: 48°06′16.02″N 53°44′26.05″W

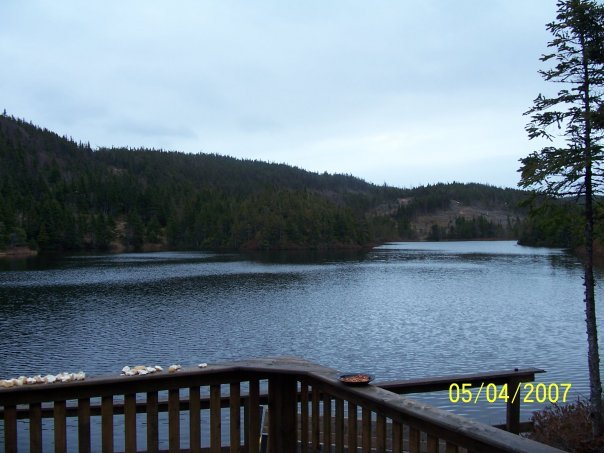

Hickman's Harbour is a village southeast of Clarenville, on Random Island in Trinity Bay. The first Waymaster in 1881 was Joseph Pilley. By 1900, Hickman's Harbour, the site of the best deep-water anchorage on the island, had become the centre of the Random Island fishing and shipbuilding industries. Other methods of employment include sawmilling and slate mining, though the actual quarry was across the sound in Nut Cove. By 1901 Hickman's Harbour was the most populous community on Random Island with 309 people. The population was 476 in 1956.

== See also ==
- List of communities in Newfoundland and Labrador
