= Milton (crater) =

Crater on Mercury

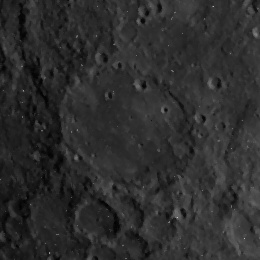
- Mariner 10 image of Milton
- Feature type: Impact crater
- Location: Michelangelo quadrangle, Mercury
- Coordinates: 25.2°S 174.8°W
- Diameter: 186 km
- Eponym: John Milton

Milton is a crater on Mercury. It has a diameter of 186 kilometers. Its name was adopted by the International Astronomical Union in 1976. Milton is named for the English poet John Milton, who lived from 1608 to 1674.

== MESSENGER Views ==
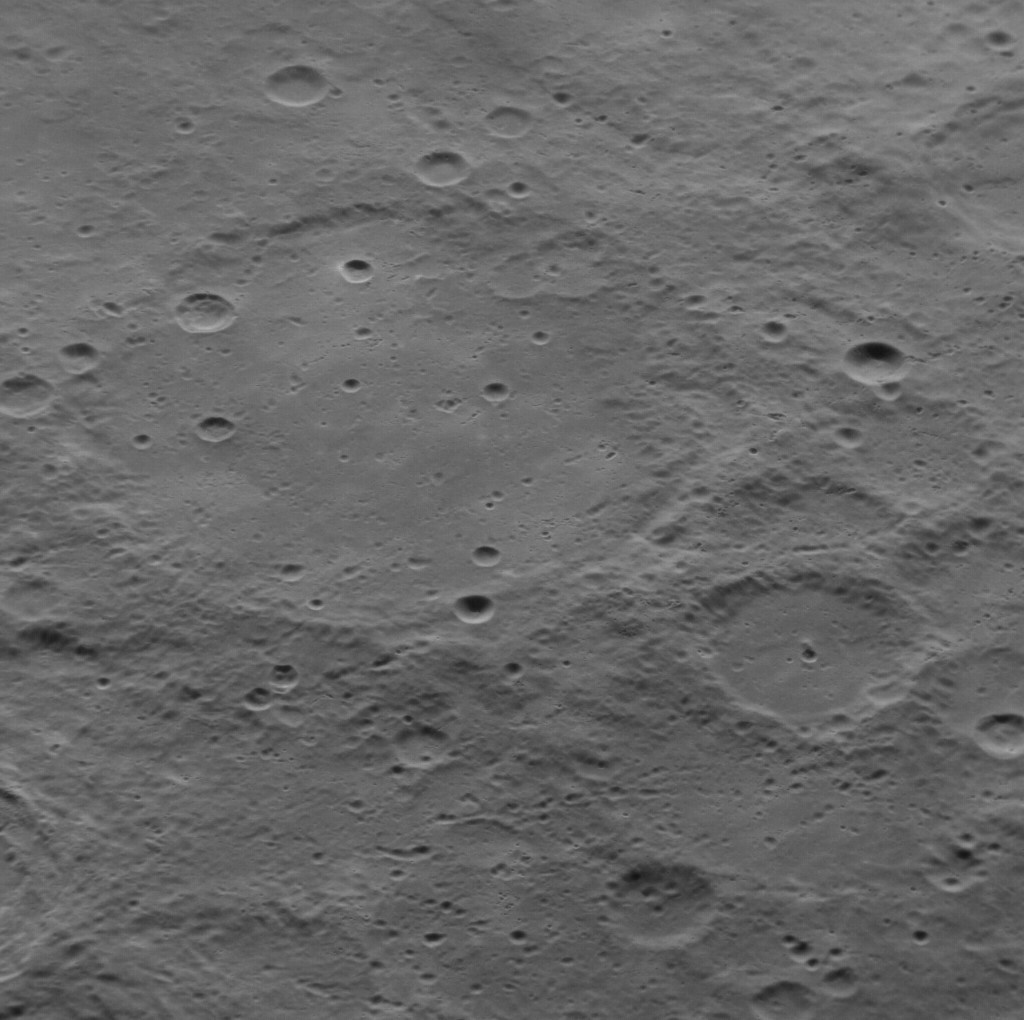
Oblique view looking west

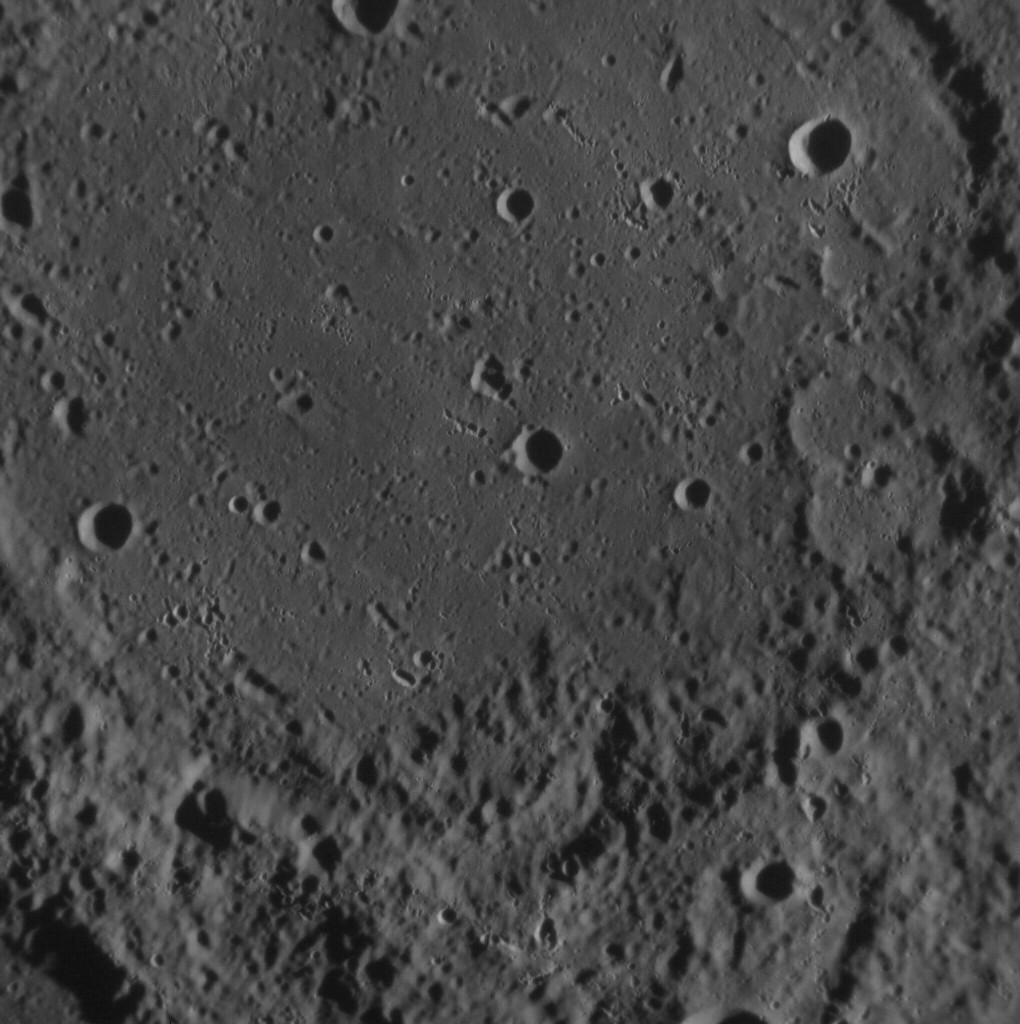
Southern Milton
