= Waterville, Newfoundland and Labrador =

Neighbourhood in Newfoundland and Labrador, Canada

Waterville
- Neighbourhood
- Interactive map of Waterville
- Coordinates: 48°11′57″N 53°47′21″W
- Country: Canada
- Province: Newfoundland and Labrador
- Region: Central Newfoundland
- Time zone: UTC−3:30 (Newfoundland Time Zone)
  - Summer (DST): UTC−2:30 (Newfoundland Daylight Time)
- Area code: 709

Waterville is an unincorporated place located in Newfoundland and Labrador, east of Clarenville.

== See also ==
- List of communities in Newfoundland and Labrador
