= Gin Cove, Newfoundland and Labrador =

Coordinates: 48°11′48″N 53°48′55″W

Location of Gin Cove in Newfoundland

Historical populations
Year	Pop.
1901	33
1936	13
1941	45
1945	41
1951	15

Gin Cove is a village located on the north side of Smith Sound on the east coast of Newfoundland and Labrador. The community was first recorded in the 1901 census with a population of 33. Thomas and Louisa (née Butt) Frampton moved to Gin Cove in 1866 from Little Catalina, it is uncertain if they were the first settlers of Gin Cove or not. There were a variety of industries in Gin Cove including fishing, woodcutting and shipbuilding. The population peaked at 45 in 1941 but in the late 1940s people started to move away to find employment, mostly to nearby Clarenville. The community is now part of the local service district of Smith Sound.

== See also ==
- List of communities in Newfoundland and Labrador
