= Milton (surname) =

- Language: English

Origin
- Origin: Germanic

Milton is an English surname. Notable people with the surname include:

- Aaron Milton (born 1992), Canadian football player
- Anne Milton (born 1955), United Kingdom Member of Parliament
- Arthur Milton (1928–2007), English cricketer and footballer
- Berth Milton Sr. (1926–2005), Swedish pornographer
- Berth Milton Jr. (born 1955), Swedish pornographer
- Brian Milton (born 1942), British ultralight aircraft pilot
- CB Milton (born 1968), pop singer
- Damian Milton (born 1973), British sociologist and social psychologist
- Dennis Milton (1961–2026), American boxer
- Eric Milton (born 1975), American Major League Baseball player
- Giles Milton (born 1966), British journalist and writer
- Joe Milton (born 2000), American football player
- John Milton (1608–1674), English poet
- John Milton (composer), English father of the poet John Milton
- John Milton (Florida politician), American politician who was the fifth governor of Florida
- John Milton (Georgia politician), Secretary of State of Georgia from 1777 to 1799
- John Milton Niles (1787–1856), U.S. editor and political figure from Connecticut
- John Gerald Milton (1881–1977), Democratic US. Senator from New Jersey
- Keenan Milton (1974–2001), American professional skateboarder who died in 2001
- Kendall Milton, (born 2002), American football player
- Lance Milton (born 1987), Canadian football player
- McKenzie Milton, (born 1997), American football player
- Michael A. Milton (born 1958), American theologian
- Michael Milton (cricketer), English cricketer
- Michael Milton (skier), Australian Winter Paralympic skier and cyclist
- Peter Milton (born 1930), American artist
- Roy Milton (1907–1983), American jump blues performer and bandleader
- Shake Milton (born 1996), American basketball player
- Tommy Milton (1893–1962), American race car driver
- Trevor Milton, (born 1982), American billionaire, CEO and co-founder of Nikola Motor Company
- William Hall Milton (1864–1942), U.S. Senator from Florida
- William Henry Milton (1854–1930), administrator of Mashonaland and South African cricket player
