= Milltown, County Antrim =

Village in County Antrim, Northern Ireland

Coordinates: 54°32′32″N 6°2′30″W

Milltown
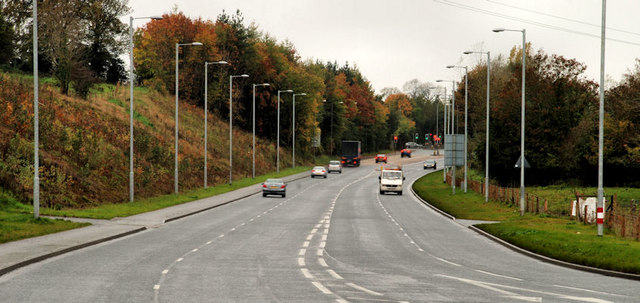
- Wilmar Road

- Location within Northern Ireland
- Population: 1,499 (2011 Census)
- Country: Northern Ireland
- Sovereign state: United Kingdom
- Post town: LISBURN
- Postcode district: BT28
- Dialling code: 028
- Police: Northern Ireland
- Fire: Northern Ireland
- Ambulance: Northern Ireland

Milltown is a small settlement in County Antrim, Northern Ireland. It is within the townland of Derriaghy, about one mile to the north of Lisburn. Once a rural village, it is now part of Greater Belfast. However, it is separated from the surrounding urban area by a narrow stretch of countryside. It had a population of 1,499 people (571 households) in the 2011 Census.

Milltown is a local service centre with facilities including retail units, the former Derriaghy Primary School, Christ Church, Church of Ireland and hall, Derriaghy Gospel Hall and a Community Centre. There is a railway halt in Derriaghy, to the east.

== History ==
Milltown owes much of its history to the succession of mills that were established by the early 19th century, and which continued to develop over the next century. Christ Church, a local landmark, lies to the eastern end of the settlement and is situated on an earlier site that dates back to at least the medieval period. Throughout the 19th century the village of Milltown was fairly modest in size, but the settlement expanded significantly in the later 20th century. Milltown is also home to Northern Ireland's second oldest pub, The Speckled Hen. It was founded in 1660 AD.

== See also ==
- List of towns and villages in Northern Ireland
