= Milton Goldstein (photographer) =

Milton Goldstein (May 30, 1915 – May 17, 2000) was a Jewish American author and photographer. He was born in New York City and died in St. George, Utah. Goldstein was a statistician, accountant, and attorney before becoming a photographer in 1970. Goldstein helped to popularize landscape photography of the national parks of the United States.

== Early life ==
Milton started his law career in New York City. In 1949, Goldstein decided to transfer his law offices out West to Southern California. After working for 15 years in California, Milton began contemplating photography. His love for the mountains led to a few changes in his life, and he wanted to be near the mountain grandeur he loved. Because of its proximity to Yosemite National Park he wanted to move to Fresno first, but after he found out about fog and low visibility in winter, he cancelled his interest. His second decision was the Pacific Coast Highway, but he abandoned his plans for the same reasons. In 1976 he moved to Bishop, California, for a few years, but returned to Los Angeles from November 1979 to July 1981. His call of the mountains stayed. To be closer to nature and the mountains, but still able to work with his clients in Los Angeles, he moved to Westlake Village, 35 miles (56 km) northwest of Los Angeles.

Milton Goldstein was born in New York City and died on May 17, 2000, in St. George, Utah. He started his career as an attorney and a certified public accountant before he moved to Utah and became a photographer. He was fascinated by the American West which led to the Smithsonian Institution exhibiting his dye transfer as a one-man show: The Magnificent West: An American Heritage. After the loss of his mother, he was left deeply disturbed and turned to the camera in his own personal attempt to create an ideal world of unknown mountain beauty. His wife, Martha, was a devoted editor and supporter to all of his practice.

== Influences ==
Goldstein was a highly spiritual man. Although he was Jewish, he quoted from the New Testament quite frequently with his photos. Goldstein was an active member of a TV/radio show called Religion in Media (or RIM) where he was elected president from 1982 to 1983. He was known to give beautiful and poetic prayers on the show, from which he received many compliments and fan mail. Two of the books that Goldstein claimed most influential on his works were The Nature of Light and Colour in Open Air, by M. Minnaert, and Photographers on Photography, by Lyons.

Goldstein was highly influenced by the words of Romantic poets (such as Keats and Wordsworth) because of their shared interest in Nature and the divine qualities that it has. Many Romantic poets worshipped Nature almost religiously. This idea resonated with Goldstein because of his spirituality. He used Nature as a supplement to his religious beliefs.

Milton Goldstein had many different influences throughout his journey as a photographer. His style of writing is good and poetic of his love for nature just like the many quote he has above each of his manuscripts. Most of the people he would often quote were people such as William Shakespeare, Kahlil Gibran, and John Muir.

== Photography career ==
Goldstein did not own a camera until 1964. He assumed that the field of photography was saturated, and there was no more work to be done. However, upon further realization, he discovered that only the surface of photography had been scratched. Inspired by the vast beauty of the American West, Goldstein began photographing in 1967. By 1971, he had closed his attorney and C.P.A. offices, and became a full-time photographer. One of the highlights of Goldstein's career was a traveling exhibition done in collaboration with the Smithsonian Institution entitled Magnificent West: American Heritage. The exhibition was highly successful and was displayed in more destinations for a longer amount of time than Smithsonian traveling exhibitions. The Magnificent West: American Heritage exhibition ran for four years, from July 1973 to May 1977, traveled to 26 states, and had 39 shows. This exhibition was well received by many museums and schools. Dennis A. Gould from the Smithsonian commented,

Milton Goldstein's photographs produced feelings that cannot be articulated. Many should be able to view these works and be bathed in their light, marvel over their subtleties, and be quieted by their magnificent grandeur.

Robert A. Weinstein of the Natural History Museum of Los Angeles County said of Milton Goldstein's work,

In a time when the public presentation of visual images is near-overwhelming, it is no mean feat to find new meanings in old subjects or add even greater pleasure to oft-seen images. It is precisely here that Goldstein brings to bear the awesome power of his vision.

Within his work on the "Magnificent West" Milton produced several works focused on Zion National Park. Goldstein stressed that within his photos, transparency counted most. Accepting that the vast park could never fully be captured, he set out to capture glimpses of the park that did justice to its beauty. To aide his photographs he included quotes from several different writers, including Ralph Waldo Emerson, John Keats, Henry David Thoreau, John Muir, William Shakespeare, in order to help embody not only visually but spiritually the essence he tried to capture. Goldstein spent decades in and out of the park capturing the different seasons, finding that spring brought rich foliage color, summer dealt with vibrant light, fall focused on light and shadow, and winter focused on saturating light, finding that the light provided by the afternoon and sunset was undeniably when the park was most beautifully displayed. As he worked to capture several angles of different mountains, Goldstein was passionate about the beauty of Zion and his work. He expressed that it was "The Sentinel" in the light of a new sunrise one morning that permanently sealed his love for the park. As he spent a great deal of time in the park he was always patient with his photos, stressing the importance of capturing the park's true essence. A great example of this was his work with "Lady Mountain". Goldstein worked to capture the glory of this mountain and its "superb glowing tone", but he found that it took two full years from his first encounter with it to capture a photograph he felt did it justice. Even still, it was 23 years from his first encounter that he set out to, not only do it justice, but to create something that "yielded infinite pleasure". Milton stated that, after countless attempts, he gave up. Two days later snow fell, and on his last effort he managed to capture a photo of "lady mountain" that embodied everything he wanted from it.

Goldstein strived to capture mountain portraits in all seasons, weather, and lighting. This way of photographing included a lot of observation and study of the mountains photographed. He stated that it takes a series of photographs to be a "complete portrait of a majestic mountain", but that it was still a "barely adequate introduction". Goldstein focuses on individual peaks instead of the vast mountain ranges. He shows that they all have something interesting and beautiful to be captured. He strived to illuminate or expose the beauty in nature to those that may overlook the grand simplistic wonder of these mountain forms. Goldstein said, "The greatest challenge, and most thrilling exhilaration, comes from reducing the artist's materials to a stark simplicity." He wanted to bring the viewer to a new sense of appreciation. In one of his Zion compilations, Goldstein says, "To those who think that to have seen one mountain is to have seen them all, (as I heard an exhausted husband yell at a thrilled wife, in Yosemite), it may be difficult to realize that one can never completely see even one mountain. Even its basic form will be continually hanging, re-shaped by light and shadow, during the course of any day. In addition, changes in the viewpoint of the observer, the color and tones of light, and the moods of the sky, provide any mountain with so many faces that its appearance is always a fresh vision." In his photography he exposes the wonders of God's creation as if to say "How can you not believe?" Goldstein often quotes the words of Romantic poets because of their shared interest in Nature. John Keats, William Wordsworth, John Muir, Ralph Waldo Emerson, and Henry David Thoreau are some that are frequently quoted in his works.

== National Park Service ==
On June 8, 1906, came the Lacey Antiquities Act, in which the President of the United States was authorized to reserve and establish sites and structures containing historic or scientific value to the nation. Congress officially authorized the National Park Service on August 24, 1916, but did not begin providing funding until April 17, 1917. Goldstein was featured in a full spread from Century City News in June 1978. It discusses his relationship with Horace Albright of the National Park Service:

Horace Alrbright secured and preserved millions of acres of national parks and monuments so people could enjoy them; Milton Goldstein has captured and preserved their beauty so people can understand and respect them.

== Death and legacy ==
Many people wrote letters to Mr. Goldstein and his family, expressing appreciation for his work and commenting on his spiritual connection. A letter written by Leslee Scamahorn after his "Religion in Media" show on March 16, expressed just this.

== Works ==
=== Books ===
- The Magnificent West: Yosemite (Doubleday, 1973)
- The Magnificent West: Grand Canyon (Doubleday, 1977)

Goldstein's first book on Yosemite was reviewed by Irving Desfor for the Rome News Tribune.

Goldstein authored and illustrated additional books on landscape photography, but these were never published.

=== Works of art in public collections ===
- Landscape, c. 1945–54, in the Dallas Museum of Art

=== Essays and magazine articles ===
- "Altars of Stone: A Photo Essay of Zion," St. George Magazine, vol. 25 (2000), pp. 25–29.

== Exhibitions ==
- The Magnificent West: An American Heritage, Smithsonian Institution, Washington, D.C., Museum of Natural History, April, 1973
- National Park Service, one Smithsonian Exhibition set donated, to the National Park Service as a permanent exhibit
- Goldstein's Zion: Visions and Reflections at Brigham Young University Museum of Art, 1998
- Camera and Soul: Milton Goldstein at Brigham Young University Museum of Art, 2004
- Retrospective at Bakersfield Museum of Art
- "The Magnificent West: An American Heritage", Milton Goldstein Mountain Photo Gallery, ABC Entertainment Center, Century City, California 90067

== Awards received ==
- Winner of RIM Silver Angel at Angel awards for "Mountain of Faith", 1982
- Winner of Silver Angel for Television Entry "Rungs of the Ladder", 1981
- Winner of 2 Gold Angel awards, Volume 1 Number 5 of "The RIMinder", 1982

== Appears on ==
- Speak Out - KTTV. November 18, 1978
- Dimensions, "The Creation" - KABC. January 13, 1980
- Dimensions, "The Rungs of the Ladder" - KABC. March 16, 1980
- Dimensions, "Prayers" - May 11, 1980
