= Lower Lance Cove =

Local service district and designated place in Newfoundland and Labrador, Canada

Coordinates: 48.145°N 53.703°W

Location of Lower Lance Cove in Newfoundland and Labrador

Lower Lance Cove is a local service district and designated place in the Canadian province of Newfoundland and Labrador.

== Geography ==
Lower Lance Cove is in Newfoundland within Subdivision L of Division No. 7.

== Demographics ==
As a designated place in the 2016 Census of Population conducted by Statistics Canada, Lower Lance Cove recorded a population of 85 living in 42 of its 70 total private dwellings, a change of -12.4% from its 2011 population of 97. With a land area of 0.85 km^{2} (0.33 sq mi), it had a population density of 100.0/km^{2} (259.0/sq mi) in 2016.

== Government ==
Lower Lance Cove is a local service district (LSD) that is governed by a committee responsible for the provision of certain services to the community. The chair of the LSD committee is Leslie Ivany.

== See also ==
- List of communities in Newfoundland and Labrador
- List of designated places in Newfoundland and Labrador
- List of local service districts in Newfoundland and Labrador
