= Smith Sound, Newfoundland and Labrador =

Coordinates: 48°09′27″N 53°41′47″W

Location of Smith Sound in Newfoundland

Smith Sound is a zigzag 24 kilometre inner region of Trinity Bay. This sound is one of the longest portions of inshore waterways in Newfoundland, located on its north-eastern coast in the Canadian province of Newfoundland and Labrador. Bonavista Peninsula is to the north of the sound, while Random Island is to the south. The waters that make up the sound is a continuous channel that encircles Random Island, broken only by a narrow channel located at Clarenville where a causeway was built to provide access to the communities on Random Island. The channel on the south side of Random Island is Northwest Arm.

== Early history ==
The area was visited seasonally by fishermen in the 18th century, and first settled in the 19th century. On September 5, 1822, William Cormack sailed through Smith Sound to explore the region with Sylvester Joe, a Mi'kmaq guide. Cormack's account of his travels were published in 1824 and republished in 1856.

Permanent residents settled in during the 1850s through 1870s. In addition to the fishery industry, others were involved in sawmilling and slate quarrying. Towns abounded on both shores. Some changed or merged over the years, but a partial list includes White Rock and Burnt Brook (or "Brickyard"), the site of an 1850s brick plant at the head of Smith Sound, along with British Harbour, also at the head of Smith Sound, but now an abandoned community, as is Popes (or Pope's) Harbour. Other communities included Britannia, Lower Lance Cove, and Petly (now Petley), Random Island's second largest community, a merger of two original communities of Upper Lance Cove and Aspen cove). George's Brook was settled early on, around 1862, after John Pelley started a saw mill. King's Cove was renamed Milton in 1910. Sandy Point became Harcourt, White rock Gin Cove, Upper Rocky Brook became Monroe. Daniel's Cove became Waterville. Burgum's Cove was renamed Burgoyne's Cove in honour of a British general, John Burgoyne, who spent time in the area in the late 18th century.

== Present day ==
=== 1953 Nut Cove tragedy ===
On the north shore of Smith Sound, across from Britannia, lies Nut Cove, the site of a slate quarry run by three brothers, William Carberry, George Carberry and Jubal Carberry, during 1850-1900. Approximately 100 years later, it became better known as the inclement-weather crash site of an American Convair B-36 bomber known as The Peacemaker, killing all on board on March 18, 1953, including Brigadier General Richard E. Ellsworth. The flight originated in the Azores and was bound for the plane's home in Rapid City Air Force Base, South Dakota, renamed Ellsworth Air Force Base. The calamity claimed more lives that night when all on board a second plane, a Boeing SB-29 Superfortress from Harmon Air Force Base in Stephenville, Newfoundland and Labrador spotted the downed Convair, then disappeared, the plane and crew never seen again.

=== Industry ===
In addition to its jellyfish harvesting industry, Smith Sound is known for its large Atlantic cod population. Fourteen-year-old cod are not unusual here.

=== 2003 frozen cod mystery ===
In April 2003, thousands of dead cod, a weight of approximately a quarter-million pounds, washed up on the shores of the sound within a few days, called an ecological disaster, prompting scientific research into the cause. After an interview with DFO scientist John Brattey, CBC St. John’s news website posted:

Brattey says the water remains the coldest that the department has ever recorded in the area, and some fish will continue to die. He says tests show some of the cod have an anti-freeze protein, while others don't. Otherwise, the dead cod appears to have been healthy up until it was instantly frozen by contact with ice crystals. Brattey says the organs of the dead cod are frozen solid, even though the flesh of the fish is pliable.

=== Tourism ===
- Route 232, Smith Sound Road - located on the Bonavista Peninsula, north side of the sound.
- The scenic Smith Sound Trail - located at Brittania.

== See also ==
- List of communities in Newfoundland and Labrador
