= Petley, Newfoundland and Labrador =

Local service district in Canada

Coordinates: 48°09′00″N 53°45′00″W

Petley is a local service district and designated place in the Canadian province of Newfoundland and Labrador. It is east of Clarenville.

== History ==
In 1951 the first postmistress was Annie Gladys Walters.

== Geography ==
Petley is in Newfoundland within Subdivision L of Division No. 7.

== Demographics ==
As a designated place in the 2016 Census of Population conducted by Statistics Canada, Petley recorded a population of 88 living in 40 of its 59 total private dwellings, a change of 10% from its 2011 population of 80. With a land area of 1.18 km^{2} (0.46 sq mi), it had a population density of 74.6/km^{2} (193.2/sq mi) in 2016.

== Government ==
Petley is a local service district (LSD) that is governed by a committee responsible for the provision of certain services to the community. The chair of the LSD committee is Shirley Walters.

== See also ==
- List of communities in Newfoundland and Labrador
- List of designated places in Newfoundland and Labrador
- List of local service districts in Newfoundland and Labrador
