= Milltown, Virginia =

Unincorporated community in Virginia, United States

- Unincorporated community
- Location within Northern Virginia Location within Virginia Location within the United States
- Coordinates: 39°14′07″N 77°37′33″W
- Country: United States
- State: Virginia
- County: Loudoun
- Time zone: UTC−5 (Eastern (EST))
  - Summer (DST): UTC−4 (EDT)

Milltown (formerly, Milton) is an unincorporated community in Loudoun County, Virginia, United States. It lies at an elevation of 394 feet (120 m).
