= Harcourt, Newfoundland and Labrador =

Village in Canada

Coordinates: 48°12′00″N 53°52′00″W

Harcourt is a village located northeast of Clarenville. It was formerly named Sandy Point. It had a population of 120 in 1956. Harcourt is located in a non-tax district.
