= Weybridge, Newfoundland and Labrador =

Settlement in Newfoundland and Labrador, Canada

Coordinates: 48.103°N 53.880°W

Location of Weybridge in Newfoundland and Labrador

Weybridge is a settlement in Newfoundland and Labrador.
