= Burgoyne's Cove =

Local service district in Newfoundland and Labrador, Canada

Coordinates: 48.170°N 53.714°W

Location of Burgoyne's Cove in Newfoundland and Labrador

Burgoyne's Cove is a local service district and designated place in the Canadian province of Newfoundland and Labrador.

Burgoyne's Cove is located on the east coast of Newfoundland, approximately 224 kilometres from the capital city of St. John's. It is located in Smith Sound within Trinity Bay, north of Random Island.

The deep, sheltered coves in the area provide an ideal environment for cod and other fish to flourish in numbers. Smith Sound is one of the key breeding grounds for the Atlantic cod in Newfoundland and Labrador. High, sharp cliffs of slate dominate the coastline and dense forests of spruce and fir trees blanket the interior.

Three communities fall within the municipality, Clifton, New Burnt Cove, and Burgoyne's Cove itself (listed west to east). The approximate population of Burgoyne's Cove is 100, but that varies because many people live there seasonally.

Children in Burgoyne's Cove from grades kindergarten to grade 6 commute to the main service town of Clarenville to attend Riverside Elementary. High students from grade 7-9 attend Clarenville Middle School and students from grade 10-12 attend Clarenville Integrated High (formerly Horwood High School).

Burgoyne's Cove was first settled by British immigrants coming over from England to take advantage of the fishing, logging, and to mine slate (of which there is a very large deposit). A British general, John Burgoyne, who fought in the Revolutionary War and also served for several months in Newfoundland in the late 1700s, lent his name to the new community.

== History ==
On 18 March 1953, Brigadier General Richard E. Ellsworth was co-piloting a Convair RB-36H Peacemaker bomber on a 25-hour journey as part of a simulated combat mission flying from Lajes, Azores back to the Rapid City Air Force Base. As part of their exercise, the bomber's crew was observing radio silence and had switched off their radar guidance, flying via celestial navigation. They had planned to fly low over the ocean, steadily increasing to higher altitudes before reaching the mountainous countryside of Newfoundland.

Late into the night, the aircraft struck bad weather and went off course, reaching Newfoundland 90 minutes earlier than planned. At 4:10 am near Burgoyne's Cove, with sleet, fog, freezing drizzle, and visibility estimated at less than 1/8-mile (200 m), the plane struck an 896-foot (273 m) hill at 800 feet (244 m) with a ground speed of 202 knots (374 km/h; 232 mph). The aircraft's propellers severed the tops of pine trees while the plane's left wing hit the ground, tore off, and spilled fuel. The rest of the plane impacted some thousand feet (300 m) further. The impact and subsequent fire from the plane's fuel tanks scorched an 8-foot-deep (2.4 m) trench in the countryside. Loggers on a nearby hill spotted the fireball and alerted rescuers, but all 23 on board were killed on impact. That same night, a Boeing SB-29 Superfortress search and rescue plane was sent out to assist in search efforts, but crashed two hundred miles (320 km) west in St. George's Bay.

== Geography ==
Burgoynes Cove is in Newfoundland within Subdivision K of Division No. 7.

== Demographics ==
As a designated place in the 2016 Census of Population conducted by Statistics Canada, Burgoynes Cove recorded a population of 126 living in 58 of its 82 total private dwellings, a change of -1.6% from its 2011 population of 128. With a land area of 12.17 km^{2} (4.70 sq mi), it had a population density of 10.4/km^{2} (26.8/sq mi) in 2016.

== Government ==
Burgoynes Cove is a local service district (LSD) that is governed by a committee responsible for the provision of certain services to the community. The chair of the LSD committee is Ralph Froude.

== See also ==
- List of communities in Newfoundland and Labrador
- List of designated places in Newfoundland and Labrador
- List of local service districts in Newfoundland and Labrador
