= Milton, Newfoundland and Labrador =

Designated place in Canada

Milton
- Designated place
- Location of Milton Milton (Canada)
- Coordinates: 48°12′58″N 53°57′47″W
- Country: Canada
- Province: Newfoundland and Labrador
- Region: Newfoundland
- Census division: 7
- Census subdivision: K

Government
  - Type: Unincorporated

Area
  - Land: 3.05 km^{2} (1.18 sq mi)

Population (2016)
  - Total: 410
- Time zone: UTC−03:30 (NST)
  - Summer (DST): UTC−02:30 (NDT)
- Area code: 709

Milton is a designated place in the Canadian province of Newfoundland and Labrador that is a neighbourhood within the Town of George's Brook-Milton. Originally named King's Cove, it changed its name to Milton (it is believed after the poet John Milton) in 1910.

== History ==
The community was originally settled in 1869 after two previous "wintering-over" by Wm. James Adams and his four sons and three of his four daughters. They came to the area from Old Perlican on the east side of Trinity Bay. It has always been a logging town and at its height in the 1930s possessed four water-powered and 8 gas-powered saw mills. The only remnants of its logging history is found in the name of the small brook that runs through the town called "the Saw Pit Brook". At another point in its history it was also a siding for the branch railway line to Bonivista. This element was run by Mr. Herbert Adams.

The family was originally settled by this Adams clan (who descended from the Scottish Highlands) and descendants of these four brothers are still scattered throughout the community to this day. The community has seen 6 generations of the family make its home here.

Other industries that have existed here were a Brick Manufacturing plant (the only one in NL until its closure in the 1970s). It was also the starting point of the cross country explored Wm Epps Cormack and his traveling companion Joseph Sylvester where they began their trek across the provinces interior in 1832.

Most importantly, a series of "transatlantic cables have in the past landed in the general area (the first telegraph cable was landed at Heart's Content in 1866 and the first international telephone cable in Clarenville in 1955). The current Greenland Connect cable landed in Milton itself in 2009, connecting Eastlink network to Greenland and thence to far Northern European network exchange points via Iceland. It provides an alternative to the more southerly Hibernia Atlantic cable from Halifax or Emerald Express and is on a route that could in theory connect to Russian or Far Eastern destinations via Arctic great circles, to complete a global transocean fibre loop.

The community has since evolved into a bedroom community to the Clarenville area. In 2017, residents of Milton and the neighbouring community of George's Brook voted in favour of joining to incorporate as a town. The Town of George's Brook-Milton was officially incorporated by the provincial government on May 8, 2018.

== Geography ==
Milton is in Newfoundland within Subdivision K of Division No. 7. It is on the shores of the inner reaches of Smith Sound on Route 230A, which starts at Clarenville and continues to the intersection at Route 230.

== Demographics ==
As a designated place in the 2016 Census of Population conducted by Statistics Canada, Milton recorded a population of 410 living in 171 of its 187 total private dwellings, a change of −4.7% from its 2011 population of 430. With a land area of 3.05 km^{2} (1.18 sq mi), it had a population density of 134.4/km^{2} (348.2/sq mi) in 2016.

== See also ==
- List of communities in Newfoundland and Labrador
- List of designated places in Newfoundland and Labrador
