= George's Brook, Newfoundland and Labrador =

Designated place in Canada

Coordinates: 48.2291683°N 53.9646935°W

George's Brook is a designated place in the Canadian province of Newfoundland and Labrador that is a neighbourhood in the Town of George's Brook-Milton. It is north of Clarenville.

== History ==
The community had a population of 170 in 1935, which has increased to 252 in 1961 and 280 in 1966. A post office opened in George's Brook in 1950 with its first postmistress being Mona Pelley. In October 1985, the community got it first waymaster, Charles Pelley.

In 2017, residents of George's Brook and the neighbouring community of Milton voted in favour of joining together to incorporate as a town. The Town of George's Brook-Milton was officially incorporated by the provincial government on May 8, 2018.

== Geography ==
George's Brook is in Newfoundland within Subdivision K of Division No. 7.

== Demographics ==
As a designated place in the 2016 Census of Population conducted by Statistics Canada, George's Brook recorded a population of 358 living in 142 of its 155 total private dwellings, a change of 6.9% from its 2011 population of 335. With a land area of 4.49 km^{2} (1.73 sq mi), it had a population density of 79.7/km^{2} (206.5/sq mi) in 2016.

== See also ==
- List of communities in Newfoundland and Labrador
- List of designated places in Newfoundland and Labrador
