= Random Island =

Island in Newfoundland, Canada

Random Head Lighthouse
- Location: Random Head; Random Island; Newfoundland; Canada
- Coordinates: 48°05′41″N 53°32′43″W

Tower
- Constructed: 1895
- Foundation: concrete base
- Construction: cast iron tower
- Height: 10 m (33 ft)
- Shape: cylindrical tower with balcony and lantern
- Markings: red and white checkered pattern, red lantern
- Power source: solar power
- Operator: Canadian Coast Guard
- Heritage: recognized federal heritage building of Canada

Light
- Focal height: 38 m (125 ft)
- Range: 7 nmi (13 km; 8.1 mi)
- Characteristic: Fl W 3s

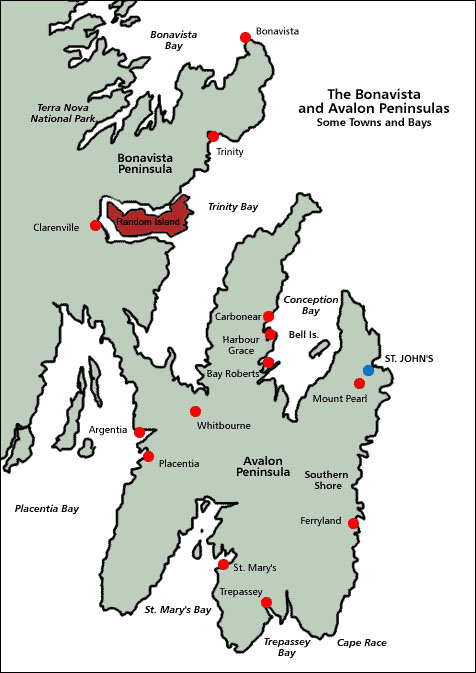
Random Island (in red), surrounded by Bonavista Peninsula and Trinity Bay. St. John's, the provincial capital, is to the southeast.

Random Island is an island located off Canada's Atlantic coast. Part of the Province of Newfoundland and Labrador, it is located on the east coast of Newfoundland and partially surrounded by the Bonavista Peninsula to the north and within the confines of Trinity Bay. The island is approximately 35 km (22 mi) long, its width varies from 15 km (9.3 mi) on the eastern end, to 6 km (3.7 mi) in the middle, to 17 km (11 mi) on the western end, with a total area of around 310 km^{2} (120 sq mi). According to the 2016 census, the population of the island is 1,232.

== Geography ==
Situated in northwest Trinity Bay, it is separated from Newfoundland by Smith Sound on the north and the Northwest Arm of Random Sound on the south and west. It is not circumnavigable except by small boats, as Random Bar (a bar that runs from its northwest corner to Newfoundland) separates the two sounds. The Hefferton Causeway (now Route 231 (Random Island Road)) was built in 1954 across Random Bar, linking the island with the nearby town of Clarenville.

== Education ==
Random Island has one school, Random Island Academy (was Random Island integrated), which educates students from kindergarten to Grade 12. The school's student body has been steadily declining since its high of 445 students in 1982, and by 1996 it had only 213 students. In the 2005/06 school year, the Eastern School District was considering shutting Random Island Academy down in the year 2009 because of its small population. The school is still running now. As of 2016 it currently has 115 students.

Random Island Academy was founded in 1973, and originally only served the younger students. High school students had been bused across Random Bar to Clarenville before 1973. However, due to parents' protests, the academy was eventually upgraded to accommodate all students.

== Communities ==
Random Island consists of the following eleven communities:

- Random Heights
- Elliott's Cove
- Snooks Harbour
- Aspen Brook
- Weybridge
- Lady Cove
- Robinson Bight
- Hickman's Harbour
- Britannia
- Lower Lance Cove
- Petley

These communities have undergone name changes over the history of the island, and in some cases have become somewhat consolidated. For example, Petley includes the area known as Aspen (Apsey) Cove, often considered its own community, and Weybridge has in the past been known as Fosters Point. Most of these communities, despite their tiny size, have histories of over 100 years. However, Random Heights and Robinson Bight are relatively recent in their development as communities.

Other communities have ceased to exist due to natural or artificial conditions. Ryder's Harbour is considered one of the founding communities, but ceased to exist due to natural evolution away from it, while Deer Harbour was a victim of government resettlement policies in the 1960s.

== History ==
Indigenous peoples such as the Beothuk inhabited Newfoundland for thousands of years. They usually lived along the coastlines, but retreated to the interior upon the arrival of Europeans. They were unable to avoid interactions, and experienced population decline due to new diseases, loss of access to important food sources, and violence from colonizers. They were declared extinct by 1829.

Random Island's first European colonial settlement, Ryder's Harbour, was founded in the 1760s. The site, located at the northeastern terminus of the island, was previously visited often by the many fishing expeditions from Trinity. Deer Harbor and Thoroughfare were settled nearby in the 1800s as fishing traffic to Random Island grew. On the western side of the island, settlers began arriving in the 1850s, mostly from the southern end of Trinity Bay. Soon thereafter, settlement took place on the southern portion of island, becoming Hickman's Harbour.

By 1900, Hickman's Harbour, the site of the best deep-water anchorage, had become the centre of the Random Island fishing and shipbuilding industries. Other methods of employment include sawmilling and slate mining, though the actual quarry was across the sound in Nut Cove. This quarry was closed in 1907, though it reopened in 1990. In western Random Island, the communities were primarily based on clay mining for brickmaking, and later, shale.

The population of Random Island had risen to past 1000 by 1901, with Hickman's Harbour being the most populous community at 309 people. However, the industries that had supported Random Island for over a hundred years began to collapse in the early 20th century. Both slate quarrying and fishing had declined drastically, and as a result, shipbuilding and sawmilling also went down. Many residents moved to nearby Clarenville, while others were commuted off the island for their employment.

Constructing the Hefferton Causeway, followed by road upgrades, greatly facilitated travel to Clarenville and the rest of Newfoundland. Deer Harbour and Thoroughfare were resettled when it was decided in the 1960s not to link them to the roads. The population continued to rise slowly, and in 1986 the island's population reached just over 1500. Hickman's Harbour continued to be the largest community, with a population of 479. Apart from some fishing and sawmilling, few residents were employed on Random Island itself, more working at Clarenville or farther afield.

According to Dirk Septer in his book "Lost Nuke: The Last Flight of Bomber 075", Heritage House Victoria,(2016) ISBN 9781772031294, a United States Air Force B-36, en route from the Azores to South Dakota, crashed at Nut Cove on March 18, 1953. A total of 22 crew members died including Brigadier General Richard E. Ellsworth after whom the American Air Base Rapid City South Dakota, is now named. A propeller is situated as a memorial to the deceased.

== Northwest Arm ==
Location of Northwest Arm in Newfoundland

Northwest Arm is a natural arm of approximately 20 miles in length and average of 1 mile wide located on the south side of Random Island at the inner region of Trinity Bay in the Canadian province of Newfoundland and Labrador.

Together with Smith Sound it makes a continuous channel which is the longest inshore waterway in the province at approximately 44 miles.

== See also ==
- List of lighthouses in Canada
