= Arthur Aston (governor) =

Canadian politician

Sir Arthur Aston (died 1627) was appointed Proprietary Governor of Avalon in 1625 by Sir George Calvert (1579-1632), former Secretary of State for Foreign Affairs to King James I of England (and earlier James VI of Scotland), (later titled first Baron and Lord Baltimore in Ireland and received charter from King Charles I of the Kingdom of England in 1632 just before his death to found colonial Province of Maryland further south along the Chesapeake Bay in future United States of America, carried out in 1634 by his eldest son/heir Cecilius Calvert, second Baron and Lord Baltimore (1605-1675) and his nephew, Leonard Calvert (1606-1647), the first provincial Governor of Maryland.

Aston was a devout Roman Catholic and was recommended by Father Stout to govern the Catholic colony. Aston arrived in Ferryland, Avalon's capital, around 1626 but returned to England the next year to resign his position and join the forces of the George Villiers, first Duke of Buckingham in France, where he died the same year.
