= Erasmus Stourton =

Erasmus Stourton (1603, Narborough, Leicestershire, England – November 1658, Walesby, Lincolnshire, England) was a clergyman and early settler to the Colony of Avalon, Newfoundland in 1627. He is known as one of the earliest Anglican clergyman to come to North America.

Stourton matriculated from St John's College, Cambridge, in 1619 at the age of sixteen and graduated with a Bachelor of Arts in 1623. He was ordained September 1625 and in 1627 received his MA. Stourton went to Newfoundland in 1627 as chaplain for the Sir George Calvert's colonists at Ferryland. Both he and Calvert did not see eye-to-eye on many things and was consequently banned from the colony in 1628 on Calvert's orders. Calvert calls him "an audacious man, a narrow-minded sectary, and a troublesome meddlesome busy-body". On his return to England, he had complained to the Privy Council to no avail.

Stourton became chaplain to Christopher Villiers, Earl of Anglesey, and rector of Walesby in Lincolnshire from 1631 to 1658.
