= Mobile Bay (Newfoundland and Labrador) =

Natural bay in Newfoundland and Labrador, Canada

Coordinates: 47.249°N 52.831°W

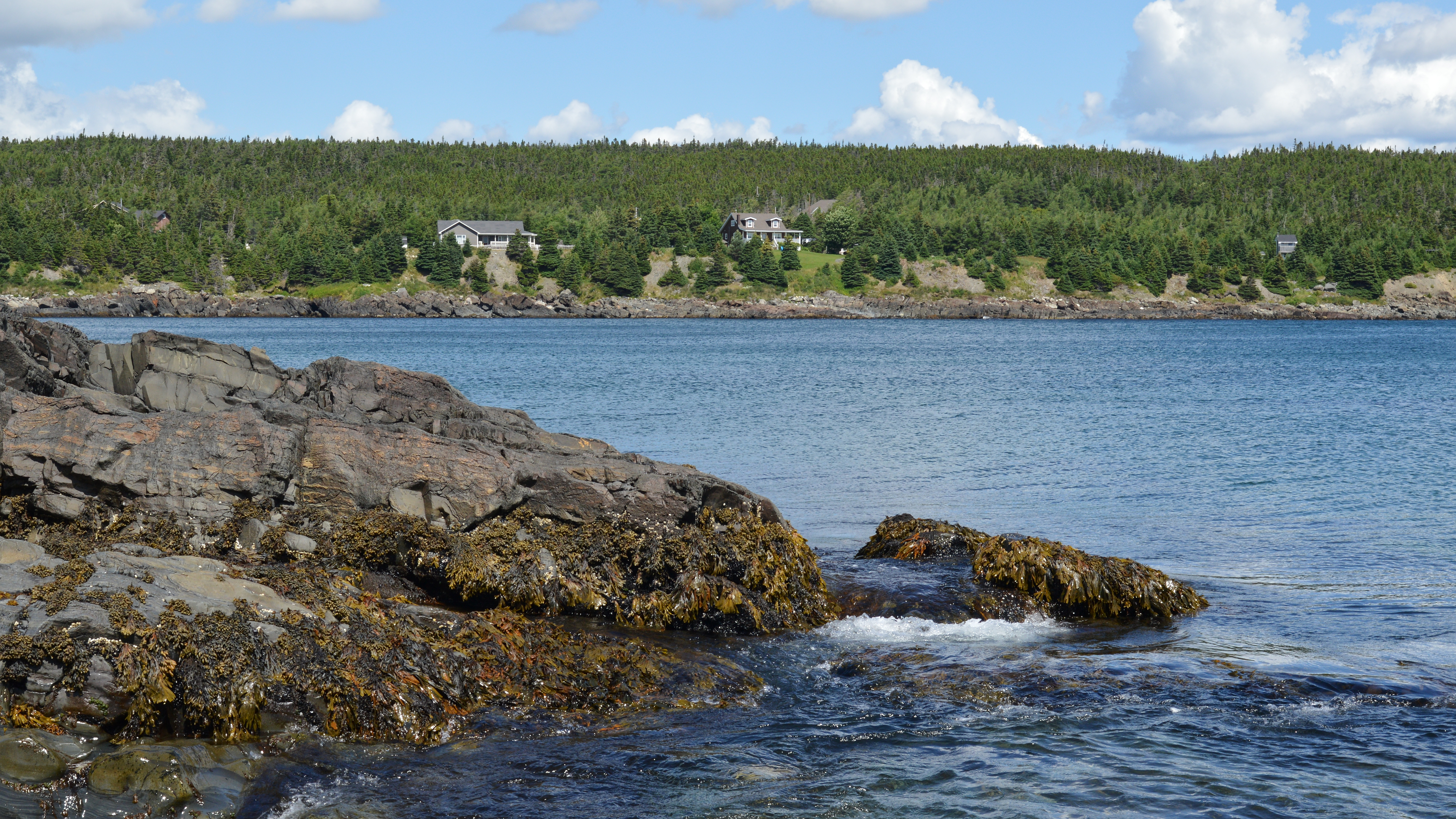
Mobile Bay

Mobile Bay is a natural bay off the island of Newfoundland in the province of Newfoundland and Labrador, Canada. It is on the eastern shore of the Avalon Peninsula.
