= Cambriol =

Welsh colony in North America

Coordinates: 46.916°N 53.231°W

Cambriol or New Cambriol was the name given to one of North America's early Welsh colonies established by Sir William Vaughan (1575–1641). The area Vaughan had purchased from the Company of Adventurers to Newfoundland in 1616 was all that land on the Avalon Peninsula located south of a line drawn from Caplin Bay (now Calvert) to Placentia Bay (near present-day Gooseberry Cove). Vaughan had called the area New Cambriol — "a little Wales" in the New World. In his book The Golden Fleece, an allegory in praise of his colony, makes the following assertion concerning Cambriol:

This is our Colchos, where the Golden Fleece flourisheth on the backes of Neptunes sheepe, continually to be shorne. This is Great Britaines Indies, never to be exhausted dry.

— The Golden Fleece

== History ==
Sir William Vaughan, a poet and colonizer, was deeply concerned with the prevailing economic conditions of Wales in the early 17th century and became interested in establishing a colony in Newfoundland. In 1617–1618 he had obtained the services of Richard Whitbourne and sent out settlers to his new colony, at his own expense, to establish roots there. His naming of the area as Cambriol, was a gesture of good will for his native country Wales where he envisaged a new country for his fellow countrymen "reserved by God for us Britons" and as eloquently portrayed in the verse by fellow colonizer John Guy:

New Cambriol's planter, sprung from Golden Grove, Old Cambria's soil up to the skies doth raise, For which let Fame crown him with sacred bays.

— John Guy

Vaughan had sent a number of settlers in 1617 with every good intention of making the maiden voyage himself and settling in his new colony with them. Because of ill health, Vaughan was not able to do so. Then in 1618 he requested Sir Richard Whitbourne to take on the task of colonizing Cambriol and in return offered him governorship, which he accepted. Two vessels were charter by Whitbourne to make the voyage. One of the vessels, which carried a crew of fisherman for the colony, was waylaid by pirates and was never regained. This was the first of many setbacks to the longevity of the colony. As evidence in Whitbourne's letter back to Vaughan in 1618 where he informs us:

I sayled thither in a shippe of my own which was victualled by that gentleman myself and some others. We likewise did set forth another shippe for a fishing voyage which also carried some victuals for those people which had been formerly sent to inhabit there, but this ship was intercepted by an English erring captaine (a pirate) that went forth with Sir Walter Rawleigh.....whereby the fishing voyage of both our shippes was overthrown and the Plantation hindered.

— Letter to Sir William Vaughan, 1618 by Sir Richard Withbourne.

Upon arrival at Cambriol, Whitbourne was not pleased with the progress of the original settlers and sent all but six back to Wales citing a complete lack of pioneering initiative and thorough laziness. Withbourne was harsh and vitriolic in his description of the work the settlers had done in the year since they first arrived as can be seen in his correspondence to Vaughan:

For certainly I have already seen and known by experience that the desired plantation can never be made beneficial by such idle fellows as I found there in 1618 when I was there with the power by virtue of a graunte from the Patentees, which people had remained there a whole yeere before I came theare or knew any or them and never applied themselves to any commendable thing, or not so much as to make themselves a house to lodge in, but lay in such cold and simple rooms all the winter as the fisherman had formerly built there for their necessary occasions the yeere before those men arrived there.

— Letter to Sir William Vaughan, 1618 by Sir Richard Withbourne.

With the loss of population, Vaughan was obligated to hand over the northern part of his colony (Fermeuse area) to Lord Falkland and to Lord Baltimore the area around Ferryland.

== Vaughan at New Cambriol ==
Vaughan did eventually arrive at his colony in 1622 and during his three or four years stay wrote The Golden Fleece in an effort to stimulate the colonists into hard work. He returned to Britain to arrange publication of his work and returned to New Cambriol in 1628. The colony suffered terribly over the next few years due to harsh weather conditions and the constant destruction of property at the hands of the French and other Grand Bank fishermen.

Vaughan had returned to his native Wales in 1630 to settle his financial affairs and at the same time to convince his brother-in-law Sir Henry Salusbury of Denbigh and other "gentlemen of Wales" to join him in his colony at New Cambriol. Vaughan had offered grants of land but no one took him up on the offer.

== Dissolution of colony ==
No other information is available to determine if Vaughan had returned to his colony New Cambriol after 1630, but his efforts to entice further colonization did not cease. In 1630 he published a medical handbook entitled Newlander's Cure, whereby it contained advice for colonists on the preservation of health.

All efforts to increase colonization had failed and sometime between 1630 and 1637 the colony was abandoned. At that time Vaughan was nearly sixty years old and he had given up any further attempts of colonization. In 1637 the Privy Council was informed of its failure and the failure of other colonies in Newfoundland.

Then in 1637 Sir David Kirke and his partners were given a royal charter giving them possession of Newfoundland with Kirke as Proprietary Governor. This charter superseded all other earlier charters granted to the earlier colonizers of the Avalon Peninsula, as they were deemed to have been abandoned.
