= Newfoundland Colony =

1610–1907 English/British colony in North America

Newfoundland
- 1610–1907
- Top: Flag (1862–1870); Bottom: Flag (1870–1904) Escutcheon

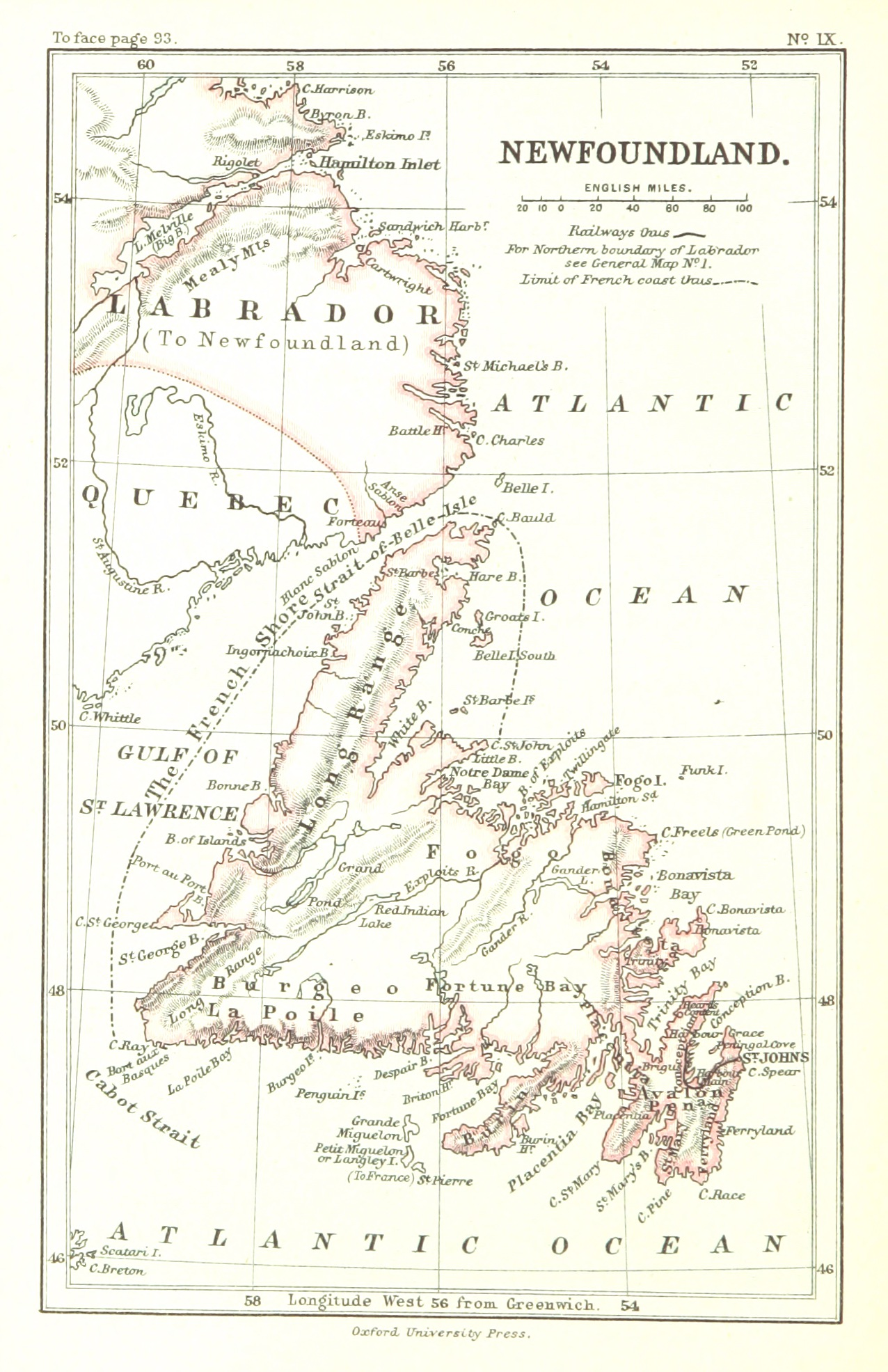
- Map of Newfoundland Colony (1891)
- Status: Colony of England (1610–1707); Colony of Great Britain (1707–1801); Colony of the United Kingdom (1801–1907)
- Official languages: English
- Minority languages: Newfoundland French • Newfoundland Irish
- Religion: Church of England
- Monarch
  - 1610–1625: James I (first)
  - 1901–1907: Edward VII (last)
- Governor
- History
  - English Colonization of Newfoundland: 1610
  - Dominion of Newfoundland established: 1907
- Currency: Newfoundland pound (until 1865); Newfoundland dollar (1865 onwards)
Preceded by	Succeeded by
Lower Canada; Beothuk	Dominion of Newfoundland
- Today part of: Canada; Newfoundland and Labrador

Newfoundland was an English, and later British, colony established in 1610 on the island of Newfoundland, in modern-day Canada. That followed decades of sporadic English settlement on the island, which was at first only seasonal. Newfoundland was made a Crown colony in 1824 and a dominion in 1907. Its economy collapsed during the Great Depression. On 16 February 1934, the Newfoundland legislature agreed to the creation of a six-member Commission of Government to govern the country. In 1948, the country voted to join Canada as the province of Newfoundland, taking effect in 1949.

== History ==
Indigenous people like the Beothuk (known as the Skræling in Greenlandic Norse), and Innu were the first inhabitants of Newfoundland and Labrador. During the late 15th century, European explorers like João Fernandes Lavrador, Gaspar Corte-Real, John Cabot, Jacques Cartier and others began visiting the area. From around the beginning of the 16th century, fishing vessels with English, Portuguese, French and Spanish crews started visiting on a seasonal basis. At some point during the early 16th Century, some of these fishing crews founded an informal settlement at Placentia. The Beothuk gradually became extinct as a people, as they experienced a population decline as a result of infectious diseases introduced by European colonists and the loss of their ancestral territory due to colonial settlement.

From 1610 onwards, English colonists established colonial settlements in Newfoundland, led by proprietary governors, as England tried to create North American footholds. John Guy was governor of the first settlement at Cuper's Cove. Other settlements were Bristol's Hope, Renews, New Cambriol, South Falkland and Avalon, which was organized as a province in 1623. The first governor given jurisdiction over all of Newfoundland was Sir David Kirke in 1638. During this period, France had also established settlements in the region, particularly to the west in what is now Quebec. It had strong trading ties to many of the indigenous peoples along the Atlantic Coast, including the Mi'kmaq and other Algonquian-speaking peoples.

The rivalry between England and France in Europe was played out in conflicts in North America, where they struggled for predominance. This was particularly true in Newfoundland, where the English colonial settlements on the eastern coasts were in close proximity to the French claims in Southern Newfoundland, which the French dubbed Plaisance. The Newfoundland colony was nearly obliterated during the Avalon Peninsula Campaign of King William's War, the North American theatre of the Nine Years' War (1688–1697). In 1696, the French and allied Mi'kmaq armed forces wiped out all but a handful of English settlements on the island of Newfoundland. Over the next year, the English repopulated and rebuilt the colony. Under the terms of the Treaty of Utrecht in 1713 France ceded all Newfoundland to Great Britain.

Given the Newfoundland colony's isolation from the more southern British colonies in America (and proximity to the still-loyal colony of Nova Scotia), it did not become involved in the colonial rebellion of the 1770s. After the American Revolutionary War ended in 1783 with the independence of the United States, Newfoundland Colony became part of British North America. The Crown resettled some Loyalists in Newfoundland, but most were given land in Nova Scotia and present-day Ontario. In 1809, the British Imperial government detached Labrador from Lower Canada for transfer to the Newfoundland Colony.

It became an official Crown colony in 1825, and Thomas John Cochrane, an officer of the Royal Navy, was appointed as its first governor. He directed the construction of Government House, which is located between the sites of Fort William and Fort Townshend. All three have been designated National Historic Sites. The colony was granted a constitution in 1832, and Cochrane became its first civil governor.

The colony was granted self-governing status in 1854. Philip Francis Little was the first premier of Newfoundland between 1855 and 1858. The country rejected confederation with Canada in the period between 1864 and 1869. In 1907, Newfoundland became the Dominion of Newfoundland, a dominion of the British Empire. Due to economic hardship in 1934, the Newfoundland legislature accepted rule by a Commission Government comprising six members (three from Britain and three from Newfoundland) appointed by the British government. In two national referendums, Newfoundlanders and Labradorians voted to become part of Canada in 1948. On April 1, 1949, it became the Province of Newfoundland.

== See also ==
- British Empire
- Dominion of Newfoundland
- History of Newfoundland and Labrador
- Newfoundland (island)
- Newfoundland and Labrador
- List of lieutenant governors of Newfoundland and Labrador
