= Ferryland =

- Town
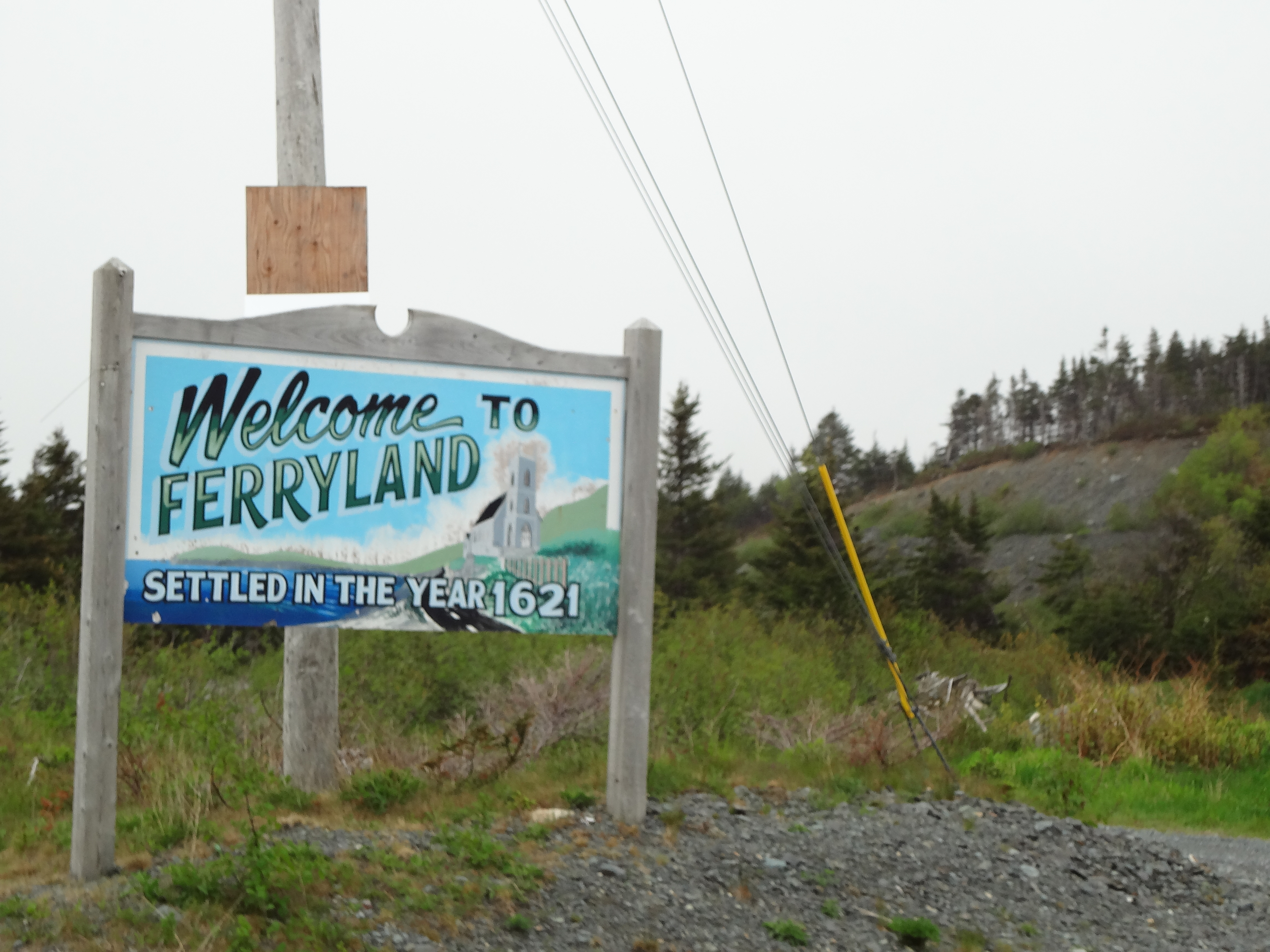
- Welcome sign

- Seal
- Motto(s): "Tolerance, Courage, Endurance"
- Location of Ferryland in Newfoundland
- Coordinates: 47°01′N 52°53′W
- Country: Canada
- Province: Newfoundland and Labrador
- Settled: 1621

Government
  - Type: Town Council
  - Mayor: Aidan Costello

Area
  - Total: 13.62 km^{2} (5.26 sq mi)
- Elevation: 48 m (157 ft)

Population (2021)
  - Total: 371
  - Density: 30.4/km^{2} (79/sq mi)
- Time zone: UTC-3:30 (Newfoundland Time)
  - Summer (DST): UTC-2:30 (Newfoundland Daylight)
- Postal code span: A0A
- Area code: 709
- Highways: Route 10
- Website: https://www.townofferryland.com/

Ferryland is a town in Newfoundland and Labrador on the Avalon Peninsula. According to the 2021 Statistics Canada census, its population is 371.

== Seventeenth century settlement ==
Ferryland was originally established as a station for migratory fishermen in the late 16th century but had earlier been used by the French, Spanish, and Portuguese. By the 1590s it was one of the most popular fishing harbours in Newfoundland and acclaimed by Sir Walter Raleigh. Ferryland was called "Farilham" by the Portuguese fishermen and "Forillon" by the French—it later became anglicized to its current name "Ferryland." (This should not be confused with the Forillon National Park in Quebec, which still keeps its French name.)

The land was granted by charter to the London and Bristol Company in the 1610s and the vicinity became the location of a number of short-lived English colonies at Cuper's Cove, Bristol's Hope, and Renews and adjoined the colony of South Falkland. In 1620 the territory was granted to George Calvert, 1st Baron Baltimore who had obtained the holdings from William Vaughan. Calvert appointed Edward Wynne to establish a colony which became the first successful permanent colony in Newfoundland growing to a population of 100 by 1625. In 1623, Calvert's grant was confirmed and expanded. The Charter of Avalon was granted to Lord Baltimore by James I. Dated 7 April 1623 it created the Province of Avalon on the island of Newfoundland and gave Baltimore complete authority over all matters in the territory. That same year Baltimore chose Ferryland as the principal area of settlement. In the 1660s, the colony was attacked by the Dutch.

The town was destroyed by New France in 1696 during the Avalon Peninsula Campaign of King William's War. Virtually forgotten for centuries, excavations of the original settlement began in earnest in the late 1980s and continue to this day.

== Historic designations ==
The site of the 17th-century Colony of Avalon was designated a National Historic Site of Canada in 1953. It was also designated a Municipal Heritage District in 1998.

The Historic Ferryland Museum was designated a Municipal Heritage Site in 2006.

== Demographics ==
In the 2021 census conducted by Statistics Canada, Ferryland had a population of 371 living in 191 of its 252 total private dwellings, a change of −10.4% from its 2016 population of 414. With a land area of 13.22 km^{2} (5.10 sq mi), it had a population density of 28.1/km^{2} (72.7/sq mi) in 2021.

== Gallery ==
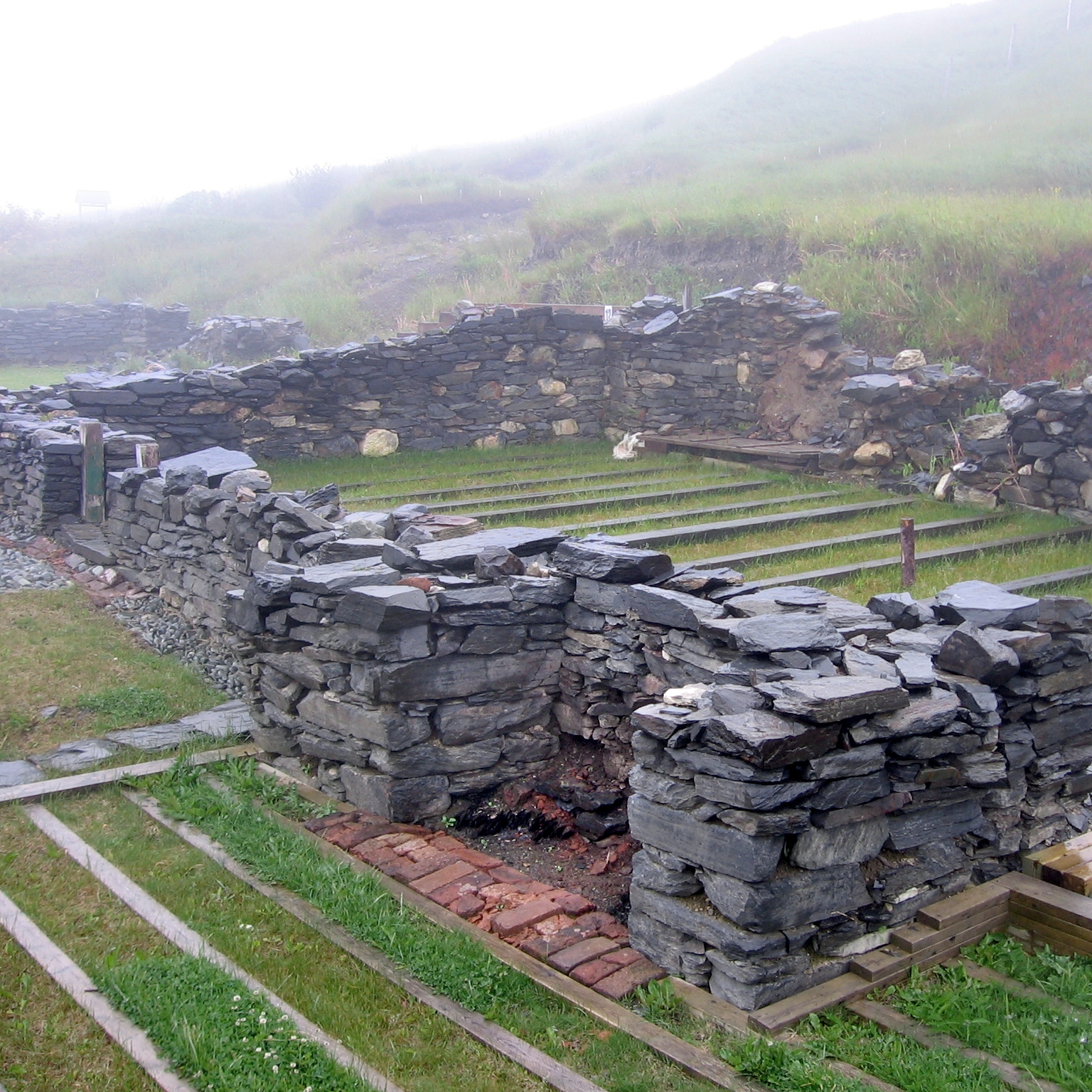
Excavated foundation of mansion house.

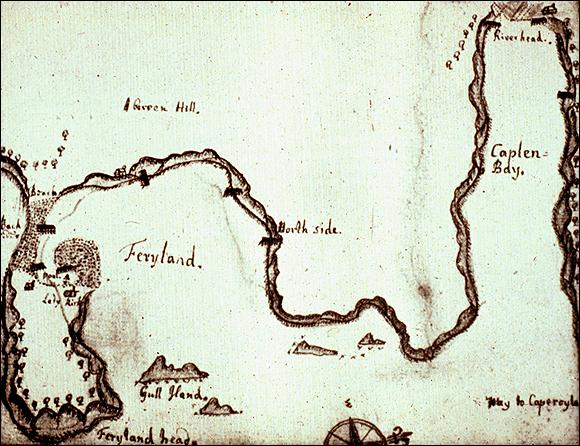
Map of Ferryland in 1663

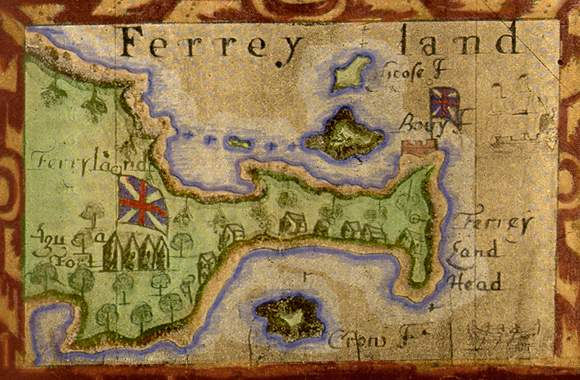
Map of Ferryland in 1693

== See also ==
- List of lighthouses in Canada
- British colonization of the Americas
- List of municipalities in Newfoundland and Labrador
- Sara Kirke
- Erasmus Stourton
- Ron Hynes
- James Tuck (archaeologist)
