= William Vaughan (writer) =

Welsh writer (died 1641)

Sir William Vaughan (c. 1575 – August 1641) was a Welsh writer in English and Latin. He promoted colonization in Newfoundland, but with mixed success.

== Early life ==
He was the son of Walter Vaughan (died 1598) and was born at Golden Grove (Gelli Aur), Llanfihangel Aberbythych, Carmarthenshire, Wales—the estate of his father, through whom he was descended from an ancient prince of Powys. He was brother to John Vaughan, 1st Earl of Carbery (1572−1634) and Henry Vaughan (1587−1659), a well-known Royalist leader in the English Civil War. William was educated at Jesus College, Oxford, where he matriculated on 4 February 1592, and graduated BA on 1 March 1595, MA on 16 November 1597. He supplicated for the law degree of BCL on 3 December 1600, but before taking its examination he went abroad, travelled in France and Italy, and visited Vienna, where he proceeded LlD, being incorporated at Oxford on 23 June 1605.

== Newfoundland ==
In 1616 he bought a grant of land, the southern Avalon Peninsula (from Calvert to Placentia Bay) of the island of Newfoundland, from the London and Bristol Company. In 1617 he sent Welsh colonists to Renews to establish a permanent colony, which he called Cambriol; it eventually failed. The colonists were ill-equipped, without an experienced leader, and had built for themselves mere shacks for shelter for the winter. In 1618 Vaughan sent out a second batch of settlers under the command of Richard Whitbourne, whom he appointed governor for life of the undertaking.

By 1619 Vaughan signed over part of his grant to Henry Cary. Vaughan's brother had convinced him to also to give up a portion of his tract to George Calvert, the area around Ferryland. In this area George Calvert established his Colony of Avalon. Vaughan retained the southern portion of his tract, determined by a line drawn from Renews to Placentia Bay, an area that included Trepassey. Further attempts to colonize Trepassey on two occasions had also failed. After the return of Whitbourne, Vaughan visited his colony in 1622, and returned to England in 1625, bringing with him two works ready for publication.

Vaughan apparently paid another visit to Cambriol, but his plans for its prosperity were foiled by the severe winters. In 1628 he transferred his interests to the colony of Virginia. He died at his house of Torcoed, Carmarthenshire, in August 1641. In his will he gave instructions that he should be buried "without vaine pomp in the Churchyard of Llangendeirne". The location of his grave in the churchyard is unknown, but in a service held in Llangyndeyrn church on 31 October 1987 a memorial tablet to Vaughan was unveiled by George Noakes, Archbishop of Wales at the time.

== Works ==
His chief work is The Golden Fleece (1600), under the pseudonym "Orpheus Junior", "a general guide to morals, politics and literature, in which the manners of the time are severely criticized, plays being denounced as folly and wickedness". The section in praise of poetry borrows much from earlier writers on the subject.

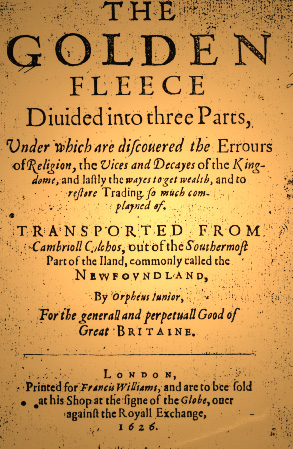
Title page from The Golden Fleece (1626).

The Golden Fleece... transported from Cambriol Colchis, by Orpheus Junior (1626) is the most interesting of his other works. A long and fantastic prose allegory, it demonstrates "the Errours of Religion, the Vices and Decayes of the Kingdome, and lastly the wayes to get wealth, and to restore Trading" through the colonization of Newfoundland. After returning from Newfoundland he published two devotional works,The Church from the Time of our Saviour to 1640 and The Soules Exercise.

== Views on Welsh culture ==
William Vaughan like many members of his class in this period of Welsh history, took pleasure in the dissolution of Welsh national distinctiveness. ""I rejoice." he said, "that the memorial of Offa's Dyke is extinguished with love and charity: that our green leeks, sometimes offensive to your dainty nostrils, are now tempered with your fragrant roses""
