= Edward Wynne (colonial administrator) =

Canadian politician

Edward Wynne was Proprietary Governor of the Ferryland colony from 1621 to 1626. Born in Wales, he was appointed by Sir George Calvert, (later, first Baron and Lord Baltimore) to establish the colony, and in August 1621, he landed at "Ferryland" with 12 men. By November of that same year, the colonists had completed a large dwelling, and then by Christmas, had added a stone kitchen. In 1622, a second group of colonists led by Daniel Powell was sent to the new English Colony, bringing the population to 32, including seven women. Within a few years, the Colony had housing, a forge, a warehouse, sawmill and wharf. In 1623, the Colony became the Province of Avalon when Calvert's grant was confirmed by King Charles I of England, growing to a population of 100 by 1625. Wynne was dismissed that year, probably because he lacked the skills to govern a growing Colony of that size and because Calvert himself wanted to govern the colony directly.
