= West Country Men =

A group of individuals in Elizabethan England who supported colonial expansion

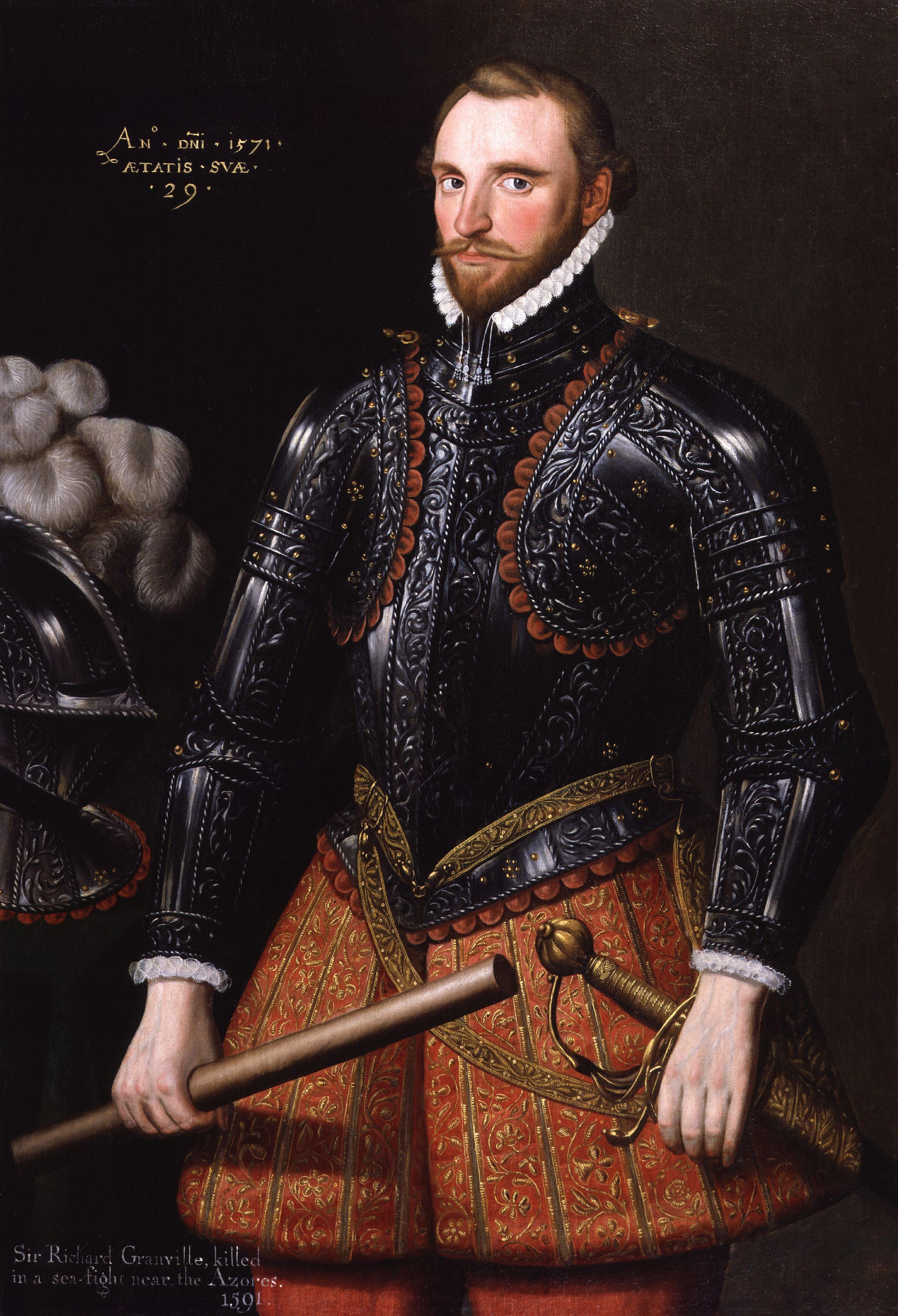
A portrait of Sir Richard Grenville

The West Country Men were a group of influential individuals in Elizabethan England who advocated the English colonisation of Munster, attacks on the Spanish Empire, and the expansion of the English Empire. The group included Sir Humphrey Gilbert, Sir Walter Raleigh, Sir Francis Drake, Sir John Hawkins, Sir Richard Grenville, and Sir Ralph Lane. Five of these individuals originated in the southwest region of England known as the West Country, and were particularly associated with the seaports of Devon, especially Plymouth.
