= South Falkland =

English colony on Newfoundland

- Location of South Falkland in Newfoundland
- Coordinates: 46°51′36″N 52°56′37″W
- Country: England
- Established: 1623

Government
  - Proprietary Governor: Sir Francis Tanfield

South Falkland was an English colony in Newfoundland established by Henry Cary, 1st Viscount Falkland, in 1623 on territory in the Avalon Peninsula including the former colony of Renews. Cary appointed Sir Francis Tanfield, his wife's cousin, to be the colony's first Proprietary Governor. Tanfield founded the colony of South Falkland at Renews in 1623. It was still in existence by 1626 but ultimately failed. The settlers are thought to have returned to England or Ireland by 1630, and Cary granted much of his land to Sir Henry Salisbury who had been Cary's only known investor.

== See also ==
- English overseas possessions
- British colonization of the Americas
