= Province of Avalon =

English settlement in Canada

Coordinates: 47.0226°N 52.8791°W

- 1610–1696
- Flag

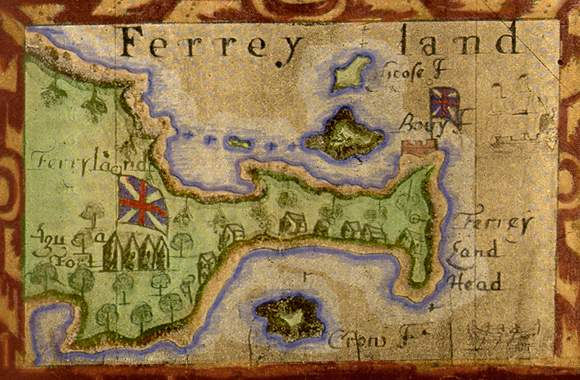
- Status: English colony
- Capital: Ferryland, Newfoundland
- Common languages: English
- Government: Constitutional monarchy
- Legislature: Lords Proprietors
- Historical era: Colonial Era
  - London and Bristol Company charter: 1610
  - Destroyed by New France in the Avalon Peninsula Campaign: 1696
- Currency: Pound sterling
Preceded by	Succeeded by
Colony of Avalon	Newfoundland Colony

The Province of Avalon was the area around the English settlement of Ferryland in what is now Newfoundland and Labrador, Canada in the 17th century, which upon the success of the colony grew to include the land held by Sir William Vaughan and all the land that lay between Ferryland and Petty Harbour.

== History ==
The Avalon Peninsula was one of the first European-inhabited areas in North America. In 1497 the Bristol Guild of Merchants financed a voyage by John Cabot to Newfoundland, where he is reported to have landed at Cape Bonavista. Basque sailors used the area as a base for whale hunting.

=== The London and Bristol Company ===
In the early 17th century English merchants began to take an interest in the Newfoundland fishery. The Bristol Society of Merchant Venturers established the London and Bristol Company (the Newfoundland Company) in 1608 and sent John Guy, to locate a favourable location for a colony. The first permanent English settlement was established at Cuper's Cove in 1610.

The company was granted a charter by James I on 2 May 1610 giving it a monopoly in agriculture, mining, fishing and hunting on the Avalon Peninsula. They retained exclusive rights until 1616 when the Crown began to grant lands to others.

=== Lord Baltimore ===
Sir George Calvert acquired a large land holding on the peninsula and hired an agent Captain Edward Wynne to set up headquarters in Ferryland. The initial colony grew to a population of 100, becoming the first successful permanent settlement on Newfoundland island. In 1620 Calvert obtained a grant from Sir William Vaughan for all of the land that lay north of a point between Fermeuse and Aquaforte to as far north as Caplin Bay (now Calvert) on the southern shore of the Avalon Peninsula.

In 1623, Calvert was given a Royal Charter extending the Royal lands and granting them the name the Province of Avalon "in imitation of Old Avalon in Somersetshire wherein Glassenbury stands, the first fruits of Christianity in Britain". The charter created the province as a palatinate in which Calvert had absolute authority. Calvert wished to make the colony a refuge for Roman Catholics facing persecution in England. In 1625 Calvert was elevated to the Peerage of Ireland as The 1st Baron Baltimore.

A series of crises and calamities led Calvert to quit the colony in 1629 for "some other warmer climate of this new world", which turned out to be Maryland, though his family maintained agents to govern Avalon until 1637, when the entire island of Newfoundland was granted by charter to Sir David Kirke and The 3rd Marquess of Hamilton (who was later created The 1st Duke of Hamilton). Lord Baltimore's son, Cecilius Calvert, 2nd Baron Baltimore, fought against the new charter, and in 1660 gained official recognition of the old Charter of Avalon, but never attempted to retake the colony.

The site of the colony was designated a National Historic Site in 1953 It was also designated a Municipal Heritage District in 1998.

== See also ==
- List of communities in Newfoundland and Labrador
- Cuper's Cove
- Bristol's Hope
- British colonisation of the Americas
- William Vaughan (writer)
