= George Calvert, 1st Baron Baltimore =

English politician (1580–1632)

The Right Honourable The Lord Baltimore
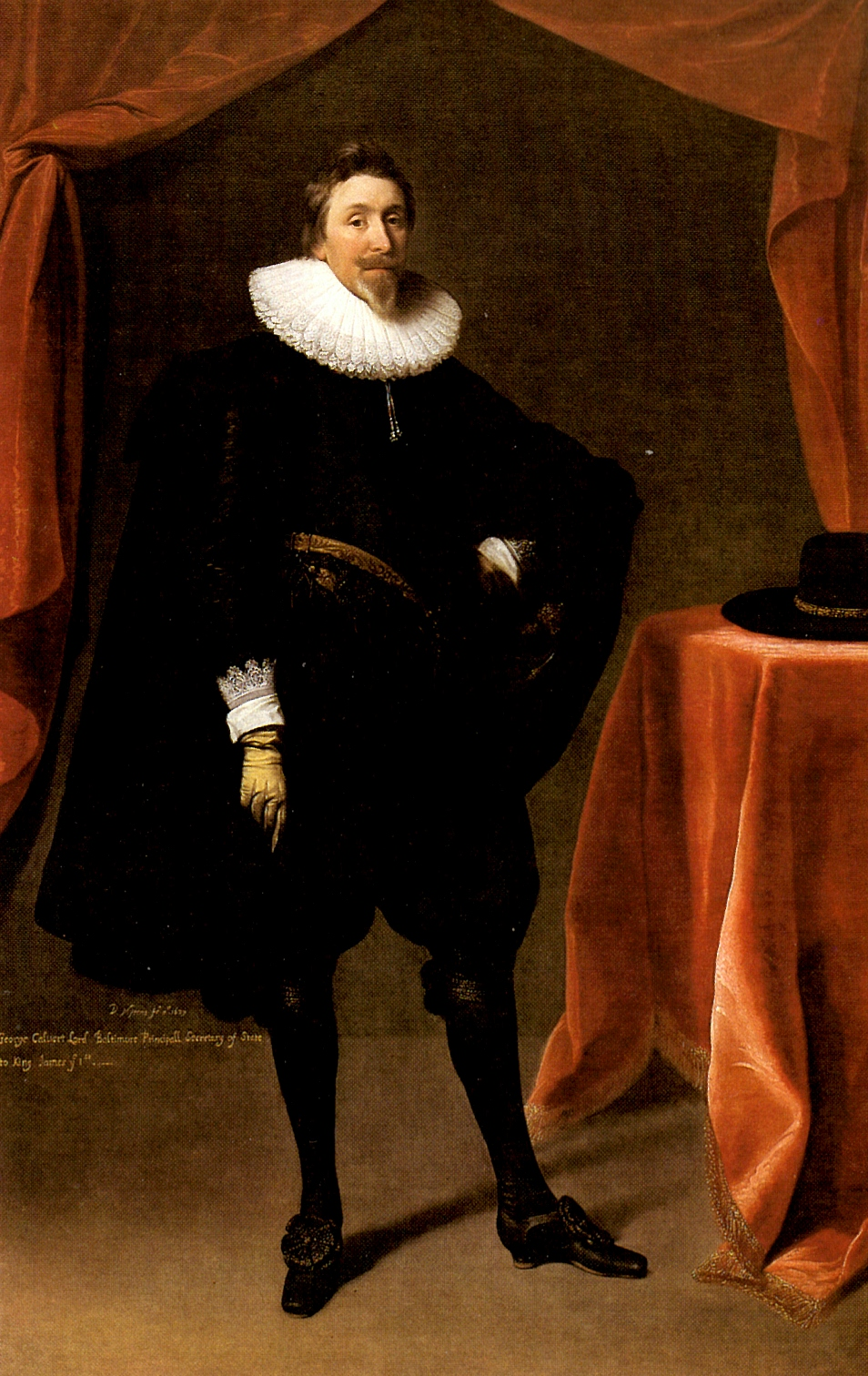

Secretary of State
- In office 1618–1625

Proprietor of the Avalon Colony (Newfoundland)
- In office 1620–1632

Personal details
- Born: 1580 Kiplin, North Yorkshire, England
- Died: 15 April 1632 (aged 52–53) Lincoln's Inn Fields, London, England
- Spouse(s): Anne Mynne (m. 1604) Joane
- Children: 12, including: Cecil Calvert, 2nd Baron Baltimore; Leonard Calvert; Philip Calvert

George Calvert, 1st Baron Baltimore (/ˈbɔːltɪmɔːr/; 1580 – 15 April 1632) was an English politician. He achieved domestic political success as a member of parliament and later Secretary of State under King James I. He lost much of his political power after his support for a failed marriage alliance between Prince Charles and the Spanish House of Habsburg royal family. Rather than continue in politics, he resigned all of his political offices in 1625 except for his position on the Privy Council and declared his Catholicism publicly. He was created Baron Baltimore in the Peerage of Ireland upon his resignation. Baltimore Manor was located in County Longford, Ireland.

Calvert took an interest in the British colonization of the Americas, first for commercial reasons and later to create a refuge for persecuted Irish and English Catholics. He became the proprietor of Avalon, the first sustained English settlement on the southeastern peninsula on the island of Newfoundland. Discouraged by its cold and sometimes inhospitable climate and the sufferings of the settlers, he looked for a more suitable spot further south and sought a new royal charter to settle the region, which would become the state of Maryland. Calvert died five weeks before the new Charter was sealed, leaving the settlement of the Maryland colony to his son Cecil. His second son Leonard Calvert was the first colonial governor of the Province of Maryland.

== Family and early life ==
Coat of Arms of George Calvert

Little is known of the ancestry of the Yorkshire branch of the Calverts. At George Calvert's knighting, it was claimed that his family originally came from Flanders. Calvert's father, Leonard of Yorkshire, was a country gentleman who had achieved some prominence as a tenant of Lord Wharton, and was wealthy enough to marry a "gentlewoman" of a noble line, Alicia or Alice Crossland (sometimes spelt "Crosland"). Leonard established his family on the estate of the later-built Kiplin Hall, near Catterick in Yorkshire. George Calvert was born at Kiplin in late 1579. His mother Alicia/Alice died on 28 November 1587, when he was eight years old. His father then married Grace Crossland (sometimes spelt: "Crosland"), Alicia's first cousin.

In 1569, Sir Thomas Gargrave described Richmond as a territory where all gentlemen were "evil in religion", by which he meant predominately Catholic; it appears Leonard Calvert was no exception. During the reign of Elizabeth I, continuing the changes wrought earlier in the century by her father Henry VIII which made the monarch the supreme authority of the Christian Church in England, continuing the Protestant Reformation from the continent of Europe, with the political, spiritual and temporal separation from the Catholic Church and the Pope/Papacy in Rome, the Royal Government exerted authority over the matters of religious faith, practices and the Church. Acts mandating compulsory religious uniformity were enacted by Parliament and enforced through penal laws. The Acts of Supremacy and the Uniformity Act of 1559 also included an oath of allegiance to the Queen and an implicit denial of the Pope's (then Pope Paul IV) authority over the English Church. This oath was required of any subject who wished to hold high office, attend university, or take advantage of opportunities controlled by the state (king/kingdom).

The Calvert household suffered the intrusion of the Elizabethan-era religious laws. From the year of George's birth onward, his father, Leonard Calvert, was subjected to repeated harassment by the Yorkshire authorities, who in 1580 extracted a promise of conformity from him, compelling his attendance at the Church of England services. In 1592, when George was twelve, the authorities denounced one of his tutors for teaching "from a popish primer" and instructed Leonard and Grace to send George and his brother Christopher to a Protestant tutor and, if necessary, to present the children before the commission "once a month to see how they perfect in learning". As a result, the boys were sent to a Protestant tutor called Fowberry at Bilton. The senior Calvert had to give a "bond of conformity"; he was banned from employing any Catholic servants and forced to purchase an English Bible, which was to "lie open in his house for everyone to read".

In 1593, records show that Grace Calvert was committed to the custody of a "pursuivant", an official responsible for identifying and persecuting Catholics, and in 1604 she was described as the "wife of Leonard Calvert of Kipling, non-communicant at Easter last".

George Calvert went up to Trinity College at Oxford University, matriculating in 1593/94, where he studied foreign languages and received a bachelor's degree in 1597. As the oath of allegiance was compulsory after the age of sixteen, he would almost certainly have pledged conformity while at Oxford. The same pattern of conformity, whether pretended or sincere, continued through Calvert's early life. After Oxford, he moved in 1598 to London, where he studied municipal law at Lincoln's Inn for three years.

== Marriage and family ==
In November 1604 he married Anne Mynne (or Mayne), daughter of George Mynne of Hertingfordbury and his wife Elizabeth Wroth, in a Protestant Church of England ceremony at St Peter's, Cornhill, Middlesex, where his address was registered as St Martin in the Fields. His children, including his eldest son and heir Cecil, who was born in the winter of 1605–06, were all baptised in the Church of England. When Anne died on 8 August 1622, she was buried at Calvert's local Protestant parish church, St Martin-in-the-Fields.

Calvert had a total of twelve children: Cecil, who succeeded his father as the 2nd Baron Baltimore, Leonard, Anne, Dorothy, Elizabeth, Grace, who married Sir Robert Talbot, 2nd Baronet of Carton, County Kildare, Francis, George, Helen, Henry, John (died young), and Philip.

== Political success ==
Calvert named his son "Cecilius" for Sir Robert Cecil, first Earl of Salisbury, spymaster to Queen Elizabeth, whom Calvert had met during an extended trip to the European mainland between 1601 and 1603, after which he became known as a specialist in foreign affairs. Calvert carried a packet for Cecilius from Paris, and so entered the service of the principal engineer of King James VI of Scotland's succession to the English throne in 1603 (when he also assumed the title of King James I of England).

King James rewarded Robert Cecil, whom he made a Privy Councillor and secretary of state, with the granting of the title of Earl of Salisbury in 1605 and Lord High Treasurer in 1608, making him the most powerful man at the royal court. As Cecil rose, Calvert rose with him. Calvert's foreign languages, legal training, and discretion made him an invaluable aide to Robert Cecil who, no lover of Catholics, seems to have accepted Calvert's conformity as beyond question. Working at the centre of court politics, Calvert exploited his influence by selling favours, an accepted practice for the times.

Calvert accumulated a number of small offices, honours, and sinecures. In August 1605, he attended the King at Oxford, and received an honorary master-of-arts degree in an elaborate ceremony at which the Duke of Lennox, the earls of Oxford and Northumberland, and Cecilius received degrees. Given the prestige of the other graduates, Calvert's was the last awarded, but his presence in such company signalled his growing stature.

In 1606 the king made Calvert "clerk of the Crown" and "Assizes in Connaught", County Clare, Ireland, his first royal appointment. In 1609, James appointed him a "clerk of the Signet office", a post which required the preparation of documents for the royal signature and brought Calvert into close contact with the king. Calvert also served in James's First Parliament as a member for the borough of Bossiney, in the county of Cornwall, installed there by Cecil to support his policies.

In 1610, Calvert was appointed a "clerk of the Privy Council". Each of these positions would have required an oath of allegiance.

With Robert Cecil's support, George Calvert came into his own as an adviser and supporter of King James. In 1610 and 1611, Calvert undertook missions to the continent on behalf of the King, visiting a number of embassies in Paris, Holland, and the Duchy of Cleves, and acting as an ambassador to the French Royal Court during the coronation of King Louis XIII in 1610. A correspondent from France reported that Calvert gave "everyone great contentment with his discreet conversation."

In 1615, James sent him to the continental Electorate of the Palatinate (German) in the Holy Roman Empire, whose impoverished elector, Frederick V, had married James's daughter Elizabeth in 1613. Calvert had to convey the King's disapproval that Elizabeth, for lack of money, had given away expensive jewels to a gentlewoman leaving her employ. Elector Frederick's decision in 1619 to accept the throne of Bohemia triggered a war with the powerful neighbouring Habsburg dynasty of Austria to the southwest in Vienna, which James attempted to end through a proposed alliance with the Kingdom of Spain.

In 1611, James employed Calvert to research and transcribe his tract against the Dutch Protestant theologian Conrad Vorstius. The following year, Cecil died, and Calvert acted as one of the four executors of his will. The king's favourite, Sir Robert Carr, first Earl of Somerset, Viscount Rochester, assumed the duties of secretary of state and recruited Calvert to assist with foreign policy, in particular the Latin and Spanish correspondence.

Carr, soon raised to the earldom of Somerset, was not a success in the job, and fell from favour partly as a result of the murder of Thomas Overbury, to which Carr's wife Frances, the former Countess of Essex and later Somerset, pleaded guilty in 1615. Carr's place as James's principal favourite was now taken by the handsome George Villiers, 1st Duke of Buckingham, with whom James was said to have been infatuated.

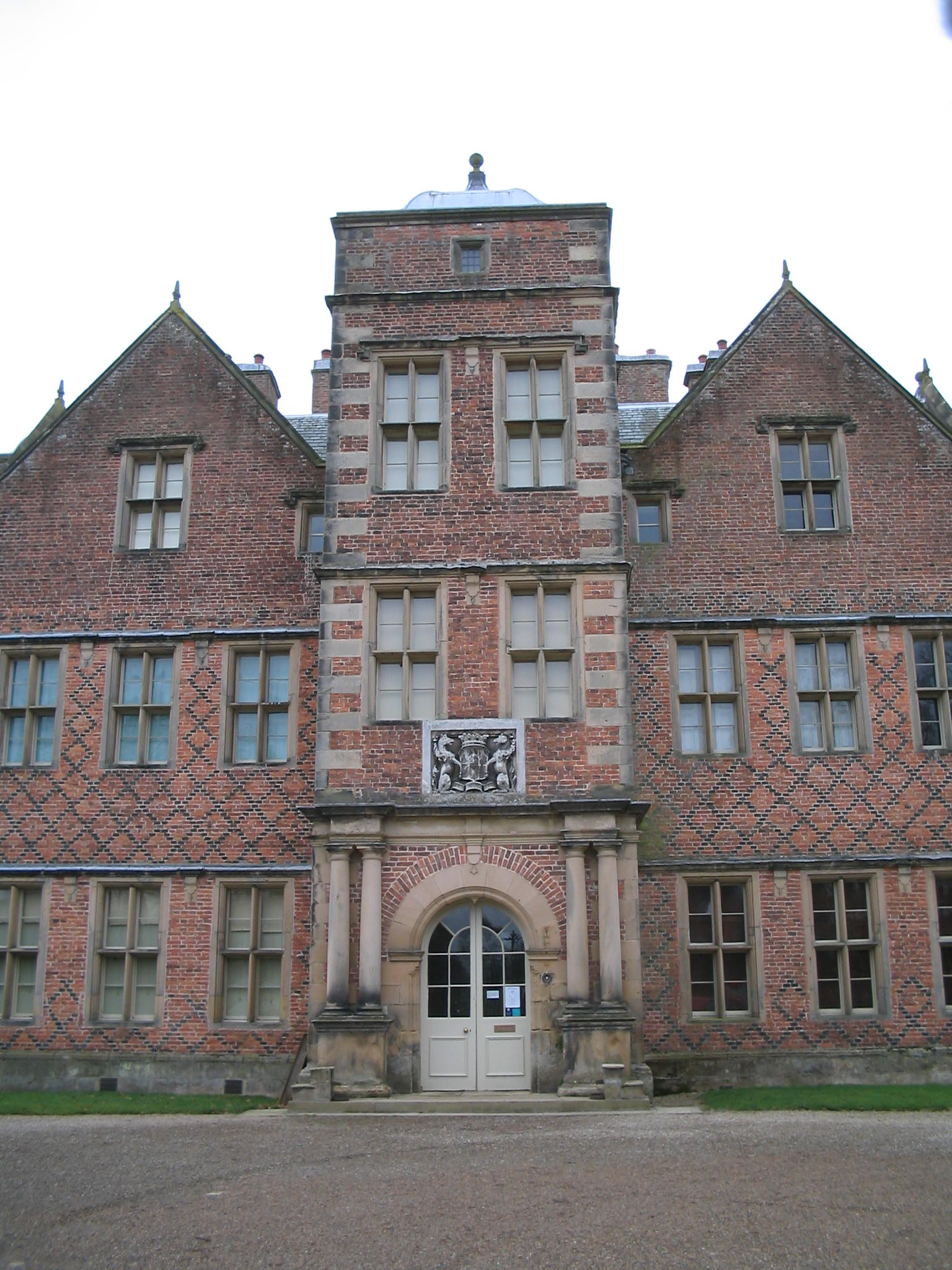
Kiplin Hall

In 1613 the King commissioned Calvert to investigate Catholic grievances in Ireland, along with Sir Humphrey Wynch, Sir Charles Cornwallis and Sir Roger Wilbraham. The commission spent almost four months in Ireland, and its final report, partly drafted by Calvert, concluded that religious conformity should be enforced more strictly in Ireland, Catholic schools be suppressed, and bad priests removed and punished. The King resolved not to reconvene the Parliament of Ireland until the Catholics "shall be better disciplined". In 1616 James endowed Calvert with the manor of Danby Wiske in Yorkshire, which brought him into contact with Sir Thomas Wentworth, 1st Earl of Strafford, who became his closest friend and political ally. Calvert was now wealthy enough to buy the Kiplin Hall estate in his home parish. (Today, the University of Maryland operates a research centre there, while the main building is a house museum owned by the Kiplin Hall Trust.) In 1617 his social status received a further boost when he was knighted, and then became Sir George Calvert.

In 1619, Calvert completed his rise to power when James appointed him as one of the two principal secretaries of state. This followed the dismissal of Sir Thomas Lake due to scandals, including his wife's indiscretions with state secrets. Not emerging as a candidate until the end of the selection process, Calvert's appointment surprised him and most observers. Assuming he owed his promotion to the king's increasingly powerful favourite George Villiers (later first Duke of Buckingham), he sent him a great jewel as a token of thanks. Villiers returned the jewel, saying he had had nothing to do with the matter. Calvert's personal fortune was secured when he was additionally appointed a "commissioner of the treasury" with a pension of £1,000 and a subsidy on imported raw silk, which would later be converted to another £1,000 pension.

== Secretary of State ==
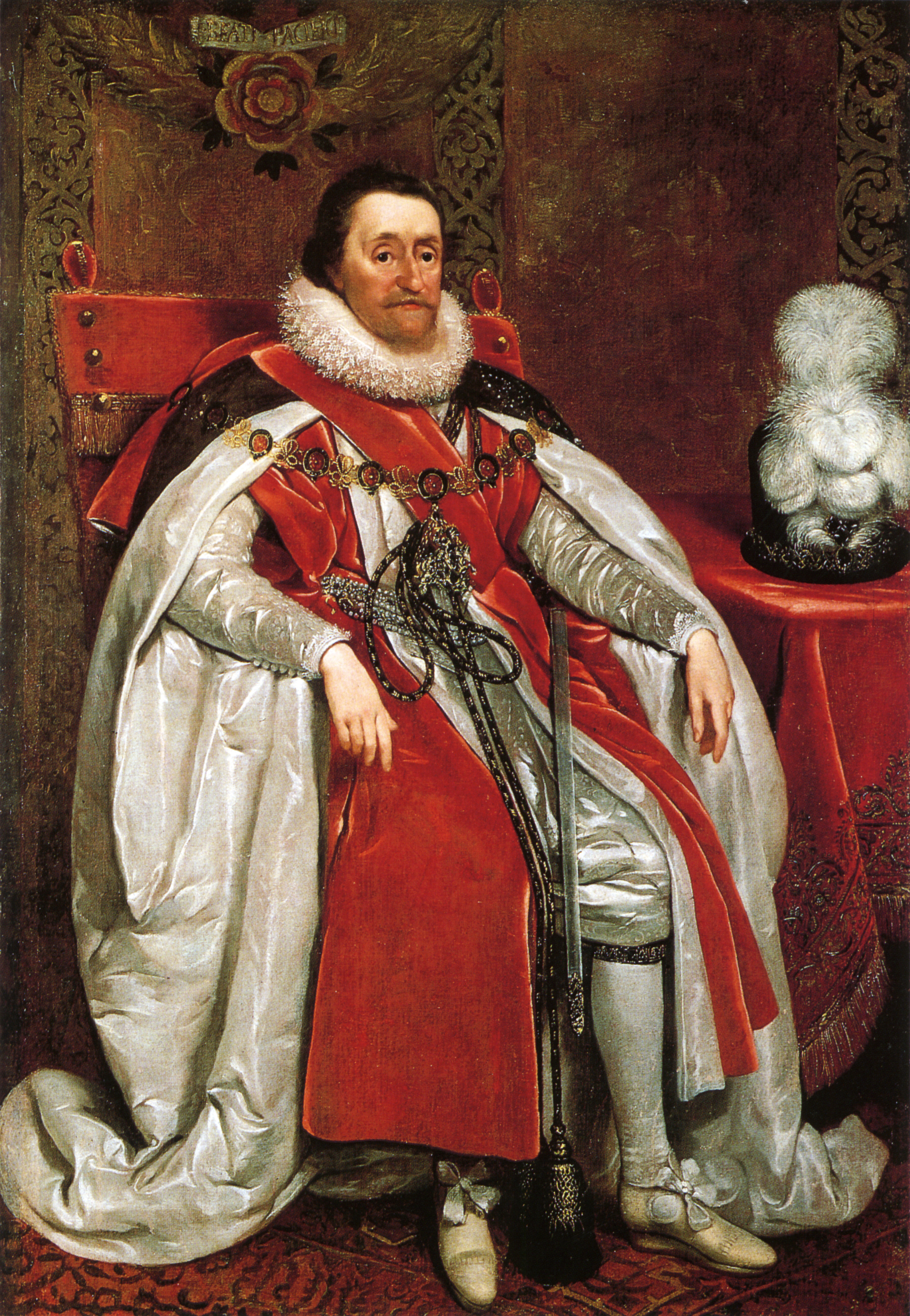
James I, painted by Daniël Mijtens in 1621. James made Calvert the first Baron Baltimore in 1625, in recognition of his services to the Crown.

In Parliament, a political crisis developed over the king's policy of seeking a Spanish wife for Charles, Prince of Wales, as part of a proposed alliance with the Habsburgs. In the parliament of 1621, it fell to Calvert to advocate the Spanish Match, as it came to be called, against the majority of Parliament, who feared an increase in Catholic influence on the state. As a result of his pro-Spanish stance and defence of relaxations in the penal laws against Catholics, Calvert became estranged from many in the Commons, who were suspicious of his close familiarity with the Spanish ambassador's court. Calvert also faced difficulties in his private life: his wife's death on 8 August 1622 left him the single father of ten children, the oldest of whom, Cecil, was sixteen years old.

King James rewarded Calvert in 1623 for his loyalty by granting him a 2,300-acre (930-hectare) estate in County Longford, in the Irish province of Leinster, where his seat was known as the "Manor of Baltimore". The name Baltimore is an anglicisation of the Irish Baile an Tí Mhóir meaning "town of the big house". Calvert was increasingly isolated from court circles as the Prince of Wales, (heir to the throne) and George Villiers wrested control of policy from the ageing James. Without consulting the diplomatically astute Calvert, the prince and the duke travelled to Spain to negotiate the Spanish marriage for themselves, with disastrous results. Instead of securing an alliance, the visit provoked hostility between the two courts which quickly led to war. In a reversal of policy, Buckingham dismissed the treaties with Spain, summoned a war council, and sought a French marriage for the Prince of Wales.

== Resignation and conversion to Catholicism ==
As the chief parliamentary spokesman for an abandoned policy, Calvert no longer served a useful purpose to the English Royal Court, and by February 1624 his duties had been restricted to placating the Spanish ambassador. The degree of his disfavour was shown when he was reprimanded for supposedly delaying diplomatic letters. Calvert bowed to the inevitable. On the pretext of ill health, he began negotiations for the sale of his position, finally resigning the secretariat in February 1625.

No disgrace was attached to Calvert's departure from office: the King, to whom he had always remained personally loyal, confirmed his place on the Privy Council and appointed him Baron Baltimore, of Baltimore, County Longford, one of his Irish manors. Immediately after Calvert resigned, he converted to Catholicism.

The connection between Calvert's resignation and his conversion to Catholicism was a complex one. George Cottington, a former employee of Calvert, suggested in 1628 that Calvert's conversion had been in progress a long time before it was made public. George Abbot, the reigning Archbishop of Canterbury (and ecclesiastical head of the independent Church of England), reported that political opposition to Calvert, combined with his loss of office, had "made him discontented and, as the saying is, "Desperatio facit monachum", so hee apparently did turne papist, which hee now professeth, this being the third time that he hath bene to blame that way [sic]". Godfrey Goodman, the Bishop of Gloucester, later claimed Calvert had been a secret Catholic all along, which explained his support for lenient policies towards Catholics and for the Spanish match.

No one had questioned Calvert's conformity at the time, and if he had been secretly Catholic, he had hidden it well. It seems more likely Calvert converted in late 1624. At the time, Simon Stock, a Discalced Carmelite priest reported to the Congregation Propaganda Fide in Rome on 15 November that he had converted two Privy Councillors to Catholicism, one of whom historians are certain was Calvert. Calvert, who had probably met Stock at the Spanish embassy in London, later worked with the priest on a plan for a Catholic mission in his new first Newfoundland Colony (off modern Canada).

When King James I died in March 1625, his successor Charles I maintained Calvert's barony but not his previous place on the Privy Council. Calvert then turned his attention to his Irish estates and his overseas investments. He was not entirely forgotten at court. After Buckingham's dabblings in wars against Spain and France had ended in failure, he recalled Baltimore to court, and for a while may have considered employing him in the peace negotiations with Spain. Though nothing came of Baltimore's recall, he renewed his rights over the silk-import duties, which had lapsed with the death of James I, and secured Charles' blessing for his venture in the "New Found Land".

== Colony of Avalon (Newfoundland) ==
Calvert had long maintained an interest in the exploration and settlement of the New World, beginning with his investment of twenty-five pounds in the second Virginia Company in 1609, and a few months later a more substantial sum in the East India Company, which he increased in 1614. In 1620, Calvert purchased a tract of land in Newfoundland from Sir William Vaughan, a Welsh writer and colonial investor, who had earlier failed to establish a colony on the large subarctic island off the eastern coast of North America. He named the area of the peninsula as Avalon, after the legendary spot where Christianity was supposedly introduced to Roman Britain in ancient times. The plantation lay on what is now called the Avalon Peninsula and included the fishing station at "Ferryland". Calvert almost certainly had a fishery project in mind at this stage.

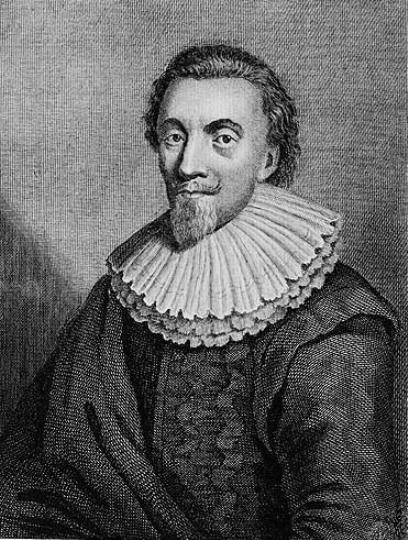
Sketch of Sir George Calvert, c. 1620

Calvert dispatched Captain Edward Wynne and a group of Welsh colonists to Ferryland, where they landed in August 1621, and set about constructing a settlement. Wynne sent positive reports concerning the potential for local fisheries and for the production of salt, hemp, flax, tar, iron, timber and hops. Wynne also praised the climate, declaring, "It is better and not so cold as England," and predicted that the colony would become self-sufficient after one year. Others corroborated Wynne's reports: for example, Captain Daniel Powell, who delivered a further party of settlers to Ferryland, wrote: "The land on which our Governor [Calvert and/or Wynne] planted is so good and commodious, that for the quantity, I think there is no better in many parts of England"; but he added ominously that Ferryland was "the coldest harbour in the land". Wynne and his men began work on various building projects, including a substantial house and the shoring up of the harbour. To protect them against marauding French warships, a recent hazard in the area, since the recent founding of New France in the interior (modern Lower Canada of the 18th and 19th centuries, Province of Quebec and Dominion of Canada) along the St. Lawrence River, Calvert employed the pirate John Nutt.

The settlement appeared to be progressing so well that in January 1623, Calvert obtained a concession from King James for the whole of Newfoundland, though the grant was soon reduced to cover only the southeastern Avalon peninsula, owing to competing claims from other English colonists. The final Charter constituted the province as a "county palatinate", officially titled the "Province of Avalon", under Calvert's personal rule.

After resigning the Royal secretariat of state in 1625, the new Baron Baltimore made clear his intention to visit the colony: "I intend shortly," he wrote in March, "God willing, a journey for Newfoundland to visit a plantation which I began there some few years since." His plans were disrupted by the death of King James I, and by the crackdown on Catholics with which King Charles I began his reign to appease his opponents. The new King required all privy councillors to take the oaths of supremacy and allegiance; and since Baltimore, as a Catholic, had to refuse, he was obliged to step down from that cherished office. Given the new religious and political climate, and perhaps also to escape a serious outbreak of plague in England, Baltimore moved to his estates in Ireland. His expedition to Newfoundland had set sail without him in late May 1625 under Sir Arthur Aston, who became the new provincial Governor of Avalon.

A reference by David Rothe, bishop of Ossory in Ireland, to a "Joane [also recorded as Jane] Baltimore now wife" of Calvert, reveals that Baltimore had recently remarried.

From the time of his conversion in 1625 onwards, Baltimore took care to cater for the religious needs of his colonists, both Catholic and Protestant. He had asked Simon Stock to provide priests for the 1625 expedition, but Stock's recruits arrived in England after Aston had sailed. Stock's own ambitions for the colony appear to have exceeded Baltimore's: in letters to De Propaganda Fide in Rome, Stock claimed the Newfoundland settlement could act as a springboard for the conversion of natives not only in the New World but also in China, the latter via a passage he believed existed from the east coast to the Pacific Ocean.

== Baltimore in Avalon ==
Baltimore was determined to visit his colony in person. In May 1626, he wrote to Wentworth:

Newfoundland ... imports me more than in Curiosity only to see; for I must either go and settle it in a better Order than it is, or else give it over, and lose all the Charges I have been at hitherto for other Men to build their Fortunes upon. And I had rather be esteemed a Fool for some by the Hazard of one Month's journey, than to prove myself one certainly for six Years by past, if the Business be now lost for some want of a little Pains and Care.

Aston's return to England in late 1626, along with all the Catholic settlers, failed to deter Baltimore, who finally sailed for Newfoundland in 1627, arriving on 23 July and staying only two months before returning to England. He had taken both Protestant and Catholic settlers with him, as well as two secular priests, Thomas Longville and Anthony Pole (also known as Smith), the latter remaining behind in the colony when Baltimore departed for England. The land Baltimore had seen was by no means the paradise described by some early settlers, being only marginally productive; as the summer climate was deceptively mild, his brief visit gave Baltimore no reason to alter his plans for the colony.

In 1628 he sailed again for Newfoundland, this time with his second wife Jane, and most of his children, and 40 more settlers, to officially take over as Proprietary Governor of Avalon. He and his family moved into the house at Ferryland built by Wynne, a sizeable structure for the time, by colonial standards, and the only one in the settlement large enough to accommodate religious services for the community.

Matters connected to religion were to bedevil Baltimore's stay in "this remote part of the worlde where I have planted my selfe [sic]". He sailed at a time when English military preparations were underway to relieve the Huguenots at La Rochelle. He was dismayed to find that the war with France had spread to Newfoundland, and that he had to spend most of his time fighting off French attacks on English fishing fleets with his own ships the Dove and the Ark. As he wrote to Buckingham, "I came to builde, and sett, and sowe, but I am falne to fighting with Frenchmen [sic]". His settlers were so successful against the French that they captured several ships, which they escorted back to England to help with the war effort. Baltimore was granted the loan of one of the ships to aid in his defence of the colony, as well as a share of the prize money.

Adopting a policy of free religious worship in the colony, Baltimore allowed the Catholics to worship in one part of his house and the Protestants in another. This novel arrangement proved too much for the resident Anglican priest, Erasmus Stourton—"that knave Stourton", as Baltimore referred to him—who, after altercations with Baltimore, was placed on a ship for England, where he lost no time in reporting Baltimore's practices to the authorities, complaining that the Catholic priests Smith and Hackett said mass every Sunday and "doe use all other ceremonies of the church of Rome in as ample a manner as tis used in Spayne [sic]". and that Baltimore had the son of a Protestant forcibly baptised as a Catholic. Although Stourton's complaints were investigated by the Privy Council, due to Baltimore's support in high places the case was dismissed.

Baltimore had become disenchanted with conditions in "this wofull country", and he wrote to his old acquaintances in England lamenting his troubles. The final blow to his hopes was dealt by the Newfoundland winter of 1628–9, which did not release its grip until May. Like others before them, the residents of Avalon suffered terribly from the cold and from malnutrition. Nine or ten of Baltimore's company died that winter, and with half the settlers ill at one time, his house had to be turned into a hospital. The sea froze over, and nothing would grow before May. "Tis not terra Christianorum", Baltimore wrote to Wentworth. He confessed to the king: "I have found...by too deare bought experience [that which other men] always concealed from me...that there is a sad face of wynter upon all this land".

Baltimore solicited a new charter from the king. To found an alternative colony in a less hostile climate further south, he requested "a precinct" in Virginia, where he could grow tobacco. He wrote to his friends Francis Cottington and Thomas Wentworth enlisting their support for this new proposal, admitting the impression his abandonment of Avalon might make in England: "I shall rayse a great deal of talke and discourse and be censured by most men of giddiness and levity [sic]". The king, perhaps guided by Baltimore's friends at court, replied expressing concern for Baltimore's health and gently advising him to forget colonial schemes and return to England, where he would be treated with every respect: "Men of your condition and breeding are fitter for other imployments than the framing of new plantations, which commonly have rugged & laborious beginnings, and require much greater meanes, in managing them, than usually the power of one private subject can reach unto".

Baltimore sent his children home to England in August. By the time the king's letter reached Avalon, he had departed with his wife and servants for Virginia.

== Attempt to found a Southern colony ==
In late September or October 1629, Baltimore arrived in Jamestown, where the Virginians, who suspected him of designs on some of their territory and vehemently opposed Catholicism, gave him a cool welcome. They gave him the oaths of supremacy and allegiance, which he refused to take, so they ordered him to leave. After no more than a few weeks in the colony, Baltimore left for England to pursue the new charter, leaving his wife and servants behind. In early 1630 he procured a ship to fetch them, but it foundered off the Irish coast, and his wife drowned. Baltimore described himself the following year as "a long time myself a Man of Sorrows".

Baltimore spent the last two years of his life constantly lobbying for his new charter, though the obstacles proved difficult. The Virginians, led by William Claiborne, who sailed to England to make the case, campaigned aggressively against the separate colonising of the Chesapeake, claiming they possessed the rights to that area. Baltimore was short of capital, having exhausted his fortune, and was sometimes forced to depend on the assistance of his friends. To make matters worse, in the summer of 1630 his household was infected by the bubonic plague, which he survived. He wrote to Wentworth: "Blessed be God for it who hath preserved me now from shipwreck, hunger, scurvy and pestilence..."

His health declining, Baltimore's persistence over the charter finally paid off in 1632. The king first granted him a location south of Jamestown, but Baltimore asked the king to reconsider in response to opposition from other investors interested in settling the new land of Carolina into a sugar plantation. Baltimore eventually compromised by accepting redrawn boundaries to the north of the Potomac River, on either side of the Chesapeake Bay. The charter was about to pass when the fifty-two-year-old Baltimore died in his lodgings at Lincoln's Inn Fields, on 15 April 1632. Five weeks later, on 20 June 1632, the charter for Maryland passed the seals.

== Legacy ==
The state flag of Maryland is the banner of Baltimore's coat-of-arms (Calvert, his father's family, in the first and fourth quarters, and Crossland, his mother's family, in the second and third quarters).

In his will, written the day before he died, Baltimore beseeched his friends Wentworth and Cottington to act as guardians and supervisors to his first son Cecil, who inherited the title of Lord Baltimore and the imminent grant of Maryland. Baltimore's two colonies in the New World continued under the proprietorship of his family. Avalon, which remained a prime spot for the salting and export of fish, was expropriated by Sir David Kirke, with a new royal charter which Cecil Calvert vigorously challenged, and it was finally absorbed into Newfoundland in 1754. Although Baltimore's failed Avalon venture marked the end of an early era of attempts at proprietary colonisation, it laid the foundation upon which permanent settlements developed in that region of Newfoundland.

Maryland became a prime tobacco exporting colony in the mid-Atlantic and, for a time, a refuge for Catholic settlers, as George Calvert had hoped. Under the rule of the Lords Baltimore, thousands of British Catholics emigrated to Maryland, establishing some of the oldest Catholic communities in what later became the United States. Catholic rule in Maryland was eventually nullified by the re-assertion of royal control over the colony.

One hundred and forty years after its first settlement, Maryland joined twelve other British colonies along the Atlantic coast in declaring their independence from British rule and the right to freedom of religion for all citizens in the new United States.

The World War II ship SS George Calvert was named in his honour.

== Notes ==
Parliament of England
Preceded by Sir Jerome Horsey; George Upton	Member of Parliament for Bossiney; 1609–1611; With: Sir Jerome Horsey	Succeeded by Sir Jerome Horsey; John Wood
Preceded by Sir John Savile; Sir Thomas Wentworth	Member of Parliament for Yorkshire; 1621–1622; With: Sir Thomas Wentworth	Succeeded by Sir Thomas Savile; Sir John Savile
Preceded by Sir John Bennet; Sir Clement Edmondes	Member of Parliament for Oxford University; 1624; With: Sir Isaac Wake	Succeeded by Sir Thomas Edmonds; Sir John Danvers
Government offices
Preceded by Sir Thomas Lake; Sir Robert Naunton	Secretary of State; 1619–1625; With: Sir Robert Naunton 1619–1623; Sir Edward Conway 1623–1625	Succeeded by Sir Edward Conway; Sir Albertus Morton
Preceded by Sir Arthur Aston	Proprietary Governor of Newfoundland; 1627–1629	Succeeded by Cecil Calvert
Peerage of Ireland
New creation	Baron Baltimore; 1625–1632	Succeeded by Cecil Calvert
