= London and Bristol Company =

English joint-stock company (1610-?)

London and Bristol Company the Tresurer and the Companye of Adventurers and planter of the Cittye of london and Bristoll for the Collonye or plantacon in Newfoundland
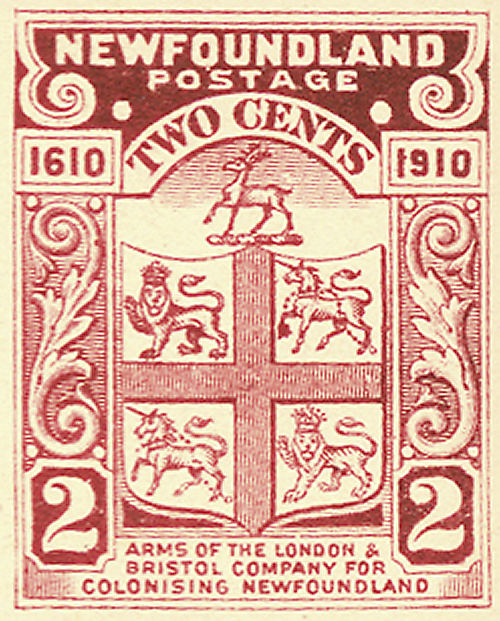
- Newfoundland postage stamp featuring the arms of the London and Bristol Company
- Type: Public
- Industry: International trade
- Founded: 2 May 1610
- Founders: John Guy
- Fate: Dissolved
- Headquarters: London, England
- Area served: Newfoundland
- Key people: Henry Cary, 1st Viscount Falkland

The London and Bristol Company came about in the early 17th century when English merchants had begun to express an interest in the Newfoundland fishery. Financed by a syndicate of investors John Guy, himself a Bristol merchant, visited Newfoundland in 1608 to locate a favourable site for a colony. Upon his return to England 40 people applied for incorporation as the Tresurer and the Companye of Adventurers and planter of the Cittye of london and Bristoll for the Collonye or plantacon in Newfoundland. The company was known as the London and Bristol Company or simply the Newfoundland Company.

The company was granted a charter by James I on May 2, 1610, giving it a monopoly in agriculture, mining, fishing and hunting on the Avalon Peninsula. They retained exclusive rights until 1616 when the Crown began to grant lands to others. The new grants were then initiated by the Bristol Society of Merchant Ventures. The Merchant Ventures were made up of many who had been members of the London and Bristol Company.

Among some of the other prominent members of the London and Bristol Company, Henry Cary, 1st Viscount Falkland became a supporter of the venture. Cary had influence in the company through his wife, daughter of Sir Laurence Tanfield, one of the leaders of the company.

== See also ==
- British colonization of the Americas
- List of communities in Newfoundland and Labrador
- Bristol's Hope
- Renews, Newfoundland and Labrador
- South Falkland
- New Cambriol
