= Avalon Peninsula =

Peninsula on the island of Newfoundland

Coordinates: 47.29°N 53.35°W

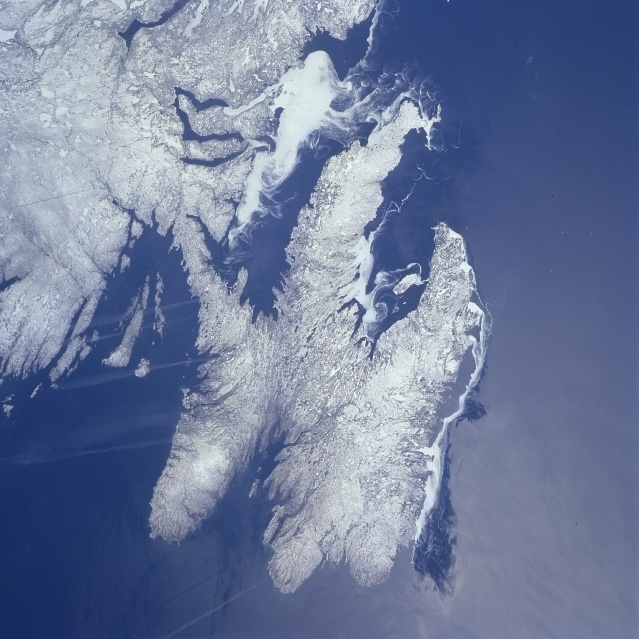
- Satellite view of the Avalon Peninsula in the winter

- Avalon Peninsula (Newfoundland) Location of the Avalon Peninsula in Newfoundland

Geography
- Location: North America
- Adjacent to: Atlantic Ocean
- Area: 9,220.61 km^{2} (3,560.10 sq mi)

Administration
- Canada

Demographics
- Population: 270,348 (2016)

The Avalon Peninsula (French: Péninsule d'Avalon) is a large peninsula that makes up the southeast portion of the island of Newfoundland in Canada. It is 9,220.61 square kilometres (3,560.10 sq mi) in size.

The peninsula is home to 270,348 people, about 52% of the province's population, according to the 2016 Canadian census. The peninsula is the location of St. John's, the provincial capital and largest city. It is connected to the main section of the island by the 5 km (3 mi) wide Isthmus of Avalon. The peninsula protrudes into the rich fishing zones near the Grand Banks. Its four major bays (Trinity Bay, Conception Bay, St. Mary's Bay and Placentia Bay) have long been the centre of Newfoundland's fishing industry.

== Geography and geology ==
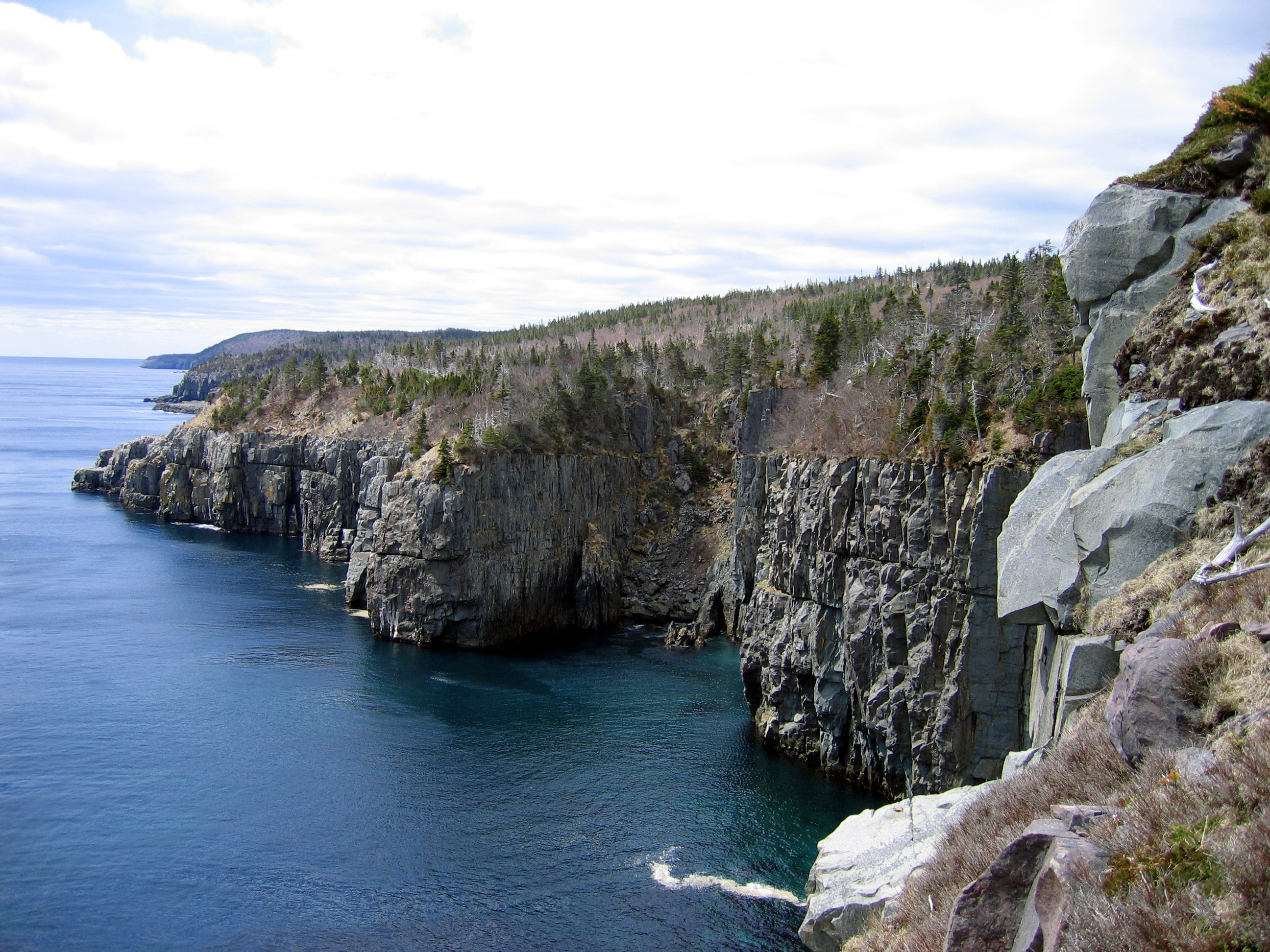
The coast of the Avalon Peninsula, in the province of Newfoundland and Labrador

The Avalon Peninsula is pinched into smaller peninsulas formed by St. Mary's Bay and Conception Bay. St. John's is located in the northeast of the peninsula.

The Avalon Peninsula is a noted region for Precambrian fossils, and many Lagerstätten of the diverse Ediacaran biota are found on the peninsula. Mistaken Point is the original location of the first documented Ediacaran, Aspidella terranovica (which gets its specific name from Newfoundland). The peninsula gives its name to the ancient micro-continent Avalonia of which it was part.

== History ==
In 1497, explorer John Cabot led an expedition from England in an attempt to reach the Spice Islands in the East Indies. He is said to have reached what is now known as Bonavista. The English established their first permanent settlement at Cuper's Cove in 1610.

Sir George Calvert was later given a large land holding on the peninsula in 1619 from William Vaughan, whose previous colony of Cambriol failed. The initial colony of Ferryland grew to a population of 100, becoming the first successful permanent settlement on Newfoundland island. In 1623 Calvert was given a royal charter extending the royal lands and granting them the name Province of Avalon "in imitation of Old Avalon in Somersetshire wherein Glassenbury stands, the first fruits of Christianity in Britain as the other was in that party of America". Calvert wished to make the colony a refuge for Roman Catholics facing persecution in England. In 1625, Calvert was elevated to the Peerage of Ireland as the 1st Baron Baltimore.

A series of crises and calamities led Lord Baltimore to quit the colony in 1629 for "some other warmer climate of this new world", which turned out to be Maryland, in the Chesapeake Bay Colony. His family maintained agents to govern Avalon until 1637, when the entire island of Newfoundland was granted by charter to Sir David Kirke and the 3rd Marquess of Hamilton.

In 1696, during King William's War, the French destroyed many English villages in the Avalon Peninsula Campaign. They had settled along the St. Lawrence River and from the Atlantic coast to Quebec and Montreal.

During Queen Anne's War, Commodore John Leake of the Royal Navy led an expedition aimed at capturing French ships around the peninsula and burning French settlements. The expedition was largely successful. During this same conflict, the French attempted to besiege the fortified English port of St. John's, but were unsuccessful. They later returned and captured the town, burning it to the ground.

In the late eighteenth century, the longstanding rivalry between Great Britain and France erupted again in the Seven Years' War. The Battle of Signal Hill was fought on the peninsula in 1762. In this engagement, British soldiers and artillery under the command of William Amherst drove the French occupants of St. John's from Signal Hill and into the town's fort, where they soon surrendered.

== See also ==
- Avalon explosion
- British colonization of the Americas
- Dominion of Newfoundland
- Exploration of North America
- Heritage Foundation of Newfoundland and Labrador
- New Cambriol
