= Madras Time =

Former time zone in British India

Madras Time was a time zone established in 1802 by John Goldingham, the first official astronomer of the British East India Company in British India when he determined the longitude of Madras as 5 hours, 21 minutes and 14 seconds ahead of Greenwich Mean Time. It has been described as 8 minutes and 46 seconds from UTC+05:30 and 32 minutes and 6 seconds behind Calcutta Time which puts it at (UTC+05:21:14). Before India's independence, it was the closest precursor to Indian Standard Time which is derived from the location of the observatory at 82.5°E longitude in Shankargarh Allahabad in Uttar Pradesh.

After Bombay Time and Calcutta Time were set up as the two official time zones during the British Raj in 1884, railway companies in India began to use Madras time as an intermediate time zone between the two zones. This led to Madras time also being known as "Railway time of India". It was phased out on 1 January 1906 when the Indian Standard Time was adopted.

== See also ==
- Bombay Time
- Calcutta Time
- Indian Standard Time
- Port Blair mean time
- Railway time in India
- Time in India
- UTC+05:30
