= Time in India =

- Time zone

UTC offset
- IST: UTC+05:30

Current time
- :: IST [refresh]

Observance of DST
- DST is not observed in this time zone.

India uses one time zone, the Indian Standard Time (IST), which equates to UTC+05:30, i.e. five and a half hours ahead of the Coordinated Universal Time (UTC). Though India geographically spans across two time zones, it uses a single time zone across its territories. India currently does not observe daylight saving time.

The official time signal is given by the Time and Frequency Standards Laboratory in New Delhi. The IANA time zone database mentions the zone pertaining to IST as Asia/Kolkata, based on Kolkata, because it was the most populous city in the zone at the time the zone was set up. Various time notations are used depending on the usage.

== Background ==
=== History ===
==== Ancient India ====
The 4th century CE astronomical treatise Surya Siddhanta postulated a spherical Earth. The book described a custom of the prime meridian or zero longitude, as passing through Avanti, the ancient name for the historic city of Ujjain, and Rohitaka, the ancient name for Rohtak (28°54′N 76°38′E), a city near the Kurukshetra.

The day used by ancient Indian astronomers began at sunrise at the prime meridian of Ujjain, and was divided into smaller time units in the following manner:

Time that is measurable is that which is in common use, beginning with the prāṇa (or the time span of one breath). The pala contains six prāṇas. The ghalikā is 60 palas, and the nakṣatra ahórātra, or astronomical day, contains 60 ghalikās. A nakṣatra māsa, or astronomical month, consists of 30 days.

Taking a day to be 24 hours, the smallest time unit, prāṇa, or one respiratory cycle, equals 4 seconds, a value consistent with the normal breathing frequency of 15 breaths/min used in modern medical research. The Surya Siddhanta also described a method of converting local time to the standard time of Ujjain. Despite these early advances, standard time was not widely used outside astronomy. For most of India's history, ruling kingdoms kept their own local time, typically using the Hindu calendar in both lunar and solar units. For example, the Jantar Mantar observatory built by Maharaja Sawai Jai Singh in Jaipur in 1733 contains large sundials, up to 27 m (90 ft) high, which were used to accurately determine the local time.

==== During British colonial rule ====
In 1802 Madras Time was set up by John Goldingham and this was later used widely by the railways in India. Local time zones were also set up in the important cities of Bombay and Calcutta and as Madras time was intermediate to these, it was one of the early contenders for an Indian standard time zone. Though British India did not officially adopt the standard time zones until 1905, when the meridian passing east of Allahabad at 82.5° E longitude was picked as the central meridian for India, corresponding to a single time zone for the country (UTC+05:30). Indian Standard Time came into force on 1 January 1906, and also applied to Sri Lanka (then Ceylon). However, Calcutta Time was officially maintained as a separate time zone until 1948 and Bombay Time until 1955.

In 1925, time synchronisation began to be relayed through omnibus telephone systems and control circuits to organisations that needed to know the precise time. This continued until the 1940s, when time signals began to be broadcast using the radio by the government. Briefly during World War II, clocks under Indian Standard Time were advanced by one hour, referred to as War Time. This provision lasted from 1 September 1942, to 15 October 1945.

==== After independence ====
After independence in 1947, the Indian government established IST as the official time for the whole country, although Mumbai and Kolkata retained their own local time for a few more years. In 2014 Assamese politicians proposed following a daylight-saving schedule that would be ahead of IST by an hour, but as of May 2, 2026 it has not been approved by the central government.

Plantations Labour Act of 1951 allows the union and state governments to define and set the local time for particular industrial areas. Due to this, in regions of Assam, tea gardens follow a separate time zone, known as the Chaibagan or Bagan time ('Tea Garden Time'), which is one hour ahead of IST. However, IST remains the only officially used time.

=== Former practices ===
==== Former time zones ====
Earlier time zones, no longer in use after the adoption of a standardized time zone across India, were:

Official
Time Zone	UTC	Period	Notes
Bombay Time	UTC+04:51	1884–1955	Official until 1906, later continued in Bombay
Calcutta Time	UTC+05:53:20	1884–1948	Official until 1906, later continued in Calcutta
Madras Time	UTC+05:21:14	1802–1906	Indian Railways
Time Zone	UTC	Period	Notes
Port Blair mean time	UTC+06:10:37	19th century–1906	
Rangoon Mean Time	UTC+06:24:40	1880–1927	

==== Former daylight saving ====
India and the Indian subcontinent observed "daylight saving (DST)" during the Second World War, from 1942 to 1945. During the Sino-Indian War of 1962 and the Indo–Pakistani Wars of 1965 and 1971, daylight saving was briefly used to reduce civilian energy consumption.

== Present time zone ==
India uses UTC+5:30, referred to as Asia/Kolkata in the IANA time zone database.

== See also ==
- Date and time notation in India
- Hindu units of time
- History of measurement systems in India
- Daylight saving time
- Daylight saving time by country
