= Pelwadiya =

Pelwadiya පැල්වාඩිය
- Village
- Location within Sri Lanka
- Coordinates: 6°40′N 80°24′E
- Country: Sri Lanka
- Province: Sabaragamuwa Province
- District: Ratnapura District
- Elevation: 130 m (430 ft)
- Time zone: UTC+05:30 (SLT)

Pelwadiya (පැල්වාඩිය) is a village situated in the Sabaragamuwa Province of southwestern Sri Lanka. It is located 5 km (3.1 mi) to the east of the province's capital, Ratnapura.

== Places of worship ==
- Pelwadiya Bodhigiri Viharaya
