= St Stephen's Church, Bristol =

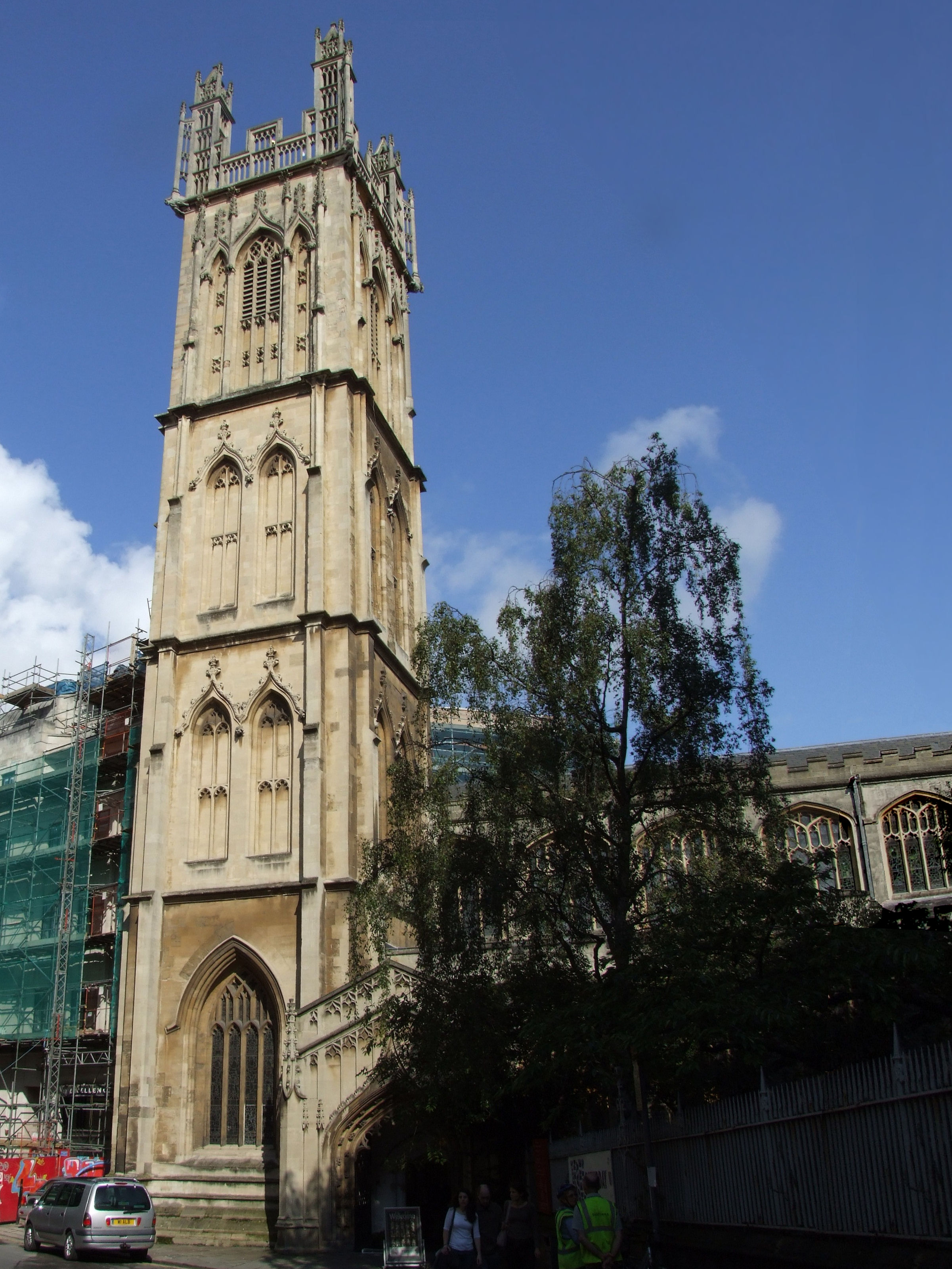
- St Stephen's Church

- shown within Bristol
- 51°27′15″N 2°35′46″W
- Location: Bristol
- Country: England
- Denomination: Church of England

Architecture
- Heritage designation: Grade I listed building
- Designated: 8 January 1959
- Completed: 14th century

St Stephen's Church in St Stephen's Avenue, is the parish church for the city of Bristol, England.

It has been designated by Historic England as a grade I listed building.

== History ==
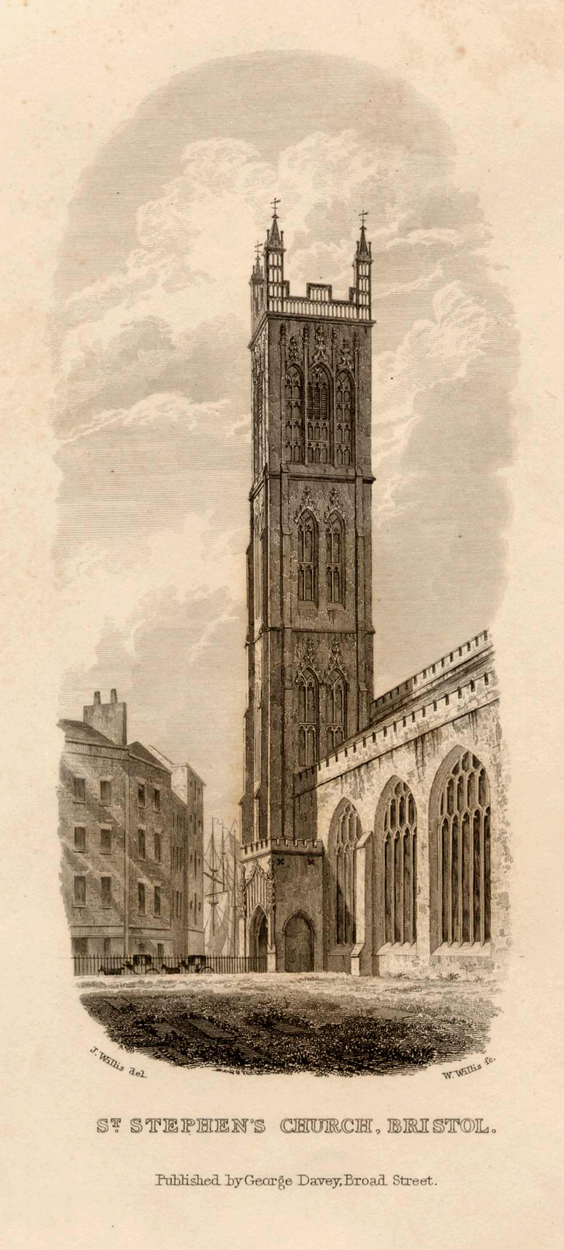
Black and white engraving of St Stephen's Church, Bristol, UK, published c.1838. The view is from the south east of the church, showing the body of the church on the right of the image and the distinctive tall, thin tower in the centre. In front of the church can be seen two horses and carts. From 1240 to 1892 the Bristol Harbour was on the opposite side of the church when it was filled in.

It was built, on the site of an 11th-century church, in the 14th century and rebuilt around 1470. The tower and east window were paid for by John Shipward, four times Mayor of Bristol, who died in 1473, the tower being built by the mason Benedict (or Benet) Crosse. The site was on the banks of the River Frome, which was diverted in the 1240s to create Bristol Harbour. The clerestory was repaired after a storm in 1703. The aisle and east windows were restored in 1873.

The tower measures approximately 18 ft by 20 ft at its base, and rises to a total height of 152 ft. It originally contained six bells but these have been replaced over the years and the number increased to twelve. The tower is typical of Somerset churches, but with the addition of a "Gloucestershire crown" of arcaded battlements, pinnacles and open-work arcading.

The 15th-century brass eagle lectern and the iron sword rest by William Edney of about 1710 were moved to St Stephen's from St Nicholas church, which was damaged in the Bristol Blitz.

In 1885, Ramsay MacDonald took up a position as an assistant to Mordaunt Crofton, a Bristol clergyman who was attempting to establish a Boys' and Young Men's Guild at St Stephen's Church. It was in Bristol that Ramsay MacDonald joined his first Radical organisation before moving to London in early 1886. Later, MacDonald became the first Labour Party Prime Minister of the United Kingdom.

The St Stephen's Ringers have been a continuously active group of bellringers since 1574, and have met annually at The Red Lodge since 1920 for their ceremonial dinner.

== Tombs, burials and monuments ==
Edmund Blanket, a 14th-century clothier and wool merchant, has a tomb on the north side of the church.

Arnaq and Kalicho, who were amongst the first North Americans to visit Britain (having been seized by Martin Frobisher), were buried at this church as "heathens" in 1577, within months of arriving in England.

A significant tomb is that of Martin Pring, who died at the age of 46 in 1627. He was a navigator, explorer and merchant and discovered what is now called Cape Cod Bay. The monument is draped with painted mermaids and mermen and verses to his exploits. Sir Walter Tyddesley, who died in 1385, and Sir George Snigge also have ornate tombs in the church. Also commemorated, but this time in a wall-mounted plaque, is Robert Kitchin, who died in 1594, a donor of one of the famous bronze "nails" (merchants' counting tables) found outside The Exchange in Bristol.

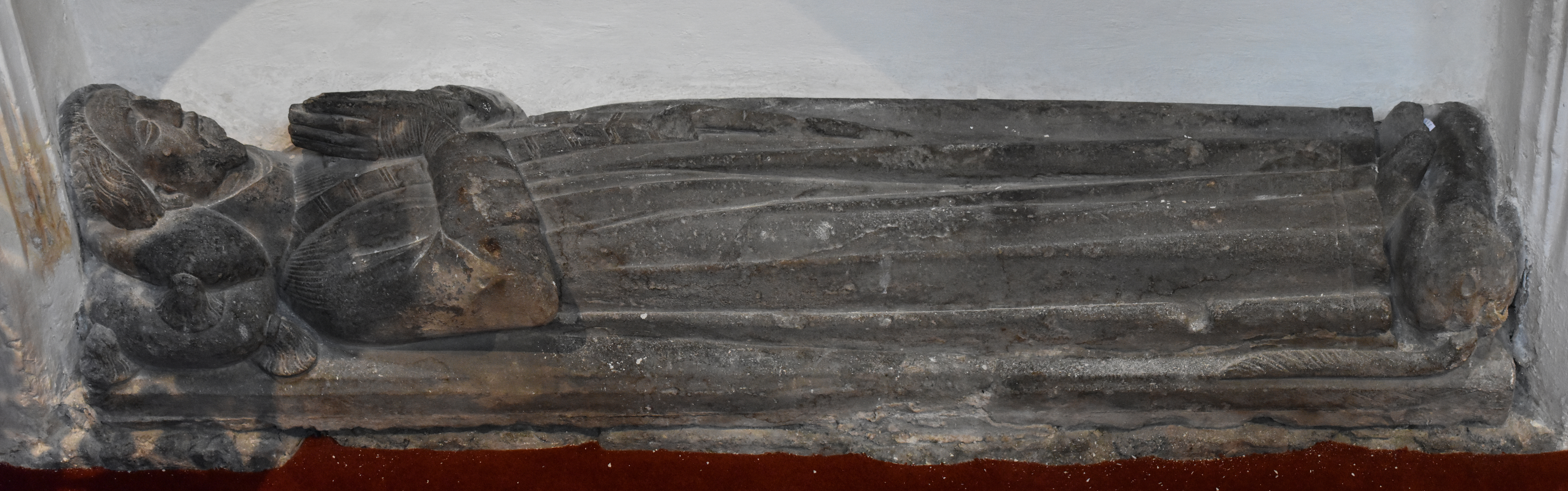
Monument to Walter Tyddesley, 1385

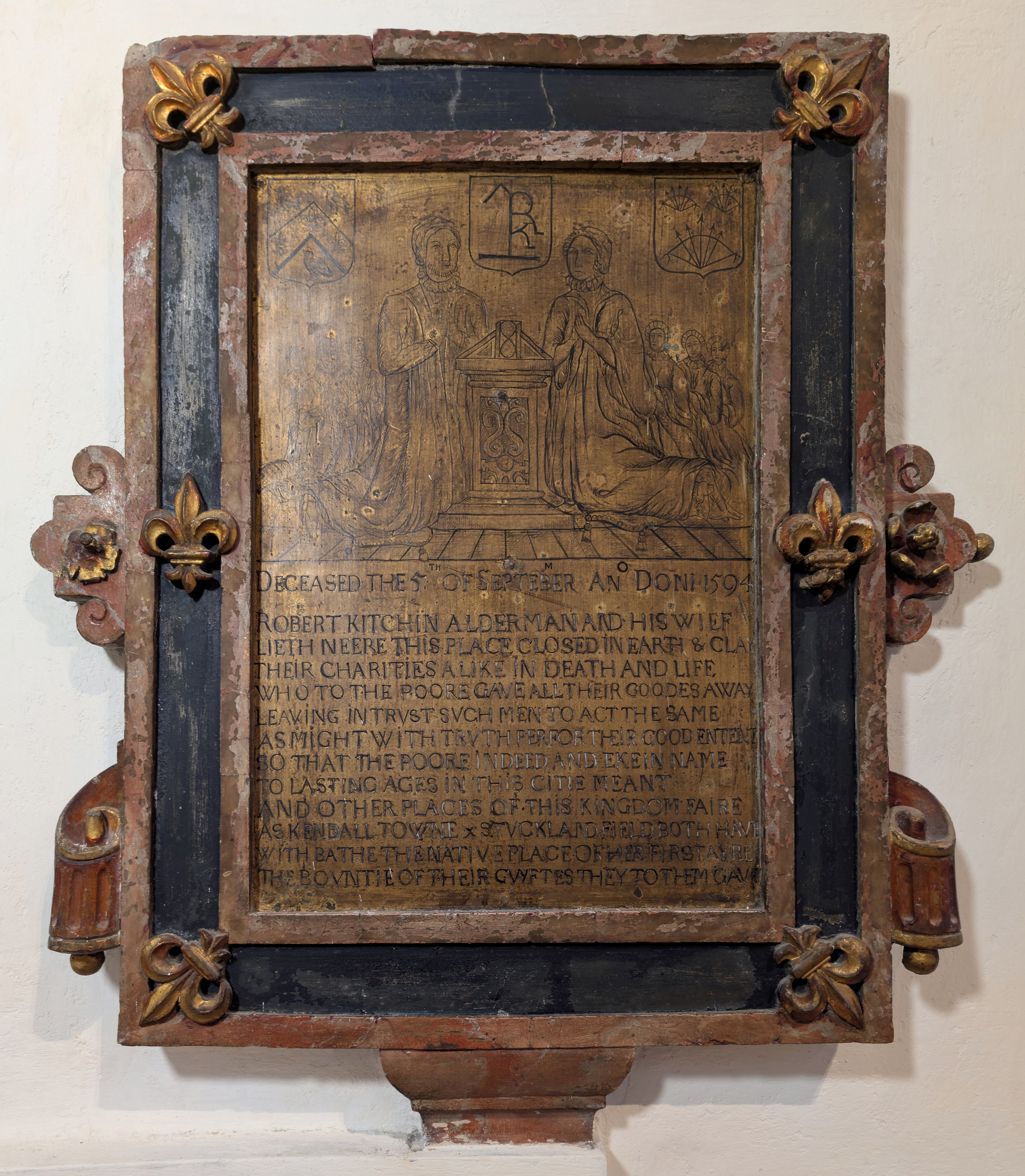
Monument to Robert Kitchin, 1594

Tomb with effigy of Sir George Snigge, 1617

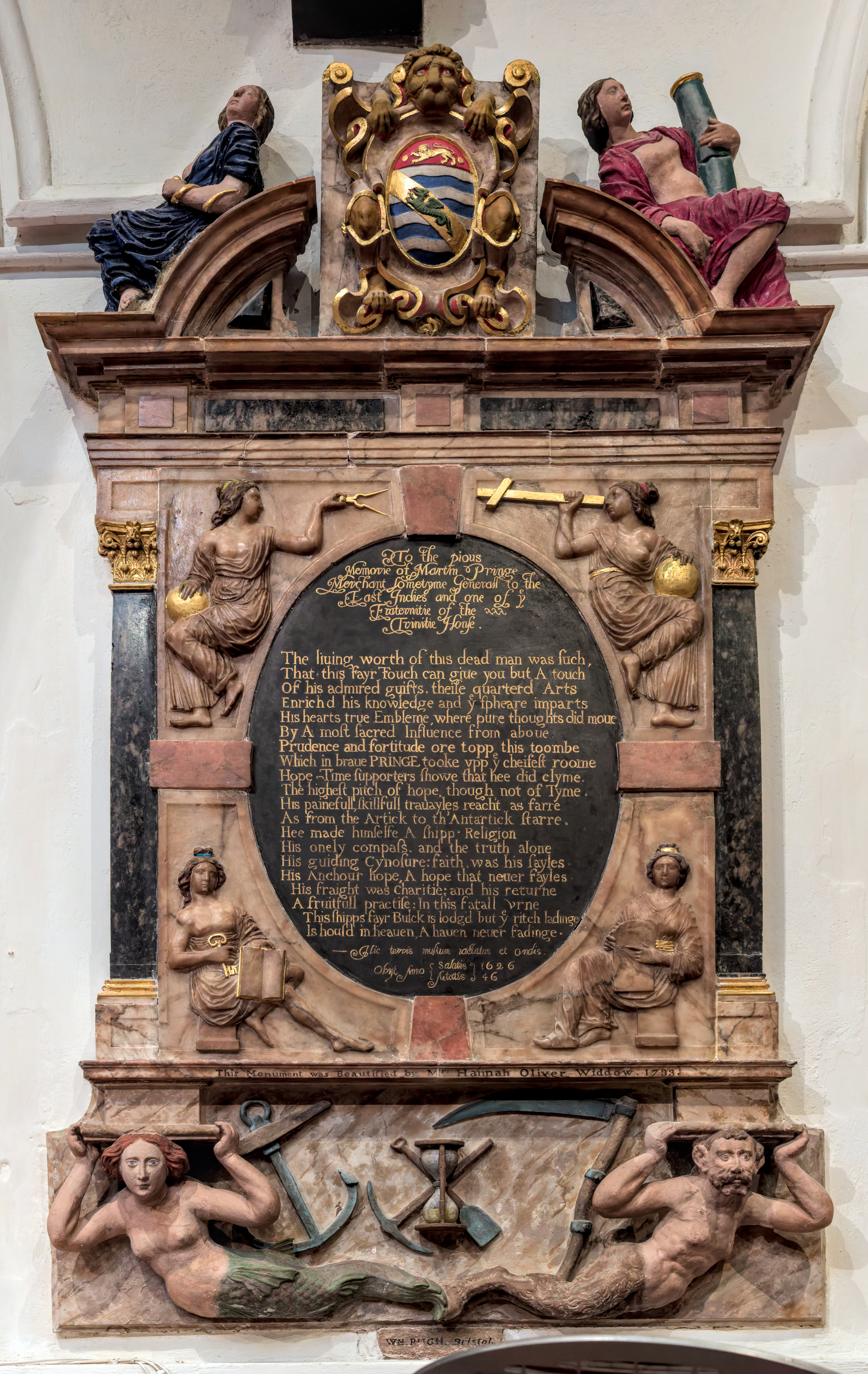
Monument to Martin Pring, 1627

== Archives ==
Parish records for St Stephen's church, Bristol are held at Bristol Archives (Ref. P. St S) (online catalogue) including baptism and marriage registers and a burial register. The archive also includes records of the incumbent, churchwardens, overseer of the poor, parochial church council, charities and vestry plus deeds.

== See also ==
- Churches in Bristol
- Grade I listed buildings in Bristol
- Ramsay MacDonald, first Labour Party Prime Minister
