= Bombay Time =

Former time zone in India

Bombay Time was one of the two official time zones established in British India in 1884. The time zone was established during the International Meridian Conference held at Washington, D.C. in the United States in 1884. It was then decided that India would have two time zones, Calcutta (now Kolkata), and Bombay (now Mumbai). Bombay Time was set at 4 hours and 51 minutes ahead of Greenwich Mean Time (GMT).

However, Bombay Time was difficult to convert to Indian Standard Time (IST) after it was adopted on 1 January 1906 as the official time zone of India. With public sentiment against the government, prominent barrister Pherozeshah Mehta argued against the change. He managed to stall proceedings in the Bombay Municipal Corporation for a few days by arguing that the government did not take the people into confidence. Faced with rising public resentment over the trial, the government shelved the conversion, and Bombay Time was maintained until 1955.

The Parsi fire temples of Mumbai still use the Bombay Time as certain rituals of the community are calculated with reference to the position of the sun at local time. The time is displayed on large clocks located near the gates of the fire temples.

== See also ==
- Calcutta Time
- Indian Standard Time
- Madras Time
- Port Blair mean time
- Railway time in India
- Time in India
- UTC+05:30
