= Bangladesh Standard Time =

Time zone used in Bangladesh

- Time zone
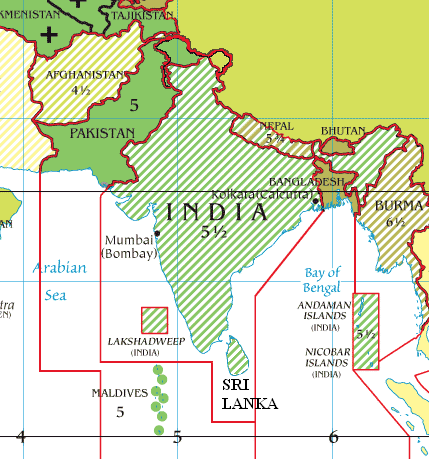
- Map of South Asia with time zones; Bangladesh is colored olive, the same as Bhutan

UTC offset
- BST: UTC+06:00

Current time
- 07:19, 1 December 2025 BST [refresh]

Observance of DST
- DST is not observed in this time zone.

Bangladesh Standard Time (BST; Bengali: বাংলাদেশ মান সময়) serves as the official time zone for Bangladesh. It operates six hours ahead of Coordinated Universal Time and is observed uniformly across the country as a national standard. In 2009, Bangladesh briefly observed daylight saving time (DST) as a measure to address an ongoing electricity crisis. However, this decision was reversed by the government in 2010.

The official time signal of BST is determined based on the 90.00° E longitude. This meridian passes through the Harukandi Union, located in the Harirampur Upazila of the Manikganj District, within the Dhaka Division. In the IANA time zone database, BST is represented by the identifier Asia/Dhaka.

== History ==
From 1890 to 1941, Bengal, under the British Raj adhered to Calcutta time (UTC+5:53:20).

During the 1940s, in the midst of World War II, British India underwent a series of time zone changes.

1. On 1 October 1941, the region transitioned to UTC+06:30.
2. On 15 May 1942, the following year, the region shifted to UTC+05:30.
3. On 1 September 1942, later that same year, the region reverted to UTC+06:30.

After the partition of India in 1947, the region was divided into the dominions of India and Pakistan. East Bengal, now known as Bangladesh, was part of this division. On 15 September 1951, Dacca Time (DACT) was introduced in East Bengal, which was UTC+06:00 achieved by subtracting 30 minutes from UTC+06:30. This is the official time zone in use today. On 30 September 1951, Dacca Time was officially implemented in East Bengal.

== Daylight saving time ==
The Power Division of the Ministry of Power, Energy and Mineral Resources proposed the DST scheme. This proposal was discussed with representatives from 18 to 19 different ministries on 5 April 2009, and they were requested to provide their views by 9 April. Most of the ministries responded positively to the proposal. The month of June was chosen for the implementation of DST, rather than April or May, due to the scheduling of the Higher Secondary Certificate (HSC) examinations, which run from 18 April to 28 May. On the midnight of 19 June, the time was advanced by exactly one hour. The plan was to revert to the original time two months later, on the midnight of 30 September. The primary aim of this proposal was to reduce energy consumption, as the period of the most severe energy crisis coincided with a power demand of 4,800–5,800 MW, against a generation capability of 3,800–4,000 MW. As a result of the DST scheme, the time zone was advanced from UTC+06:00 to UTC+07:00.

Government officials who supported the scheme argued that conserving power was more feasible than generating additional power. However, the scheme ultimately failed to meet its objectives. Criticism emerged just days after the scheme's implementation, as people struggled to adjust to the change. Businesses and shop owners did not fully comply with the government's directives. Citizens voiced complaints that the load-shedding situation had not improved. Any power savings were offset by increased consumption due to hot weather in the days following the change. Furthermore, any remaining savings were consumed by individuals who previously had limited access to electricity. Students and teachers were among the first to experience adverse effects, as many had to depart for their institutions before sunrise. By December, the situation worsened, leading the cabinet to abandon the scheme.

The country reverted to its original time offset of UTC+06:00 at midnight on 31 December 2009, several months later than initially planned and during the winter season. DST was initially planned to be observed again from 31 March to 31 October in 2010. However, on 22 March 2010, the cabinet made the decision to permanently cancel the scheme. They cited “public interest” as the primary reason for this decision and chose to maintain the previous time offset of UTC+06:00.
