= Sri Lanka Standard Time =

Time zone used in Sri Lanka

- Time zone
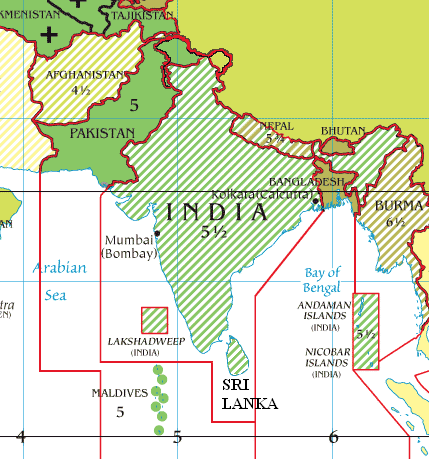
- Time zones of South Asia

UTC offset
- SLST: UTC+05:30

Current time
- 14:59, 3 September 2026 SLST [refresh]

Observance of DST
- DST is not observed in this time zone.

Sri Lanka Standard Time (SLST) (Sinhala: ශ්‍රී ලංකාවේ සම්මත වේලාව, romanized: Shri Lankavay Sammatha Velava, Tamil: இலங்கை நியம நேரம், romanized: Ilaṅkai niyama nēram) is the time zone for Sri Lanka. It is 5 hours and 30 minutes ahead of GMT/UTC (UTC+05:30) as observed since 15 April 2006.

Sri Lanka does not currently observe daylight saving time.

== History ==
On 15 April 2006, Sri Lanka Time reverted to match Indian Standard Time calculated from the Allahabad Observatory in India 82.5° (82°30') longitude East of Greenwich, the reference point for GMT. This time zone applies to the entirety of Sri Lanka.

Since 1880, the time zone in Sri Lanka (or formerly, Ceylon) has varied from UTC+05:30 to UTC+06:30.

- In 1880, Ceylon observed UTC+05:30.
- During World War II, in January 1942, when the Japanese were on the verge of invading Ceylon, the official time shifted to UTC+06:00.
- In September 1942, the official time further advanced to UTC+06:30.
- When the war ended in 1945, Ceylon reverted to UTC+05:30 to be in the same time zone as India. However, in May 1996, Sri Lanka switched to UTC+06:30 for daylight saving during a severe power shortage in Sri Lanka.
- In October 1996, official time was moved back by half an hour to UTC+06:00. However, Tamil Tiger-controlled areas observed a time zone of UTC+05:30.
- On April 15. 2006, the government changed the official time to UTC+05:30. By doing so, Sri Lanka aimed to align its time zone with that of India. English writer Sir Arthur C. Clarke, who was then staying in Sri Lanka, protested against the switch, arguing that it would make life inconvenient to everyone who has to relate to the rest of the world.

Sri Lanka briefly observed daylight saving time during World War II.

== See also ==
- Indian Standard Time
- Time in Sri Lanka
