= Abel Kitchin =

English Merchant and Mayor of Bristol

Abel Kitchin or "Kitchen" (died 1640) was an English merchant and Mayor of Bristol. He lived in Broad Street. Kitchin was Mayor of Bristol from 1612 to 1613. His business and shipping interests included the import of oil from Spain and the export of leather.

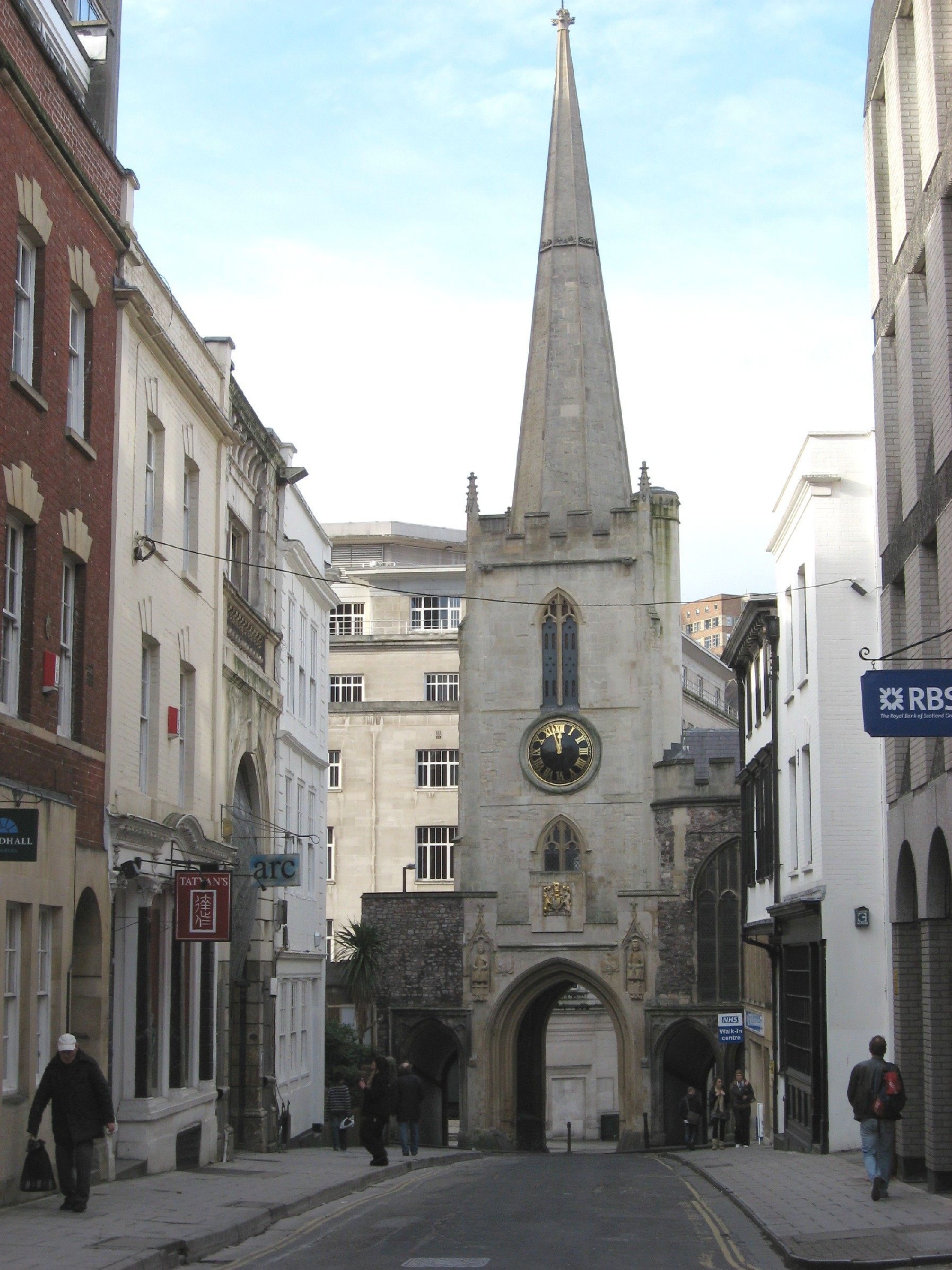
Broad Street, Bristol

== Kitchin and Anne of Denmark ==
Anne of Denmark went to Bristol on 4 June 1613 during her progress to Bath. Kitchin and the town council organised various entertainments. They met the queen at Lawford or Lafford's Gate, and Kitchin gave her a satin purse embroidered with the initials "AR".

A seat was built for her at Canon's Marsh near the Cathedral, where on 7 June she watched a staged battle at the confluence of the Avon and Frome, fought between an English ship and two Turkish galleys. After the victory, some Turkish prisoners were presented to her and she laughed at this, saying both the actors' red costumes and their "countenances" were like the Turks. The entertainment at Bristol was described in verse by Robert Naile, who mentions the Turks were played by sailors, "worthy brutes, who oft have seen their habit, form and guise". These actor-captives were made to kneel before Anne of Denmark and beg for mercy as the final act of the pageant.

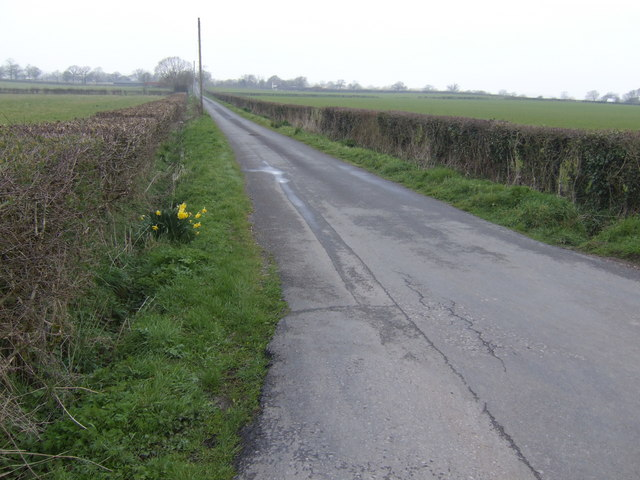
Lane near Wixoldbury Farm

That evening, the queen's lady in waiting Jane Drummond and others had dinner with Abel Kitchin, and gave him a ring from the queen, set with diamonds. On 8 June, Kitchen escorted the queen to Lafford's Gate and she went to Siston Court.

== Properties ==
In his will, Kitchin bequeathed the queen's ring to posterity in his son Abel's family. He owned properties including a farm called Wicks Ouldbury (Wixoldbury), with lands in the parishes of Wickwar and Cromhall, with Inlands in Wickwar, (lands held from the manor of Beverston), and a house called the Ragged Staff in Bristol's Broad Street.

== Family ==
His children included;

- Abel Kitchin junior (died 1640), who married, in 1627, Alice Baber, a daughter of John Baber, Parson of Tormarton, Doctor of Theology, and sister of John Baber (MP). Their daughter was Mary Kitchin.
- John Kitchin
- Mary Kithchin, who married Nicholas Meredith
- Sara Kitchin

A London lawyer, Richard Kitchin of Clifford's Inn, who died in 1604, left Abel Kitchen a house in Skipton. Richard Kitchin stood surety for Christopher Marlowe in October 1589 when the writer was a prisoner in Newgate, and he frequented the Mermaid Tavern.

== Bristol nails ==
The second oldest bronze nail (a pedestal table where bargains were made) at The Exchange, Bristol, was a gift from Robert Kitchin, merchant and former mayor, by his will of September 1594. An inscription dated 1630 records that Abel Kitchin, Alderman, was one of his four executors. It is not known if Robert Kitchin, who was originally from Kendal, was Abel Kitchin's father or uncle.
