= Calcutta Time =

Former time zone in British India

Calcutta Time was one of the two official time zones established in British India in 1884. It was established during the International Meridian Conference held at Washington, D.C. in the United States. It was decided that India had two time zones: Calcutta (now Kolkata) would use the 90th meridian east and Bombay (now Mumbai) the 75th meridian east. It was determined as 5 hours, 53 minutes and 20 seconds ahead of Greenwich Mean Time (UTC+5:53:20).

Calcutta Time was described as being 23 minutes and 20 second ahead of Indian standard time and one hour, two minutes and 20 seconds ahead of Bombay Time. It has also been described as 32 minutes and 6 seconds ahead of Madras Time (UTC+5:21:14).

Even when Indian Standard Time (IST) was adopted on 1 January 1906, Calcutta Time remained in effect until 1948 when it was abandoned in favour of IST.

In the latter part of the nineteenth century, Calcutta Time was the dominant time of the Indian part of the British empire with records of astronomical and geological events recorded in it. Willian Strachey, an uncle of Lytton Strachey was said to have visited Calcutta once and then "kept his own watch set resolutely to Calcutta Time, organizing the remaining fifty-six years of his life accordingly". James Clavell, in his novel King Rat, refers to news broadcasts as occurring in "Calcutta Time".

== See also ==
- Bombay Time
- Indian Standard Time
- Madras Time
- Port Blair mean time
- Railway time in India
- Time in India
- UTC+05:30
