= Indian Standard Time =

Time zone observed in India; UTC+05:30

- Time zone
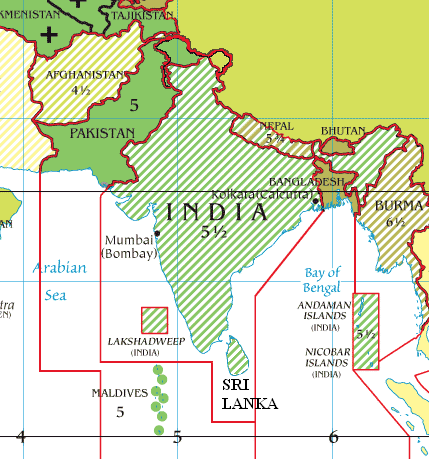
- Indian Standard Time

UTC offset
- IST: UTC+05:30

Current time
- 19:01, 11 August 2026 IST [refresh]

Observance of DST
- DST is not observed in this time zone.

Indian Standard Time (IST), also known as India Standard Time, is the time zone observed throughout the Republic of India, with a time offset of UTC+05:30. India does not observe daylight saving time or other seasonal adjustments. In military and aviation time, IST is designated E* ("Echo-Star"). It is indicated as Asia/Kolkata in the IANA time zone database.

== History ==
The Indian Standard Time was adopted on 1 January 1906 during the British era with the phasing out of its precursor Madras Time (Railway Time), and after Independence in 1947, the Union government established IST as the official time for the whole country, although Kolkata and Mumbai retained their own local time (known as Calcutta Time and Bombay Time) until 1948 and 1955, respectively. The Central observatory was moved from Chennai to a location at Shankargarh Fort in Allahabad district, so that it would be as close to UTC+05:30 as possible.

Daylight Saving Time (DST) was used briefly during the China–India War of 1962 and the Indo-Pakistani Wars of 1965 and 1971.

=== Former timezones ===
Time Zone	UTC	Period	Purpose
Bombay Time	UTC+04:51	1884–1955	Official
Calcutta Time	UTC+05:53:20	1884–1948	Official
Madras Time	UTC+05:21:14	1802–1906	Railways

== Calculation ==
Location of Mirzapur (near Allahabad) and the 82°30’ E longitude that is used as the reference longitude for IST

Indian Standard Time is calculated from the reference longitude of IST at 82°30'E passing near Vindhyachal of Mirzapur district in Uttar Pradesh. In 1905, the meridian passing east of Allahabad was declared as a standard time zone for British India and was declared as IST in 1947 for the Dominion of India. This longitude of 82°30'E was chosen as the standard meridian for the whole country as it is located centrally between western India (local time UTC +05:00) and northeastern India (local time UTC +06:00). Currently, the National Physical Laboratory of India maintains the Indian Standard Time with the help of the Allahabad Observatory.

== Criticisms ==
The country's east–west distance of more than 2,933 kilometres (1,822 mi) covers over 29° of longitude, resulting in the sun rising and setting almost two hours earlier on India's eastern border than in the Rann of Kutch in the far west. Inhabitants of the northeastern states have to advance their clocks with the early sunrise to avoid the extra consumption of energy after daylight hours.

In the late 1980s, a team of researchers proposed separating the country into two or three time zones to conserve energy. The binary system that they suggested involved a return to British-era time zones, but the recommendations were not adopted.

In 2001, the government established a four-member committee under the Ministry of Science and Technology to examine the need for multiple time zones and daylight saving. The findings of the committee, which were presented to Parliament in 2004 by the Minister of Science and Technology, Kapil Sibal, did not recommend changes to the unified system, stating that 'the prime meridian was chosen with reference to a central station, and that the expanse of the Indian State was not large.'

Though the government has consistently refused to split the country into multiple time zones, provisions in labour laws such as the Plantations Labour Act, 1951 allow the union and state governments to define and set the local time for a particular industrial area. In Assam, tea gardens follow a separate time zone, known as the Chaibagan or Bagan time ('Tea Garden Time'), which is one hour ahead of IST. Still, Indian Standard Time remains the only officially used time.

In 2014, Chief Minister of Assam Tarun Gogoi started campaigning for another time zone for Assam and other northeastern states of India. However, the proposal would need to be cleared by the union government.

In June 2017, the Department of Science and Technology (DST) indicated that it is once again studying the feasibility of two time zones for India. Proposals for creating an additional Eastern India Time (EIT at UTC+06:00), shifting default IST to UTC+05:00 and daylight saving (Indian Daylight Time for IST and Eastern India Daylight Time for EIT) starting on 14 April (Ambedkar Jayanti) and ending on 2 October (Gandhi Jayanti) was submitted to DST for consideration.

== Time signals ==
Official time signals are generated by the Time and Frequency Standards Laboratory at the National Physical Laboratory in New Delhi, for both commercial and official use. The signals are based on atomic clocks and synchronised with the worldwide system of clocks that support Coordinated Universal Time.

Features of the Time and Frequency Standards Laboratory include:

- High-frequency broadcast service operating at 10 MHz under call sign ATA to synchronise the user clock within a millisecond;
- Indian National Satellite System satellite-based standard time and frequency broadcast service, which offers IST correct to ±10 microsecond and frequency calibration of up to ±10^{−10}.
- Time and frequency calibrations made with the help of pico- and nanoseconds time interval frequency counters and phase recorders.

IST is taken as the standard time as it passes through almost the centre of India. To communicate the exact time to the people, the exact time is broadcast over the national All India Radio and Doordarshan television network. Telephone companies have dedicated phone numbers connected to mirror time servers that also relay the precise time. Another increasingly popular means of obtaining the time is through Global Positioning System (GPS) receivers.

As part of the Times Dissemination Project, which is overseen by the Ministry of Consumer Affairs, Food, and Public Distribution, NavIC will take the position of GPS as the reference time provider at the National Physical Laboratory from 2025. With an atomic clock in each of the four other centres—Ahmedabad, Bengaluru, Bhubaneswar, and Guwahati—the reference time from NavIC will be transmitted via an optical fibre link from the Faridabad centre. Indian Standard Time must be used as the exclusive time reference for official, commercial, administrative, and legal documents, according to draft regulations published by the Department of Consumer Affairs. Exceptions will be permitted for astronomy, navigation, and scientific research.

== See also ==
- Equation of time
- International Atomic Time
- John Goldingham
- Railway time in India
- Sri Lanka Standard Time
- Terrestrial Time
- Time in India
- Time in Sri Lanka
- Time zone (list)
- UTC+05:30
- Zoneinfo
