= UTC+04:51 =

Former time zone

UTC+04:51 is an identifier for a time offset from UTC of +04:51.

== History ==
This was used as Bombay time until 1955 when it closed the gap of 39 minutes behind Indian Standard Time (UTC+05:30).
