= Bahnzeit =

Bahnzeit (German, literally "railway time") may refer to:

- Bahnzeit, the German television programme produced by Mitteldeutscher Rundfunk on the subject of railways
- Bahnzeit, the former name (to May 2006) of DB Welt, the internal magazine for employees of the German national railway company, Deutsche Bahn
- Eisenbahnzeit, German for the time to be used for railway operations i.e. railway time
