= Charles Leigh (merchant) =

English merchant and voyager (died 1605)

- Born: England
- Died: March , 1605; On ship
- Occupation: Merchant
- Known for: Voyages to North and South America to establish colonies and trade
- Parent(s): John Leigh (father) and Joan Leigh (mother)

Charles Leigh (died 1605) was an English merchant and voyager.

== Life ==
He was younger son of John Leigh (died 31 March 1576) and of Joan, daughter and heir of John Oliph of Foxgrove, Kent, an alderman of London. His eldest brother was Sir Oliph Leigh (1560–1612).

=== Canada voyage ===
Charles Leigh fitted out, in partnership with Abraham van Harwick, two ships, the Hopewell of 120 and the Chancewell of 70 tons burden, for a voyage to St. Lawrence River; and sailed from Gravesend on 8 April 1597. Leigh and Stephen van Harwick, brother of Abraham, went as chief commanders. The purpose of the voyage was partly fishing and trade, but partly also to plunder Spanish ships.

They left Falmouth on 28 April, and after touching at Cape Race, and sighting Cape Breton Island, on 11 June the Hopewell anchored off the island of Menego–apparently St. Paul's–to the north of Cape Breton. They had lost sight of the Chancewell off the bay of Placentia. On the 14th they came to the Bird Rocks and on the 16th to Brian's Island. On the 18th they came to Ramea, today's Magdalen Islands. There in a harbour called Halabolina they found four ships, two French from St. Halo, the others from St. Jean de Luz. Leigh insisted that these must be Spaniards, and seized their powder as a measure of security. But next day the French gathered in force, to the number of 200, from other ships and residents in different parts of the island, retook the powder, claimed Leigh's largest boat, and drove the English out of the harbour.

Coming again to Menego and Cape Breton on the 27th they met a boat with eight of the Chancewell's men, from whom they learnt that the Chancewell had been wrecked on the coast of Cape Breton. After rescuing all the Chancewell's men, they crossed over to Newfoundland. On 25 July they took, after a sharp action in the harbour of St. Mary, a large Breton ship. Leigh moved to this ship, dividing the men between her and the Hopewell, and put to sea on 2 August.

They left the coast of Newfoundland on 3 August to make directly for England. The Hopewell parted company shortly afterwards, on an independent cruise off the Azores; but Leigh landed on the Isle of Wight on 5 September. A few days later his ship arrived in the River Thames, where she was made a prize.

=== South America voyage ===
After this, Leigh made other voyages, not well documented, with a view to establishing a colony to look for gold in Guiana.

Leigh sailed from Woolwich on 21 March 1604 in the Olive Plant, a barque of 50 tons, with a crew of 46. Master was Martin Prinx, identified as Martin Pring. He later led a mutiny against Leigh's settlement plans.

Touching at Mogador, sighting the Cape Verde Islands and some of the West Indies, they arrived on 11 May in the fresh water of the Amazon River. After some trading they left the Amazon; and on 22 May arrived in a river which Leigh calls the Wiapogo (Oyapoc).

The local Amerindians, who were oppressed by the Carib people, were anxious that the English should settle there; they gave them huts and clearings, supplied them with food, and expressed a desire to learn the Christian religion. One of them had been in England, and could speak a little English. Leigh went on an exploring expedition ninety miles up the river Aracawa, trading and making vain inquiries for gold. When he returned almost every one in the little colony was sick. On 2 July 1604 Leigh wrote to his brother giving an account of his proceedings, and desiring him to send out further supplies (letter dated from Principium or Mount Howard). At the same time he wrote to the council, asking for the king's protection for emigrants to the colony, and that preachers might be sent.

Supplies sent out by Sir Oliph Leigh arrived in January; they found everybody ill. Leigh himself was very weak and much changed. He resolved to go home, promising the men that he would come back to them as soon as possible. He was ready to go, but fell ill and died aboard his ship. He was buried on shore 20 March 1605.

== Notes ==
Attribution

This article incorporates text from a publication now in the public domain: Lee, Sidney, ed. (1892). "Leigh, Charles (d.1605)". Dictionary of National Biography. Vol. 32. London: Smith, Elder & Co.
