= Allahabad Observatory =

Observatory in Uttar Pradesh, India

The Allahabad Observatory, located in Jhusi, a suburb of Prayagraj (formerly Allahabad), Uttar Pradesh, India, is the centre responsible for maintaining the Indian Standard Time (IST). The observatory is located at 82.5°E longitude, which translates to an exact time difference of 5 hours and 30 minutes ahead of Coordinated Universal Time (UTC) i.e. UTC+05:30.

== See also ==
- List of astronomical observatories
