= St Nicholas Market =

Market in Bristol, England

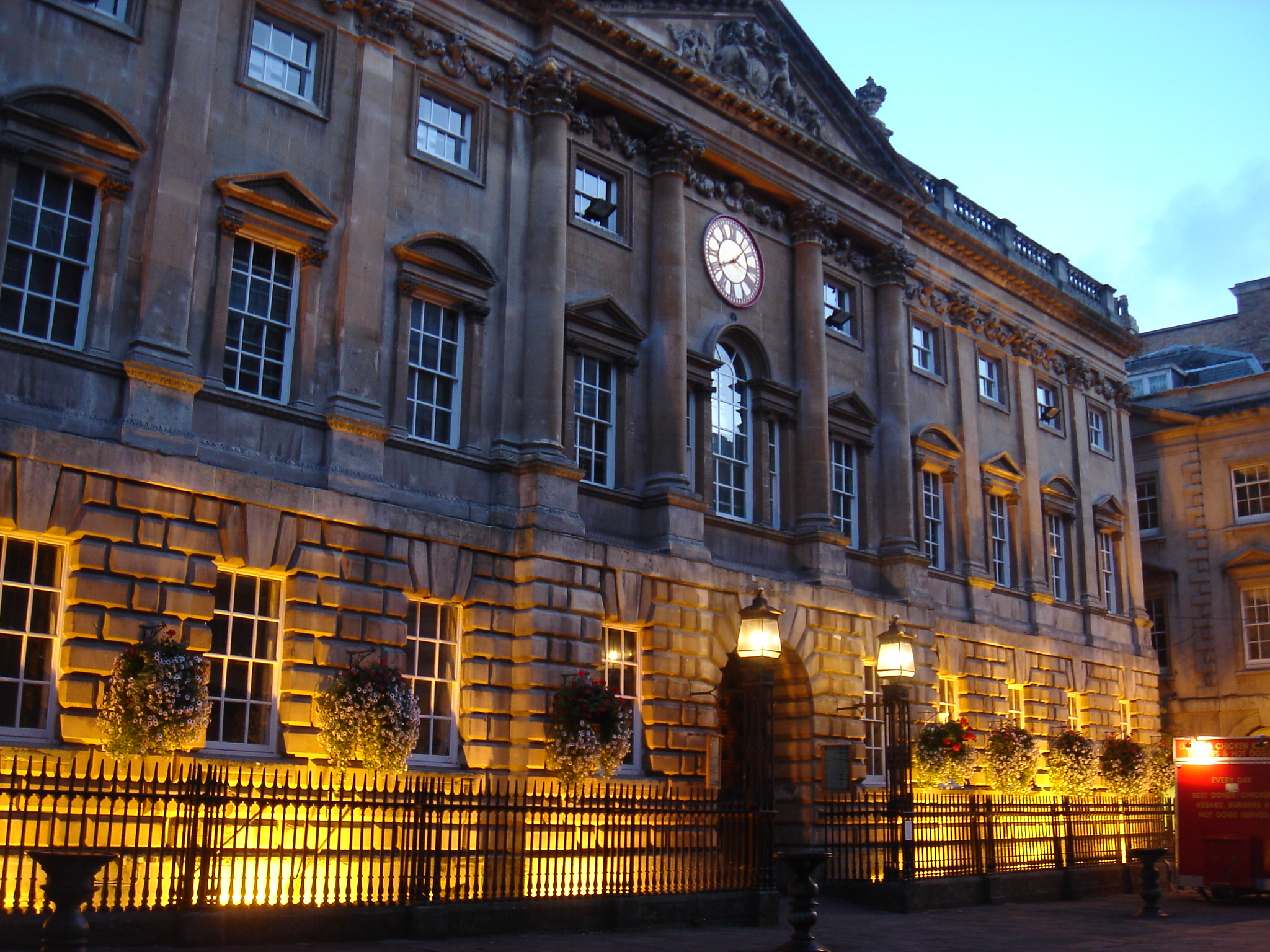
- The Exchange at dusk

- Location within Bristol

General information
- Location: The Exchange, Bristol, England
- Coordinates: 51.4544°N 2.5935°W
- Construction started: 1741
- Completed: 1743

Design and construction
- Architect: John Wood the Elder

Listed Building – Grade II*
- Official name: The Market
- Designated: 8 January 1959
- Reference no.: 1202292

St Nicholas Market is a market in The Exchange on Corn Street in Bristol, England. It is also home to the Bristol Farmers' Market, the Nails Market, and the Slow Food Market, all of which are located in front of the Exchange.

It was the location of the first Berni Inn in 1956, which became a large chain, at The Rummer, a historic pub. In 1959 it was designated a Grade II* listed *particularly important buildings of more than special interest) building.

== Gallery ==
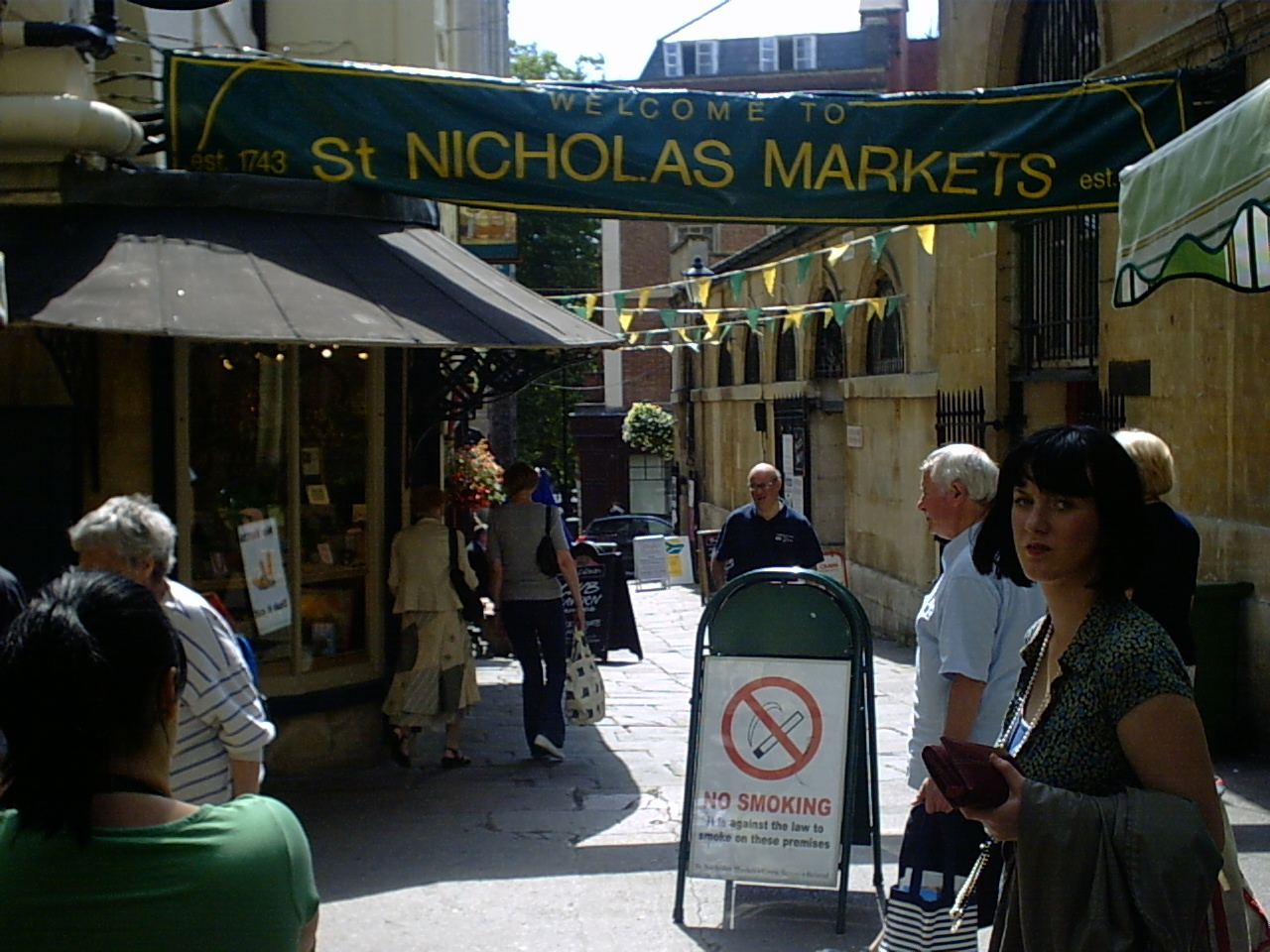
Banner at the entrance to The Market

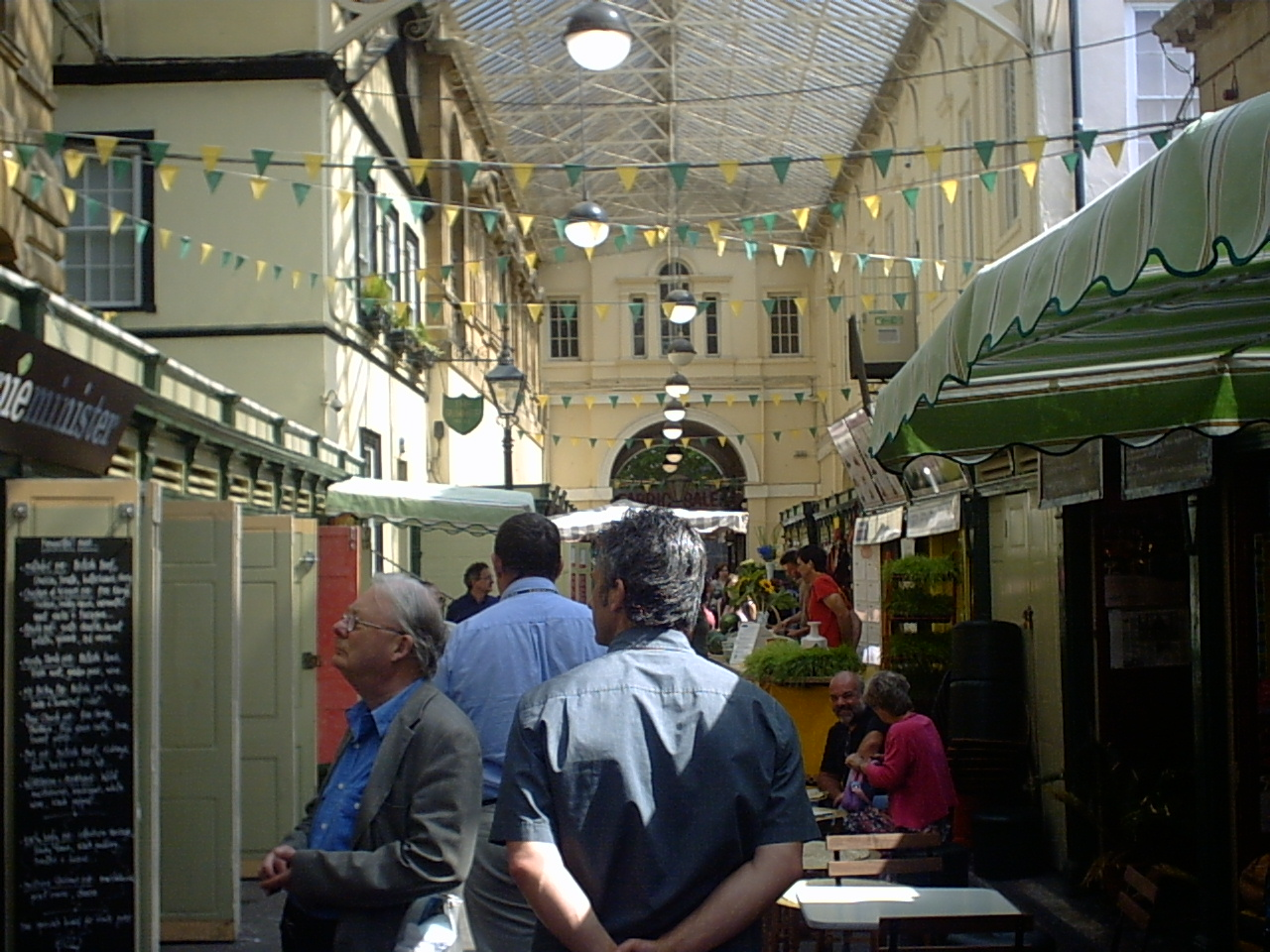
Shoppers in the farmers' market

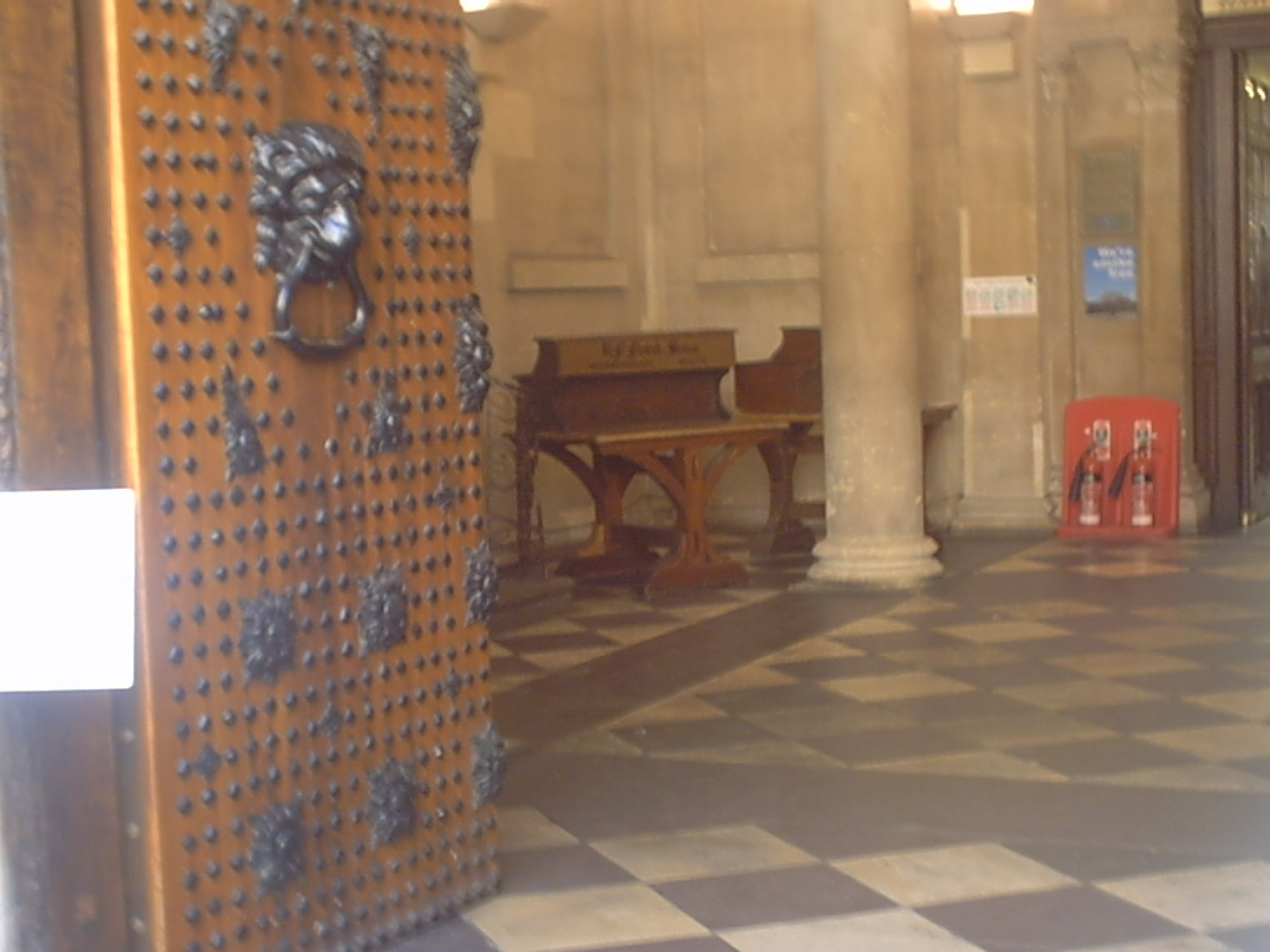
Large ornate door to the entrance of The Exchange

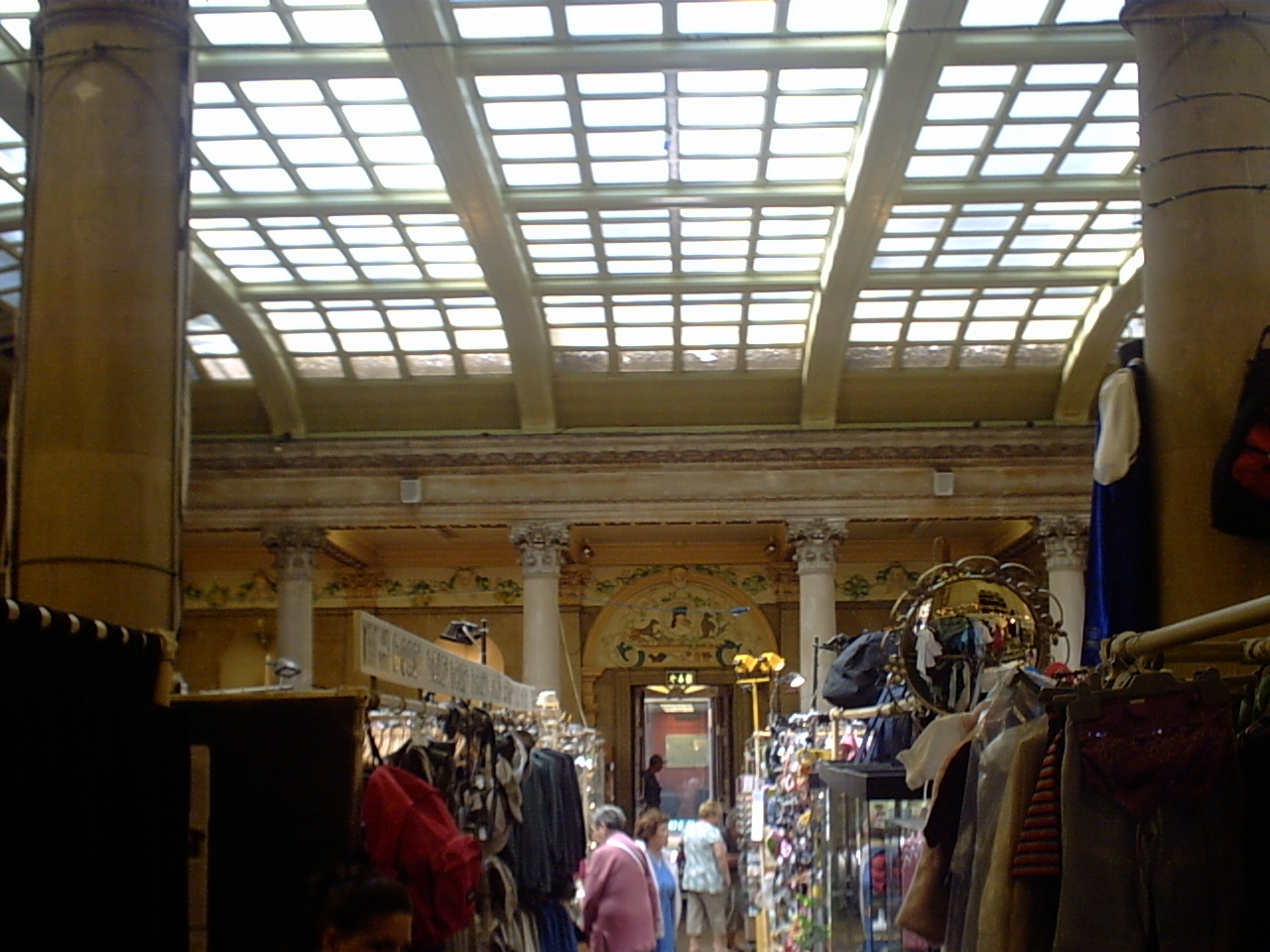
A view of the arcade

== See also ==
- Grade II* listed buildings in Bristol
