= Date and time notation in India =

ISO 8601 has been adopted as BIS IS 7900:2001 (Data elements and interchange formats – Information interchange – Representation of dates and times - first revision).

== Date ==
In India, the DD-MM-YYYY and DD/MM/YYYY are the two predominant short form representations of the date in the Gregorian calendar. The hyphen (-) and oblique (/) are both used as separator between the date fields. Almost all government documents need to be filled up in the DD-MM-YYYY or DD/MM/YYYY format. An example of DD-MM-YYYY usage is the passport application form, while the passport itself contains the date in DD/MM/YYYY format, as does the PAN card (used for taxation purposes).

But two expanded forms are used in India. The DD MMMM YYYY usage (e.g. 21 October 2022) is more prevalent over the MMMM DD, YYYY (e.g. October 21, 2022) usage except the latter is more used by media publications, such as the print version of the Times of India and The Hindu. Many government websites, including Prime Minister's official website, retain the historical format used by Britain (MMMM DD, YYYY) during the colonial era until sometime in the 20th century.

The month-day-year (12/31/1999) in short format, is never used in India except regionally in Bodo.

Mondays are the start of the week as per ISO 8601. Traditionally, Sunday is considered as the first day of the week in India and the official calendar published by the Government of India shows the day order from Sunday to Saturday with Monday depicted as the start of workweek with weekends falling on Saturday and Sunday. Indian Railway time tables follows the day order from 1 to 7 for railway scheduling with Day 1 as Monday and Day 7 as Sunday, e.g. train 12345 runs on Days 1, 2, 3, 4, and 5, in other words Monday through Friday.

== Time ==
The 12-hour notation is widely used in daily life, including both spoken and written communication. The 24-hour notation is typically used in transportation, e.g. railway and aviation timetables, and in military contexts. The HH:MM:SS time format is used.

== See also ==
- Time in India
- Hindu calendar
- Hindu units of time
- History of measurement systems in India
- Daylight saving time
- Daylight saving time by country
