= Martin Pring =

Early 17th-century English explorer of North America

- Born: 1580
- Died: 1626 (in Julian calendar)
- Resting place: St Stephen's Church
- Occupation: Large estate owner

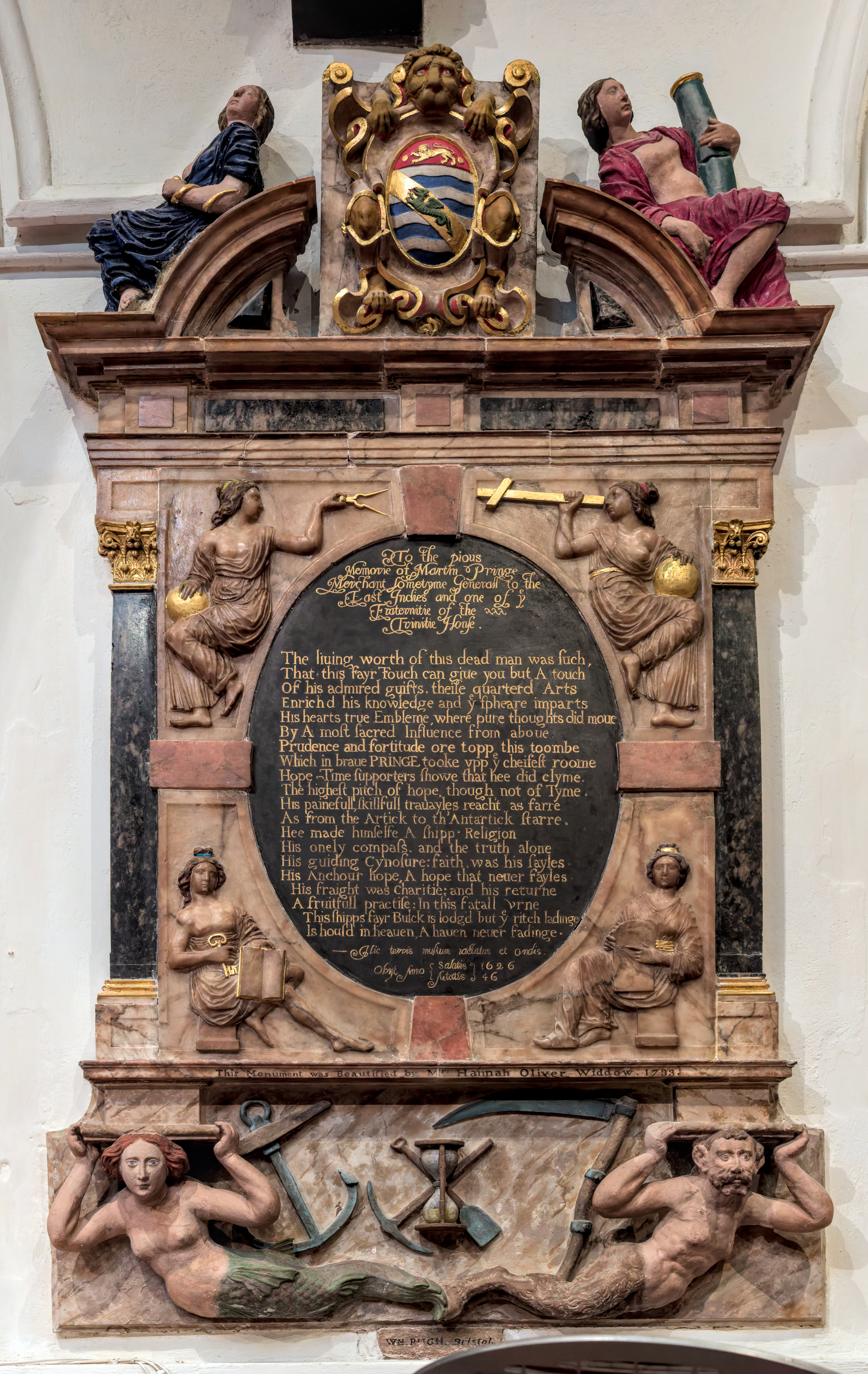
Monument to Martin Pring in St Stephen's Church, Bristol

Martin Pring (1580–1626) was an English explorer from Bristol, England who in 1603 at the age of 23 was captain of an expedition to North America to assess commercial potential; he explored areas of present-day Maine, New Hampshire, and Cape Cod in Massachusetts. Pring and his crew were the first known Europeans to ascend the Piscataqua River. It is thought that Italian explorer Giovanni da Verrazzano explored this part of the New England coast in 1524-25 looking for a route to the Far East, but he did not make landfall until he reached the St. Lawrence River further north.

In 1606 Pring returned to America and mapped the Maine coast. Later he became a ship's master, sailing for the East India Company and exploring in East Asia. He also prevented other nations from trading in the area. By 1619 he commanded all the Company's naval forces.

Returning to England in 1621, Pring was made a member of the Virginia Company and granted land in the Chesapeake Bay area. After leaving the East India Company in 1623, he served as a privateer for England, capturing several French and Spanish ships.

== Early life and education ==
Martin Pring was born and raised in Feniton, Devonshire. The parish registers record his baptism in the church on 23 April 1580, son of John Pringe of Thorne, (born 1540bfr., buried 6 February 1630 in Feniton) who married (on 30 June 1561 in Feniton) Mary Clarke. Historians have not discovered details about his early life, but he apparently learnt early about sailing out of Bristol. He started working on ships.

== 1603 North America voyage ==
In 1603, under patronage of the mayor, aldermen and merchants of Bristol, including Richard Hakluyt, Pring at the age of 23 was appointed as captain to command a ship and bark to explore the northern parts of the territory known as Virginia in North America and assess its commercial potential, financing it against a return cargo of sassafras. His flagship, the Speedwell, was of 60 tons and 30 men. (A different Speedwell was one of those used by members of the Plymouth Colony 17 years later for their 1620 trip to America.) It was escorted by a barque, the Explorer (also known as Discoverer), of 26 tons and 13 men. The expedition was licensed by Sir Walter Raleigh and departed 10 April 1603.

The two ships first made landfall about two months later at the entrance of Penobscot Bay in what is now the state of Maine. Heading west, they visited the mouths of the Saco, Kennebunk and York rivers, all of which Pring found "to pierce not far into the land." In June, they arrived at the Piscataqua River, a tidal estuary, which is described as the westernmost and best river. Pring explored 10–12 miles into the interior by means of the Piscataqua, the center of which now forms part of the border between Maine and New Hampshire. He and his crew are the first Europeans known to have done so.

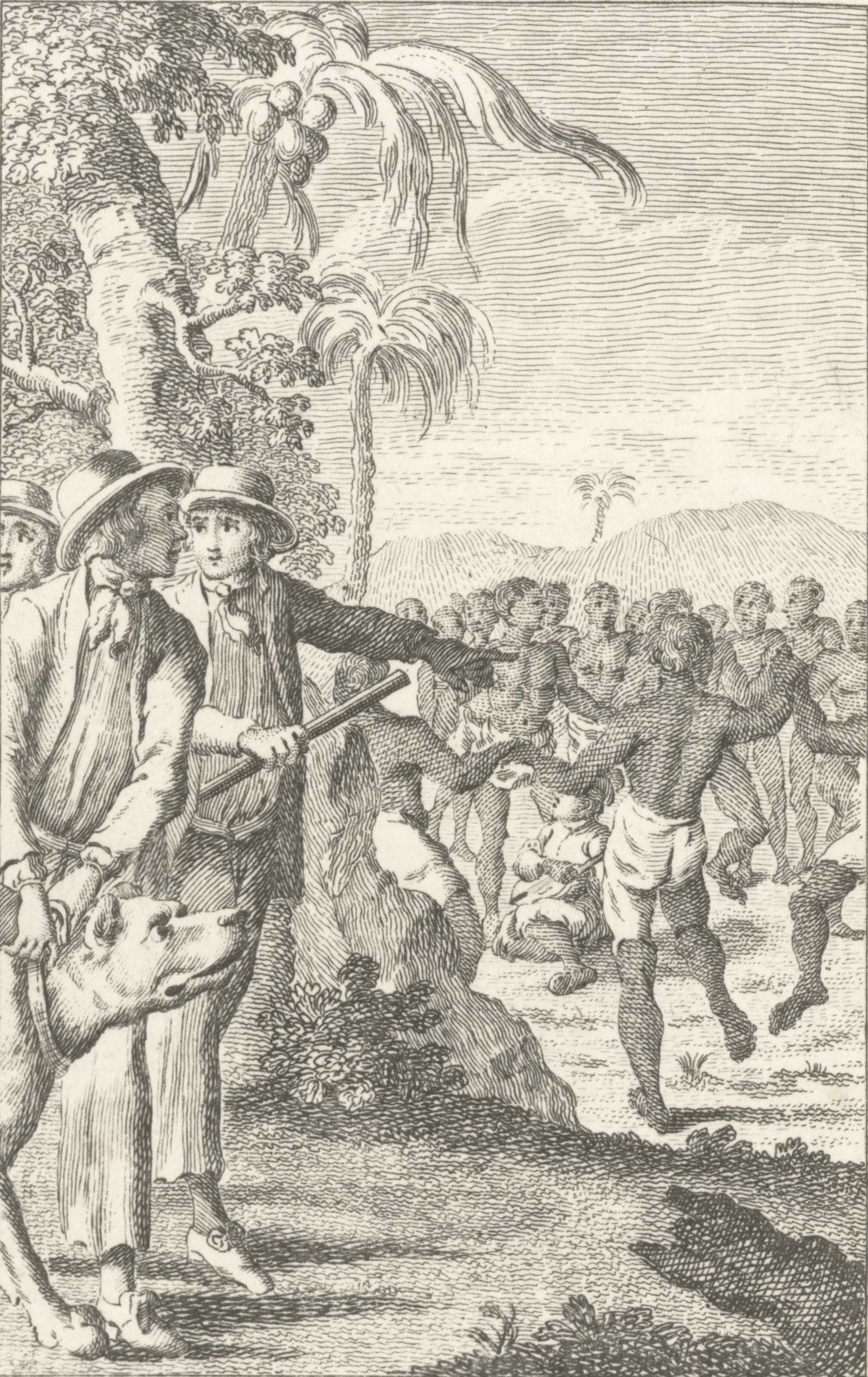
Indians dance round an English Boy who was playing on a gittern, 1603

Anchoring the Speedwell at the lower harbour, Pring boarded the smaller Explorer and, aided by oarsmen, ascended the Piscataqua. They sounded its depth, which they found impressive, and explored its banks. Pring admired the area's "goodly groves and woods." They encountered the native Abenaki people. Pring's description of them provides significant details of pre-colonial Native American life. At that time of year, the Abenaki would likely have been upriver at the Piscataqua's tributaries, where fish and game were plentiful around the numerous falls. Pring must have been anticipating unwelcome Native activity because his party brought with them on the Piscataqua "two excellent Mastives [sic]" (English Mastiffs), one of which "would carrie a halfe-Pike in his mouth". Of the use of these dogs Pring wrote: "when we would be rid of the Savages company wee would let loose the Mastives, and suddenly without cry[ing out] they would flee away."

They found sassafras in sufficient quantity in a bay, and immediately built a barricade for defense against the Native inhabitants. Pring called it "Whitson Bay" and a nearby hill "Mount Aldworth" after two of his merchant financiers in Bristol: John Whitson and Robert Aldworth. Pring's Whitson Bay has been identified with several locations in Massachusetts: Provincetown, Plymouth, where the Mayflower settlers later landed, and two locations on Martha's Vineyard, Old Town Harbor in Edgartown and Vineyard Haven. (Note: Bancroft believed that "Whitson Bay" was at Old Town Harbor in Edgartown, which would be consistent with Pring's statement that it was in "the latitude of 41. degrees and odd minutes", as would Vineyard Haven. Jeremy Belknap credited Peleg Coffin of Nantucket with identifying Edgartown Harbor as Whitson Bay. Burrage wrote that it was at Plymouth. Salisbury favors Provincetown Harbor.)

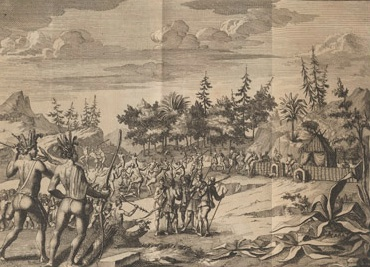
Pring's barricade, illustration in a 1706 Dutch translation of the account in Samuel Purchas's Pilgrimes

Pring wrote that they were constantly visited by groups of Natives as large as "one hundred and twentie at once". He does not explain, however, how relations with the locals deteriorated from harmony (Note: Pring tells the story of locals charmed by the playing of the zither ("gitterne") by a sailor, who the Natives paid tobacco, pipes and snakes skins to play, while they "danced twentie in a Ring ... singing Io Ia Io Ia Ia Io") to the day when the settlers fired their cannon and set the mastiffs on 140 of them. Salisbury suggests that it likely had to do with the abrupt conduct of the English, insensitivity to local customs (which they used only when convenient), and their use of the dogs against the indigenous peoples.

The expedition spent two months ashore at the mouth of the Pamet River on Cape Cod, in what is now Truro, Massachusetts. The explorers erected a small stockade below Cornhill, which would be noted by the Pilgrims on their subsequent journey to the New World. Subsisting on a variety of fish and game, Pring's men harvested sassafras trees for export to England.

The Explorer departed first with a load of sassafras. Pring's ship Speedwell was attacked by a large force of Wampanoag, but the ship's two Mastiffs had woken the guard and held off the warriors. As the ship departed, warriors burned the woods on shore and more than 200 shouted at the sailors. The natives had earlier fled the area where the expedition camped. Pring's men had found one of their birch bark canoes, described in detail and said to weigh 60 pounds, which was carried back to England. He departed 8 or 9 August, and reached England on 2 October.

== Guiana and second North America voyages ==
Pring sailed as master of the ship Phoenix in the Leigh expedition in 1604. He escaped the poor fate of Leigh's party by abandoning the venture, boarding an Amsterdam ship back home.

Lord Chief Justice Sir John Popham appointed Pring to make a second voyage to North America and assess the Maine coast in 1605. His mapping work under direction of Sir Ferdinando Gorges helped influence the selection of a site for a new colony.

== Later career ==
Pring continued to participate in commercial expeditions that created important trade networks and laid the base for colonization. He started to work for the East India Company, where by 1613 he served as ship's master. He helped exclude the Spanish and Portuguese from East Indies markets. By 1619, he commanded all of the naval forces for the Company.

In 1618, sailing with the 1000-tonne flagship Royal James (launched 1617) and a fleet including the Royal Anne, the Gift, and the Bull and the Bee, Pring travelled to Sumatra for the East India Company. He reached Jakarta in September 1618 to confront the Dutch, after they had attacked English merchants in the Moluccas. Pring was joined by Thomas Dale with another fleet of six English ships to fight the Dutch in Banten Bay. Pring captured a wealthy Dutch merchant ship having left Japan, then sailing to Coromandel Coast for repairs.

Pring took over command of the fleet in August 1619 when Dale died in Machilipatnam. In the Sunda Strait near to the Sumatra coastline, he met three more English ships of another fleet, which had been pursued by the Dutch from Java after having set anchor there. Pring decided to send 3 ships north and to proceed to Japan himself to gain needed repair and provisions for the fleet. With another 2 English ships, the Elizabeth and the Bull, he sailed to Japan on 23 July 1620, docking at Hirado Island, the only trading access allowed to foreigners. He made contact with the factor Richard Cocks and departed Japan carrying the will of the recently bereaved East India Company employee William Adams on 26 December 1620.

In 1621 Pring returned to England, where he was made a freeman of the Virginia Company. He was granted 200 acres. Although he resigned from the Dutch East Indies Company in 1623, he soon returned to sea, serving as a privateer for England. He took many prizes in French and Spanish trading ships.

Pring's short account of his first expedition to America was published in 1625 and is included in the fourth volume of Samuel Purchas's Pilgrimes. It provides valuable material about the lives of the pre-colonial Abenaki and Wampanoag, as well as Pring's descriptions of geography, plants and animals. The explorer died in 1626 at the age of 46 and was buried in Bristol, where his tomb survives in St Stephen's church.

== Bibliography ==
- Bancroft, George (1862). History of the United States, from the Discovery of the American Continent: History of the Colonization of the United States. Vol. 1. Boston, Massachusetts: Little, Brown, & Co.
- Burrage, Henry S., ed. (1906). Early English and French voyages, chiefly from Hakluyt, 1534–1608. New York: Charles Scribner's Sons. (The work consists of first-hand accounts of early voyages to the New World, with introduction and notes by Burrage.)
- Purchas, Samuel, ed. (1625). Hakluytus posthumus, or, Purchas his Pilgrimes. Contayning a history of the world, in sea voyages, & lande-travells, by Englishmen and others …. London: Imprinted for H. Fetherston. The original imprint was "In fower parts, each containing five bookes". All four volumes (parts) are hosted online by the Library of Congress The 1905–07 reproduction was printed in 20 volumves (one for each "book"): Purchas, Samuel, ed. (1905). Hakluytus posthumus. Works issued by the Hakluyt Society. Extra series; no. 14-33. Glasgow: J. MacLehose and Sons.
- Levermore, Charles Herbert, ed. (1912). Forerunners and Competitors of the Pilgrims and Puritans: or, Narratives of Voyages Made by Persons Other than the Pilgrims and Puritans of the Bay Colony to the Shores of New England during the First Quarter of the Seventeenth Century, 1601–1625, with Especial Reference to the Labors of Captain John Smith in Behalf of the Settlement of New England. Brooklyn, New York: The Society [New England Society of Brooklyn]. LCCN a17000511. The work is hosted on the Internet Archive: Volume 1 and Volume II.
- Salisbury, Neal (1982). Manitou and Providence: Indians, Europeans, and the Making of New England, 1500–1643. New York: Oxford University Press. ISBN 0195034546.
