= Time and Frequency Standards Laboratory =

Part of the NPL which maintains and calibrates Indian Standard Time

The Time and Frequency Standards Laboratory is a part of the National Physical Laboratory in New Delhi which maintains and calibrates the Indian Standard Time.

== Features ==
Features of the Time and Frequency Standards Lab include:

- Four caesium and rubidium atomic clocks
- An innovative time service via telephone line known as Teleclock service was launched on 28 July 2009. After successful commissioning this type of service in Nepal and Saudi Arabia, initiation of similar service in SAARC countries are being planned.
- INSAT satellite-based standard time and frequency broadcast service which offers IST correct to ±10 microsecond and frequency calibration up to ±100 picoseconds.
- Time and frequency calibrations are made with the help of pico- and nano-seconds time interval, frequency counters, and phase recorders.

In the past, it once offered HF broadcast service operating at 10 MHz under call sign ATA to synchronise the user clock within a millisecond.

== See also ==
- Time and frequency metrology
