= Robert Kitchin =

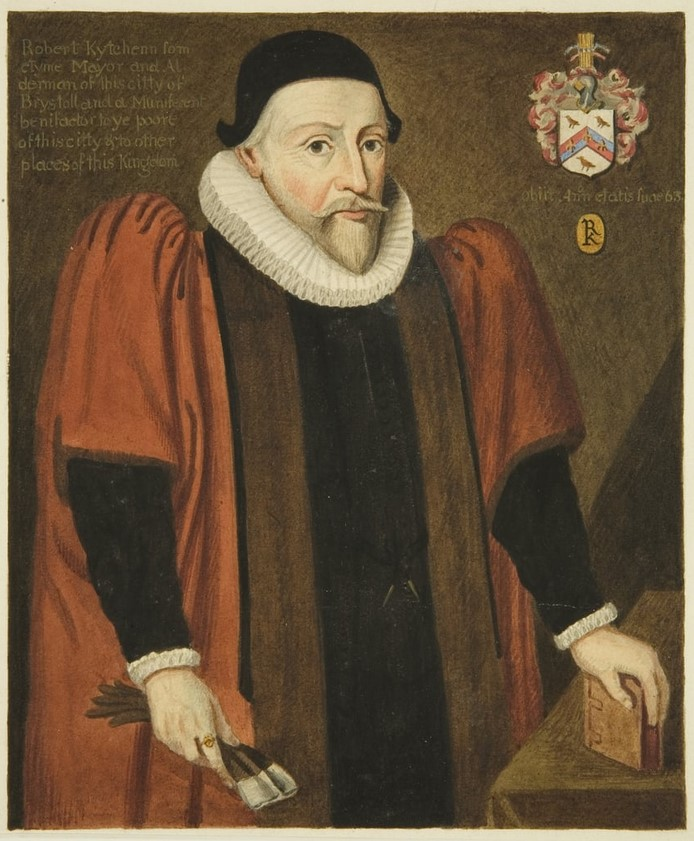
"Robert Kytchinn" and his coat of arms; 19th-century copy oil on canvas taken from another painting in the counsil house

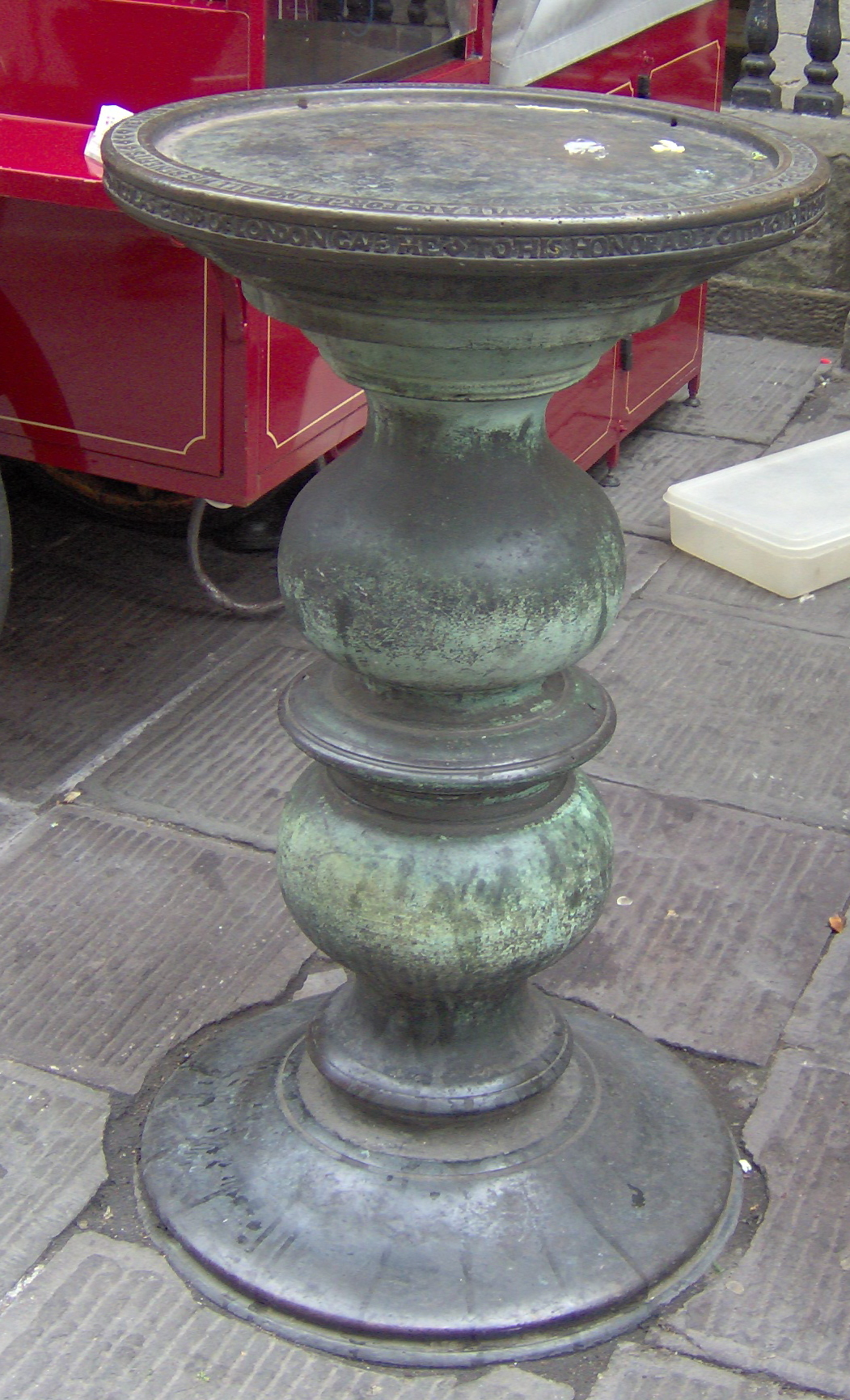
One of the four bronze tables known as 'nails' in front of The Exchange, Bristol

Sir Robert Kitchen (alt. Kytchen) was Alderman of Bristol. He died on 19 June 1594. He gifted one of the four bronze 'nails' (merchants' counting tables) to The Exchange in Bristol.

Abel Kitchin, later Mayor of Bristol, was one of his four executors. It is not known if Robert Kitchin, who was originally from Kendal, was Abel Kitchin's father or uncle.
