= Port Blair mean time =

Former time zone in the Andaman and Nicobar Islands

Port Blair mean time was the time zone of the Andaman and Nicobar Islands of India in the Bay of Bengal. The time zone was set up during the early 19th century and has been described as 17 minutes and 17 seconds (UTC+6:10:37) ahead of Calcutta Time (UTC+5:53:20). It remained in effect until 1 January 1906 when Indian Standard Time became the official time of India.
