= The Exchange, Bristol =

Grade I listed building in Bristol, UK

The Exchange
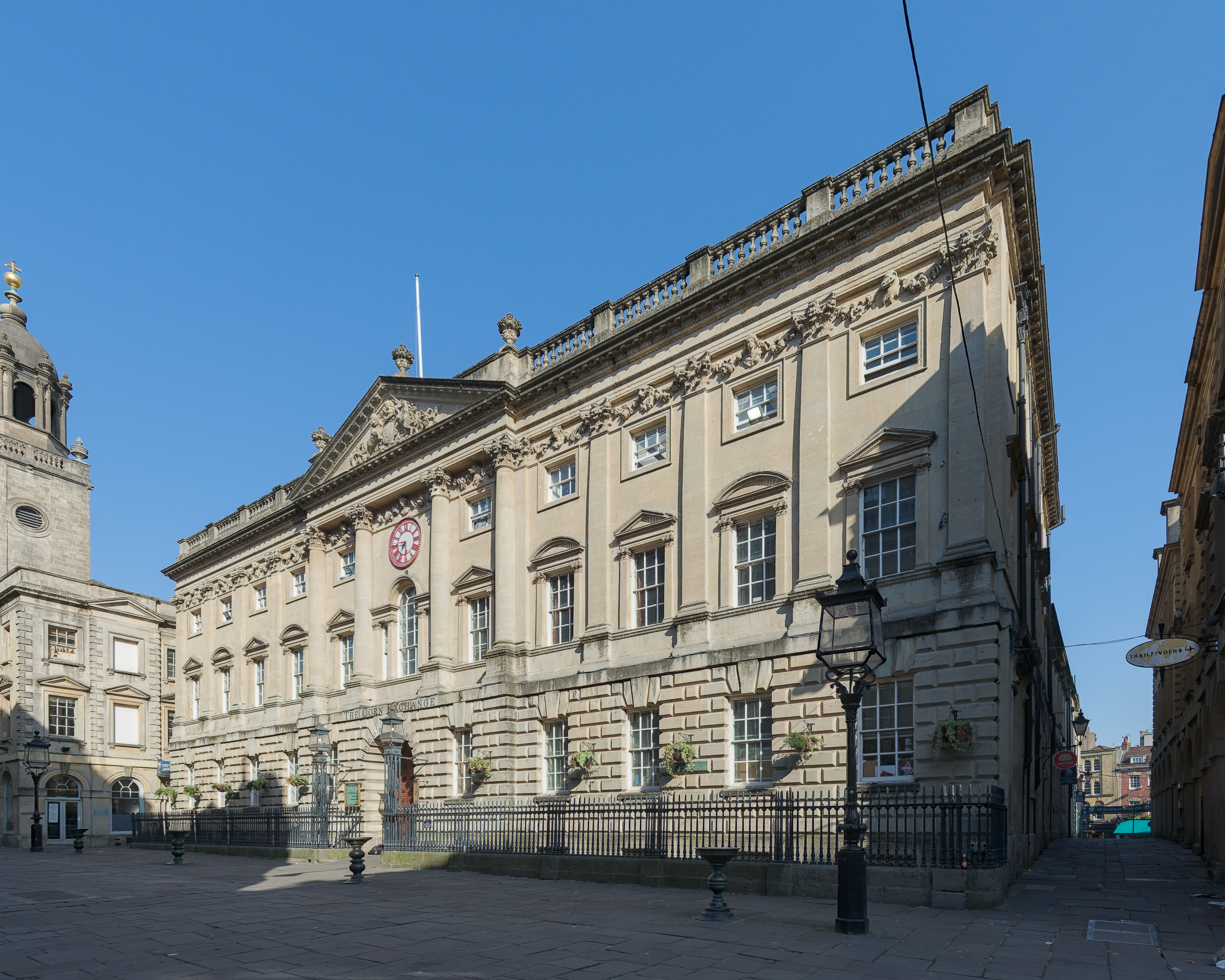

- Location within Bristol

General information
- Architectural style: Georgian Palladian
- Location: Bristol, England
- Coordinates: 51.4544°N 2.5935°W
- Construction started: 1741
- Completed: 1743

Design and construction
- Architect: John Wood the Elder

Listed Building – Grade I
- Official name: The Exchange
- Designated: 8 January 1959
- Reference no.: 1298770

The Exchange is a Grade I listed building built in 1741–43 by John Wood the Elder, on Corn Street, near the junction with Broad Street in Bristol, England. It was previously used as a corn and general trade exchange but is now used as offices and it also accommodates St Nicholas Market.

The Exchange underwent major building work in 1872, including roofing over the courtyard, and again in the early 1900s when the City Valuer's Department moved to the building. Since World War II the external clock tower has been removed and the roof lowered.

Outside the building are four bronze tables dating from the 16th and 17th centuries, known as "nails," at which merchants carried out their business. At the front of the building is a clock showing both Greenwich Mean Time and "local time".

== History ==
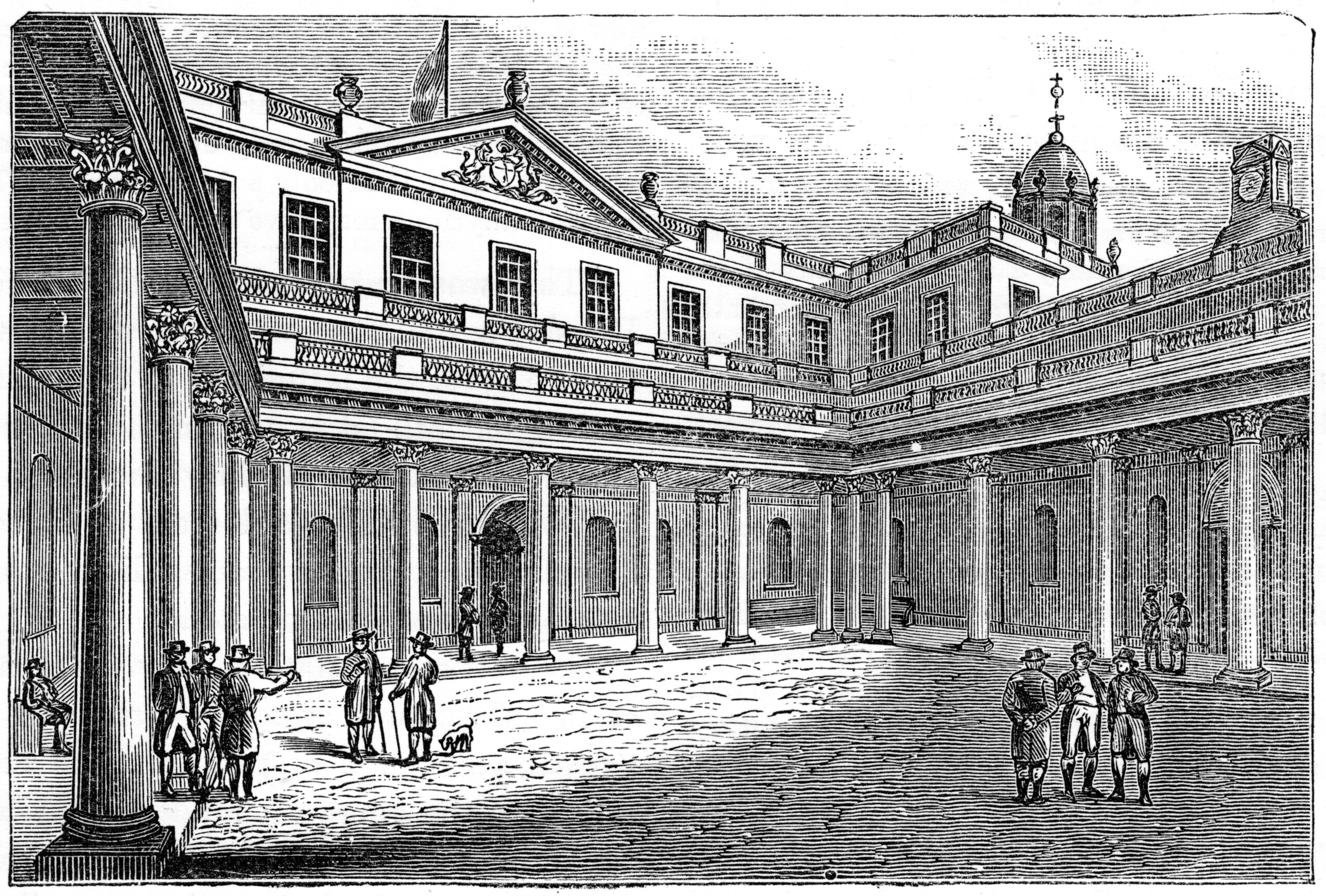
The Courtyard (1822) engraving

The Exchange was built in 1741–43 by John Wood the Elder, with carvings by Thomas Paty. Wood was also the architect of the Liverpool Exchange, which was completed in 1754 and gutted by fire in 1795. The London Exchange of Wood's day was also destroyed by fire in 1838. Bristol's Exchange is therefore unique, the only surviving 18th-century exchange building in England.

When finished in 1743 the Exchange, as planned, had "the outward appearance of one grand structure,” and the much-admired exterior remains today largely as built. The front of the building has Corinthian columns in the centre and pilasters to the sides. A central semicircular-arched doorway has cast-iron lion-head knockers. A frieze with human and animal heads symbolises trade, and a Royal Coat of Arms is displayed in the tympanum. The rear of the building is symmetrical with pedimented windows and semicircular ground-floor arches.

Internally, however, it consisted of various spaces. On either side of the front entrance in Corn Street were a coffeehouse and tavern, each of four storeys. Above and below the main entrance were rooms designed as strongrooms. In the centre of the Exchange was an open court, surrounded by a colonnade. At the back of the building was a two-storey range, consisting of an arcade on the ground floor and a long first-floor room. Facing All Saints Lane were two four-storey houses for business or trades persons, and on the frontage to Exchange Avenue were a further three houses. Below these various elements were cellars. Those below the five houses were each separate; the others were mostly interconnected.

In 1872 a major programme of building works was undertaken to a design by Edward Middleton Barry. This provided a roof over the central court of the Exchange and a new suite of offices on the first floor above the colonnades around the court. Other internal alterations appear to have been made in the late 19th century, possibly also by Barry in 1872. This is uncertain as Barry's plans are yet to be found.

The use of the building as an agricultural exchange declined significantly in the wake of the Great Depression of British Agriculture in the late 19th century. Further extensive alterations were made in the 1900s when the City Valuer's Department moved to the Exchange in 1907. These included the provision of a lift from the basement and cellars to the first floor and major alterations to the cellars under the central part of the Exchange. Since 1945 further alterations have included the replacement of the roof over the central court by a temporary roof at a lower level, the removal of the clock tower at the back of the building and the internal rebuilding of all four floors of the coffeehouse together with the corresponding floors over the main entrance.

Despite its name it was intended for merchants of all types, and a number directly involved in the Guinea and West Indian slave trade used it for business transactions. Inside the Corn Exchange the plasterwork in the main hall represents the four corners of the world, including Africa and America, the latter wearing a headdress of tobacco leaves. On the outside of the building are carvings of African, American, Asian and European figures and animals, again symbols of Bristol's foreign trade including the Bristol slave trade.

During the 1960s the Exchange was a popular concert venue: performers at that time included The Rolling Stones in December 1963, The Who in May 1965, and The Spencer Davis Group in July 1965, as well as Cream in January 1967.

Today the Exchange is designated as a Grade I listed building. Always owned by the City of Bristol, the building has served a variety of purposes, currently housing offices of both the former City Valuer's Department, Market Traders and the Joint Trade Unions Safety Office.

== Nails ==
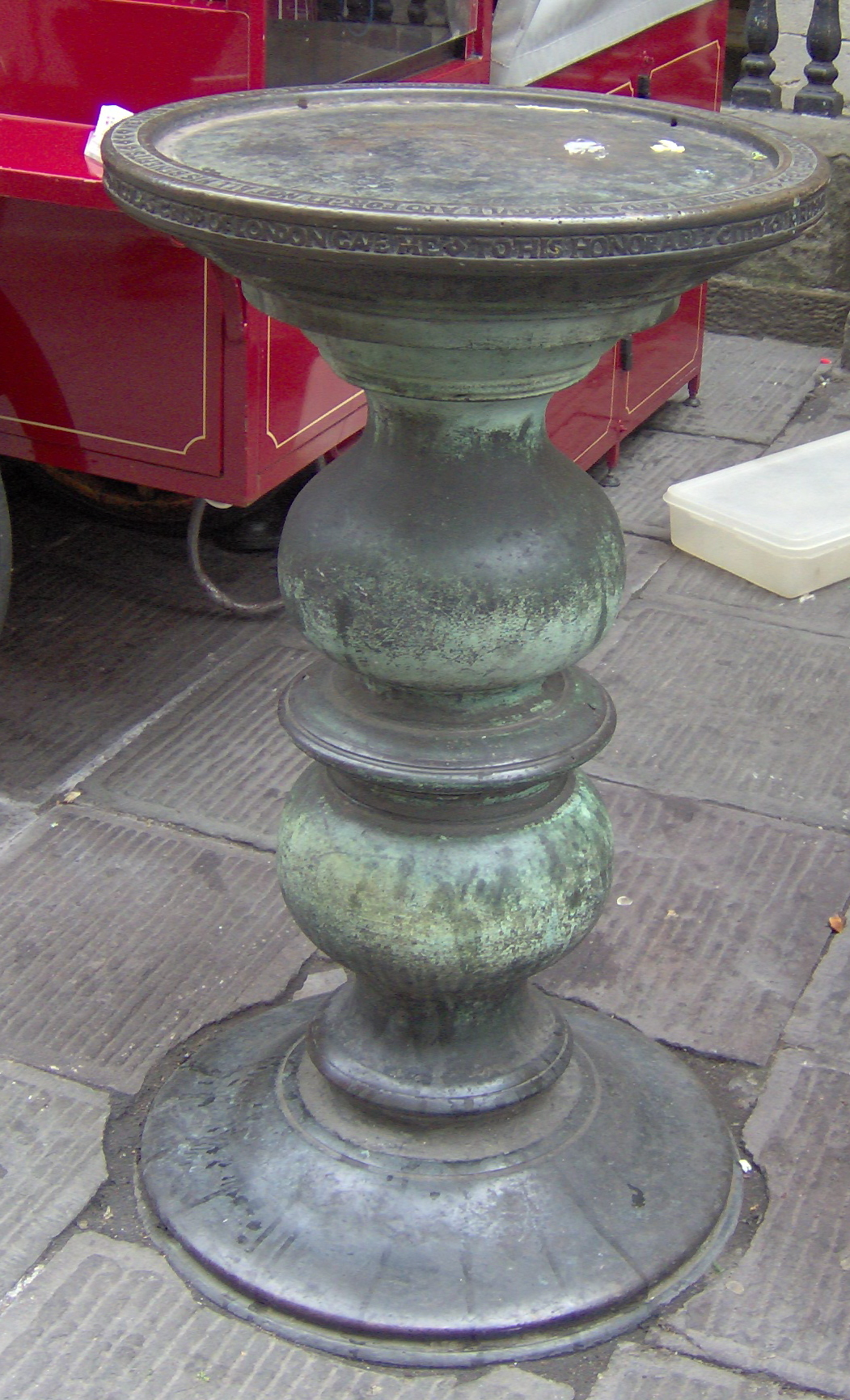
Bronze table called a "nail", outside The Exchange, Bristol

Four bronze tables are located outside The Exchange on Corn Street, probably modelled after mobile tables which were taken to trade fairs and markets. Before the Corn Exchange was built in the 18th century, the tables—called nails—were located in the Tolzey Walk. This covered area was along the south wall of All Saints Church, which remains as a narrow lane giving access to commercial premises.

The bronze nails, with their flat tops and raised edges which prevent coins from tumbling onto the pavement, were made as convenient tables at which merchants could carry out their business. The oldest pillar is undated, but experts say it is late Elizabethan. The second oldest was given by Bristol merchant Robert Kitchin, who died in 1594. The two remaining nails are dated 1625 and 1631.

The four nails were made at different times, and this is reflected in their varying designs. One of the nails bears the name John Barker on its rim. Barker was a wealthy merchant who owned houses and storehouses on the Quay, in Wine Street and in Small Street. He was mayor during the reign of Charles I and represented Bristol in the 1623 Parliament.

Deals could be closed by payment on the nails—the popularly supposed origin of the saying "pay on the nail" or "cash on the nail". However, this origin of the term is disputed.

== Clock ==
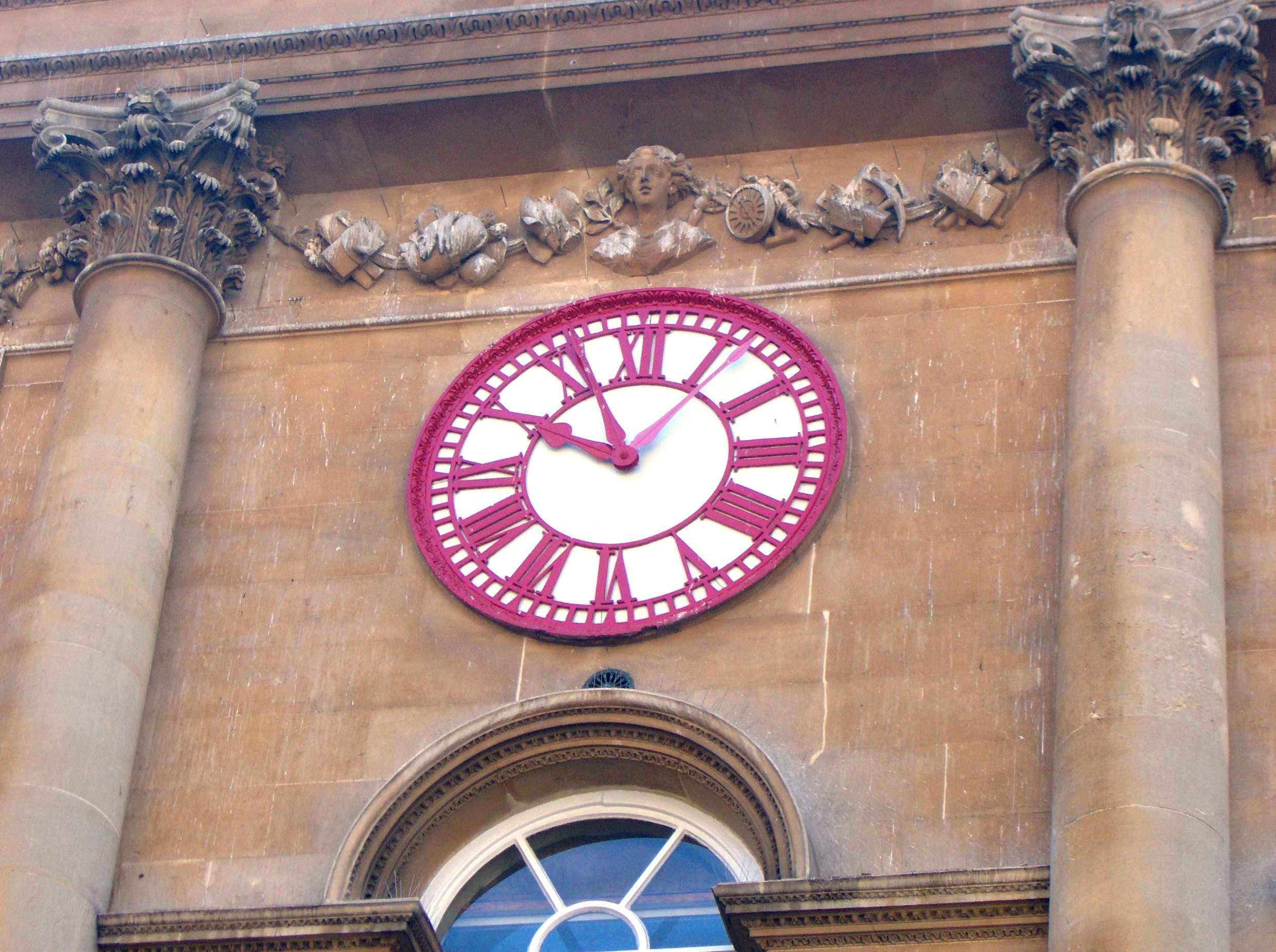
The clock on the Exchange showing the extra hand for "Bristol Time"

The clock was first installed in 1822. A second minute hand was later added to show the time in London as well as the local time in Bristol; the red minute hand shows Bristol time and the pink minute hand shows Greenwich Mean Time . This became necessary following the arrival of the railways, which required a standardised time for timetabling around the country, known as railway time; Bristol officially adopted railway time on 14 September 1852. The city is 2° 35' west of Greenwich, so when it is noon in Bristol by old local time, it is just after 12:10 p.m. in London by standard time.

== See also ==
- Corn exchanges in England
