= Time in Sri Lanka =

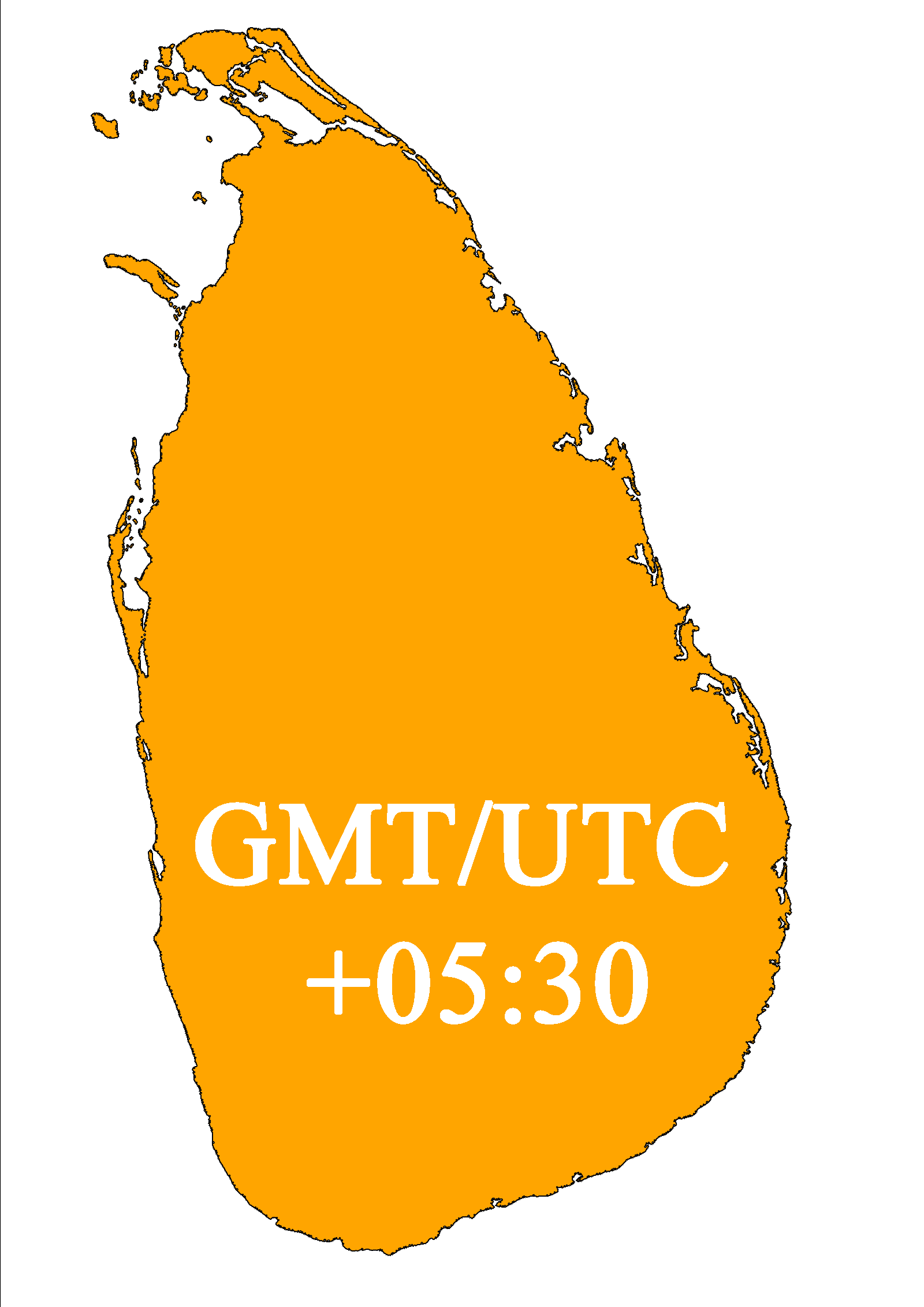
Sri lankan Standard Time SLST +05:30

Time in Sri Lanka since 15 April 2006 is officially represented by the Sri Lanka Standard Time (SLST, UTC+05:30).

Historic UTC offsets were:

- UTC+05:30
- UTC+06:00
- UTC+06:30

== Daylight saving time ==
In history daylight saving time was used too.

== IANA time zone database ==
The IANA time zone database contains one zone for Sri Lanka in the file zone.tab, named Asia/Colombo.

== See also ==
- Sri Lanka Standard Time
