= Railway time =

Time scale for rail transport

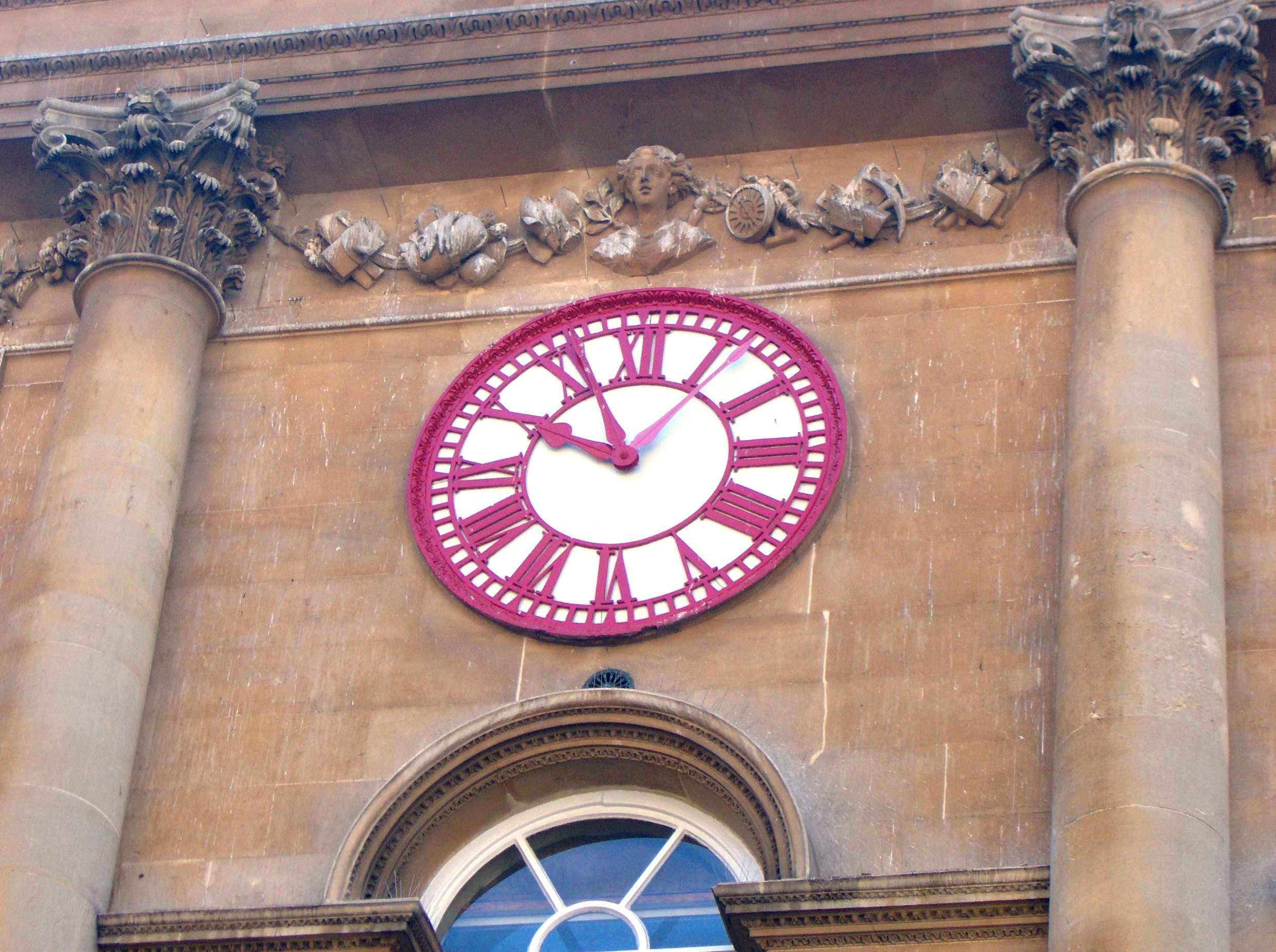
Clock on The Exchange, Bristol, showing two minute hands, one for London time (GMT) and one for Bristol time (GMT minus 11 minutes).

Railway time was the standardised time arrangement first applied by the Great Western Railway in England in November 1840, the first recorded occasion when different local mean times were synchronised and a single standard time applied. The key goals behind introducing railway time were to overcome the confusion caused by having non-uniform local times in each town and station stop along the expanding railway network and to reduce the incidence of accidents and near misses, which were becoming more frequent as the number of train journeys increased.

Railway time was progressively taken up by all railway companies in Great Britain over the following seven years. The schedules by which trains were organised and the time station clocks displayed were brought in line with the local mean time for London or "London Time", the time set at Greenwich by the Royal Observatory, which was already widely known as Greenwich Mean Time (GMT).

The development of railway networks in North America in the 1850s, India in around 1860, and in Europe, prompted the introduction of standard time influenced by geography, industrial development, and political governance.

The railway companies sometimes faced concerted resistance from local people who refused to adjust their public clocks to bring them into line with London Time. As a consequence, two different times would be displayed in the town and in use, with the station clocks and the times published in train timetables differing by several minutes from that on other clocks. Despite this early reluctance, railway time rapidly became adopted as the default time across the whole of Great Britain, although it took until 1880 for the government to legislate on the establishment of a single standard time and a single time zone for the country.

Some contemporary commentators referred to the influence of railway time on encouraging greater precision in daily tasks and the demand for punctuality.

== History ==
Until the latter part of the 18th century, time was normally determined in each town by a local sundial. Solar time is calculated with reference to the relative position of the sun. This provided only an approximation as to time due to variations in orbits and had become unsuitable for day-to-day purposes. It was replaced by local mean time, which eliminated the variation due to seasonal differences and anomalies. It also took account of the longitude of a location and enabled a precise time to be applied.

Such new-found precision did not overcome a different problem: the differences between the local times of neighbouring towns. In Britain, local time differed by up to twenty minutes from that of London. For example, Oxford Time was five minutes behind Greenwich Time, Leeds Time six minutes behind, Carnforth eleven minutes behind, and Barrow almost thirteen minutes behind. In India and North America, these differences could be sixty minutes or more. Almanacs containing tables were published and instructions attached to sundials to enable the differences between local times to be computed.

Before the arrival of the railways, journeys between the larger cities and towns could take many hours or days, and these differences could be dealt with by adjusting the hands of a watch periodically en route. In Britain, the coaching companies published schedules providing details of the corrections required. However, this variation in local times was large enough to present problems for the railway schedules. For instance, Leeds time was six minutes behind London, while Bristol was ten minutes behind; sunrise for towns to the east, such as Norwich, occurred several minutes ahead of London. It soon became apparent that even such small discrepancies in times caused confusion, disruption, or even accidents.

== Influence of the electric telegraph ==
The electric telegraph, which had been developed in the early part of the 19th century, was refined by William Fothergill Cooke and Charles Wheatstone and was installed on a short section of the Great Western Railway in 1839. By 1852 a telegraph link had been constructed between a new electro-magnetic clock at Greenwich and initially Lewisham, and shortly after this London Bridge stations. It also connected via the Central Telegraph Station of the Electric Time Company in the City of London, which enabled the transmission of a time signal along the railway telegraphic network to other stations. By 1855 time signals from Greenwich could be sent through wires alongside the railway lines across the length and breadth of Britain. This technology was also used in India to synchronise railway time.

== Introduction of railway time ==
=== Great Britain ===
Before the advent of the telegraph, stationmasters adjusted their clocks using tables supplied by the railway company to convert local time to London Time. In turn, train guards set their chronometers against those clocks.

The introduction of railway time was in the end swift despite not being straightforward. The Great Western Railway was the first to standardise its timetable on Greenwich Mean Time, in November 1840. One of the most vociferous proponents of standardising time on the railways was Henry Booth, Secretary of the Liverpool and Manchester Railway, who by January 1846 had ordered the adjustment of clocks to Greenwich Mean Time at both Liverpool and Manchester stations.

The Midland Railway adopted London Time at all of its stations on 1 January 1846. As a consequence, in February 1846 the town council of Nottingham ordered that the town clocks be furnished with three hands, two indicating local time and the additional one the railway and post-office London time.

On 22 September 1847, the Railway Clearing House, set up five years earlier to coordinate the distribution of revenue between railway companies, decreed that "GMT be adopted at all stations as soon as the General Post Office permitted it". From 1 December 1847, the London and North Western and the Caledonian Railways switched over.

One of the earliest changes by a major centre outside of London was Liverpool where the mayor and council ordered that from 1 December 1847 the principal public clocks in the city would be set to Greenwich Time.

By January 1848, according to Bradshaws Railway Guide, the railways that had adopted London Time included the London and South Western, the Midland, the Chester and Birkenhead, the Lancaster and Carlisle, the East Lancashire and the York and North Midland.

It was reported that by 1855 that 98 percent of towns and cities had transferred to GMT. On the other hand, not all railway companies convinced the local dignitaries to bring their clocks on public buildings in line without stern resistance. Although by 1844 the Bristol and Exeter Railway was running to London Time, the public clocks at both Exeter and Bristol operated to local time but showed London Time by a second minute hand, 14 and 10 minutes ahead, respectively, of its companion. In Exeter this situation arose due to the reluctance of the Dean of Exeter Cathedral to concede to the demands of the railway company, the cathedral clock being the principal timekeeper for the city. After a meeting of the city council with the cathedral authorities, Railway Time was adopted in Exeter on 2 November 1852. Similarly, the clock at The Bristol Exchange installed in 1822 subsequently had a second minute hand added. Bristol did not solely recognise railway time until September 1852. It was not for a further eight years and the arrival of the electric telegraph that railway time was the sole time recognised in these towns and others in the West Country, including Bath, Devonport and Plymouth. Another town that stood its ground was Oxford where the great clock on Tom Tower at Christ Church, Oxford had two minute hands. It was reported in the Western Times on 18 June 1859 that the opening of the Cornish railway brought the Cornish public into contact with Greenwich time, and the churchwarden of Camborne riled the magistracy by putting the town clock in harmony with railway time. Other Cornish towns adopted Greenwich time during 1860 with Liskeard on 11 January, Penzance on 26 March and Falmouth on 25 August.

It was not until 2 August 1880, when the Statutes (Definition of Time) Act 1880 received royal assent, that a unified standard time for the whole of Great Britain achieved legal status. As late as the 1950s, the Western Region of British Railways had an elaborate telephone ritual at 11:00 am for all signal boxes to synchronise their clocks with that at Paddington Station.

=== United States ===
One of the first reported incidents which brought about a change in how time was organised on railways in the United States occurred in New England in August 1853, the Valley Falls train collision. Two trains heading towards each other on the same track collided as the conductors had different times set on their watches, resulting in the death of 14 passengers. Railway schedules were co-ordinated in New England shortly after this incident. Numerous other collisions led to the setting up of the General Time Convention, a committee of railway companies to agree on scheduling.

In 1870 Charles F. Dowd, who was unconnected with the railway movement or civil authorities, proposed A System of National Times for Railroads, which involved a single time for railways but the keeping of local times for towns. Although this did not find favour with railway managers, in 1881 they agreed for the idea to be investigated by William Frederick Allen, Secretary of the General Time Convention and Managing Editor of the Travellers' Official Guide to the Railways. He proposed replacing the 50 different railway times with five time zones. He eventually persuaded the railway managers and the politicians running the cities that had several railway stations that it was in their interests to speedily adopt his simpler proposals, which aligned the zones with cities' railroad stations. In doing so they would pre-empt the imposition of more costly and cumbersome arrangements by different state legislators and the naval authorities, both of whom favoured retention of local times.

Right to the end there was opposition expressed by many smaller towns and cities to the imposition of railway time. For example, in Indianapolis the report in the daily Sentinel for 17 November 1883 protested that people would have to "eat sleep work ... and marry by railroad time". However, with the support of nearly all railway companies, most cities and influential observatories such as Yale and Harvard, this collaborative approach led to standard railway time being introduced at noon on 18 November 1883. This consensus held and was incorporated into federal law only in 1918.

=== France ===
France adopted Paris Mean Time as its standard national time in 1891. It also required clocks inside railway stations and train schedules to be set five minutes late to allow travelers to arrive late without missing their trains, even while clocks on the external walls of railway stations displayed Paris Mean Time. In 1911, France adopted Paris Mean Time delayed 9 minutes 21 seconds, making it equivalent to Greenwich Mean Time without mentioning Greenwich. At the same time, slow railway station clocks were eliminated.

=== Germany ===
In Germany the standardisation of time had started to be discussed in the 1870s. North German railways were already regulated to Berlin Time in 1874. However, it was not until 1 April 1893 that a law was established by the German Empire "concerning the introduction of uniform time reckoning" by which all railways would operate and also all aspects of social, industrial and civil activity would henceforth be strictly regulated.

=== Italy ===
Italy was newly unified as a country when on 12 December 1866 at the start of the winter season the railway timetables centred on Verona, Florence, Naples and Palermo were synchronised with the time in Rome (which would remain until 1870 under the Vatican State, but was chosen because of its position in the middle of the Italian peninsula). In addition to the adoption of a single railway time there was a progressive standardisation of time for civil and commercial purposes. Milan came in line straight away, Turin and Bologna on 1st January 1867, Venice on 1stMay 1880 and Cagliari in 1886.

=== Ireland ===
Ireland and France were the only countries that decided not to officially adopt Greenwich Time, reflecting the political sensitivities of the time. Dublin mean time was set 25 minutes behind London time, although it came into line with international standard time in October 1916 when summer time ended, and most railway clocks were adjusted by 35 minutes rather than one hour. A slight variation was in railway stations in Ulster such as Belfast and Bangor where clocks displayed on the same dial both Dublin mean time (railway time for the island of Ireland) and Belfast Time (local time), 23 minutes and 39 seconds behind Greenwich.

=== Netherlands ===
Netherlands Railway time was based on GMT until 1909 when the country adopted 'Amsterdam time' as the standard time, 19 minutes ahead of GMT. This persisted until 1940, when the Nazi occupation of the Netherlands required a shift to German time, which has continued to be the standard.

=== Sweden ===
Though several private railways had been built construction of public railways in Sweden came later than most other European countries, delayed by concerns over construction costs and resistance from powerful shipping owners. Railway time was introduced on the main railway line between Stockholm and Gothenburg which opened in 1862. Timetables were based on solar time at Gothenburg, the westernmost end of the line. As a consequence passengers and businesses following local time would arrive at the station ahead of the train. There were many private railways that followed local time or their own railway time. On 1 January 1879, a national standard time was introduced across the whole of Sweden, one hour advanced of Greenwich mean time.

=== Russia ===
Until 1 August 2018, Russia had a separate railway time, meaning that timetables and tickets on Russian railways followed Moscow Time regardless of local time. Starting from 1 August 2018, each station uses the local timezone.

=== India ===
The Indian railway companies had to contend with different local times as the rapidly expanding routes extended out from Mumbai (formerly Bombay), Kolkata (formerly Calcutta), Lahore and Chennai (formerly Madras). Towards the end of the 1860s the situation became even more confused as the networks linked up. In 1870, to overcome the problems occurring, Chennai (Madras) time was adopted for all railways, for two reasons: the longitude of Chennai is roughly midway between those of Kolkata and Mumbai, and the Observatory there ran the telegraphic service which could be utilised to synchronise station times via the same time-signal system first used in Britain in 1852 to regulate railway time. Madras Time was popularised by its use in Newman's Indian Bradshaw Timetables.

However, unlike in Britain, where railway time was rapidly adopted countrywide and evolved not long after into standard time, in India the much larger size of the country and the autonomy enjoyed by Mumbai and Kolkata resulted in both Presidencies' retaining local times well into the 20th century. For the remaining part of the 19th century Madras time continued to be used by all railways.

Proposals had been put forward for at least one meridian–based time zone for India as early as 1884. However, no consensus could be reached until 1906, when a single time zone based on Allahabad was established, and a standard time was introduced, which the railways came in line with. Despite this, Kolkata kept its own time until 1948 and to a lesser extent Mumbai continued to unofficially until 1955.

=== Korea ===
In 1904, during the Russo-Japanese War the Chosen Keifu Railway, a privately run company, introduced Japan Central Standard Time as its railway time instead of Korean traditional time (UTC+08:28). In 1908, Chosen Keibu Railway adopted new Korean standard time (UTC+08:30).
