= UTC+05:30 =

Time zone

- Time zone
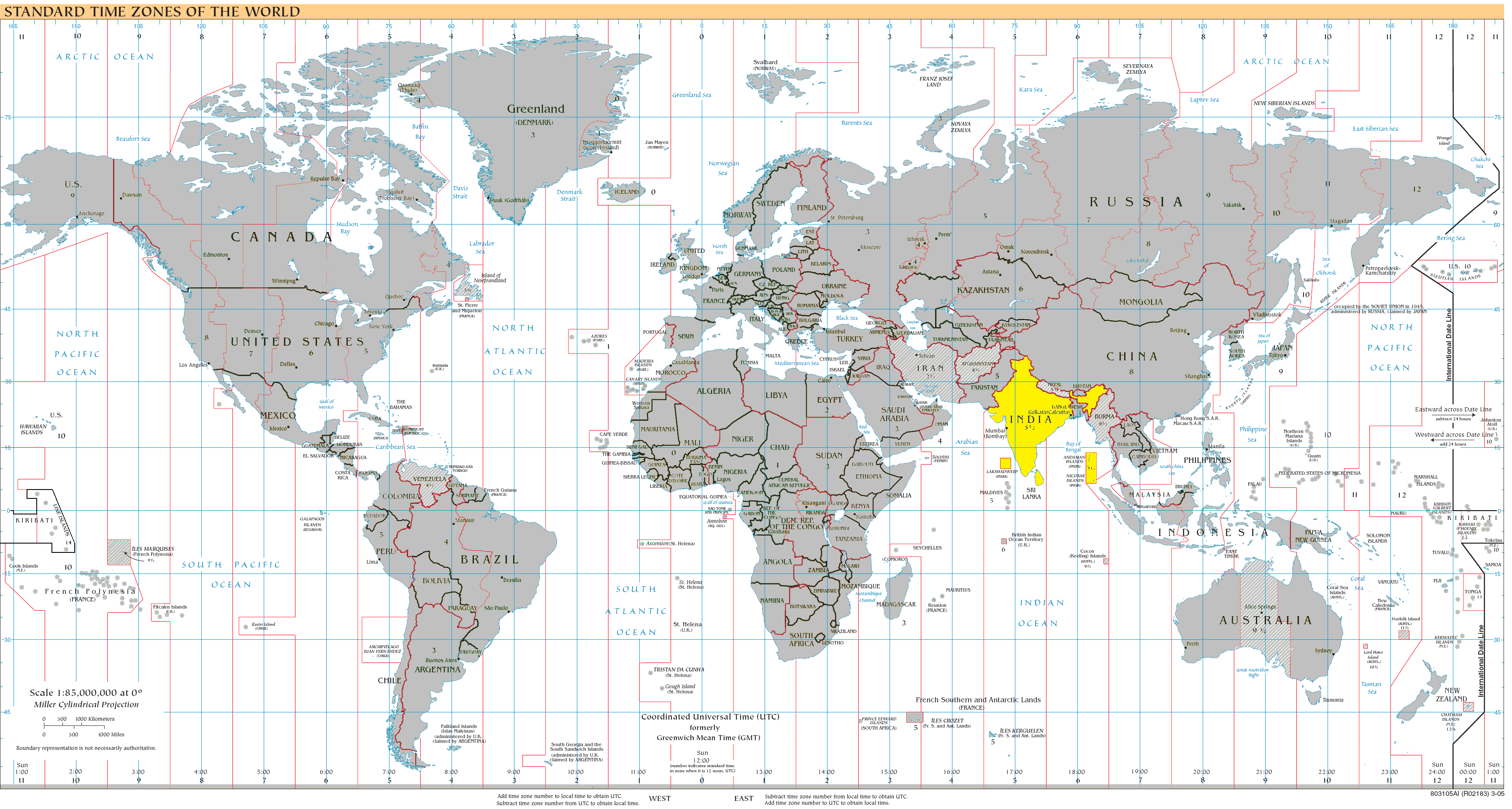
- World map with the time zone highlighted

UTC offset
- UTC: UTC+05:30

Current time
- 01:21, 26 September 2026 UTC+05:30 [refresh]

Central meridian
- 82.5 degrees E

Date-time group
- E*

UTC+5:30 is an identifier for a time offset of 5 hours and 30 minutes ahead of Coordinated Universal Time. Indian Standard Time, used in India, and Sri Lanka Standard Time, used in Sri Lanka, are based on this offset. It has the second-largest population among time zones, after UTC+08:00.

Nepal Standard Time used this offset until 1986, when it switched to UTC+5:45.

== As Standard Time (year-round) ==
=== South Asia ===
Principal Cities: Mumbai, Delhi, Kolkata, Chennai, Bengaluru, Hyderabad, Ahmedabad, Colombo

- India – Indian Standard Time (IST)
- Sri Lanka – Sri Lanka Standard Time (SLST)

== See also ==
- Time in India
- Time in Sri Lanka
