= Newfoundland Station =

- Active: 1729–1825
- Country: United Kingdom
- Branch: Royal Navy
- Type: Naval formation
- Part of: Royal Navy
- Garrison/HQ: Plymouth, Portsmouth, St. John's.

The Newfoundland Station was a formation or command of, first, the Kingdom of Great Britain and, then, of the United Kingdom's Royal Navy. Its official headquarters varied between Portsmouth or Plymouth in England where a squadron of ships would set sail annually each year to protect convoys and the British fishing fleet operating in waters off the Newfoundland coast and would remain for period of approximately six months based at St. John's Harbour. In 1818 the station became a permanent posting headquartered at St John's. It existed from 1729 to 1825.

== History ==
The Commodore-Governor was both a British Government and a Royal Navy official who was commander-in-chief of the annual fishing convoy which left England each spring, sometimes from Portsmouth and other times from Plymouth, to fish off Newfoundland: the fleet were tasked with protecting the fishing convoys from harm. They were also responsible for administrative and judicial functions, including assisting the fishing admirals in Britain in maintaining admiralty law and order and compiling the annual report on the fish stocks for the British government. From 1729 to 1775 the officer appointed was usually of Commodore rank; however the station's increasing importance after that date led to appointments of more senior flag officers.

The squadron stayed in Newfoundland for approximately four to six months annually. How long they remained depended on the orders they received from the Admiralty, according to the ships' condition. The fleet usually arrived off Newfoundland in July and August, generally returning to England, via the Lisbon Station, towards the end of October. Bypassing the horrendous weather conditions prevalent in the Atlantic at that time of year and escorting the British fishing vessels were important considerations in when the squadron returned. In spite of these problems, the naval administration continued to grow throughout the 18th century. By 1818, the Newfoundland Colony had a sufficiently large permanent population to warrant having a full-time resident governor. The station's responsibilities were merged into the North America Station in 1825 when a full-time civilian governor was appointed.

== Commanders ==
List of Commanders in Chief, Newfoundland Station
Rank	Name	From	Until	Notes	Ref.
Commodore	Henry Osborn	1729	1730		
Commodore	George Clinton	1731	1731		
Commodore	Edward Falkingham	1732	1732		
Commodore	Robert Muskerry	1733	1734		
Commodore	FitzRoy Henry Lee	1735	1737		
Commodore	Philip Vanbrugh	1738	1738		
Commodore	Henry Medley	1739	1740		
Commodore	Thomas Smith	1741	1741		
Commodore	John Byng	1742	1742		
Commodore	Thomas Smith	1743	1743		
Commodore	Charles Hardy	1744	1744		
Commodore	Richard Edwards	1745	1745		
Commodore	Sir James Douglas	1746	1746		
Commodore	Charles Watson	1748	1748		
Commodore	George Rodney	1749	1749		
Commodore	Francis William Drake	1750	1752		
Commodore	Hugh Bonfoy	1753	1754		
Commodore	Richard Dorrill	1755	1756		
Commodore	Richard Edwards	1757	1759		
Commodore	James Webb	1760	1761	Died in post	
Commodore	Thomas Graves	1761	1763		
Commodore	Hugh Palliser	1764	1768		
Commodore	John Byron	1769	1771		
Commodore	Molyneux Shuldham	1772	1774		
Commodore	Robert Duff	1775	1775		
Vice-Admiral	John Montagu	1776	1778	Titled Governor and Commander-in-Chief of Newfoundland	
Rear-Admiral	Richard Edwards	1779	1781		
Vice-Admiral	John Campbell	1782	1786		
Rear-Admiral	John Elliot	1786	1788		
Vice-Admiral	Mark Milbanke	1789	1791		
Rear-Admiral	Sir Richard King	1792	1793		
Rear-Admiral	Sir James Wallace	1794	1796		
Vice-Admiral	William Waldegrave	1797	1799		
Rear-Admiral	Charles Pole	1800	1801		
Vice-Admiral	James Gambier	1802	1803		
Vice-Admiral	Sir Erasmus Gower	1804	1806		
Vice-Admiral	John Holloway	1807	1809		
Admiral	Sir John Duckworth	1810	1812		
Vice-Admiral	Sir Richard Keats	1813	1816		
Vice-Admiral	Francis Pickmore	1817	1818	Died in post	
Captain	John Bowker	1818	1818	Temporary	
Vice-Admiral	Sir Charles Hamilton	1818	1825		

== See also ==
- Fishing admiral
