= Scottish colonization of the Americas =

The Scottish colonization of the Americas comprised a number of Scottish colonial settlements in the Americas during the early modern period. These included the colony of Nova Scotia in 1629, East Jersey in 1683, Stuarts Town, Carolina in 1684 and New Caledonia in 1698.

== Nova Scotia (1621) ==
The first documented Scottish settlement in the Americas was of Nova Scotia in 1629. On 29 September 1621, the charter for the foundation of a colony was granted by James VI of Scotland to Sir William Alexander. Between 1622 and 1628, Sir William launched four attempts to send colonists to Nova Scotia; all failed for various reasons. A successful settlement of Nova Scotia was finally achieved in 1629. The colony's charter, in law, made Nova Scotia (defined as all land between Newfoundland and New England; i.e., The Maritimes) a part of mainland Scotland; this was later used to get around the English navigation acts.

Due to difficulties in obtaining a sufficient number of skilled emigrants, in 1624, James VI created a new order of baronets; admission to this order was obtained by sending six labourers or artisans, sufficiently armed, dressed and supplied for two years, to Nova Scotia, or by paying 3,000 merks to William Alexander. For six months, no one took up this offer until James compelled one man to make the first move. In 1627, there was a wider uptake of baronetcies, and thus more settlers available to go to Nova Scotia.

During the Anglo-French War, David Kirke took Quebec City in 1629, and Sir James Stewart of Killeith, Lord Ochiltree planted a colony on Cape Breton Island, Nova Scotia at Baleine, and Alexander's son, William Alexander, 1st Earl of Stirling established the first incarnation of "New Scotland" at Port Royal, Nova Scotia. This set of British triumphs which left Cape Sable as the only major French holding on mainland Nova Scotia was not destined to last. Charles I of England's haste to make peace with France on the terms most beneficial to him meant that the new North American gains would be bargained away in the Treaty of Suza and the Treaty of Saint-Germain-en-Laye. The Scots were forced to abandon their Nova Scotia colony in its infancy. The French under Isaac de Razilly reoccupied Nova Scotia (Acadia) in 1632, establishing their new capital at LaHave. Upon Razilly's death, his lieutenant Charles de Menou d'Aulnay moved the capital to the old Scottish settlement of Charles Fort and reasserted it as Port Royal.

During this time when Nova Scotia briefly became a Scottish colony, there were three battles between the Scots and the French: one at Saint John; another at Cape Sable Island; and the other at Baleine, Nova Scotia.

=== Cape Breton (1625) and (1629) ===
In 1625 a charter was given by James VI for a settlement at Cape Breton Island, New Galloway. However, this land was never colonized likely due to the problems over the settlement of Nova Scotia. In 1629 James Stewart, 4th Lord Ochiltree attempted to found a settlement called "Rosemar" but was captured by French soldiers and taken to France.

== East New Jersey (1683) ==
On 23 November 1683, Charles II granted a charter for the colony of New Jersey to 24 proprietors, 12 of whom were Scots. The colony was to be split between an English settlement in West Jersey and a Scottish settlement in East Jersey. The driving force among the Scots was Robert Barclay of Urie, a prominent Quaker and the first Governor of East Jersey.

Although the Quakers were an important force, making up all of the proprietors of East Jersey, the settlement was marketed as a national, rather than religious, endeavour partially because of persecution of the Quakers in the 1660s and the 1670s.

Scots began arriving in East Jersey in 1683 at Perth Amboy and spread south to Monmouth County. The city became the provincial capital in 1686. During the 1680s, around 700 Scots emigrated to East Jersey, mostly from Aberdeen and Montrose, and around 50% of those travelled as indentured servants. From 1685, there was further emigration, albeit unsought by the emigrants, with the deportation of captured Covenanters. They were originally to have been placed in indentured servitude on arrival; however, they were declared by the courts to be free men, as they had not voluntarily indented. In the 1690s, the pace of Scottish immigration slowed by the opposition by William III of England and II of Scotland to those proprietors who supported James II of England and VII of Scotland and did not pick up again until the 1720s.

The initial immigrants to East Jersey were Quakers, Episcopalians and Presbyterians; by the 1730s, Presbyterianism had become the dominant religion.

Until 1697, every Governor of East Jersey was Scottish, who maintained great influence in politics and business even after 1702, when East Jersey and West Jersey were merged to become a Royal Colony.

== Stuarts Town, Carolina (1684) ==
Although the Province of Carolina was an English colony in the early 1680s, Sir John Cochrane of Ochiltree and Sir George Campbell of Cessnock negotiated the purchase of two counties for Scottish settlement. These were intended, with the support of the Earl of Shaftesbury, the leader of the Carolina Proprietors, to provide a haven for Covenanters, as they negotiated a guarantee of freedom of conscience and autonomous control of their colony, which extended from Charles Town towards Spanish territory.

Investors were encouraged that the colony might have its own government and "wee might haive Presbytery estaiblished". Robert Baird, an Edinburgh merchant, was the company's cash-keeper in 1682. Plans were interrupted by the aftermath of the Rye House Plot. In 1684, 148 settlers arrived from Gourock to build a settlement at Port Royal, the site of former French and Spanish settlements. This was renamed by as Stuarts Town.

William Dunlop recommended the purchase of slaves from Barbados and sold runaway slaves to the Spanish. The Scots made an alliance with the Yamasee people. Once settled, there was frequent conflict, both with Spanish-allied Indigenous or American Indians and with the English at Charles Town. Historic Stuarts Town was destroyed in a battle with Spaniards from St. Augustine in August 1686.

== Darien scheme (1695) ==
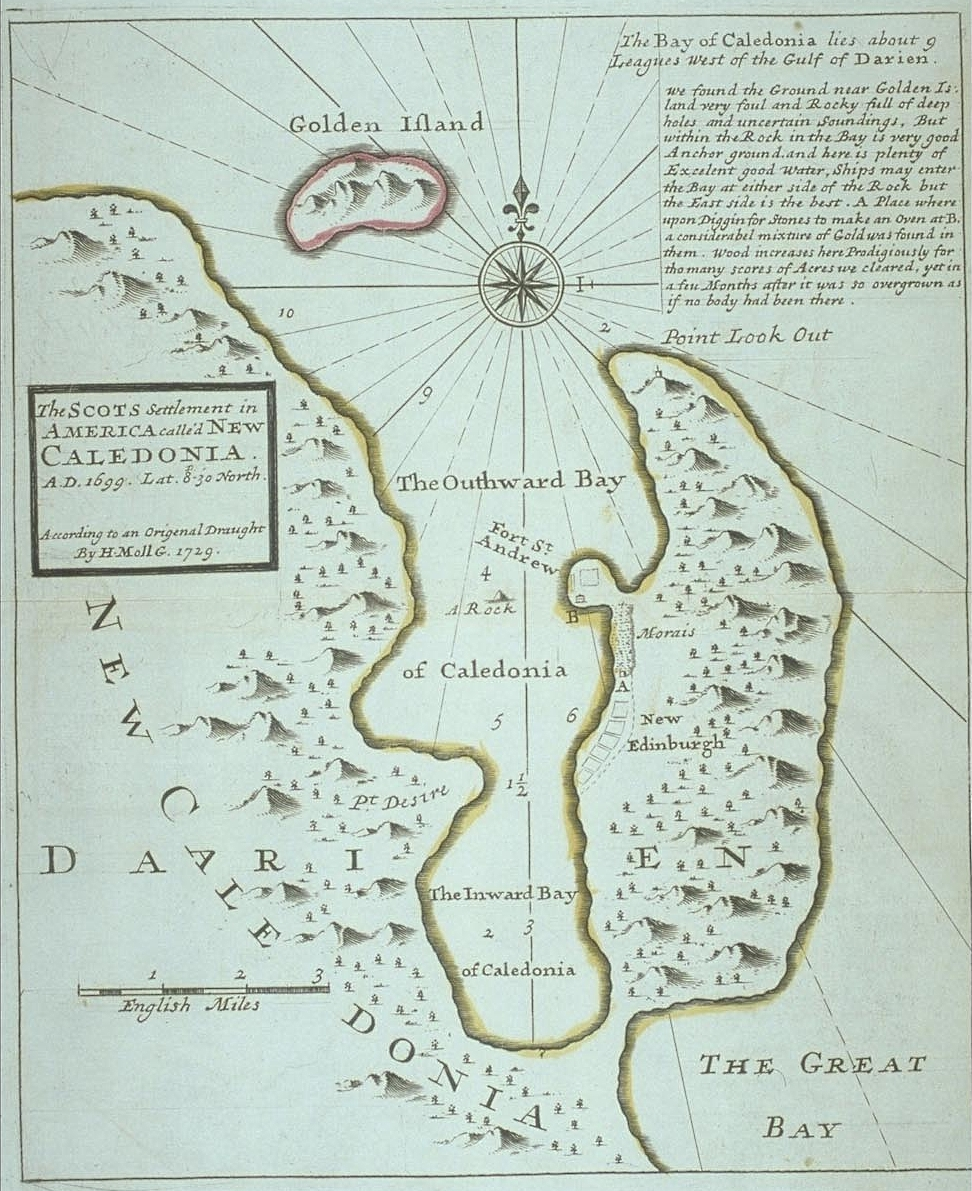
Map of the Scottish settlement on the isthmus of Panama as it was in 1699

The Darien scheme is probably the best known of all Scotland's colonial endeavours, and the most disastrous. In 1695, an act was passed in the Parliament of Scotland establishing The Company of Scotland Trading to Africa and the Indies and was given royal assent by the Scottish representative of King William II of Scotland (and III of England). This act gave the company a 31-year monopoly on trade with Africa and Asia, authorising it to arm and equip ships and to establish colonies in uninhabited or unclaimed areas of America, Asia or Africa. These powers were similar to those of the English East India Company, which opposed the establishment of a Scottish rival.

Capital for the company of £400,000 (estimated at one-quarter to one-third of the liquid wealth of Scotland) was raised solely in Scotland, due to intrigue by English merchants and the English government which prevented shares being sold in Amsterdam and Hamburg. This opposition also prevented shares being sold in England, as was the original intention.

In 1696, 2,500 Scottish settlers, in two expeditions, set out to found a Scottish trading colony in the Darién Gap on the isthmus of Panama. These settlers were made up of ex-soldiers, ministers of religion, merchants, sailors and the younger sons of the gentry, to receive 50 to 150 acres (0.61 km^{2}) each. The government of the colony was run by a committee, the chairman of which changed every two weeks.

The problems faced by the settlers included a lack of provisions due to famine in Scotland, the Scots' lack of colonising experience, diseases such as malaria, poor weather and the proximity of the Spanish, who claimed the land the Scots had settled on. Also, for a trading colony established to trade with passing ships in both the Pacific and Atlantic Oceans, they carried a poor choice of trade goods, including wigs, shoes, bibles, woolen clothing and clay pipes.

The colony received no assistance from the crown or English colonies in the West Indies or Jamaica, despite having been promised, in the 1695 act, the assistance of William II. Thus, the Scots faced assaults by the Spanish on their own. In 1699, they dealt with this by recruiting a Jamaican captain to raid Spanish shipping as a privateer, but this achieved little. Soon thereafter, the Spanish mounted an expedition of 500 men to wipe out the Scots. This was effective, as most settlers had already succumbed to disease or starvation.

The company also took control of Crab Island in 1698 (modern day Vieques, Puerto Rico), yet sovereignty was short-lived.

== Darien, Georgia (1735) ==
Darien, Georgia, was a settlement created by Englishman James Oglethorpe and his aide Scotsman Captain George Dunbar who brought in 177 Scots settlers to the Province of Georgia. It was named after the previous failed settlement on the Isthmus of Panama, though it was, for a time, also known as "New Inverness".

== See also ==
- Darien scheme
- Darien, Georgia
- Nova Scotia
- East Jersey
- Scottish Tobacco trade
- Scottish Indian trade
- Lowland Clearances
- Highland Clearances
- Former colonies and territories in Canada
- English colonial empire

=== Modern diaspora ===
- Scottish Americans
- Scottish Argentine
- Scottish Australians
- Scottish Brazilians
- Scottish New Zealanders
- Scottish Canadians
  - Canadian Gaelic
- Scottish Chilean
- Scottish Jamaicans
- Origins of Falkland Islanders
