= Scatarie Island =

Island in Nova Scotia, Canada

Coordinates: 46°1′0″N 59°45′0″W

Scatarie Island in Nova Scotia

Scatarie Island is an island in the Canadian province of Nova Scotia, located off the coast of Baleine, Cape Breton Island.

== History ==
During the Anglo-French War (1627–29), under Charles I, by 1629 the Kirkes took Quebec City, Sir James Stewart of Killeith, Lord Ochiltree planted a colony on Cape Breton Island at Baleine, and Alexander’s son, William Alexander, 1st Earl of Stirling established the first incarnation of “New Scotland” at Port Royal, Nova Scotia. This set of British triumphs which left only Cape Sable (present-day Port La Tour, Nova Scotia and area) as the only major French holding in North America was not destined to last. Charles I’s haste to make peace with France on the terms most beneficial to him meant that the new North American gains would be bargained away in the Treaty of Saint-Germain-en-Laye (1632).

Ochiltree arrived with 60 Brownists and built Fort Rosemar. It was a military colony, one that owed its origins to the exigencies of war, not a permanent agricultural settlement. Ochiltree's primary objective was to erect a military post to assert Charles 1 claims, and by extension the rights of the Merchant Adventures to Canada, in a crucial theatre that linked the St. Lawrence with Nova Scotia. Ochiltree's party carried a hefty supply of guns, ammunition, and heavy artillery. One of the first acts was to attack and capture a sixty-ton Portuguese barque that they found at anchor near the site of their proposed settlement. The ship was dismantled and stripped of its cannon, which were then used as additional artillery to guard Fort Rosemar. Ochiltree proceeded to capture French fishing vessels off the shores of Cape Breton.

During this time when Nova Scotia briefly became a Scottish colony, there were three battles between the Scots and the French: one at Saint John; another at Cape Sable Island; and the other at Baleine.

=== Siege of Baleine ===
Charles Daniel arrived with 53 men and numerous friendly natives. He captured two shallops manned by fishermen from Rosemar, and imprisoned them. On September 10, he approached the fort and assured the British he was coming in peace. The French then attacked by bombarding the fort with cannon fire from the ships, and Daniel conducting a land assault. Daniel was a harsh captor. He ordered Ochiltree and his company to demolish their fort and forced the prisoners to Grand Cibou (present-day Englishtown, Nova Scotia). There Daniel had Ochiltree and his men construct a new fort Fort Sainte Anne (Nova Scotia). Then he sailed the prisoners to France, where Ochiltree was thrown in jail for a month.

=== Naval blockade ===
During the French and Indian War, in the buildup to the Siege of Louisbourg (1758), the British ran a naval blockade of Louisbourg off the coast of Baleine and Scatarie Island. Similarly the French were capturing British ships. Between August 1756 and October 1757, the French captured 39 British ships. The British pursued two French ships off of Scatarie Island: the Arc-en-Ciel (52 guns) and the frigate Concorde. The two ships had crossed the Atlantic together but got separated at the Grand Banks during a storm. The most significant single prize the British captured in 1756 was the Arc-en-Ciel. The ship was captured on 12 June off Scatarie after a long chase and a five-hour gun battle. The warship had on board sixty thousand livres in specie and as many as 200 recruits. The British kept the Arc-en-Ciel in Atlantic waters for the next few years, sailing out of Halifax. It would form part of the fleet the British put together to attack Louisbourg in 1758.

At the same time, the Concorde initially eluded the Royal Navy on two occasions. The ship had 50 passengers made up of troops and stonemasons and 30 thousand livres in coin. On June 10 the Concorde slipped into the protected bay on Scatarie Island. When it sailed out, the pursuit began anew. The Concorde headed for Port Dauphin (Englishtown) but eventually unloaded everyone and the money on board to a schooner who could safely make it to Louisbourg.

== Recent events ==
On September 20, 2011, the 222 m Great Lakes freighter MV Miner ran aground on the shoals on the north side of the island. As of October 12, the majority of the fluids on the ship have been drained, but the wreck has developed a large hole and it is unlikely the ship will be able to be re-floated. Costs of the potential salvage job to remove the wreck have been quoted at approximately $24 million.

== Environment ==
The island is now an Important Bird Area and a Protected Area.
