= Abigail (ship) =

English merchantman (1615–39)

Abigail was an armed merchantman in the 17th century. Initially a privately-owned ship, Abigail had a brief spell in the Venetian navy, and was later requestioned by English Royal Navy. Following two short spells with the navy, Abigail was used by privateer David Kirke in his voyages to French Canada. She was lost in a cyclone off of the coast of Saint Kitts in 1639.

== Construction ==
Abigail was constructed in c. 1615 at an unknown dockyard on the River Thames, initially as a merchantman in private ownership.

== Career ==
Abigail made her maiden voyage in 1616, returning to her home port of London on 24 December 1616.

=== Venetian service ===
In February 1618, a deal was agreed for Abigail to be hired by the Venetian navy, which came into effect on 18 March. Abigail departed London as part of a squadron of seven hired vessels on 8 April, arriving at the Venetian stronghold of Corfu nine or ten weeks later. Abigail's contract was extended until August 1619, at which time she returned to England.

=== Virginia Company ===
In 1620 the Virginia Company charted Abigail to carry colonists and goods to Virginia. Abigail's captain, Each, proposed a more ambitious venture that would see Abigail proceed from the colony to Blunts Point, where the crew would build a blockhouse to provide the colony with strategic control over access to the James River. Abigail finally set sail in 1622; the crossing was beset by problems including overcrowding, disease, and the discovery that the ship's beer supplies were contaminated. Abigail arrived in Virginia in January 1623, and shortly after, Captain Each died. With no designated successor for Each, the plans for the blockhouse were soon abandoned, and Abigail sent home. Upon her arrival back in London, Abigail's owners became embroiled in a dispute with the Virginia Company. The scandal likely damaged the ship's reputation.

=== Military service ===
In June 1625, Abigail was requisitioned by the Royal Navy, and sailed with the fleet that brought Henrietta Maria from France. In 1626 she was again requisitioned by the Royal Navy, as part of a squadron of requisitioned merchant ships that was dismissed before setting to sea.

=== Privateering ===
During the Anglo-French War of 1627–1629, Abigail was one of a number of ships acquired for a privateering company in the ownership of Sir William Alexander and Gervase Kirke. Letters of marque were issued on 17 December 1627. Abigail herself was commanded by David Kirke, and took part in a series of raids throughout the Gulf of St Lawrence in 1628, seizing control of all the French settlements in the area except Quebec, and participating in the action of 17 July 1628. Kirke would return the following year and capture Quebec, almost certainly still in Abigail.

=== Later career ===
Following the end of the war, Abigail returned to merchant service, and in the early 1630s traded with Mediterranean ports including Malaga and Zante.

In mid-July 1635 Abigail sailed from London for New England, arriving safely in Massachusetts Bay.

Abigail departed on her final voyage in c. March 1639, destined for the Caribbean. Following a troubled voyage in which a number of crew members died, Abigail anchored off of Saint Kitts. There, she struggled to sell her goods, and so she was still at anchor when a hurricane struck. Abigail was lost with an almost complete loss of lives among the crew.
