= Port La Tour =

- Community
- Location of Port La Tour, Nova Scotia
- Coordinates: 43.497222°N 65.474722°W
- Country: Canada
- Province: Nova Scotia
- County: Shelburne
- Municipal district: Barrington
- Time zone: UTC-4 (AST)
  - Summer (DST): UTC-3 (ADT)
- Postal code(s): B0W 1E0
- Area code: 902

Port La Tour is a community in the Canadian province of Nova Scotia, located in the Municipality of the District of Barrington of Shelburne County.

The Historic Sites and Monuments Board of Canada asserts that Fort Saint Louis is located at Port La Tour, although this has been disputed. It has also been claimed that the fort at Port La Tour was Fort Lomeron (also known as Fort La Tour) and that Fort St. Louis was located at the neighbouring community of Villagedale, Nova Scotia.

== French Colony ==
Cape Sable and Eel Bay, Nova Scotia were first settled by the Acadians who migrated from Port Royal in 1620. The French governor of Acadia, Charles de la Tour, colonized Cap de Sable giving it the present name, meaning Sandy Cape. La Tour built up a strong post at Cap de Sable (present-day Port La Tour, Nova Scotia) beginning in 1623, called Fort Lomeron in honour of David Lomeron who was his agent in France. (The fur trading post called Fort Lomeron was later renamed Fort La Tour although – erroneously – identified as Fort Saint-Louis in the writings of Samuel de Champlain.) Here he carried on a sizable trade in furs with the Mi'kmaq and farmed the land.

During the Anglo-French War (1627–1629), under Charles I, by 1629 the Kirkes took Quebec City, Sir James Stewart of Killeith, Lord Ochiltree planted a colony on Cape Breton Island at Baleine, and Alexander's son, William Alexander, 1st Earl of Stirling established the first incarnation of "New Scotland" at Port Royal, Nova Scotia. This set of British triumphs in what had otherwise been a disastrous war was not destined to last. King Charles' haste to make peace with France on the terms most beneficial to him meant that the new North American gains would be bargained away in the Treaty of Saint-Germain-en-Laye (1632). There were three battles in Nova Scotia during the colonization of Scots: one at Saint John; another battle at Balene, Cape Breton; and one on Cape Sable (Port La Tour).

=== Siege of 1630 ===
In 1627, as a result of these Scottish victories, Cape Sable was the only major French holding in North America. There was a battle between Charles and his father at Fort St. Louis (See National Historic Site - Fort St. Louis), the latter supporting the Scottish who had taken Port Royal, Nova Scotia. The battle lasted two days. Claude was forced to withdraw in humiliation to Port Royal.

As a result, La Tour appealed to the King of France for assistance and was appointed lieutenant-general in Acadia in 1631.

By 1641, La Tour lost Cape Sable Island, Pentagouet (Castine, Maine), and Port Royal, Nova Scotia to Governor of Acadia Charles de Menou d'Aulnay de Charnisay.

La Tour retired to Cap de Sable with his third wife Jeanne Motin, wed in 1653, and died in 1666.

Port La Tour was the site of the first recorded conflict between New England and the Mi'kmaq (see Battle off Port La Tour (1677)).

=== Father Le Loutre's War ===
During Father Le Loutre's War there were various naval battles just off shore as the French vessels carried war munitions and supplies from Quebec to the Saint John River for Boishebert at Fort Menagoueche.

=== French and Indian War ===
The British Conquest of Acadia happened in 1710. Over the next forty-five years the Acadians refused to sign an unconditional oath of allegiance to Britain. During this time period Acadians participated in various militia operations against the British and maintained vital supply lines to the French Fortress of Louisbourg and Fort Beausejour. The Acadians and Mi'kmaq from Cape Sable Island raided the Protestants at Lunenburg, Nova Scotia numerous times.

During the French and Indian War, the British sought to neutralize any military threat Acadians posed and to interrupt the vital supply lines Acadians provided to Louisbourg by deporting Acadians from Acadia. In April 1756, Major Preble and his New England troops, on their return to Boston, raided a settlement near Port La Tour and captured 72 men, women, and children.

In the late summer of 1758, the British launched three large offensives against the Acadians. One was the St. John River Campaign, another was the Petitcodiac River Campaign, and the other was against the Acadians at Cape Sable Island. Major Henry Fletcher led the 35th regiment and a company of Joseph Gorham's Rangers to Cape Sable Island. He cordoned off the cape and sent his men through it. One hundred Acadians and Father Jean Baptiste de Gray surrendered, while about 130 Acadians and seven Mi'kmaq escaped. The Acadian prisoners were taken to Georges Island in Halifax Harbour.

En route to the St. John River Campaign in September 1758, Moncton sent Major Roger Morris, in command of two men-of-war and transport ships with 325 soldiers, to deport more Acadians. On October 28, his troops sent the women and children to Georges Island. The men were kept behind and forced to work with troops to destroy their village. On October 31, they were also sent to Halifax. In the spring of 1759, Joseph Gorham and his rangers arrived to take prisoner the remaining 151 Acadians. They reached Georges Island with them on June 29.

== See also ==
- List of communities in Nova Scotia
