= Abigail (disambiguation) =

Abigail was the wife of King David.

Abigail may also refer to:

== People ==
- Abigail (name), a feminine given name and a surname
- Abigail (actress) (born 1948), English-born Australian actress

== Arts and entertainment ==
- Abigail (novel), 1979, by Magda Szabó
- Abigail (band), a Japanese black metal band
- Abigail (album), a 1987 King Diamond album
- "Abigail", a song by Motionless in White
- Abigail (TV series) (1988–1989), a Venezuelan telenovela
- Abigail (2019 film), a Russian fantasy adventure film
- Abigail (2023 film), an American horror thriller film
- Abigail (2024 film), an American horror film

== Other uses ==
- Cyclone Abigail, various tropical cyclones
- HMS Abigail, various Royal Navy ships

== See also ==
- Avigayil, an Israeli settlement
- Abgal (disambiguation)
