= Olivier Le Jeune =

Madagascar-born enslaved Afro-Canadian

- Born: c. 1621; Madagascar
- Died: 1654 (aged 32–33); Quebec City
- Occupation: slave
- Known for: First slave in St Lawrence Valley/Québec/Canada

Olivier Le Jeune (died May 10, 1654) was an Afro-Canadian man noted as the first recorded slave in New France.

== Background ==
Olivier was born in Madagascar.

He is believed to have been approximately seven years of age when he was brought to the French colonial settlement of Quebec in New France by English privateer David Kirke or one of his brothers, Lewis and Thomas Kirke, during their capture of the settlement. He was the first slave recorded in New France. Olivier Le Jeune was sold to Olivier Le Baillif, a French clerk who had gone over to the British, for the sum of 50 écus/150 livres (six months of a skilled person's wage).

When Quebec was handed back to the French in 1632, Le Baillif left the colony and gave his slave to a Quebec resident, Guillaume Couillard. The boy was educated in a school established by the Jesuit priest Paul Le Jeune, who taught him to read and write. On teaching Olivier, Paul Le Jeune said that "[a]fter so many years of regency, [he] have finally [came] back to teaching ABCs, but with such contentment and satisfaction that [he] wouldn't give up [Olivier and another Native American pupil] for even the most prestigious audience in France".

In 1632, Paul Le Jeune observed that Olivier did not fully grasp conversation very well, and his baptism would thus have to wait. On his owner's wife asking him if he wanted to become Christian like them, Olivier answered positively, but was afraid he would be flayed (as Native Americans had been), as he would have to be flayed to become white like them. They laughed, and Olivier realized he had been mistaken. Paul Le Jeune baptised him with the name Olivier in 1633, after the colony's head clerk, Olivier Letardif. Olivier later adopted the name Le Jeune, the surname of the Jesuit priest.

Around 1638, Olivier was arrested for falsely claiming that Nicolas Marsolet had received letters from the traitor Le Baillif, based on claims from sailors arriving from Tadoussac. Not wishing further trouble after his collaboration with the English, Marsolet took Olivier to court. An investigation took place, and witnesses claimed no one had seen Le Baillif's ship. Olivier was forced to admit he could not substantiate his claims, and was ordered to seek Marsolet's forgiveness and spend a day in chains – thus becoming the first black person punished in the region. Olivier Le Jeune signed with only a cross when he gave his testimony in 1638.

Olivier Le Jeune died on 10 May 1654. It was the first reported death of a black person in the St Lawrence. It is believed that by the time of his death his official status was changed from that of slave to that of free "domestic servant"; however, no proof of his emancipation was found. He may have been adopted by Couillard.

== Legacy ==
Le Jeune was designated a National Historic Person by Parks Canada in 2022. A commemorative plaque is located at Cartier-Brébeuf National Historic Site, 175 de l'Espinay Street, Québec.

== See also ==
- Black Canadian
- Slavery in Canada
