= Action of 17 July 1628 =

Naval battle

- Part of Anglo-French War (1627–1629)
Date	17 July 1628
Location	St. Lawrence River, near present-day Rimouski, Quebec
Result	English victory

Belligerents
England	France

Commanders and leaders
(Kingdom of England) David Kirke (Kingdom of England) Lewis Kirke	(Kingdom of France) Claude Roquement de Brison

Strength
5–6 men-of-war 1 pinnace	4 large merchant vessels 1 barque

Casualties and losses
none reported	4 merchant vessels captured 400 prisoners

The action of 17 July 1628 took place during the Anglo-French War (1627–1629). The English force led by the Kirke brothers succeeded in capturing a supply convoy bound for New France, severely impairing that colony's ability to resist attack.

== Background ==
War between England and France broke out over English support for French Huguenots besieged in La Rochelle by the forces of Louis XIII. Charles I of England commissioned David Kirke of Dieppe to seize French shipping in North America and expand English trade in the St. Lawrence valley. The French on the other hand had established a permanent base at Quebec in 1608 and were looking to expand their title that territory. Cardinal Richelieu had been the driving force behind the formation of the Compagnie des Cent-Associés to manage the fur trade and encourage settlement, in order to consolidate the tentative hold the French had in Canada. Led by Samuel de Champlain, efforts were being made to improve conditions at Quebec in preparation for the arrival of the first convoy of supplies and colonists.

Kirke and his fleet arrived off the coast of North America in the spring of 1628, seized the French post of Tadoussac as his base, and proceeded to attack French fishing vessels. In the meantime the French convoy had departed from Dieppe on April 28. It consisted of four large merchant vessels and a single barque under the command of Admiral Claude Roquement de Brison, carrying supplies and approximately 400 settlers for Quebec. It was the largest effort yet at populating New France. In June they arrived at Anticosti Island and learned of Kirke's presence.

== Prelude ==
In July Kirke sailed upriver from Tadoussac in order to seize Quebec. Champlain, who had been expecting badly needed supplies from France, did not know that Kirke had been in the St. Lawrence seizing vessels until just prior to the English arrival off Quebec on July 9. Kirke sent a message to Champlain demanding the town's surrender the next day. Champlain sent a bold refusal, hoping the English would not discover his desperate straits. Kirke did not want to gamble on attacking such a formidable defense position, and withdrew back towards Tadoussac.

== Battle ==
Unaware of the events that had taken place at Quebec, Admiral Roquement made the decision to bypass the English at Tadoussac under the cover of fog and if necessary fight their way through. Kirke's force on the other hand was larger and better equipped, and also had the advantage of being upstream from Roquement. On July 17 the two forces sighted each other and began to manoeuvre into position. Roquement, with both the current and the weather gauge against him, could not make a move to pass Kirke, and realized he had to fight. Kirke made better use of his advantages and anchored at extreme range in order to batter the French into surrender. Roquement attempted to do the same, but he had fewer cannon and inferior range. Kirke bombarded the French for fourteen or fifteen hours, while Roquement's efforts fell short. When their supply of gunpowder ran out, Roquement surrendered.

== Aftermath ==
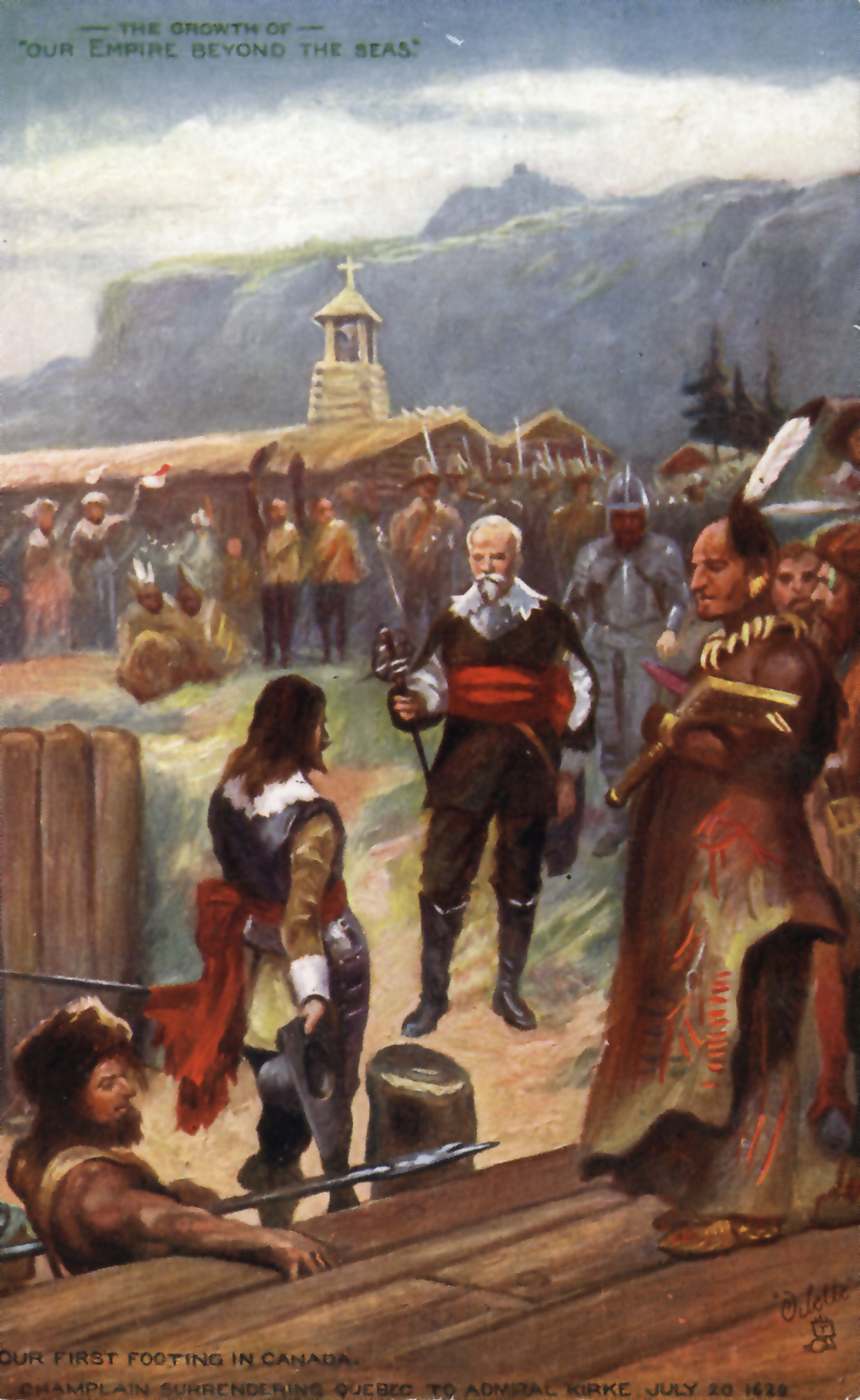
Champlain surrendering Quebec to Admiral Kirke, July 20 1628

The surrender of the French fleet yielded a great deal of plunder for Kirke, and this alone made his expedition a tremendous success, despite the failure to capture Quebec. King Charles commissioned him to make a return trip the next year in order to fulfill that goal. Champlain and the residents of Quebec faced a winter deprived of much needed supplies and reinforcements, and when Kirke returned in the spring of 1629 surrender was the only option. All the residents of New France were deported back to the mother country and Quebec became an English post. Upon his return to France Champlain learned that the war had ended before Kirke took Quebec, making the seizure illegal. Champlain lobbied for the return of New France, but did not succeed until the signing of the Treaty of Saint-Germain-en-Laye in 1632. He would return to New France the next year and oversee the establishment of substantial French settlement in Canada before his death in 1635. Kirke would later become Governor of Newfoundland.
