= Faith, Hope and Charity (Montagnais girls) =

Girls adopted by Samuel de Champlain

Faith, Hope and Charity were three Montagnais girls adopted by Samuel de Champlain. Faith soon left for the woods, whereas the two other girls remained with Champlain until he left New France in 1629 after being partially educated by him.

== History ==
Samuel de Champlain had for long the project of adopting young Native Americans to have them educated in France, but many parents refused. On 2 February 1628 however, the Montagnais offered him three girls (aged 11, 12 and 15) to reform the friendship with Champlain, which had been put in danger after the murder of two Frenchmen the previous autumn.

All three were happy to receive a French education. Faith soon left and returned to the woods, whereas Charity and Hope stayed at Fort Saint-Louis, where they were taught by Champlain "all they could comprehend". Champlain noted that they performed well.

This family life and attempt at "civilizing" them took an end with the war. After the surrender of Quebec, Champlain asked Lewis Kirke for authorization to bring back his daughters to France, which Kirke reluctantly agreed to. Nicolas Marsolet however wished to seduce the girls, and wrote to David Kirke that the Montagnais at Trois-Rivières refused to see the girls leave. Champlain claimed this was a lie, but David Kirke wished to maintain the tactical advantage and wished to avoid angering the natives. Champlain offered him 1,000 livres of goods, but Kirke refused due to Marsolet's intervention. The girls had been eager to go to France, and refused to drink or eat.

Champlain and his brother-in-law Eustache Boullé gave the girls a rosary each at the moment of departure. Champlain asked Guillaume Couillard to let the girls stay with his wife as long as they wished. Couillard left for Quebec on 14 September 1629. Champlain likely never saw them again, even after his return in 1633. They likely "returned to the woods".
