= Quebec expedition =

Quebec expedition or invasion of Quebec may refer to:

- Quebec expedition (1711), a British expedition during Queen Anne's War
- Conquest of New France (1758–1763), British conquest of what became Quebec during the Seven Years' War
- Invasion of Quebec (1775), an American invasion during the American Revolutionary War
- Fenian raids (1866–1871), incursions carried out by an Irish republican organization based in the United States

== See also ==
- Battle of Quebec (disambiguation)
- Siege of Quebec (disambiguation)
- Invasion of Canada (disambiguation)
