= Invasion of Canada =

The Invasion of Canada may refer to several events in history:

== Historical events ==
- The British and French colonial empires contested over Canada through several wars:
  - Surrender of Quebec (1629)
  - Battle of Quebec (1690)
  - Quebec expedition (1711)
  - King George's War (1744–1748)
  - French and Indian War (1724–1763)
- The United States invaded Canada during two separate conflicts:
  - Invasion of Quebec (1775)
  - War of 1812 (1812–1815)
- Patriot War (1837–1838)
- Fenian raids (1866–1871)
- War Plan Red (mid-1920s), a U.S. invasion plan created as a contingency for the unlikely event of war with the United Kingdom

== Arts and literature ==
- The Invasion of Canada, a 1980 book by Pierre Berton about the War of 1812
- Canadian Bacon, a 1995 comedy film which satirizes relations along the Canada–United States border

== See also ==
- Invasion of Quebec (disambiguation)
