= John Bowker =

John Bowker may refer to:

- John Bowker (theologian) (born 1935), English Anglican priest and pioneering scholar of religious studies
- John Bowker (baseball) (born 1983), American professional baseball player
- John Bowker (governor) (born 1770), Interim Governor of Newfoundland and British naval officer
