= Governor Hill =

Governor Hill may refer to:

- David B. Hill (1843–1910), 29th Governor of New York
- Sir George Hill, 2nd Baronet (1763–1839), Governor of Saint Vincent from 1830 to 1833 and Governor of Trinidad from 1833 to 1839
- Henry Worsley Hill (1799–1868), Governor of the Gold Coast from 1843 to 1845
- Isaac Hill (1789–1851), 16th Governor of New Hampshire
- John Fremont Hill (1855–1912), 45th Governor of Maine
- Stephen John Hill (1809–1891), Governor of the Gold Coast from 1851 to 1854, Governor of Sierra Leone from 1854 to 1863, Governor of Antigua from 1863 to 1869, and Governor of Newfoundland from 1869 to 1876
- William Hill (governor) (fl. 1630s), Proprietary Governor of the Province of Avalon in Newfoundland from 1634 to 1638
