= Battle of Quebec =

Battle of Quebec may refer to:

- Battle of Quebec (1690), a failed English assault during the War of the Grand Alliance
- Battle of Quebec (1759) or Battle of the Plains of Abraham, a battle during the Seven Years' War
- Battle of Quebec (1760) or Battle of Sainte-Foy, a battle outside the city during the Seven Years' War
- Battle of Quebec (1775), a failed American assault during the American Revolutionary War
- Battle of Quebec (ice hockey), a sports rivalry between the Montreal Canadiens and Quebec Nordiques

== See also ==
- Surrender of Quebec in 1629 during the Anglo-French War
- Battle of Beauport, a failed 1759 British assault on the city by way of its suburb of Beauport
- Siege of Quebec (disambiguation)
- Quebec expedition (disambiguation)
