= List of governors of Newfoundland and Labrador =

Standards of the Governor

Governors standard from 1870–1904

Governors standard from 1904–1975

Governors standard from 1975–1987

Governors standard from 1987–present

The following is a list of governors, commodore-governors, and lieutenant governors of Newfoundland and Labrador. Though the present day office of the lieutenant governor in Newfoundland and Labrador came into being only upon the province's entry into Canadian Confederation in 1949, the post is a continuation from the first governorship of Newfoundland in 1610.

== Proprietary governors of Newfoundland, 1610–1728 ==
#	Image	Name	Colony	Term start	Term end
Governors under James VI and I (1610–1625):
		John Guy	Cuper's Cove	1610	1614
		John Mason	Cuper's Cove	1615	1621
		Robert Hayman	Bristol's Hope	1618	1628
		Sir Richard Whitbourne	Renews	1618	1620
		Sir Francis Tanfield	South Falkland	1623	1626
		Edward Wynne	Ferryland	1621	1625
Governors under Charles I (1625–1649):
		Sir Arthur Aston	Avalon	1625	1627
		George Calvert, 1st Baron Baltimore	Avalon	1627	1629
		Cecilius Calvert, 2nd Baron Baltimore (Note: Lord Baltimore became the de facto Governor of Avalon upon the death of his father, the first Baron Baltimore.)	Avalon	1629	1632
		William Hill	Avalon	1634	1638
1.		Sir David Kirke	Newfoundland	1638	→
Governors under Oliver Cromwell (1649–1658):
1.		cont...		←	1651
2.		John Treworgie	Newfoundland	1653	→
Governors under Richard Cromwell (1658–1660):
2.		cont...		←	→
Governors under Charles II (1660):
2.		cont...		←	1660

== Governors of Plaisance, 1655–1713 ==
#	Image	Name	Term start	Term end
Governors under Louis XIV (1655–1713):
		Sieur de Kéréon	1655	1655
		Nicolas Gargot de la Rochette	1660	1660
		Thalour Du Perron	1662	1663
		Lafontaine Bellot	1664	1667
		Sieur de la Palme	1667	1670
		Sieur de la Poippe	1670	1684
		Antoine Parat	1685	1690
		Louis de Pastour de Costebelle	1690	1691
		Jacques-François de Monbeton de Brouillan	1690	1701
		Joseph de Monic	1697	1702
		Daniel d'Auger de Subercase	1702	1706
		Philippe Pastour de Costebelle	1706	1713

== Lieutenant-governors of Placentia, 1713–1770 ==
#	Image	Name	Governor from	Governor until
Lieutenant-Governors under George I (1713–1727) (Subject to Governor of Nova Scotia and Placentia):
1.		John Moody	1714	1717
2.		Martin Purcell	1717	1719
3.		Samuel Gledhill	1719	1729
Lieutenant-Governors under George II (1727–1760):
1.		Henry Cope	1736	?1742
1.		Otho Hamilton	1744	c.1764
1.		Joseph Goreham	1770	

== Commodore-governors of Newfoundland, 1729–1825 ==
The Commodore-Governor was a Royal Navy officer who was commander of the annual fishing convoy which left England each spring to fish off Newfoundland and was charged with protecting the convoys from harm. He was also responsible for various administrative and judicial functions, including assisting the fishing admirals in maintaining law and order and compiling the annual report on the fishery for the English government. By 1818, the colony had a significant enough permanent population to justify having a resident governor.

#	Image	Name	Term start	Term end
Governors under George II (1729–1760):
3.		Henry Osborn	1729	1730
4.		George Clinton	1731	1731
5.		Edward Falkingham	1732	1732
6.		Robert MacCarty, Viscount Muskerry	1733	1734
7.		FitzRoy Henry Lee	1735	1737
8.		Philip Vanbrugh	1738	1738
9.		Henry Medley	1739	1740
10.		Thomas Smith	1741	1741
11.		John Byng (Note: John Byng's elder brother, Robert Byng, was the great-great-grandfather of The Viscount Byng of Vimy, who served as Governor General of Canada from 1921 to 1926.)	1742	1742
10.		Thomas Smith (second time)	1743	1743
12.		Sir Charles Hardy	1744	1744
13.		Richard Edwards	1745	1745
14.		Sir James Douglas, 1st Baronet	1746	1746
15.		John Bradstreet	1747	1747
15.		Charles Watson	1748	1748
16.		George Brydges Rodney, 1st Baron Rodney	1749	1749
17.		Francis William Drake	1750	1752
18.		Hugh Bonfoy	1753	1754
19.		Richard Dorrill	1755	1756
20.		Richard Edwards	1757	1759
21.		James Webb	1760	→
Governors under George III (1760–1820):
21.		cont...	←	1760
22.		Thomas Graves	1761	1763
23.		Sir Hugh Palliser	1764	1768
24.		John Byron	1769	1771
25.		Molyneux Shuldham	1772	1774
26.		Robert Duff	1775	1775
27.		John Montagu	1776	1778
28.		Richard Edwards	1779	1781
29.		John Campbell	1782	1785
30.		John Elliot	1786	1788
31.		Mark Milbanke	1789	1791
32.		Sir Richard King, 1st Baronet	1792	1793
33.		Sir James Wallace	1794	1796
34.		William Waldegrave	1797	1799
35.		Sir Charles Pole, 1st Baronet	1800	1801
36.		James Gambier	1802	1803
37.		Sir Erasmus Gower	1804	1806
38.		John Holloway	1807	1809
39.		Sir John Duckworth	1810	1812
40.		Sir Richard Goodwin Keats	1813	1816
41.		Francis Pickmore	1817	1818
		John Bowker	1818	1818
42.		Sir Charles Hamilton, 2nd Baronet, of Marlborough House	1818	→
Governors under George IV (1820–1825):
42.		cont...	←	1825

== Civil governors of Newfoundland, 1825–1855 ==
#	Image	Name	Term start	Term end
Governors under George IV (1825–1830):
43.		Sir Thomas John Cochrane	1825	→
Governors under William IV (1830–1837):
43.		cont...	←	1834
44.		Sir Henry Prescott	1834	→
Governors under Queen Victoria (1837–1855):
44.		cont...	←	1841
45.		Sir John Harvey	1841	1846
		Robert Law (colonial administrator)	1846	1847
46.		Sir John Le Marchant	1847	1852
47.		Ker Baillie-Hamilton	1852	1855

== Colonial governors of Newfoundland, 1855–1907 ==
#	Image	Name	Term start	Term end
Governors under Queen Victoria (1855–1901):
48.		Sir Charles Henry Darling	1855	1857
49.		Sir Alexander Bannerman	1857	1864
50.		Sir Anthony Musgrave	1864	1869
51.		Sir Stephen John Hill	1869	1876
52.		Sir John Hawley Glover	1876	1881
53.		Sir Henry Berkeley Fitzhardinge Maxse	1881	1883
52.		Sir John Hawley Glover (second time)	1883	1885
54.		Sir William Des Vœux	1886	1887
55.		Sir Henry Arthur Blake	1887	1889
56.		Sir John Terence Nicholls O'Brien	1889	1895
57.		Sir Herbert Harley Murray	1895	1898
58.		Sir Henry Edward McCallum	1898	→
Governors under Edward VII (1901–1907):
58.		cont...	←	1901
59.		Sir Charles Cavendish Boyle	1901	1904
60.		Sir William MacGregor	1904	1907

== Governors of the Dominion of Newfoundland, 1907–1934 ==
#	Image	Name	Term start	Term end
Governors under Edward VII (1907–1910):
60.		Sir William MacGregor (continued)	1907	1909
61.		Sir Ralph Champneys Williams	1909	→
Governors under George V (1910–1934):
61.		cont...	←	1913
62.		Sir Walter Edward Davidson	1913	1917
63.		Sir Charles Alexander Harris	1917	1922
64.		Sir William Allardyce	1922	1928
65.		Sir John Middleton	1928	1932
66.		Sir David Murray Anderson	1933	1934

== Commission governors of Newfoundland, 1934–1949 ==
#	Image	Name	Term start	Term end
Governors under George V (1934–1936):
66.		Sir David Murray Anderson (continued)	1934	1935
67.		Sir Humphrey T. Walwyn	1936	→
Governors under Edward VIII (1936):
67.		cont...	←	→
Governors under George VI (1936–1949):
67.		cont...	←	1946
68.		Sir Gordon MacDonald	1946	1949

== Lieutenant governors of Newfoundland, 1949–1999 ==
#	Image	Name	Term start	Term end
Lt. Governors under George VI (1949–1952):
69.		Sir Albert Walsh	1949	1949
70.		Sir Leonard Outerbridge	1949	→
Lt. Governors under Elizabeth II (1952–1999):
70.		cont...	←	1957
71.		Campbell Leonard Macpherson	1957	1963
72.		Fabian O'Dea	1963	1969
73.		Ewart John Arlington Harnum	1969	1974
74.		Gordon Arnaud Winter	1974	1981
75.		William Anthony Paddon	1981	1986
76.		James McGrath	1986	1991
77.		Frederick Russell	1991	1997
78.		Arthur Maxwell House	1997	1999

== Lieutenant governors of Newfoundland and Labrador, 1999–present ==
#	Image	Name	Term start	Term end
Governors under Elizabeth II (1999–2022):
78.		Arthur Maxwell House	1999	2002
79.		Edward Roberts	2002	2008
80.		John Crosbie	2008	2013
81. (Note: Colour denotes living former lieutenant governors)		Frank Fagan	2013	2018
82.		Judy Foote	2018	→
Governors under Charles III (2022–present):
82.		cont...	←	2023
83.		Joan Marie Aylward	2023	Present

== See also ==
- Office-holders of Canada
- Canadian incumbents by year
