= Antoine Parat =

Antoine Parat was Governor of Plaisance (Placentia), Newfoundland from 1685 to 1690.

== See also ==
- David Basset
- Governors of Newfoundland
- List of people of Newfoundland and Labrador

Political offices
Preceded by La Poippe	Governor of Plaisance; 1685–1690	Succeeded by Louis de Pastour de Costebelle
