= MV Canadian Miner =

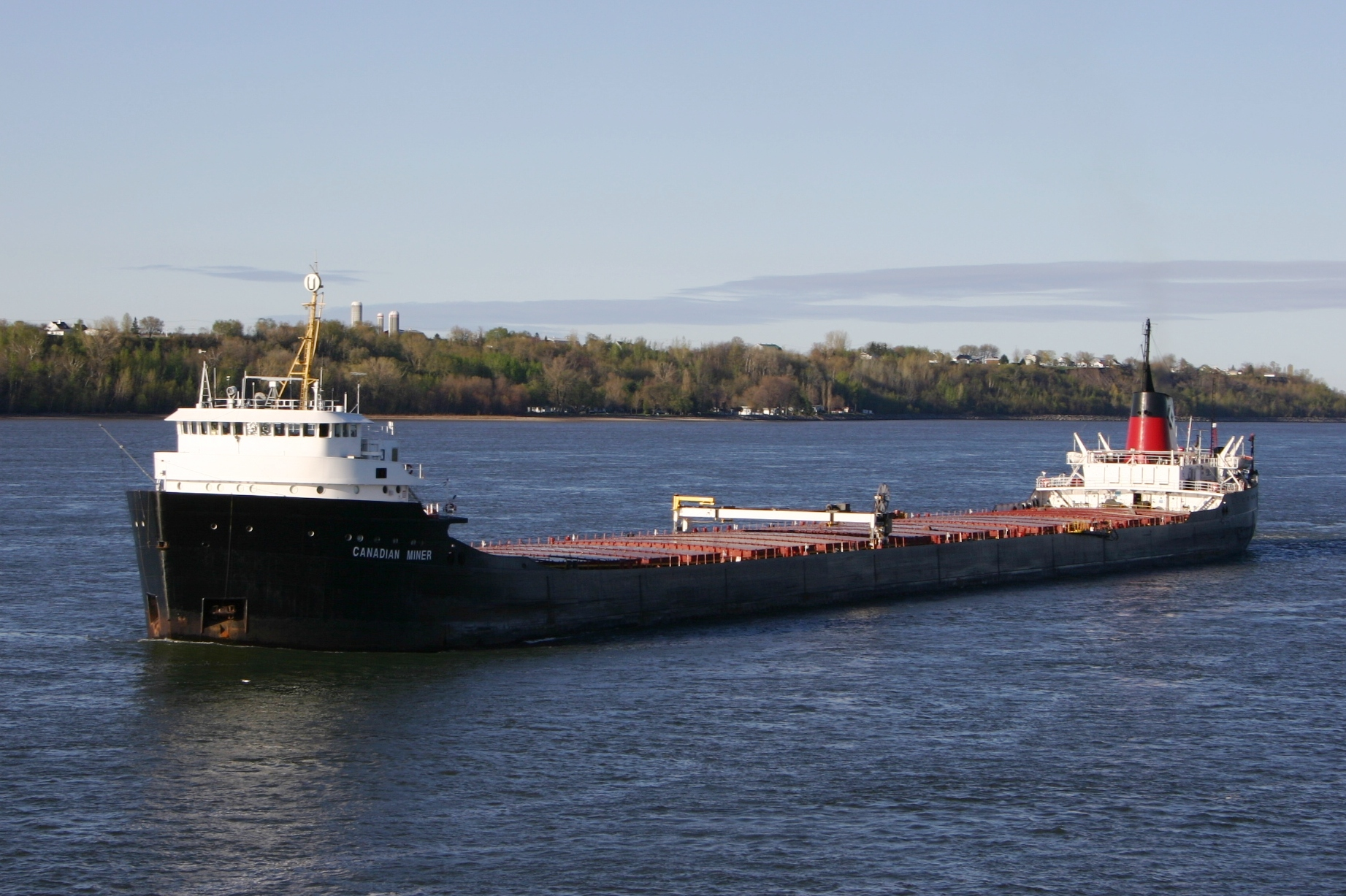
- Canadian Miner on the Saint Lawrence River

History
- Name: Maplecliffe Hall (1966–1988); Le Moyne (1988–1994); Canadian Miner (1994–2011); Miner (2011–present)
- Owner: Hall Navigation (1966–1988); Canada Steamship Lines (1988–1994); Upper Lakes Shipping (1994–2011); Arivina Navigation SA (2011)
- Builder: Canadian Vickers, Montreal
- Yard number: 287
- Launched: 13 November 1965
- Completed: 25 April 1966
- Maiden voyage: 1966
- In service: 1966–2011
- Identification: IMO number: 6601674
- Fate: Ran aground on Scatarie Island, Nova Scotia while being towed for scrapping in Turkey.

General characteristics
- Type: Bulk carrier
- Tonnage: 17,831 GT; 27,650 DWT
- Length: 222.5 m (730 ft) oa.; 215.7 m (708 ft) pp.
- Beam: 23 m (75 ft)
- Draught: 8.2 m (27 ft)
- Installed power: four 2-stroke diesel engines (4 x 1,471 kW (1,973 hp))
- Propulsion: Single shaft
- Speed: 17 knots (31 km/h; 20 mph)

MV Canadian Miner was a Canadian laker that was part of the fleet of Upper Lakes Shipping from 1994–2011. Initially constructed as Maplecliffe Hall in 1966, the ship was renamed Lemoyne in 1988 before becoming Canadian Miner in 1994. In 2011, the name was shortened to just Miner. In 2011 the vessel was taken out of service and sold for scrapping. While en route to the scrapyard in Turkey, the ship ran aground off Nova Scotia in 2011. The vessel was broken up in 2014 in Nova Scotia.

== Design and description ==
Canadian Miner was 222.5 metres (730 ft 0 in) long overall and 215.7 metres (707 ft 8 in) between perpendiculars with a beam of 23 metres (75 ft 6 in). The ship had a draught of 8.2 metres (27 ft). Canadian Miner had a gross tonnage of 17,831 and a deadweight tonnage of 27,650.

She was powered by four 1,471-kilowatt (1,973 hp) 2-stroke diesel engines. Unusual amongst lakers, she was never equipped with a bow thruster. She had a maximum speed of 17 knots (31 km/h; 20 mph).

== Service history ==
The vessel was constructed in sections. The bow and cargo sections were built by G T Davie at Lauzon, Quebec under yard number 97. The vessel was launched on 13 November 1965. The ship was assembled by Canadian Vickers at its Montreal shipyard in 1966 under yard number 287. The ship was completed on 25 April 1966.

The vessel began service in 1966 as MV Maplecliffe Hall and was operated by her first owners Hall Navigation until 1988. Like most lakers the vessel was a bulk carrier designed to ship grain, iron ore, aggregate or coal. In 1984 Hall experimented with the vessel carrying standard shipping containers but it was not deemed a success.

Hall Navigation dissolved in 1988 and its assets were acquired by Canada Steamship Lines (CSL). The ship was renamed MV Lemoyne and she operated under CSL ownership until 1994. CSL sold the ship to Upper Lakes Shipping in 1994 and she was renamed MV Canadian Miner. The vessel had been built with a rarely used owner's stateroom. In 2006, to help raise funds to equip Georgian College with a marine simulator, Upper Lakes Shipping offered a trip for two in the owner's stateroom as the grand prize in a raffle.

In 2011 the ship was sold to Arvina Navigation SA, Turkey and renamed simply MV Miner for her final trip.

=== 2011 grounding ===
Canadian Miner aground off Scatarie Island, Nova Scotia

In early September 2011, Arivina Navigation SA contracted the tow of MV Miner from Montreal to the Greek-owned tugboat Hellas. The destination was likely the Aliağa Ship Breaking Yard on the Aegean Sea. The tow transited the St Lawrence River and Gulf of St Lawrence without incident.

On September 20, 2011 Hellas encountered gales in the Cabot Strait and the tow line to MV Miner parted. MV Miner drifted for multiple hours before grounding on the northeast coast of Scatarie Island. This island and its surrounding waters is a pristine wilderness and the Government of Nova Scotia has designated the entire island as part of the Scatarie Island Wildlife Management Area since 1 October 1976.

During the days that followed the grounding, media revealed that MV Miner had "3,000 litres of oily waste" stored on board. Hellas made port in nearby Sydney where the tugboat was arrested by the Government of Nova Scotia; the tug's owners were forced to post a bond of several million dollars to secure her release.

It was initially hoped by officials with the provincial government that Transport Canada would pay for the removal of MV Miner, since the tow was operating under federal shipping regulations at the time of the grounding. The Government of Canada denied any responsibility in paying for cleanup costs of the provincial wildlife management area, which were initially estimated to be at least $5 million CAD. Only weeks later, the Government of Nova Scotia estimated that if the wreck could not be towed away, and had to be taken apart on-site, costs could rise as high as $25 million CAD.

In fall 2011, after it became apparent the Government of Canada was not going to undertake a salvage operation before winter set in, the Government of Nova Scotia contracted a company in an "emergency operation" to remove contaminants from on board the wreck, including the oily waste water, fire extinguishers, furniture from the cabins, and other floatable material.

Storms during fall 2011 and winter 2012 opened several large holes in the hull of MV Miner, precluding plans for refloating the ship.

=== 2012 salvage attempt ===
In the Spring of 2012, the Government of Nova Scotia received a plan from Bennington Group of New York City to salvage the vessel during the summer weather window in 2012. Bennington Group was in a joint venture partnership with the ship's owner, Arvina Navigation SA, and Armada Offshore of Turkey; they were not contracted by the Province. The Cape Breton Post reported on April 16, 2012, that the salvage experts contracted by the provincial government were expected to return a salvage plan shortly. Nothing happened in summer 2012 and the Halifax Chronicle Herald reported on September 13, 2012 that a contractor (the Bennington Group of New York City) was preparing to commence salvage operations. The plan by Bennington Group was to place excavators fitted with plasma cutting torches on the island, and to cut the ship into pieces, which would be loaded by barge and taken to Sydney where they could be further disassembled.

On September 21, 2012, CTV News reported that the salvage operation had not started. It was also reported that the salvage contract would expire in December 2012.

The Toronto Star reported that the Bennington Group had complained that the salvage company hired by the Government of Nova Scotia in the fall 2011 "emergency operation" to remove potential floatable debris and contaminants had actually left many floatable items behind, and had instead stripped the ship of up to $500,000 in non-ferrous metals, including brass fittings such as portholes.

The salvage contract ended in December 2012 with the Bennington Group failing to start any salvage operations.

=== 2014–2015 salvage contract completed ===
In winter 2014 the Government of Nova Scotia posted a request for proposal for the removal and salvage of MV Miner. No budget was identified but it was expected a tender would be awarded in spring 2014 to coincide with the summer weather window. In May 2014, a $12,000,000 contract to remove the wreck was awarded to RJ MacIsaac Construction and work was to be completed by November 2014. The wreck was found to have an unexpected 26,000 litres (5,700 imp gal; 6,900 US gal) of diesel fuel as well as 32 tonnes of asbestos. This resulted in a delay and the last piece was removed on June 22, 2015.
