= Nicolas Marsolet =

French interpreter, trader and seigneur

Nicolas Marsolet de Saint-Aignan (1601 – 15 May 1677) was a French interpreter, trader and seigneur.

== History ==
Nicolas Marsolet was baptized on 7 February 1601 in Saint-Pierre-le-Portier, Rouen, France to Nicollas Marsollet.

He likely came to New France in 1613. On the same year, he would have joined Samuel de Champlain on an expedition. Starting then, Marsolet likely split his time between the posts at Tadoussac, Quebec, Trois-Rivières and the Algonkin villages of the Ottawa River region, living with the Natives and seeking profit.

He was present in Tadoussac in 1623 and 1624. On 24 March 1627 he was in Paris. In summer 1627 he was in Canada, fur trading at Cap-de-la-Victoire. He was perhaps the "interpreter" incapacitated by pleurisy who spent the winter of 1625–1626 with the Jesuits and taught Charles Lalemant.

Marsolet ruined Chaplain's plan to bring back his adopted daughters Charity and Hope, to keep them near him to "debauch" them or to punish Espérance for refusing his advances. He misled David Kirke into thinking the Native Americans would be angry at their departure, and Kirke, seeking to keep their goodwill, refused to allow so.

Whereas the majority of the French sailed back to France at the end of summer 1629, Marsolet stayed and served as an interpreter for the English. When the French came back in 1632, he again changed allegiance.

In 1629 he was accused alongside Étienne Brûlé by Chaplain of being "without religion, eating meat on Friday and Saturday", of being a libertine and a debauchee, and of having betrayed King and country for money by "putting themselves at the disposal of the English when Quebec was taken by the Kirke brothers."

Like most fur traders, Marsolet distrusted the missionnaries and the settlers for their influence over the Native population who supplied the fur. He refused to teach Native tongues to the Jesuits (except Charles Lalemand), claiming that he had sworn not to teach Native languages to anyone.

Until 1636 Marsolet was a supporter of merchants and clerks who opposed the populating of the colony and concerned themselves only with wealth and furs. There was no sign that the movement would be checked however, and Marsolet sided with the general opinion and decided to settle down. On 26 March 1637 he married Marie le Barbier at Saint-Sauveur, Rouen. On 6 October 1637, he took the seigneurie of Bellechasse (Berthier) which had been granted to him on 28 March 1636 by the Company of One Hundred Associates. On 20 November 1640, he bought a tract of land on the Sainte-Geneviève hill. From then on he lived a calm life. He was described as a collaborator of the missionaries in 1643.

Marsolet became a clerk of the Company of One Hundred Associates around 1642 because of his experience with Native American matters and the fur trade. He had continued to act as an interpreter, but also began again to traffic fur by himself. Marsolet disapproved of the luxurious lifestyle of the Company of Habitants and incited a protest against them in January 1646, which was repressed by the governor. From thereon he had to rely on his own ressources for the fur trade. By 1647 he owned a boat which he used in his trips to Tadoussac for the fur trade. Around 1660 he operated a shop at Quebec City.

Marsolet, nicknamed “little king of Tadoussac,” preferred fur trading to developing his lands (perhaps due to lack of funds). He obtained the Marsolet meadows from the Abbé La Ferté in the Cap-de-la-Madeleine seigneurie on 5 April 1644. He was given land in the future Gentilly seigneurie by the Company of New France on 16 April 1647. He was given the Marsolet fief by Jean Talon in the future Lotbinière seigneurie. None of these were lived on by Marsolet or cleared by his efforts. He was also given 71 acres of land on Sainte-Geneviève hill by the Company of New France on 29 March 1649 and 16 acres on St. Charles River on 10 February 1651 by Louis d'Ailleboust. Only the land on Sainte-Geneviève hill was brought to be cultivated, and two buildings and a barn were built on them.

While still occasionally acting as an interpreter, Marsolet stopped doing his trips to Tadoussac shortly before 1660 to devote himself to his Quebec City business. He would die there on 15 May 1677. He had 10 children.

He sold the land in the future Gentilly seigneurie to Michel Pelletier de La Prade on 23 October 1671. He gave the Bellechasse seigneurie to Alexandre Berthier on 15 November 1672.
