= Lafontaine Bellot =

Lafontaine Bellot (Bellot dit Lafontaine) was Governor of Plaisance (Placentia), Newfoundland from 1664 to 1667.

Bellot was in charge of a small fort and garrison that protected the interests of the French fishery in the area. He was an ineffective governor who misused his power and was recalled in 1667.

== See also ==
- Governors of Newfoundland
- List of people from Newfoundland and Labrador

Political offices
Preceded by Thalour Du Perron	Governor of Plaisance; 1664–1667	Succeeded by La Palme
