= Nicolas Gargot de la Rochette =

Nicolas Gargot de La Rochette was Governor of Plaisance (Placentia), Newfoundland in 1660. The post was left vacant until 1662.

== See also ==
- Governors of Newfoundland
- List of people of Newfoundland and Labrador

Political offices
Preceded by Sieur de Kéréon	Governor of Plaisance; 1660	Succeeded by Thalour Du Perron
