= David Basset =

- Born: Acadia, New France
- Died: 1724; West Indies
- Cause of death: Homicide
- Occupations: Merchant, privateer

David Basset (fl 1687–1724) was a merchant active in Newfoundland and New England. He was French born Huguenot.

== Background ==
Little is known of Basset's earlier years other than that he probably resided in Acadia, married and had a family. He was known in Boston as a merchant trading between New England and Newfoundland. Trade included the usual goods from Boston being traded for fish.

In 1687, he became embroiled in a dispute with Antoine Parat, Governor of Plaisance (Placentia), Newfoundland, over transporting two Huguenots to Boston when the governor wanted to deport them to France. His ship was confiscated and he was sent to prison in France. A pardon occurred on conditions of becoming a settler at Port Royal, Acadia. Basset went to Boston for his family and did not return.

Basset commanded a ship against the French when William Phips, colonial governor of Massachusetts, sailed for Acadia in April 1690 and captured Port Royal. He was active in trade and privateering over the next few years. He had extended his trade to the West Indies.

In 1697, Basset was captured by the French and taken to Acadia. He agreed to serve the French as a pilot in an agreement arrived at with Governor Villebon. Again, the family was to move to Acadia but never arrived. After Villebon's death, the temporary governor arrested Basset again.

It is presumed that Basset's trading and privateering career continued until his death from a slit throat in 1724 aboard his ship in the West Indies.
