= HMS Abigail =

Three ships of the Royal Navy have borne the name HMS Abigail:

- English ship Abigail (1615) was an armed merchantman launched in 1615 and lost in a hurricane in 1639; requisitioned by the Royal Navy on multiple occasions.
- HMS Abigail (1666) was a 4-gun fireship purchased in 1666 and expended later that year.
- HMS Abigail (1812) was a 3-gun cutter captured from the Danish by HMS Hamadryad in 1812 and sold in 1814.
