= Sieur de la Poippe =

The Sieur de la Poippe was the Governor of Plaisance (nowadays Placentia) in the French colony of Newfoundland from 1670 to 1684.

Political offices
Preceded by La Palme	Governor of Plaisance; 1670–1684	Succeeded by Antoine Parat
