= Sara Kirke =

Newfoundland entrepreneur (d. 1680s)

Lady Sara Kirke (died 1680s) was the wife of Sir David Kirke (c. 1597–1654), the governor of Newfoundland between 1638 and 1651. She is considered to be North America's "first and foremost entrepreneur".

== Biography ==
Lady Sara Kirke arrived at the Province of Avalon, in what is now the area surrounding Ferryland, Newfoundland and Labrador in 1638, with her husband, Sir David Kirke, following his appointment as Proprietary Governor. When David Kirke was recalled to England in 1651, under a cloud of allegations of financial impropriety, Lady Kirke continued to reside in Avalon, conducting the family businesses.

Upon the death of Sir David in 1654, allegedly while imprisoned in England, Lady Sara inherited a third of her husband's estate, based on dower rights. This protection from creditors and personal wealth allowed her to become one of North America's earliest and most successful entrepreneurs. Lady Sara ran the largest plantation that existed at that time, the Pool Plantation of Ferryland. According to the 1660 census, she was the largest planter in Newfoundland and owned more stages, boats, and train (cod liver oil) vats than any other planter.

Lady Kirke and her children were still in Ferryland in 1673, when a Dutch fleet sacked and burned the settlement during the Third Anglo-Dutch War.

Dame Sara Kirke managed the Pool Plantation at Ferryland throughout this period. Between 1651 and her retirement in 1679, Sara and her sons developed a number of plantations at Ferryland and Renews. During raids by Dutch ships from New Amsterdam in 1665 and 1672 in the Anglo-Dutch Wars, their lands were targeted by the Dutch.

== Death and aftermath ==
It is believed Sara Kirke died in the 1680s.

In 1683, Sir John Kirke (David's brother) whose daughter had married Pierre-Esprit Radisson and who was himself a member of Prince Rupert's Hudson's Bay Company, asked the king for compensation for the losses incurred in the conquest of Canada in 1629. He claimed that the French had never paid the Kirkes for the return of the lands. The last known reference to his nephew George Kirke dates from 1680, when he was proposed as a collector of the toll levied on all boats fishing in Newfoundland waters.

As late as 1696, three of David and Sara Kirke's sons, George, David the Younger, and Phillip, remained substantial planters on the Southern Shore of Newfoundland.

== Recognition ==
The Canadian Advanced Technology Alliance (CATAAlliance) presents a Sara Kirke Award for Woman Entrepreneurship in memory of Lady Kirke, awarded annually to Canada's leading female high tech entrepreneur.
