= Sieur de la Palme =

French colonial governor (fl. 1667–1670)

The Sieur de la Palme was the Governor of Plaisance (now Placentia) in the New-France (French: Nouvelle-France) colony in Newfoundland from 1667 to 1670.

In 1667, the King of France, Louis XIV, learned of the irresponsible behaviour of the previous governor, Bellot dit Lafontaine. An official document indicated that Bellot had "fulfilled his duty badly" (French: "mal acquitté de son devoir"). Louis XIV, frustrated with his governor, immediately recalled him to France. The king named La Palme as the new governor at Plaisance.

La Palme arrived in Newfoundland on board the ship Saint-Sébastien. He received the mission from the King to help populate the colony of Plaisance, to encourage agriculture and to protect the French fishing interests. The new governor disembarked at Plaisance with 150 soldiers and numerous supplies, notably weapons stored in two warships that accompanied him from France.

La Palme built fortifications around Plaisance to protect from a possible attack from the English.

However, La Palme displeased the colonists with shows of authoritarianism. He demanded one third of the fish caught from the fishermen in exchange for provisions. Finally, the King relieveed him from his administrative functions in 1670 and replaced him with a new governor named La Poippe.

Political offices
Preceded by Lafontaine Bellot	Governor of Plaisance; 1667–1670	Succeeded by La Poippe
