= Sieur de Kéréon =

Sieur de Kéréon was the first French Governor of Plaisance (Placentia), Newfoundland in 1655. The post was left vacant until 1660.

== See also ==
- Governors of Newfoundland
- List of people of Newfoundland and Labrador

Political offices
| Preceded by none | Governor of Plaisance; 1655 | Succeeded by Nicolas Gargot de la Rochette |
