= Chateau Bay =

Bay and former settlement in Labrador, Canada

Coordinates: 51.980°N 55.895°W

Fort Baie-Château
- Chateau Bay

Site information
- Type: French fort

Site history
- Built: 1740

Location of Chateau Bay in Newfoundland and Labrador

Chateau Bay (historically also spelled as Chateaux Bay) is a bay and former settlement in Labrador, Canada. Historically it is also sometimes called York Harbour, a name given by James Webb in 1760 when he claimed the harbour for the English. It was surveyed by James Cook in 1763, during his survey of the Strait of Belle Isle aboard HMS Grenville. In August 1766 Joseph Banks arrived in Chateau Bay as a part of a partially scientific journey to study and collect the plants and animals. One of the specimens collected there was the now extinct great auk.
