= Abgal (disambiguation) =

The term Abgal refers to the Seven Sages of Ancient Mesopotamian tradition.

Abgal may also refer to:

- Abgal (god), a Palmyrene deity

== See also ==
- Abgaal, a Somali clan
- Abigail (disambiguation)
