= Siege of Quebec =

Siege of Quebec may refer to:

- Siege of Quebec (1759), prior to the Battle of the Plains of Abraham
- Siege of Quebec (1760), an unsuccessful French attempt to retake Quebec City from the British
- Siege of Quebec (1775), after the Battle of Quebec between American forces and British defenders

== See also ==
- Surrender of Quebec in 1629 during the Anglo-French War
- Battle of Quebec (disambiguation)
