= Thalour Du Perron =

Governor of Plaisance 1662-1663

Governor of Plaisance
- In office 1662–1663
- Preceded by: Nicolas Gargot de la Rochette
- Succeeded by: Lafontaine Bellot

Personal details
- Born: Nantes, Kingdom of France
- Died: Winter 1662-1663 (Note: Likely between the months of December-February) Plaisance, Terre-Neuve
- Cause of death: Assassination

Thalour Du Perron was Governor of Plaisance (Placentia), Newfoundland from 1662 to 1663.

In July, 1662, Du Perron and many others including 50 colonists, 30 soldiers, his brother, and Nicholas Gargot, the former Governor of the Colony, set sail for Plaisance.

The ship, Aigle d'Or, would arrive to Plaisance in October; Gargot carried on to Quebec.

Several months later in the winter time du Perron and his brother would be assassinated.

In the spring of 1663, 15 of the men who had killed Du Perron and his brother were captured and brought to Quebec to face trial.

== See also ==
- Governors of Newfoundland
- List of people of Newfoundland and Labrador

== Notes ==
Political offices
Preceded by Nicolas Gargot de la Rochette	Governor of Plaisance; 1662–1663	Succeeded by Bellot dit Lafontaine
