= List of storms named Abigail =

The name Abigail has been used for two tropical cyclones in the Australian region of the South Pacific Ocean. It has also been used for one extratropical European windstorm.

In the Australian region:

- Severe Tropical Cyclone Abigail (1982), a category 4 cyclone that lingered off the Queensland coast
- Severe Tropical Cyclone Abigail (2001), a category 3 storm in Australia that made landfall in Queensland, Australia

The name Abigail was retired in the Australian region after the 2000–01 season.

In Europe:

- Storm Abigail (2015), affected Scotland
