= Francis Pickmore =

British Naval officer and Governor of Newfoundland

Vice-Admiral Francis Pickmore
- Born: c.1756 Chester, England
- Died: 24 February 1818; St. John's, Newfoundland
- Military career
- Allegiance: United Kingdom
- Branch: Royal Navy
- Service years: c.1777–1818
- Rank: Vice-admiral
- Commands: HMS Surprise; HMS Vaughan; HMS Keppel; HMS Thalia; HMS Royal William; HMS Utrecht; HMS Ramillies; Governor of Newfoundland
- Conflicts: American Revolutionary War; French Revolutionary Wars; Napoleonic Wars; Invasion of the Danish West Indies

Viceregal styles of Francis Pickmore
- Reference style: His Excellency
- Spoken style: Your Excellency

Vice-Admiral Francis Pickmore (c. 1756 – 24 February 1818) was a Royal Navy officer and colonial governor.

== Naval career ==
Francis Pickmore was born in Chester in England and joined the Royal Navy around 1770.

He was in service in Newfoundland when he received his commission as a lieutenant in December 1777. In June 1782 he was given his first command, HMS Vaughan, moving to HMS Keppel six months later. He was promoted to captain in September 1780 and given command of the 36-gun HMS Thalia. In 1794 he took command of HMS Royal William one of the largest ships in the Royal Navy, with 84 guns and a crew of 750 men.

In August 1812 Pickmore reached the rank of vice-admiral. He was appointed governor of Newfoundland in 1816. Pickmore's term was marked by strife and severe economic depression that had hit the island following the Napoleonic Wars and influx of Irish immigrants. Pickmore is noted as the first governor of Newfoundland to stay the winter. He died in St. John's and Captain John Bowker, a senior officer under Pickmore's command and commander of Pickmore's flagship HMS Sir Francis Drake, acted as governor until Sir Charles Hamilton arrived.

Pickmore's body was returned to England for burial.

== See also ==
- Governors of Newfoundland
- List of people from Newfoundland and Labrador

Political offices
Preceded by Sir Richard Goodwin Keats	Commodore Governor of Newfoundland; 1816–1818	Succeeded by John Bowker
