= John Treworgie =

American politician

John Treworgie (born ca. 1618, date of death unknown) was the last Proprietary Governor of Newfoundland. Treworgie had worked as an agent at a Kittery, Maine trading post from 1635 to 1650. In 1651 he was named as one of a party of six sent to Newfoundland to arrest Sir David Kirke who had been accused of withholding taxes collected on behalf of the crown and otherwise violating the royal charter which granted him the governorship of Newfoundland. His party was also ordered to administer the fishery and collect taxes on fish and oil from foreign fishermen. He remained after the arrest of Kirke and was named governor by the English government and given authority over both migratory fisherman and colonists and ordered to fortify the colony. John Treworgie was the son of James Treworgie (or Treworgy), the son-in-law of Alexander Shapleigh, a Devonshire merchant and fisheries owner who founded Kittery, Maine. John Treworgie was the brother-in-law of Hon. John Gilman of Exeter, New Hampshire.

In 1654 Treworgie and two other commissioners were arrested for illegally taking possession of David Kirke's property and was found guilty. Oliver Cromwell ordered a second trial which cleared him and Treworgie continued as governor until 1660.

In 1660, he asked for another term as governor but the legal conflict between Cecil Calvert, 2nd Baron Baltimore and the Kirke family over ownership of Newfoundland complicated matters and it is unlikely Treworgie ever returned to the island.
