= Richard Edwards (Royal Navy officer, died 1795) =

Royal Navy Admiral and colonial administrator (1715–1795)

Admiral Richard Edwards
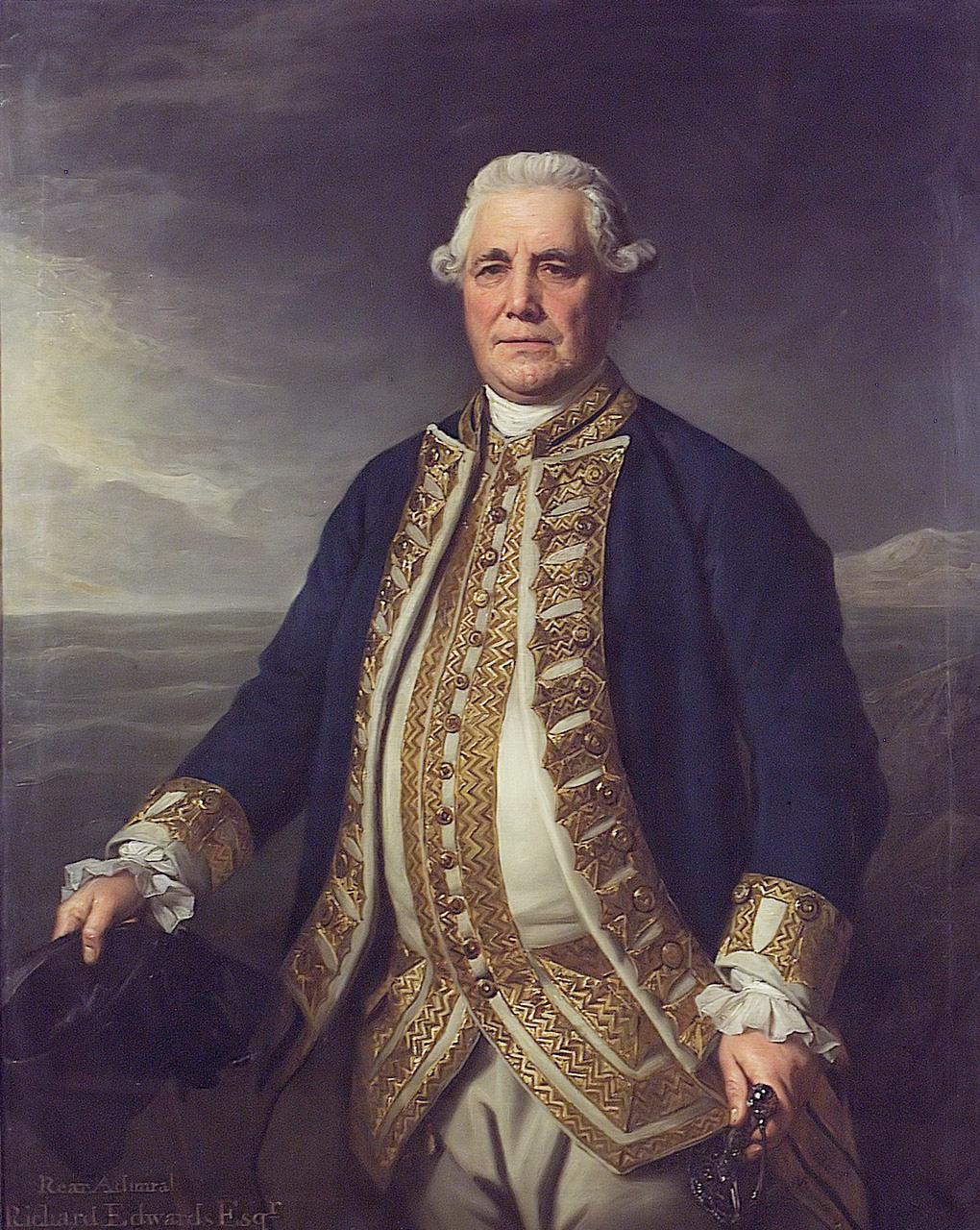
- Edwards in 1780
- Born: c. 1715
- Died: February 3, 1795 (aged 79–80); Fordwich, Kent
- Military career
- Allegiance: Great Britain
- Branch: Royal Navy
- Rank: Admiral
- Commands: Nore Command

Viceregal styles of Richard Edwards
- Reference style: His Excellency
- Spoken style: Your Excellency

Admiral Richard Edwards (c. 1715 – 3 February 1795) was a Royal Navy officer and colonial administrator who twice served as the governor of Newfoundland from 1757 to 1759 and 1779 to 1781. He also served as Commander-in-Chief, The Nore from 1788 to 1792.

== Naval career ==
Edwards was promoted to lieutenant in 1740 and to captain in 1753. He was appointed governor of Newfoundland for his first term in 1757. His main concern was defence of the colony as Great Britain and France were at war. Edwards was re-appointed governor for a second term in 1779 and was again concerned with the colony's defences – only this time against American privateers. In 1780 he formed the Newfoundland Volunteers under the command of Robert Pringle. Edwards ordered the construction of Fort Townshend (see Lord Townshend) and the Quidi Vidi batteries including those at Petty Harbour. Promoted vice-admiral in 1787, he became in Commander-in-Chief, The Nore in 1788. He was promoted to Admiral of the Blue in 1794.

== See also ==
- Governors of Newfoundland
- List of people from Newfoundland and Labrador

Political offices
Preceded by Richard Dorrill	Governor of Newfoundland; 1757–1759	Succeeded by James Webb
Preceded by John Montagu	Governor of Newfoundland; 1779–1781	Succeeded by John Campbell
Military offices
Preceded by Sir Andrew Hamond	Commander-in-Chief, The Nore; 1788–1792	Succeeded by William Locker
