= James Webb (Royal Navy officer) =

Royal Navy officer and Governor of Newfoundland

Captain James Webb
- Died: 14 May 1761
- Military career
- Allegiance: Kingdom of Great Britain
- Branch: Royal Navy
- Rank: Commodore
- Commands: HMS Jamaica; HMS Surprize

Viceregal styles of James Webb
- Reference style: His Excellency
- Spoken style: Your Excellency

James Webb (died 14 May 1761) was an officer of the Royal Navy, who served as colonial governor of Newfoundland. He was born in England, and died at Plymouth Sound.

== Naval career ==
Webb joined in the Royal Navy in 1728. Promoted to commander, he was given command of HMS Jamaica in 1745 and, having been promoted further to captain, he was given command of HMS Surprize in 1746. He became governor of Newfoundland in 1760 during the Seven Years' War. Because Webb had taken three captured Inuit to Chateau Bay, gave them gifts, and released them they in turn stimulated more regular commerce with the Labrador Inuit. Webb claimed Chateau Bay for Britain and renamed it York Harbour.

== See also ==
- Governors of Newfoundland
- List of people from Newfoundland and Labrador

== Sources ==
- Winfield, Rif (2007). British Warships in the Age of Sail, 1714–1792: Design, Construction, Careers and Fates. London: Seaforth. ISBN 978-1-84415-700-6.

Political offices
| Preceded by Richard Edwards | Governor of Newfoundland; 1760–1760 | Succeeded by Thomas Graves |
