= Richard Dorrill =

Captain Richard Dorrill
- Born: c. 1719
- Died: 1 January 1762 (aged 42–43)
- Military career
- Allegiance: Kingdom of Great Britain
- Branch: Royal Navy
- Rank: Commodore
- Commands: HMS Jamaica; HMS Penzance; HMS Royal George

Viceregal styles of Richard Dorrill
- Reference style: His Excellency
- Spoken style: Your Excellency

Richard Dorill (c. 1719 – 1 January 1762) was a naval officer and colonial governor of Newfoundland, and who died in Bath, England.

== Naval career ==
Dorill joined the Royal Navy in 1732 and was promoted to lieutenant in 1739. He served off Toulon in action against the French and Spanish in 1744. Promoted to captain he was given command of the sloop HMS Jamaica in 1746 and of the frigate HMS Penzance in 1755. He was appointed Governor of Newfoundland in May 1755. He upheld Britain's commands regarding its inhabitants and his intolerance of the Irish Catholic. He had a Roman Catholic priest arrested for officiating at mass in Harbour Grace. He went on to take command of the first-rate HMS Royal George at Deptford in 1756.

== See also ==
- Governors of Newfoundland
- List of people from Newfoundland and Labrador

Political offices
Preceded by Hugh Bonfoy	Governor of Newfoundland; 1755–1755	Succeeded by Richard Edwards
