= Treaty of Suza =

Two separate peace treaties signed in 1629

The Treaty of Susa (also sometimes spelled Suza) refers to two separate peace treaties signed in 1629 at Susa in the Duchy of Savoy (now in the Italian Piedmont, near the French border), recently occupied by France during the Thirty Years' War.

== Treaty between France and Savoy ==
This treaty, signed on 11 March 1629, after the French capture of the city, was agreed between Louis XIII and Charles Emmanuel I, Duke of Savoy. Its terms allowed French military passage through Savoy to assist in relief of the siege of Casale in the War of the Mantuan Succession, which was to be guaranteed by French occupation of Susa. The Duke was also to refrain from hostilities against the Duchy of Mantua. In return, France was to give Savoy Trino and other territory in Monferrat worth 15,000 crowns.

== Treaty between France and England and Scotland ==
This treaty, signed on 14 April 1629 ended a war between England and France that had broken out in 1627. Ratified by Charles I of England and Scotland on 11 June and Louis XIII of France on 4 July, it reconfirmed the terms of a marriage contract between Charles and Louis' sister Henriette Marie. Each party was allowed to retain territories captured during the conflict, but was obliged to return territories taken after the peace was agreed. This latter clause affected a number of territories taken in New France, including Quebec, which was surrendered by Samuel de Champlain in July 1629 to David Kirke and his brothers, three months after the peace was agreed, as well as other territories in Acadia (present-day peninsular Nova Scotia, then a Scottish colony, and Cape Breton Island). New France was not fully restored to French rule until the 1632 Treaty of Saint-Germain-en-Laye.
