= Hugh Bonfoy =

Canadian politician

Captain Hugh Bonfoy
- Born: c. 1720
- Died: 12 March 1762 (aged 41–42)
- Military career
- Allegiance: Kingdom of Great Britain
- Branch: Royal Navy
- Rank: Commodore
- Commands: HMS Augusta; HMS Berwick

Viceregal styles of Hugh Bonfoy
- Reference style: His Excellency
- Spoken style: Your Excellency

Hugh Bonfoy (c. 1720 – 12 March 1762) was a naval officer and colonial governor of Newfoundland.

== Naval career ==
Bonfoy entered the Royal Navy in 1739 and was promoted to lieutenant in 1744 and to captain in 1745. He was captain of the fourth-rate HMS Augusta and then of the third-rate HMS Berwick. He became governor of Newfoundland in 1753. The common perception on the island was the uncertainty about the loyalty of Irish Roman Catholics in Newfoundland. Bonfoy did not allow Irish Catholics to worship stating that:

"Liberty of Conscience is allowed to all Persons except Papists."

== See also ==
- Governors of Newfoundland
- List of people from Newfoundland and Labrador

Political offices
Preceded by Francis William Drake	Governor of Newfoundland; 1753–1754	Succeeded by Richard Dorrill
