= William Hill (colonial administrator) =

Proprietary Governor of the Province of Avalon in Newfoundland, now in Canada

William Hill (fl. 1630s) was the Proprietary Governor of the Province of Avalon in Newfoundland from 1634 to 1638. He was appointed to the position by Cecil Calvert, 2nd Baron Baltimore. George Calvert, 1st Baron Baltimore had founded the colony and acted as its governor and Cecil Calvert had managed the colony after his father's death but since he was occupied with the Province of Maryland appointed Hill as governor in his stead. Hill remained in the colony, living in Lord Baltimore's house, until the arrival of Sir David Kirke in 1638. Kirke had been granted a Royal Charter over all of Newfoundland and forced Hill to vacate the house and move across the harbour where he stayed until his death.
