= John Bowker (governor) =

British Naval officer and Governor of Newfoundland

Rear-Admiral Captain John Bowker

Acting Governor of Newfoundland
- In office 24 February 1818 – 19 July 1818
- Preceded by: Francis Pickmore
- Succeeded by: Sir Charles Hamilton

Personal details
- Born: 1 December 1770
- Died: 11 August 1847 (aged 76)
- Spouse: Mary Beckford
- Military career
- Allegiance: Kingdom of Great Britain; United Kingdom
- Branch: Royal Navy
- Rank: Rear-Admiral

Rear-Admiral Captain John Bowker was a British Naval officer and Governor of Newfoundland from 24 February 1818 to 19 July 1818. As a senior officer under Francis Pickmore, Bowker was appointed Governor following his death. Bowker was officially sworn in on 4 March 1818. On 3 August 1785, Bowker joined the Royal Navy.

Bowker was the Flag-Captain aboard HMS Sir Francis Drake.

On 31 July 1844, he was made Captain of Greenwich Hospital.

Political offices
Preceded by Francis Pickmore	Commodore Governor of Newfoundland; 1818–1818	Succeeded by Sir Charles Hamilton
