= Surrender of Quebec =

1629 occupation of Quebec City by the English during the Anglo-French War

- Part of the Anglo-French Wars
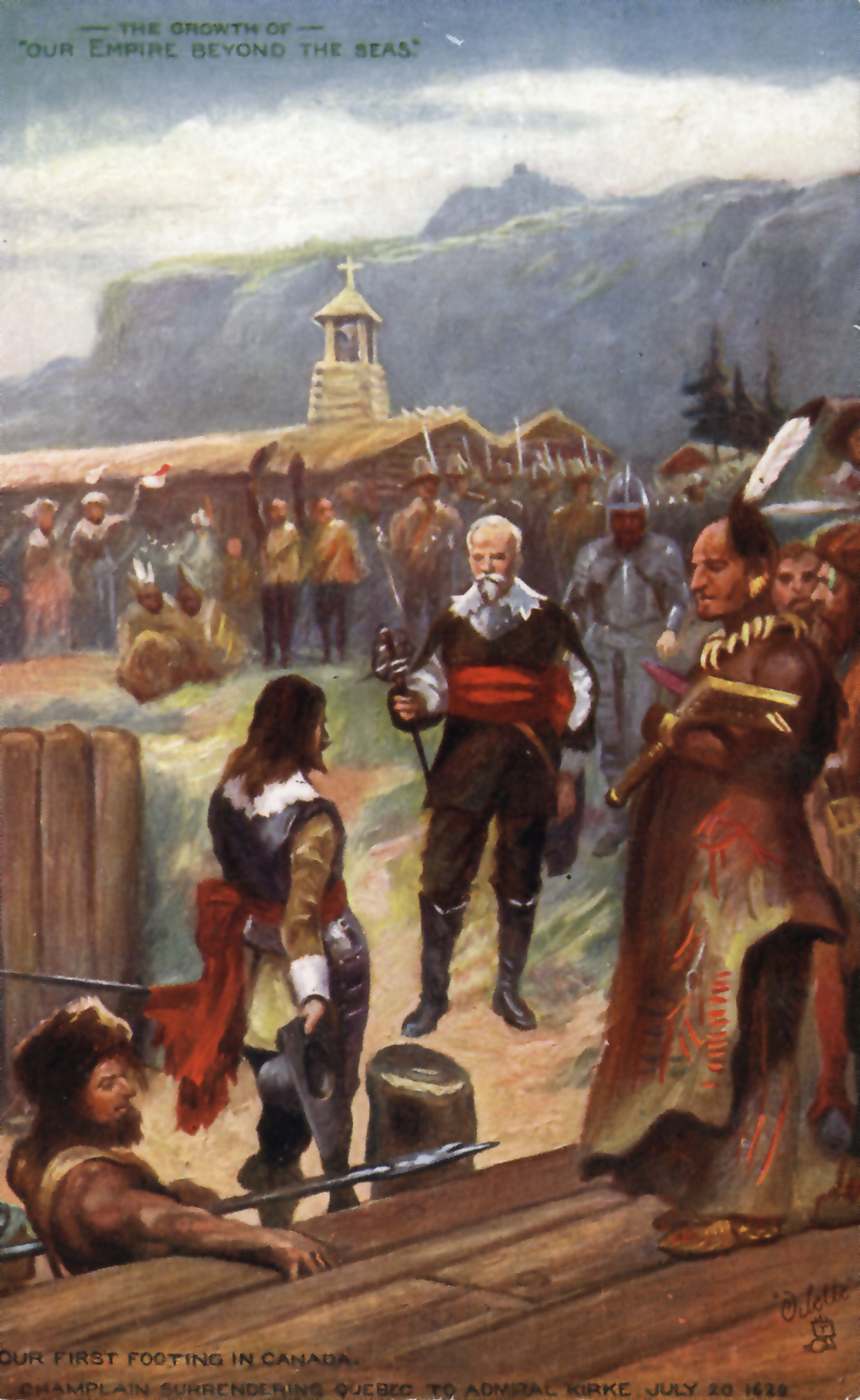
- Champlain surrendering Quebec to Admiral Kirke, July 20 1629
Date	1628–1629
Location	Saint Lawrence River and Quebec
Result	English victory: English occupation of Quebec until 1632

Belligerents
France	England

Commanders and leaders
(Kingdom of France) Samuel de Champlain (surrendered)	(Kingdom of England) David Kirke

The surrender of Quebec in 1629 was the taking of Quebec City, during the Anglo-French War (1627–1629). It was achieved without battle by English privateers led by David Kirke, who had intercepted the town's supplies.

== Background ==
It began in 1627 with David Kirke's father when several London merchants formed the Company of Adventurers to Canada to develop trade and settlement for profit on the Saint Lawrence River. Made up of private investors, it was chartered by the Crown as a means of extending English influence in exploration and colonial development. When the Anglo-French War broke out later that year, the Company financed an expedition, which was commissioned by Charles I of England, to displace the French from "Canida". The French had settlements along the Saint Lawrence River.

Accompanied by his brothers Lewis, Thomas, John, and James (sometimes recorded as Jarvis), David Kirke set off with three ships, probably in company with a fleet bringing settlers to Sir William Alexander's colonisation project at Charlesfort in Acadia.

== Campaign ==
Kirke may have stopped at Ferryland, the colony of George Calvert, 1st Baron Baltimore on the east coast of Newfoundland on the Avalon Peninsula. The Kirke expedition landed at Port Royal which they would use as a base. The force sailed up the Saint Lawrence River and occupied Tadoussac, 160 kilometres north of Quebec. Kirke promptly laid waste to the French settlement and then sailed on and did the same at Cap Tourmente.

=== Blockade of Saint Lawrence ===
Kirke set up a blockade to seize any French ships coming into the river that supplied Quebec. A supply ship was seized and Kirke sent Basque fishermen as emissaries to the leader Samuel de Champlain to demand the surrender of the fortress town. Champlain rejected the demand because he was expecting relief from France, and Kirke decided against an attack. With the onset of winter Kirke's ships turned back for England, but en route they encountered the French supply fleet of four vessels under Admiral Claude Roquemont de Brison. The English captured the French ships after a short engagement.

=== Invasion ===
An English invasion fleet, of six ships and three pinnaces, left Gravesend in March 1629 with Jacques Michel, a deserter from Champlain, to act as pilot on the St. Lawrence River. Champlain sent a party from Quebec, whose residents were on the point of starvation, to meet an expected relief fleet under Émery de Caën. Unknown to Champlain, de Caën was also bringing word that peace had been declared in April in Europe by the Treaty of Susa. Although Champlain's party met de Caën in the Gulf, they were captured by the English on their way upriver to Quebec. Kirke, now aware of the desperate conditions at Quebec, sent his brothers Lewis and Thomas to demand surrender. Having no alternative, Champlain surrendered on 19 July 1629.

== Aftermath ==
Impressed with the achievement, the Company of Adventurers applied to the Crown for letters patent to give them the sole right to trade and settle in Canada along the St. Lawrence. Sir William Alexander complained that such a patent would infringe upon the land granted to him under the Great Seal of Scotland in February 1627. The two groups compromised by joining forces; Alexander would establish an Anglo-Scottish colony at Tadoussac, holding all the land within ten leagues on both sides of the river, while the Company would have the right to free trade and use of the harbours.

However, Champlain argued that the English seizing of the lands was illegal as the war had already ended; he worked to have the lands returned to France. As part of the ongoing negotiations of their exit from the Anglo-French War, in 1632 Charles I of England agreed to return the lands in exchange for Louis XIII paying his wife's dowry. These terms were signed into law with the Treaty of Saint-Germain-en-Laye. The lands in Quebec and Acadia were returned to the French Company of One Hundred Associates, which lost 90% of its initial investment with the loss of the fleet.

As the Kirke brothers were born and raised in France, their actions were considered treason there. An effigy of the Kirke brothers was burned in Paris when the news of the French defeat reached the capital. In England, the Kirke brothers were granted a canton as an augmentation to their existing coats of arms (each properly differenced) by Clarenceux King of Arms on 1 December 1631. The design of the canton was based on the arms of the defeated Admiral Roquemont. Kirke was knighted in 1633.
