= Treaty of Saint-Germain-en-Laye (1632) =

1632 treaty in which England returned control to France of its North American colonies

- Type: Peace treaty
- Signed: 29 March 1632
- Location: Saint-Germain-en-Laye
- Signatories: England; France

The Treaty of Saint-Germain-en-Laye was signed on March 29, 1632. It returned New France (Quebec, Acadia and Cape Breton Island) to French control after the English had seized it in 1629, after the Anglo-French War (1627–1629) had ended.

On 19 July 1629, an English fleet under the command of David Kirke managed to cause the surrender of Quebec by intercepting its supplies, which effectively reduced Samuel de Champlain and his men to starvation. This action occurred following the signing of the Treaty of Suza and thus was considered illegitimate. The Treaty of Saint-Germain-en-Laye resolved this issue, returning New France to French control. It also provided France with compensation for goods seized during the capture of New France.

== See also ==
- List of treaties
