= David Kirke =

English privateer and colonial administrator (1597–1654)

Sir David Kirke
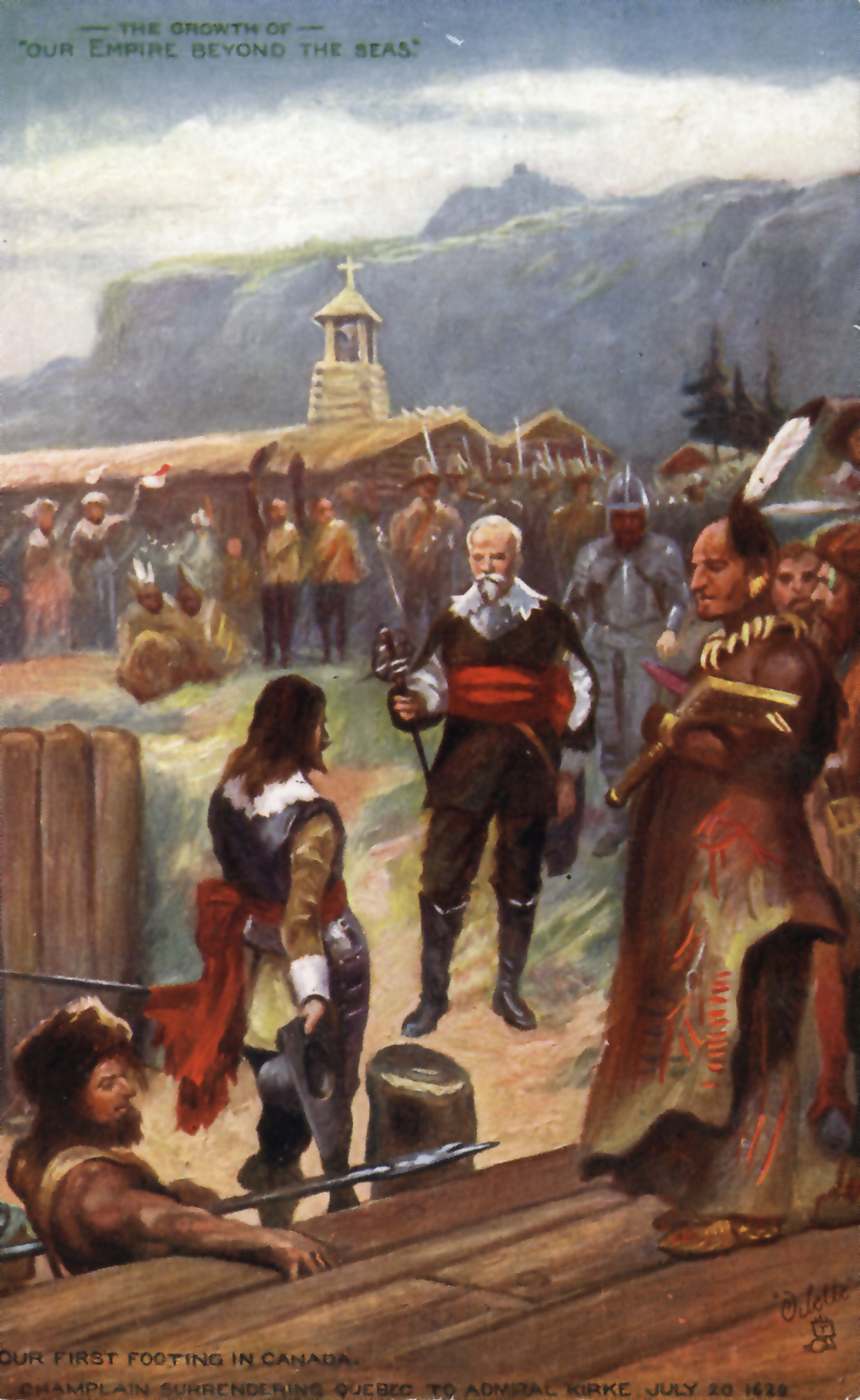
- An illustration of Kirke (left) accepting the surrender of Samuel Champlain (centre) on 20 July 1629

1st Governor of Newfoundland
- In office 1638–1651
- Preceded by: William Hill
- Succeeded by: John Treworgie

Personal details
- Born: c. 1597
- Died: c. 1654

Sir David Kirke (c. 1597 – c. 1654) was an English privateer and colonial administrator who served as the Governor of Newfoundland from 1638 to 1651. He is best known for capturing Québec from the French in 1629 during the Anglo-French War. A favourite of Charles I of England, Kirke's downfall came in 1651 when he was arrested after being accused of withholding taxes collected on behalf of the English government. Kirke was sent back to England, where he reportedly died in prison.

== Early life ==
Kirke was a son of Gervase (Jarvis) Kirke, a rich merchant of the City of London, and Elizabeth Goudon, a French Huguenot woman. He was raised in Dieppe, in Normandy. David was the eldest of five sons, followed by Lewis, Thomas, John and James.

While still in England, David married to Sara Kirke. They left for Newfoundland in 1638 and had a number of children, including their sons George, David the Younger, and Phillip.

== Quebec campaigns ==
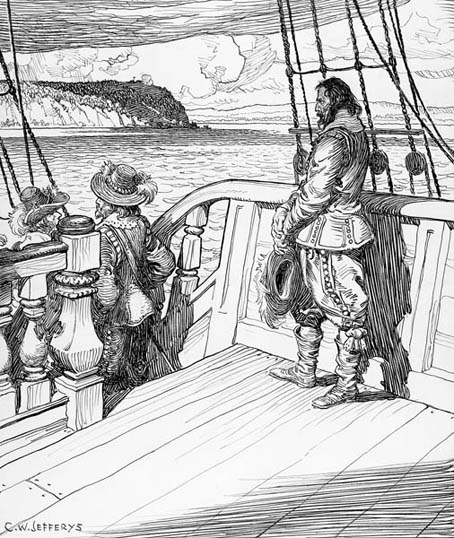
Champlain leaves Quebec as a prisoner aboard Kirke's ship, after a bloodless siege in 1629. Image by Charles William Jefferys, 1942

Following the outbreak of the Anglo-French War, a group of merchants including Kirke's father received letters of marque from Charles I, granting them permission to launch an expedition against French Canada. Kirke and his brothers served as captains on the three-ship expedition, with David captaining the expedition's flagship, the Abigail. In 1628 the fleet entered the Gulf of St Lawrence and captured Tadoussac, from where they proceeded to Quebec, which they found too heavily defended. Withdrawing up the river, they encountered a French supply fleet, which they captured. Following this victory, they returned to England.

They would return to Canada the following year; their fleet, now consisting of six warships and three pinnaces, left Gravesend, Kent in March 1629 with Jacques Michel, a deserter from Samuel Champlain, to act as pilot on the St. Lawrence River. Kirke himself was aboard the expedition's flagship, Abigail. Champlain sent a party from Quebec, whose residents were on the point of starvation, to meet an expected French relief fleet under Émery de Caen. Unknown to Champlain, Caën was also bringing word that in April peace had been declared in Europe by the Treaty of Susa. Although Champlain's party met Caën in the Gulf, they were captured by the English on their way upriver to Quebec. Kirke, now aware of the desperate conditions facing the Quebecers, sent his brothers Lewis and Thomas to demand a French surrender. Having no alternative, Champlain surrendered on 19 July 1629.

However, Champlain argued that the seizure of Quebec by the Kirkes was unlawful, as the war had already ended; and he worked to have the colony returned to France. As part of the ongoing negotiations of their exit from the Anglo-French War, in 1632 Charles I of England agreed to return the lands in exchange for Louis XIII paying his wife's dowry. These terms were signed into law with the Treaty of Saint-Germain-en-Laye of 1632. The lands in Quebec and Acadia were returned to the French Company of One Hundred Associates.

Kirke had brought to Quebec an enslaved boy born in Madagascar, and before leaving the colony in July 1632 to return to England, he sold the slave to French clerk Olivier Le Baillif, who had collaborated with the English during the occupation. Baillif purchased the slave for 50 écus, the equivalent of half a year of wages for a skilled worker, and in 1633 baptised him as Olivier Le Jeune. After returning to England, Kirke was knighted as a consolation in 1633.

== Governor of Newfoundland ==
Kirke is believed to have visited Ferryland, as he published a report on the island of Newfoundland in 1635. He was impressed by the island's fisheries, and in 1637 he asked King Charles for a land grant. In November 1637 Kirke and his partners were granted a royal charter for co-proprietorship of the entire island. A portion of Newfoundland, the Avalon Peninsula, had already been granted to George Calvert, Lord Baltimore, but he was accused of abandoning his colony before his death in 1632, and the lands were transferred to Kirke. The charter of this new grant had stipulations designed to reduce conflict with migratory fishermen; there was to be no settlement within six miles of the shore, fishing rooms were not to be occupied before the arrival of the summer fishing crews, and a five per cent tax was to be collected on all fish products taken by foreigners.

Kirke was installed as the Proprietary Governor and arrived in 1638 with one hundred colonists. The original governorship of the Avalon Peninsula had passed to Baltimore's son, Cecilius Calvert, who had installed William Hill as governor.

Kirke seized the governor's mansion, then occupied by Hill. In January 1638, the king also granted Kirke a coat of arms, "For the greater honour and splendour of that Countrey and the people therein inhabiting … to be used in all such cases as Armes are wont to be by other nations and Countries." In 1639, Kirke renamed the colony the Pool Plantation. Over the next several years, he built forts at Ferryland, St. John’s, and Bay de Verde. He collected tolls from all fishing vessels.

Kirke was granted the rights to "the sole trade of the Newfoundland, the Fishing excepted." The latter words resulted in considerable trouble. At the time the Grand Banks of Newfoundland were being fished by many European nations, and Kirke's 5% tax gave an advantage to the English fishermen in the area. A number of West Country merchants thrived on the fish trade. Represented in London by Kirke, Barkeley, and Company, with several of his brothers in control, Kirke used his land rights to support the fish trade, in conflict with the terms of his charter. By 1638, strong links between Ferryland and Dartmouth, Devon, had already been established. Kirke brought the entire trade network south of St. John's under the control of a growing family commercial empire.

These actions aroused strong animosity from the West Country merchants. The planters and migratory fishermen agreed that Kirke was reserving the best fishing rooms for himself and his friends. In addition, he was accused of opening taverns, which were disruptive to the settlers' work. But before these charges could be investigated, in 1642 the English Civil War broke out between the king and parliament.

== Arrest and death ==
The Civil War ended in 1651, and the Kirkes, as royalists, were on the losing side. Although the merchants' complaints were put aside during the war, they were revived at the end of it, and the Kirkes were no longer protected by the crown.

In 1651 a team of six commissioners, led by Maryland merchant John Treworgie, was sent to Ferryland to seize Kirke and bring him to England to stand trial. His lands were acquired by the Commonwealth of England. Found not guilty, in 1653 Kirke re-purchased the title to his lands. His wife, Dame Sara Kirke, returned to Newfoundland to oversee his business and reclaim his property, but Cecil Calvert, Lord Baltimore, brought new charges against Kirke over the title of the lands around Ferryland. Kirke is thought to have died in the original Southwark jail, The Clink, as early as January 1654, while awaiting trial.

Treworgie was granted the governorship of Newfoundland in 1653; he was already in Ferryland, apparently never having left after 1651. The next year, he and two other commissioners were arrested by James Kirke for holding possession of lands rightfully owned by the Kirkes, and an unpaid debt of £1,100. Treworgie maintained that Kirke's possessions had been returned to his wife, but was found guilty in a first trial. A personal plea to Cromwell resulted in a second trial. The outcome is lost, but it appears that Treworgie was found not guilty, as he continued to serve as governor until 1660. In 1660, Treworgie returned to England to ask for another term as governor and for six year's salary he claimed he was owed. He never returned to Newfoundland.

== Aftermath ==
After David's death, Lady Sara Kirke and her sons took control over the Pool Plantation for the next decades.

The restoration of the Stuart monarchy in 1660 re-opened the debate between the Kirkes and the Calverts over the ownership of the Avalon Peninsula. This time, Cecil Calvert was successful in gaining the royal patent on Avalon, but he never took up residence. David Kirke's brother, now Sir Lewis Kirke, demanded compensation for improvements made at Ferryland by the Kirkes. Lady Kirke petitioned Charles II to make Lewis's nephew George Kirke the governor of Newfoundland, an arrangement suggested by the Newfoundlanders, but the king demurred from appointing a resident governor.

The grant of arms to Kirke was lost during the Civil War. During the aftermath of World War I, the Imperial War Graves Commission in Europe asked what arms should mark the graves of soldiers from Newfoundland. During the subsequent investigations, the Kirke arms were found in the College of Heralds. In 1928, they were adopted as the official coat of arms of Newfoundland and continue to be used today by the province of Newfoundland and Labrador.

Preceded by: William Hill	Governor of Newfoundland; 1638–1651	Followed by: John Treworgie
