= Anglo-French War (1627–1629) =

War between England and France from 1627 to 1629

Anglo-French War of 1627–1629
- Part of the Thirty Years' War
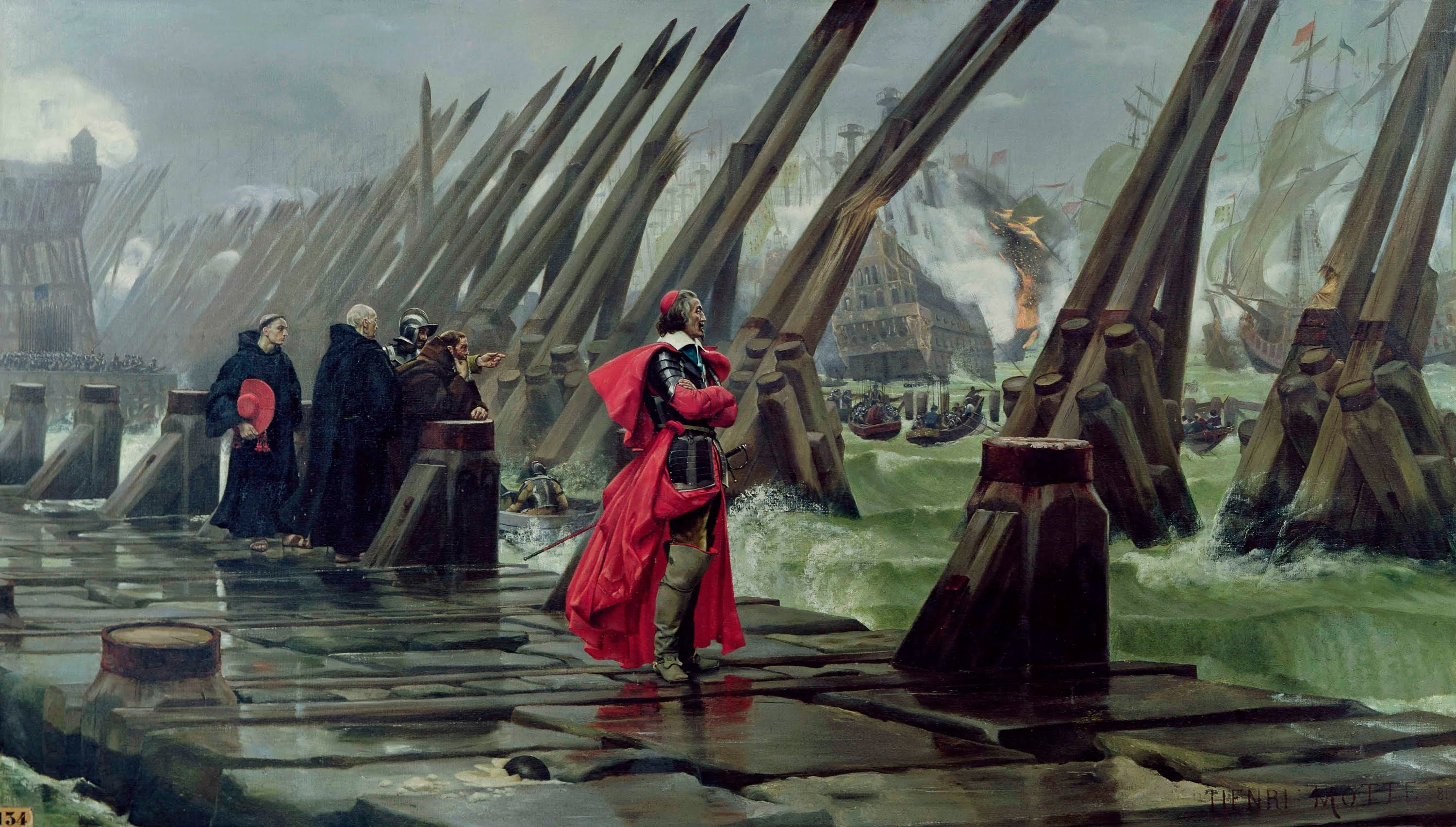
- The Cardinal de Richelieu at the siege of La Rochelle
Date	1627–1629
Location	West coast of France and New France
Result	Status quo ante bellum: Treaty of Suza; Treaty of Saint-Germain-en-Laye

Belligerents
England; Scotland; Huguenots; Dutch Republic: Haudenosaunee; Mohawk; Susquehannock	France; Spanish Empire; Mi'kmaq; Abenakis; Innu; Wendat

Commanders and leaders
(Kingdom of England) (Kingdom of Scotland) Charles I (Kingdom of England) Duke of Buckingham (Kingdom of England) David Kirke	(Kingdom of France) Cardinal Richelieu (Kingdom of France) Samuel de Champlain (surrendered)

The Anglo-French War of 1627–1629 (French: Guerre franco-anglaise) was a military conflict fought between the Kingdom of France and the Kingdom of England between 1627 and 1629. It involved mainly actions at sea. The centrepiece of the conflict was the siege of La Rochelle (1627–1628) in which the English Crown supported the French Huguenots in their fight against the French royal forces of Louis XIII. La Rochelle had become the stronghold of the French Huguenots and was under their own governance. It was the centre of Huguenot seapower and the strongest centre of resistance against the central government.

The English also launched a campaign against France's new colony in North America, which led to the capture of Quebec.

== Background ==
The conflict followed the failure of the Anglo-French alliance of 1624 in which England had tried to find an ally in France against the power of the House of Habsburg. French politics evolved otherwise, however, as Cardinal Richelieu came to power in 1624. In 1625, Richelieu used English warships to vanquish the Huguenots at the Recovery of Ré island (1625), triggering outrage in England.

In 1626, France concluded a secret peace with Spain, and disputes arose around Henrietta Maria's household. Furthermore, France began building up its navy, leading the English to be convinced that France must be opposed "for reasons of state".

In June 1626, Walter Montagu was sent to France to contact dissident noblemen and from March 1627 started to organize a French rebellion in La Rochelle. The plan was to send an English fleet to encourage rebellion, as a new Huguenot revolt by Henri, Duke of Rohan and his brother Soubise was being triggered.

== War ==
=== Ile de Ré expedition ===
Charles I sent his favourite, George Villiers, 1st Duke of Buckingham, with a fleet of 80 ships. In June 1627 Buckingham organised a landing on the nearby island of Île de Ré with 6,000 men to help the Huguenots. Although a Protestant stronghold, Île de Ré had not directly joined the rebellion against the king. On Île de Ré, the English under Buckingham tried to take the fortified city of Saint-Martin-de-Ré but were repulsed after three months. Small French royal boats managed to supply Saint-Martin in spite of the English blockade. Buckingham ultimately ran out of money and support, and his army was weakened by diseases. After a last attack on Saint-Martin, the English were repulsed with heavy casualties and left with their ships.

=== La Rochelle expedition ===
England attempted to send two more fleets to relieve La Rochelle. The first one, led by William Feilding, 1st Earl of Denbigh, left in April 1628 but returned without a fight to Portsmouth, as he "said that he had no commission to hazard the king's ship in a fight and returned shamefully to Portsmouth". On the way home to England, Denbigh's fleet of 16 ships encountered a French squadron off Cherbourg on 11 June 1628 (21 June N.S.). In the action, Denbigh lost three ships burnt and four ships captured by the French. A second fleet, organised by Buckingham just before his assassination, was dispatched under the Admiral of the Fleet, Robert Bertie, 1st Earl of Lindsey, in August 1628, consisting of 29 warships and 31 merchantmen.

In September 1628, the English fleet tried to relieve the city. After bombarding French positions and attempting to force the sea wall, the English fleet had to withdraw. Following this last disappointment, the city surrendered on October 28, 1628.

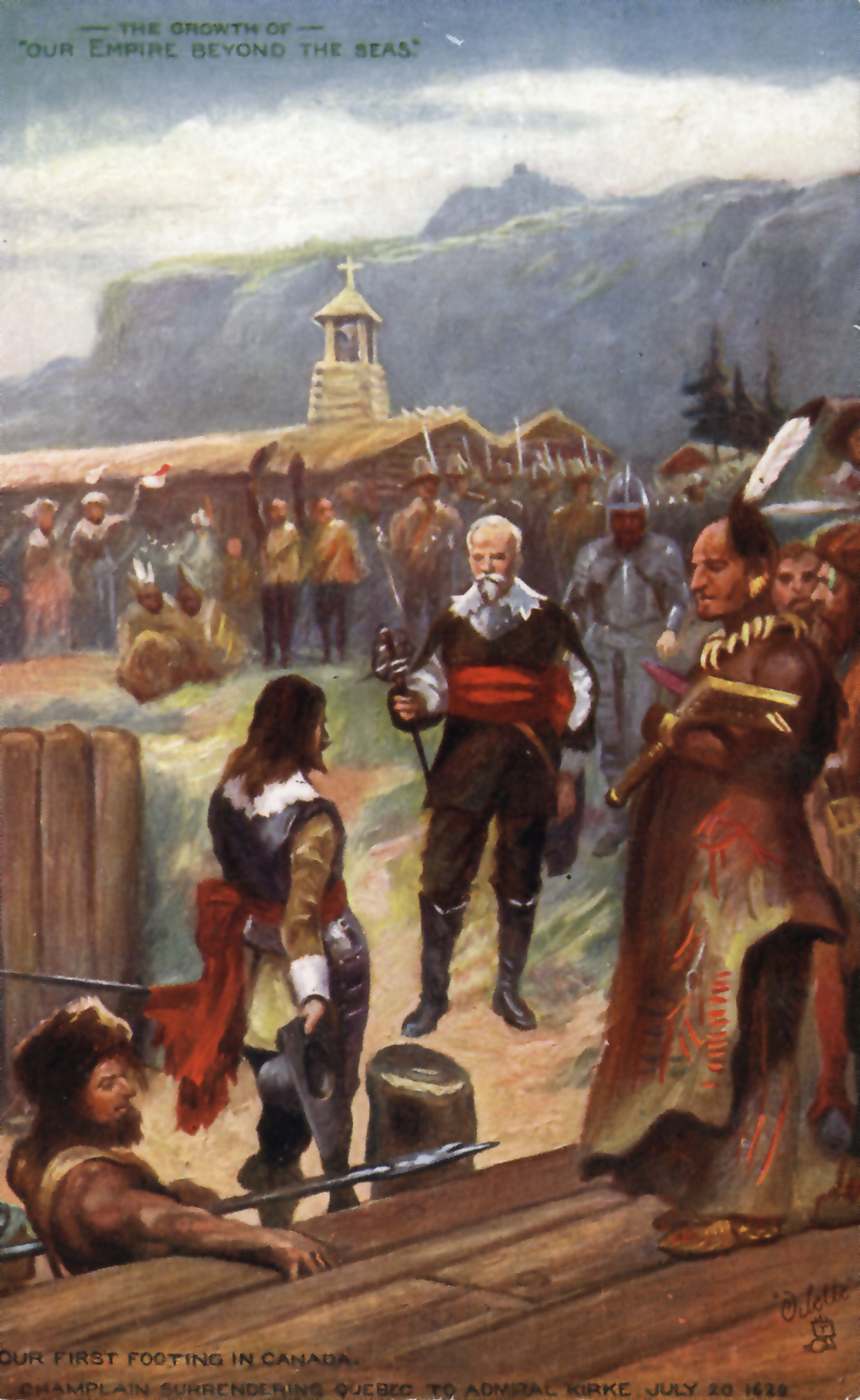
Champlain surrendering Quebec to David Kirke, July 20, 1629

=== New France expedition ===
An English force, led by David Kirke, launched a campaign against New France in 1628 with the target being the French colony of Quebec. under the command of Samuel de Champlain. The force sailed up the Saint Lawrence River and occupied Tadoussac and Cap Tourmente. Kirke promptly laid waste to the French settlements and then blockaded the Saint Lawrence. The English succeeded in capturing a supply convoy bound for New France, which severely impaired that colony's ability to resist attack. Winter forced the Kirke brothers to return to England, where King Charles I, on hearing of the successes, increased the number of Kirke's fleet to return in the spring. Champlain, whose residents were on the point of starvation, was hoping for a relief fleet to arrive. The fleet was intercepted and captured by the English on their way upriver to Quebec. Kirke, now aware of the desperate conditions in Quebec, demanded its surrender; having no alternative, Champlain surrendered on 19 July 1629. The English occupied the colony with Kirke as governor.

== Peace ==
With the Peace of Alès in April 1629, which settled concessions to the defeated Huguenots, Richelieu's first step was to end hostilities with England to try to break the Hapsburg encirclement of France. England and France thus negotiated a peace at the Treaty of Susa, which saw no benefits to each other and amounted to little more than a return to the status quo ante bellum.

With regards to New France, much of this side of the conflict had spilled over after the Treaty of Susa had been signed. In 1632, Charles I agreed to return the lands in exchange for Louis XIII agreeing to paying Charles' wife's dowry. Those terms were signed into law with the Treaty of Saint-Germain-en-Laye. The lands in Quebec and Acadia were returned to the French Company of One Hundred Associates.

A peace treaty was also signed with Spain in 1630; England's disengagement from European affairs dismayed Protestant forces on the continent. In England, internal conflict continued between the monarchy and Parliament, which would lead to the English Civil Wars of the 1640s. France, however, continued to grow more powerful, with its navy becoming even larger than that of England by 1630.
