= John Slany =

English merchant and ship builder

John Slany, Slaney or Slanie, etc. (died 1632), was an English merchant and ship builder of Shropshire origins who became Master of the Merchant Taylor's Company in 1620, and was the first and only Treasurer (principal officer) of the Newfoundland Company, chartered in 1610.

== Family background ==
The Slaney family, long established in Shropshire, flourished during the later 16th century, when (Sir) Stephen Slaney (1524-1608), citizen and Skinner of London and Merchant Adventurer, became four times Master of the Worshipful Company of Skinners, and rose to be Lord Mayor of London in 1595-1596. Stephen was a son of John Slaney of Mitton, Penkridge, in Staffordshire, and grandson of Ralph Slaney of Yardley, Warwickshire. Stephen had brothers, of whom William died before 1598, and Henry survived after 1608. He is also credited with a brother John, and another named Humphrey is mentioned by Burke.

John Slaney was born (possibly during the 1560s) at Barrow, Shropshire, near to where the family held a farm estate called "The Hem" at Linley, south of Broseley. There were three brothers, Richard, John and Humphrey, and several sisters: from the wills of Richard and John, and other evidences, it seems clear they were nephews of Sir Stephen Slaney, but from which of his brothers they were the sons is not certain. Richard Slaney, gent., was in possession of "The Hem" at his death in 1620, and had several children: his sons Richard and John were London merchants. Richard's brothers John and Humphrey joined the family mercantile enterprise, John becoming free of the Merchant Taylors and Humphrey of the Worshipful Company of Haberdashers.

== Career ==
John Slaney was presented to the Merchant Taylors by William Atkins on 1 December 1593, and was married on 15 January 1593/94, at St Martin Pomary, Ironmonger Lane in the City of London, to Margery Brodgat. Margery was probably a near kinswoman of Alderman Richard Brodgate, Skinner (died 1589), the first husband of Sir Stephen's daughter Mary Slaney (who afterwards married Sir Humphrey Weld). John and Margery had two sons, John (baptized 14 February, buried 15 February 1594/95) and Thomas (baptized 11 April, buried 12 April 1596), and a daughter Mary (baptized 7 June 1597), before Margery succumbed and was buried at St Martin Pomary in July 1597. In his will of 1632 John asked to be buried in that church near where his wife and two sons were lying. On 24 March 1597/98, he remarried at St Olave's Church, Hart Street, to Elizabeth, widow of Erasmus Harbye, Skinner, of St Michael's, Cornhill.

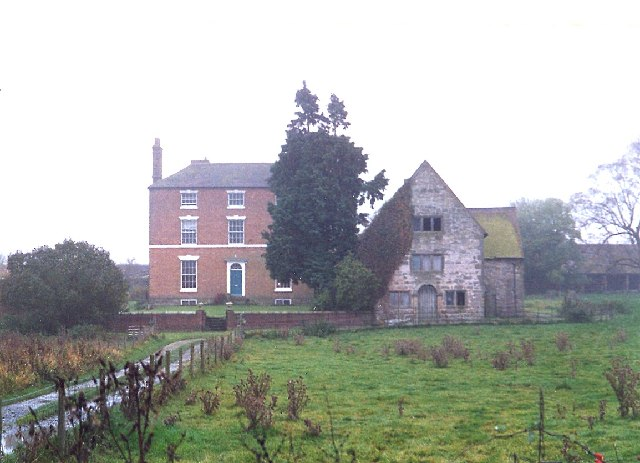
Marsh manor (right) at Barrow, owned by John Slany 1600-1620. Photo: Humphrey Bolton

In 1598 John was in partnership with Sir Stephen Slaney and his son Jasper Slaney. Through Humphrey Slaney, Jasper's agent and factor at Middelburg, they had arranged to ship large quantities of corn and rye from Zeeland to London on behalf of their kinsman Thomas Offley of London, who brought a suit against them for detention. By the end of 1598 Jasper Slaney had died, and Humphrey was appointed administrator of Jasper's estate. John, however, prospered, and in 1600 he purchased the manor called Marsh in his birth village of Barrow from Anne Hadnall and her husband Hampden Powlett.

In May 1601 Humphrey Slaney married Joan Weld, daughter of Sir Humphrey's brother John Weld, Haberdasher (died 1588). Some (at least) of Humphrey Slaney's children were christened and/or buried at St Martin Pomary between 1605 and 1616, and his wife Joan was buried there on 3 February 1630/31. Although John Slaney was more conservative than his brother (who became a most audacious merchant engaged in trade to Spain, the Levant, Barbary and Guinea), John also invested in the East India Company. His wealth was evidently considerable. By 1605 Sir Percival Willoughby, whose inheritance of Wollaton Hall in Nottinghamshire placed him heavily in debt, had mortgaged his manor of Bore Place at Chiddingstone, near Sevenoaks, Kent, to John Slany.

In 1605 John Slaney held the lease of a hall on the north side of Cornhill, between Bishopsgate Street and Finch Lane (in the City of London), and standing at the north end of Newman's Court. This adjoined the south-west corner of the Merchant Taylors' Hall premises (which fronted onto Threadneedle Street), and on its north side a small garden intersected awkwardly with their buildings. The Company had entered into a sub-lease with Slaney to extend, or "jet", their upper room called "The King's Chamber" over part of his garden, and for many years they negotiated with him to make it a freehold. In 1608 Sir Stephen Slaney died, his will (written in 1598) making John Slaney (son of his brother Henry) his heir male. His widow Dame Margaret, making her will in 1612, named both John and Humphrey Slaney among her overseers. Sir Humphrey Weld died in 1610, remembering his son John Weld (gent.) and his nephew John Weld (Esq), and leaving a garden at Moorfields to his niece Joan Slaney.

== Newfoundland Company ==
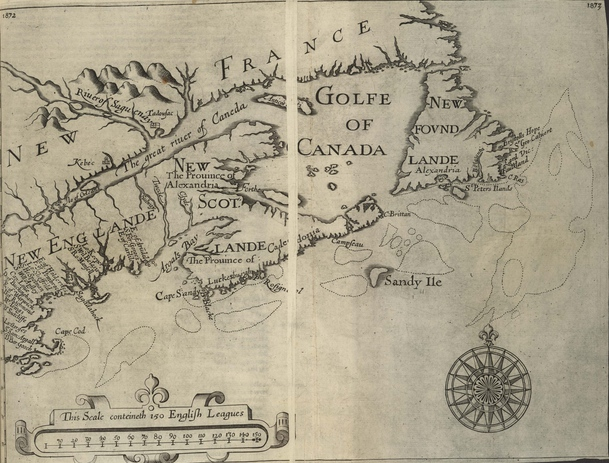
Map of New England and Newfoundland, 1625, from Purchas.

In 1608 the Mayor of Bristol considered a letter from Chief Justice Popham concerning the colonization of Newfoundland, which had become a British possession formally in 1583. John Guy, a leading merchant and common councilman of Bristol, having reformed the Bristol Society of Merchant Venturers, made a preliminary voyage to Newfoundland in that year and in 1609 he published a treatise to promote an English plantation there. Issued in response to a petition by John Guy and John Slany to the Privy Council, the charter of incorporation granted by James I in April 1610 to the "Treasurer and Company of Adventurers and Planters of the City of London and Bristol for the Colony of Plantation in Newfound Land", granted to Henry, Earl of Northampton and others, named only 8 Bristol charter members but almost 40 from London. Of these the inner council of 12 were headed by Sir Percival Willoughby, and included among them Ralph Freeman, both John and Humphrey Slaney, and both John Weld, Esq. and John Weld, Gent. John Slaney himself, who presumably drew in some of these, was named as Treasurer, with power to summon the Council, and so became the centre-pin of the London base of the Company.

A plantation company led by John Guy was, accordingly fitted out by the Company and arrived in Newfoundland in May 1610. Having chosen the site of Cuper's Cove, they spent the first winter building houses, stores, boats, and making other arrangements for the permanent continuation of the settlement. In May 1611, Guy (as governor of the colony) wrote a long account of their experiences and achievements to John Slany and the Council in London. Guy returned to England leaving Master William Colston in charge, but went back for a project of exploration in June 1612, when he established connections with the native inhabitants and made a full record of their meetings, preserved in a letter of July 1612. Their relations were, however, disrupted by the assaults of the pirate Peter Easton, further details of which were described by Sir Richard Whitbourne. Reports of mineral resources in Newfoundland encouraged Sir Percival Willoughby, whose industrial interests lay in mining, to establish ownership of a tract of land near the colony.

Tisquantum

During 1614/15 an expedition led by John Smith along the coast of Maine and Massachusetts Bay was left in charge of Thomas Hunt, who decided to augment his profits with some human traffic. Twenty captive Native Americans, including among them Tisquantum (also known as "Squanto"), of the Patuxet people, were taken to be sold into slavery in Málaga in Spain. Tisquantum however escaped and made his way to England, where he lived "a good time" apparently as a free man, worked with John Slaney at the Cornhill, and learned some English. The capture of some local inhabitants in Newfoundland, with a view to keeping them well and teaching them English ("that you may after obtayne a safe and free commerce with them"), had been an original instruction of the Newfoundland Company to John Guy. After a stay of years in London, Tisquantum went, or was taken, to Cuper's Cove as an interpreter, where his knowledge of North American natural resources was also exploited. John Guy, meanwhile, drew away from the Newfoundland project, coming into disagreement with John Slaney, who accused him of deceiving the Company over the mineral resources and predicted the failure of the colony.

== Projects ==
John Slaney is said to have joined the livery of the Merchant Taylors in 1598, a contemporary of prominent city merchants William Greenwell and Richard Oteway, all three having been Yeomanry Wardens in 1596. The elder figures of Sir Stephen Slaney and Sir Humphrey Weld died in 1609 and 1610 respectively. Becoming a Livery Assistant in 1612, John was named a charter member and one of the original twenty-four Assistants of the Society, in the 1613 Charter of King James I to the Society for the Plantation of Ulster (a consortium of livery companies), in which Merchant Taylors Robert Jenkinson, John Gore and Mathias Springer (and William Freeman, Haberdasher) were also among those named, and from whose number Mathias Springham was chosen to accompany Alderman George Smith to survey the province in 1613.

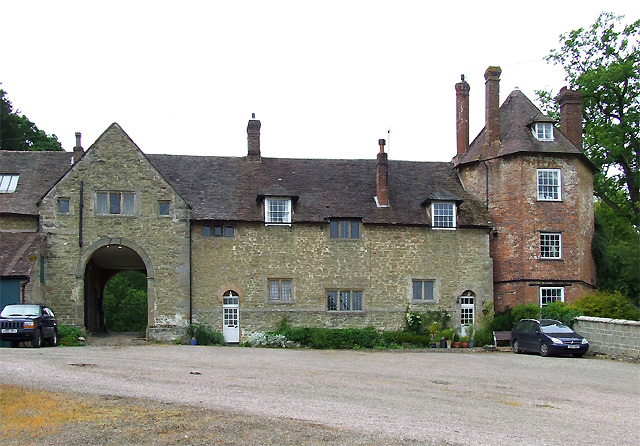
Surviving domestic range of the now-demolished Weld establishment at Willey.

In 1613 John Weld (Esq) (brother of Humphrey Slaney's wife) purchased the office of Town Clerk of London (holding it first until 1642, the year of his knighthood), and in June 1616 he bought the manor and estate of Willey, Shropshire, adjacent to Barrow, from Sir Francis, son of Roland Lacon of Kinlet for £7000. He rapidly developed his mineral interests there with coal mining, pits and furnaces, and completed his conveyance in 1618. In February 1619/20 he bought the manor of Marsh from John Slaney, and granted or sold him an annuity of £30 out of the manor of Willey, and also acquired certain farms in Barrow from Humphrey Slaney.

Several of Humphrey's children had been christened (and some buried) at St Martin Pomary during the previous years, including Elizabeth (1605/06), Jane (1606/07-1607/08), Humphrey (1611), Hanna (1612), Thomas (1615-1615/16) and Giles (December 1616). The deaths of Sir Humphrey Weld's daughter Joan Brooke in 1618, and of Dame Margaret Slaney in 1619, made way for Dame Mary Weld (daughter of Sir Stephen Slaney) to arrange her niece Elizabeth Slaney's marriage to Sir Robert Brooke in Suffolk. The families became interwoven. In April 1621 Humphrey Slaney's eldest daughter Dorothy was married to William Clobery of St Martin Pomary, drawing together a business relationship between the two men.

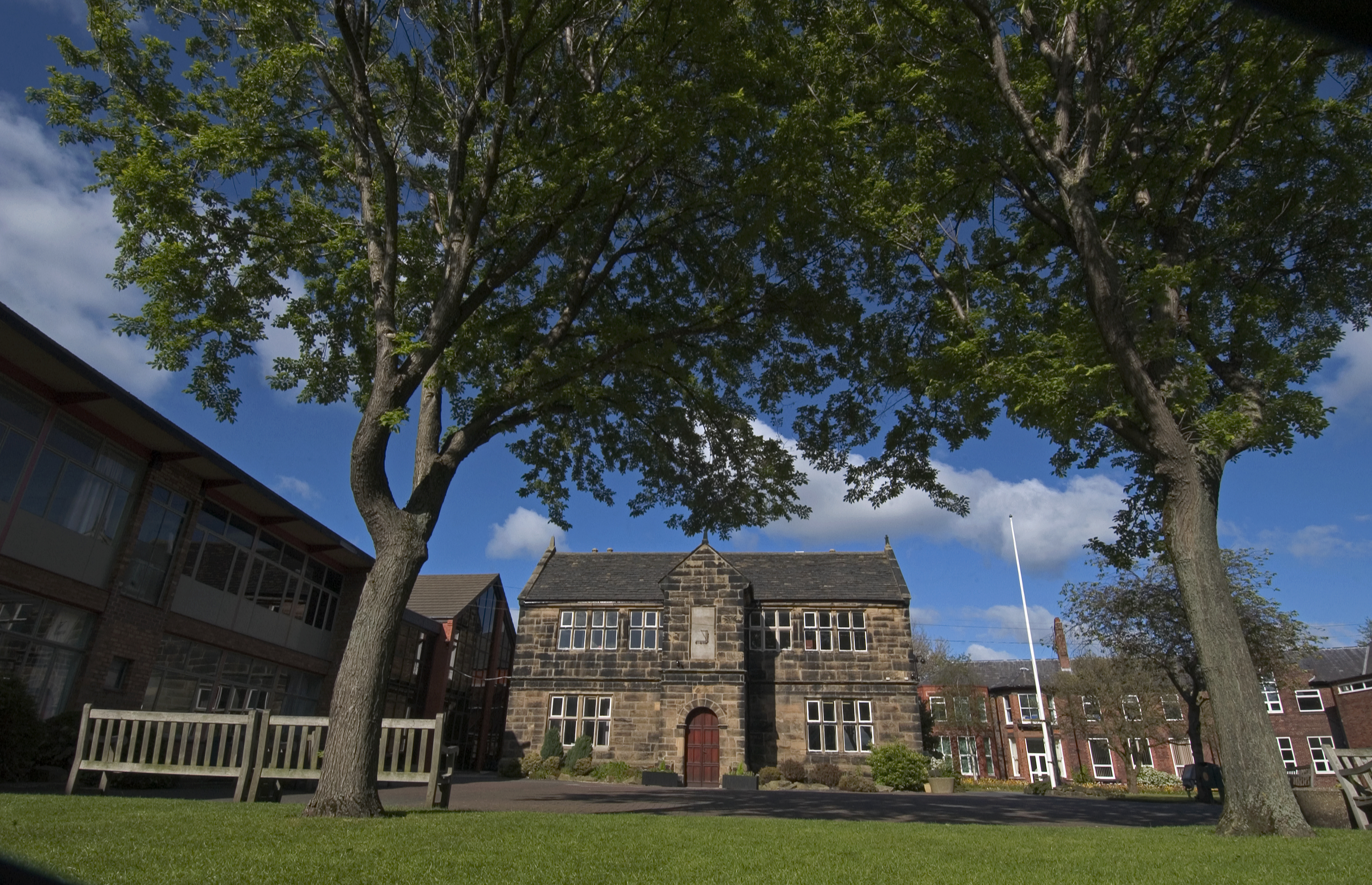
The Great Crosby school building of 1620

Slaney served with William Greenwell as a Company Warden in 1614-1615 (maistry of Randolph Wooley), and then with Thomas Franklyn (as First and Second Wardens) in 1617-1618 (in the maistry of Mathias Springham). In 1618, John Slany built almshouses at Barrow for six poor men and women, "ancient dwellers therebouts", and a free school nearby in the same parish for the free teaching of twenty poor men's children. He appointed six acres of ground surrounding them to be gardens and orchards for their easement. Among other benefits which were added to them in his will of 1632, Slany gave to the almsfolk a new black frieze gown every two years at Hallowtide and a wainload of coals each year. The school continues to grow and flourish.

In 1619-1620 John Slaney succeeded William Greenwell as Master of the Company. It therefore fell to him, as Master, to receive the bequests of John Harrison, which included £500 towards the project of completing the Merchant Taylors' School at Great Crosby, and to negotiate with Sir Richard Molyneux (1st bart.) over the continuing work. The original building survives on what is now the site of the Merchant Taylors' Girls' School. At the same time, repairs were undertaken to the Company's Hall in the City. In September 1619 it was agreed that the white walls should now be "wainscoted with good wainscot soe high as the clothes [i.e. cloth hangings] doe usually hang." In August 1620 the eight joiners responsible for this work, who were paid £188.15s.04d for it, asked for a further benevolence because "they had made the wainscotting thicker, and the frieze in a more curious and costly manner than they were bound unto": Master Slaney so informing the Council, it was agreed to pay them a further £11.04s.08d on condition that the benches be levelled up, and the Master to make the payment.
