= Bartholomew Pearson =

Bartholomew Pearson (fl. 1612 – 1632) yeoman, settler, born in Wollaton, Nottingham, England was one of the group of English settlers of John Guy's colony at Cuper's Cove, Newfoundland who had arrived in 1612, two years after the colony was established.

== Mission to the colony ==
Pearson was most likely sent by Percival Willoughby to access the agricultural potential of the colony and surroundings. He had found little in the way of establishing a farming business but he did collect much information on the wildlife. Pearson had taken part in John Guy's expedition to Trinity Bay to find and make friends with the Beothuk.

=== Shipwreck ===
On their return trip, the boat was shipwrecked at Bay de Verde. The survivors were forced to walk to Carbonear where they found a boat and finally returned to Cuper's Cove.

== Personal life ==
Pearson had requested of Willoughby his dismissal from the colony, and returned to England in 1613. He married Elizabeth Baguleughe in 1617.
