= Thomas Rowley (settler) =

Thomas Rowley (fl. 1612 – 1628), explorer and pioneer, born Shropshire, England, was one of the first settlers of John Guy's colony at Cuper's Cove, Conception Bay, Newfoundland, Canada. Rowley had accompanied John Guy on his expedition to Trinity Bay from Cuper's Cove in search of the Beothuk to make friendly relations with them for trade.

In 1618 or 1619 both Rowley and William Hannam had entered into a partnership with Sir Percival Willoughby by accepting a grant to half his land as described from a line drawn from Carbonear to Heart's Content to include all land north of that line in exchange for development separate from the Cuper's Cove Colony. Disagreements with Hannam had delayed this plan but he did convince eight settlers from Cuper's Cove to settle Heart's Content in the winter of 1619. Then in 1620 he had abandoned the venture with Percival Willoughby citing he had not received legal title to the land.

Rowley has been remembered in a poem by Robert Hayman, governor of the Bristol plantation, when he wrote;

my good friend Master Thomas Rowley who from the first plantation hath liv’d in Newfound-land, little to his profit.
