= Thomas Willoughby (disambiguation) =

Thomas Willoughby (1593–?) was a North American colonist.

Thomas Willoughby may also refer to:

- Thomas Willoughby (MP for Downton) (died before 1596), MP for Downton (UK Parliament constituency)
- Thomas Willoughby (MP for Lincolnshire) (died 1418), MP for Lincolnshire (UK Parliament constituency)
- Thomas Willoughby (MP) (1694–1742), English politician
- Thomas Willoughby, 1st Baron Middleton (1672–1729), English politician
- Thomas Willoughby, 4th Baron Middleton (1728–1781), English nobleman
- Thomas Willoughby, 11th Baron Willoughby of Parham (1602–1691/92), English peer
- Thomas Willoughby (Virginia), settler in 1610
- Tom Willoughby (1889–1964), Australian rules footballer
