= Thomas Willoughby =

Thomas Willoughby (born 1593) colonist, born Wollaton, Nottingham, England was one of the first settlers in John Guy's colony at Cuper's Cove, Newfoundland, Canada. Willoughby is the third-eldest child of Bridget and Percival Willoughby.

Willoughby, a noted black sheep of the family, was sent, along with his guardian Henry Crout, to Cuper's Cove to mend his ways and help in establishing his father's land ownership on the Bay de Verde Peninsula. He landed at Renews in 1612 before proceeding to Cuper's Cove. Willoughby had taken part in the exploration of the territory around the peninsula and took part in the fishery and was allowed to return to England in 1613. The winter prior to his departure back to England he tried to make amends for his troublesome ways in a letter to his family, where he stated:

indever [my] selfe in all goodnesse, that I hope in time you may live to se[e] mee become a newe man.
