= Francis Tanfield =

Sir Francis Tanfield (born c. 1565, date of death unknown) was Proprietary governor of the South Falkland colony (in present-day Newfoundland and Labrador, Canada) of Henry Cary, 1st Viscount Falkland, his cousin's husband. Tanfield was to establish a colony at Renews and left England in 1623 with an unknown number of colonists. The settlers were harassed by migratory fishermen who used the harbour. He was the leader of the colony of South Falkland from 1623 to 1625. The colony was still in existence in 1626 when it was visited by Sir Richard Whitbourne but the settlers likely returned to England shortly afterwards. By 1630, Tanfield was back in England about to embark to Ireland on a mission for King Charles I.

The most probable identification of Tanfield is that he was the son of Clement Tanfield and his wife, Anne, of Gayton, Northamptonshire, born 1565. He was knighted in July 1603 and, in September, accompanied the new ambassador, Lord Spencer, to the court of the Duke of Württemberg, Frederick I, who was duke over what is now part of Germany.
