= John Whitson =

English Politician

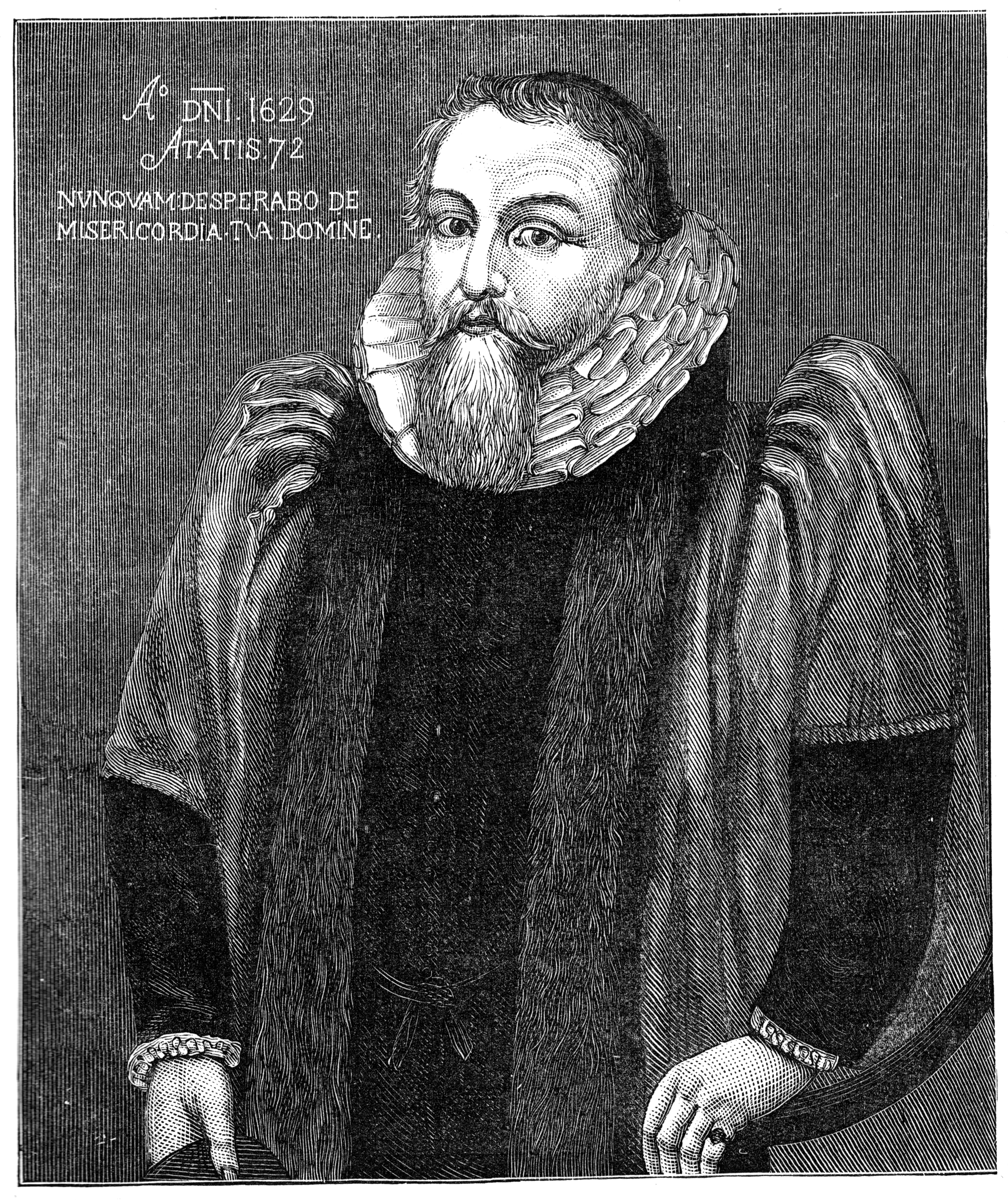
John Whitson

John Whitson (c. 1558 – 1629) was an English merchant and politician who sat in the House of Commons at various times between 1605 and 1626. He also founded The Red Maid's School.

== Life ==
Whitson grew up in Clearwell in the Forest of Dean, and came to Bristol to start his career. Apprenticed to Nicholas Cutt, a member of the Society of Merchant Venturers in 1570, he lived in a house on Corn Street. Cutt died in 1582, and it is presumed Whitson continued to work for his widow, Bridget, whom he married in 1585. They had their first child 8 months later. Following the wedding, John Whitson became a wealthy merchant in his own right.

Whitson was a merchant and alderman of Bristol. He was Sheriff in 1589 and became Lord Mayor of Bristol for the first time in 1603. Whitson had shares in two ships, the Maryflower and the Seabrake (which would later give their names to houses at The Red Maids' School), that brought home enemy prizes in the 1590s. Whitson decided that the prize cargo had belonged to poor sailors attempting to supplement their income with extra trade, so rather than stealing from the poor, he sold his share of the prize and gave the money to the almshouses of Bristol. In 1605, he was elected Member of Parliament for Bristol in a by-election to replace Sir George Snigge who was raised to the Bench.

During this time, Whitson also helped to re-establish and govern the Society of Merchant Venturers which had become moribund in the later sixteenth century. Whitson’s first wife died in 1608 and he remarried within the year to Magdalen Hynde, the widow of a London merchant, William Hynde. He was re-elected MP for Bristol in 1614 and he was Mayor of Bristol in 1616. Whitson married his third wife (and third widow), Rachel Aubrey, in 1617, she outlived him. In 1621 he was re-elected MP for Bristol. He was elected MP for Bristol again in 1625 and 1626. In 1627 he gave a charity of £500 to be divided between five young men being "meer merchants", and an unspecified number of handicraft tradesmen and freemen of Bristol.

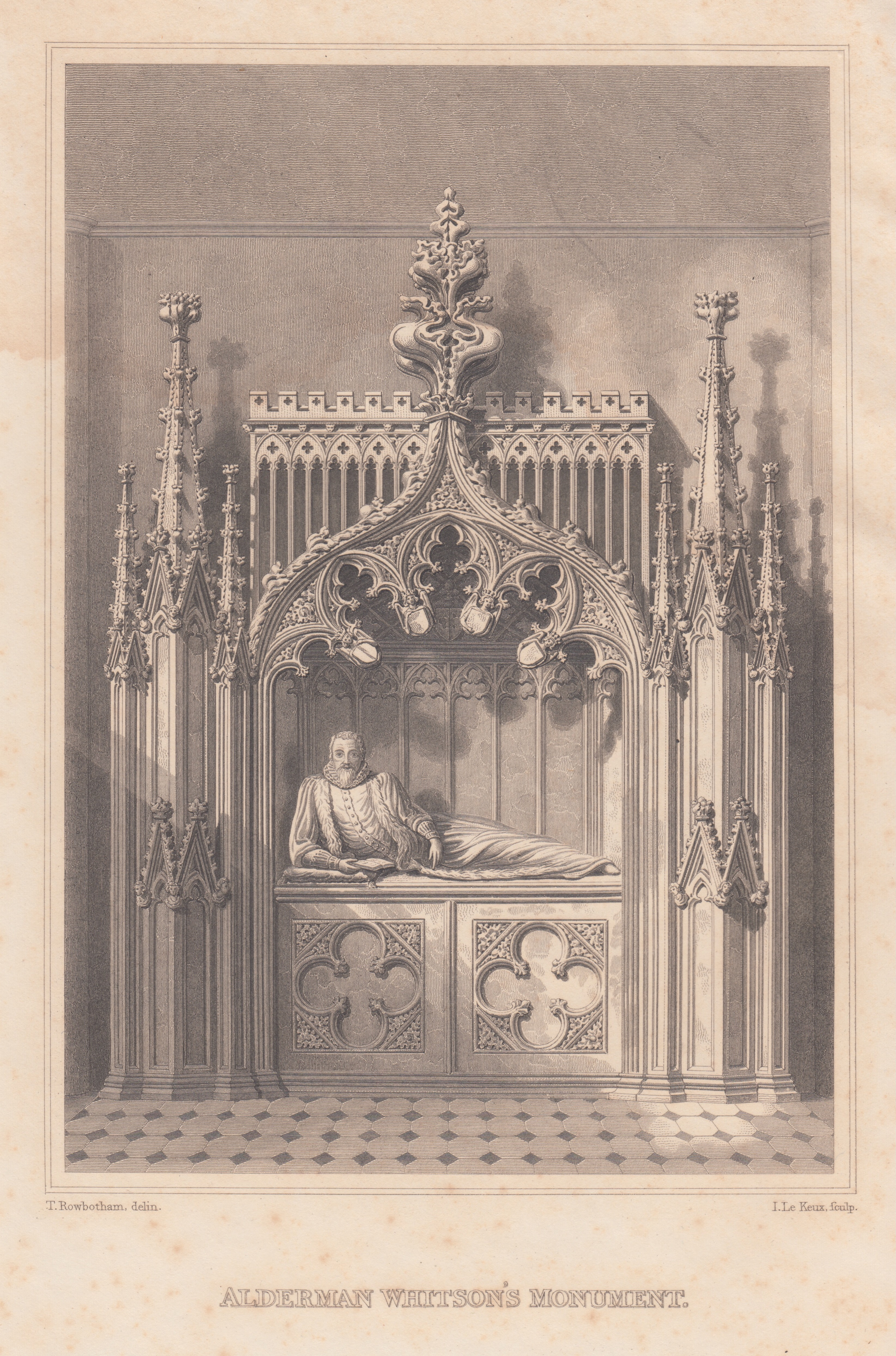
Alderman Whitson's Monument in St Nicholas Church, c.1820

Whitson was hurt by a fall from his horse, his head hitting an upturned nail by a Blacksmiths, which was the supposed cause of his death at the age of 71. He was buried at St Nicholas' Church on 9 March 1629 and, as he was Captain of the trained bands of the city, they attended his body to the church and the musketeers fired three volleys over his grave. His monument in St Nicholas described him as "a worthy pattern to all who came after him".

Whitson’s will gave specific instructions for provision for "one woman … and forty poor women children" who were to be taught English and sew, to attend church, and were bound to their teacher for eight years. Each child was to "go appareled in red cloth", as per the boys educated at the Queen Elizabeth's Hospital school, thus founding The Red Maids' School as the oldest girls’ school in the country.

== Archives ==
Archival material relating to John Whitson's charities, including minute books, account books and records of the Red Maids School, are held by Bristol Archives (Ref. 33041/BMC/6) (online catalogue).

== Bibliography ==
- John Eden (ed.), A Pious Meditation, composed in the seventeenth century, by John Whitson, Alderman of the City of Bristol to which is subjoined some account of the author by the late Mr. George Symes Catcott, with additional memoirs collected by the present editor (Bristol, 1829)
- Patrick McGrath, John Whitson and the Merchant Community of Bristol (Bristol Historical Association pamphlet, no. 25, 1970), 23 pp.

Parliament of England
| Preceded by George Snigge; Thomas James | Member of Parliament for Bristol; 1605-1624; With: Thomas James 1605–1614; John Guy 1620-1624 | Succeeded by John Guy; John Barker |
| Preceded by John Guy; John Barker | Member of Parliament for Bristol; 1625-1628; With: Nicholas Hyde 1625; John Doughty 1626-1628 | Succeeded by John Doughty; John Barker |
