= William Colston =

- Born: Bristol, England
- Occupations: Newfoundland settler and deputy governor of colony

William Colston (fl. 1610–1612) was an Englishman and one of the first settlers in the colony at Cuper's Cove, Newfoundland and Labrador, Canada.

He was almost certainly a native of Bristol, England, and travelled to Newfoundland in 1610 as one of the first settlers in a scheme for the plantation of Newfoundland. They settled at Cuper's Cove and the colony was governed by John Guy, another Bristol man. Some authorities claim that Colston was Guy's brother-in-law, though this is uncertain.

John Guy appointed Colston as deputy governor during his absence from the colony between August 1611 and June 1612, and Colston kept the required journal of weather and what the settlers were doing throughout the winter, though this journal has not survived. After Guy returned from England, with 16 women settlers, cattle and a chaplain, he is reported to have sent Colston home to England for a holiday. Back in Bristol, Colston told John Slany, treasurer of the London and Bristol Company who sponsored the Cuper's Cove colony, of the vast riches to be had in Newfoundland.

Other authorities claim that he remained longer in Cuper's Cove, and that Colston recorded the first birth of an English child in the settlement on 27 March 1613, when Nicholas Guy and his wife had a baby boy. Prowse claims that Guy abandoned Newfoundland in 1613, and left Colston in charge of the colony.
