= John Doughty (MP) =

English politician

John Doughty (c.1562 – 20 December 1629) was an English Member of Parliament in the House of Commons from 1626 to 1629.

He was the son of John Doughty, a yeoman of Stottesdon, Shropshire.

He was a common councilman of Bristol from 1606 to 1620 and an alderman from 1620 to his death. He was elected sheriff of Bristol for 1606–07 and mayor for 1620–21.

In 1626 he was elected Member of Parliament for Bristol and was re-elected in 1628, sitting until 1629 when King Charles decided to rule without parliament for eleven years. In 1629 he established a charity of £100 for ten hand craftsmen.

He married Mary, and had 3 sons and 6 daughters.

Parliament of England
Preceded by John Whitson; Nicholas Hyde	Member of Parliament for Bristol; 1626–1629; With: John Whitson 1626; John Barker 1628–1629	Parliament suspended until 1640
