= Anita Mason =

English novelist (1942–2020)

Anita Frances Mason
- Born: 30 July 1942; Bristol, England
- Died: 8 September 2020 (aged 78); Bristol, England
- Education: The Red Maids' School, Oxford University
- Occupation: Writer
- Writing career
- Years active: 1980–2020
- Genres: Dystopian fiction, science fiction, historical fiction
- Notable works: The Illusionist (1983), The Racket (1990), The Right Hand of the Sun (2008)
- Notable awards: Booker Prize shortlist; Fawcett Prize shortlist

Anita Frances Mason (30 July 1942 – 8 September 2020) was an English novelist, best known as a Booker Prize nominee. She was the author of eight novels, including The Illusionist (1983), The Racket (1990), and The Right Hand of the Sun (2008).

== Background ==
Anita France Mason was born in Bristol, England on 30 July 1942. She was an only child. Her mother was a housewife, and her father worked at a factory that manufactured aircraft engines. She attended The Red Maids' School, in Bristol. After studying English at Oxford University, Mason eventually began writing after periods spent working in publishing, journalism and organic farming. Mason is the author of eight novels as well as a number of short stories. Mason is also the editor of Frome Hundred (2004), a collection of articles, poems and stories contributed by people from the area of Frome (Somerset, UK) at a number of writing workshops. Anita Mason died of polymyositis in Bristol on 8 September 2020. At the time of her death, Mason had written three short novels that remain unpublished. These were Chuichui, set in contemporary Haiti, Suppose, set in contemporary Israel, and Andromeda, a dystopian tale set in south-west England that follows the consequences of the mass suicide of animals.

== Career ==
Mason's novels include Bethany (Hamish Hamilton, 1981); The Illusionist (Hamish Hamilton, 1983), which was nominated for the 1983 Booker Prize in the UK; The War Against Chaos (Hamish Hamilton, 1988); The Racket (Constable 1990), shortlisted for the Fawcett prize 1990; Angel (Hamish Hamilton, 1994), which was also published with the alternative title Reich Angel; The Yellow Cathedral (Spinsters Ink, 2002); Perfection (Spinsters Ink, 2003); and The Right Hand of the Sun, published by John Murray in September 2008;. Her short stories "Irma" and "Interpretation" have been included in the collections Winter's Tales, volumes 6 and 9, respectively (Constable, 1990 & 1993, ed. Robin Baird-Smith).

Mason took up a number of fellowships at British academic institutions, such as Leeds, Warwick and Bath Spa Universities.

=== Novel settings ===
Mason's novels are extremely varied in terms of both their historical and geographical settings. Bethany is about a commune in Cornwall; The Illusionist is the story of Simon Magus, and his relationship with the early Christians; The War Against Chaos is set in a dystopian future (or alternative present) in which a victim of corruption encounters marginalised communities while in search of his estranged wife; The Racket is set in modern-day Brazil; Angel tells of a female test-pilot working for the Nazis (it is based loosely on the life of Hanna Reitsch); The Yellow Cathedral is an account of the political conflict in Chiapas, Mexico; Perfection is set during the Anabaptist rebellion in 16th-century Germany; and The Right Hand of the Sun covers the Spanish invasion and settlement of Central America. Two short stories, "Interpretation" and "Irma" are both set in Latin America: the former in pre-colonial times; the latter in present-day Brazil.

=== Recurring themes ===
Recurring themes in Mason's work include the establishment of alternative communities that oppose the values of mainstream society; the tension between the desires of an individual and the priorities of the collective; the ambiguity of religion as both a force that brings meaning, and as a ready excuse for oppression and violence; the similarly ambiguous nature of sexuality as a source of affection and sensuality, but also as the site of unequal relationships of power; and the use of the past as a mirror of the contemporary period.

== Published works ==
- Bethany (1981)
- The Illusionist (1983)
- The War Against Chaos (1988)
- The Racket (1990)
- Reich Angel (also published as Angel) (1994)
- The Yellow Cathedral (2002)
- Perfection (2003)
- The Right Hand of the Sun (2008)

== Summary of select works ==
=== Bethany ===
Mason's first novel is set in the mid-1970s, and is narrated by Kay, the companion of Alex, who owns the house in Cornwall that gives the novel its title. Alex is a former jeweller who bought Bethany as part of her scheme to "drop out" of mainstream life, but who is now heavily in debt. To Kay's initial consternation, Alex invites a group of friends to join them at Bethany in an attempt at communal living: Simon, a charismatic and confident advocate of alternative lifestyles; his Thai partner Dao; Simon's friend Peter and his American partner Coral; and several children. Gradually, Simon exerts his influence over the household, persuading Kay to adopt many of his ideas, but Simon and Alex enter a conflict that threatens to ruin the experiment.

=== The Illusionist ===
The novel is set in the Holy Land some years after the death of Christ. Its principal character is Simon Magus, a magician forced to live on his wits who travels from town to town, accompanied by his slave-boy Demetrius. In one town he encounters a sect whose members have the ability to heal, but whose philosophy infuriates him. Intrigued by the sect, he accepts baptism but, after a dispute with their leader, Kepha (Saint Peter), he finds he can no longer work his magic. He abandons Demetrius, and lives as a beggar. After befriending a prostitute named Helen, he develops a dualist philosophy based upon sex and transgression of the law. He begins his performances of magic again, and eventually travels to Rome, where he is obliged to perform before Nero in competition with Kepha.

=== The War Against Chaos ===
The War Against Chaos is set in a dystopian version of Britain that is similar in its depiction of a grey, shabby, philistine country, to Orwell's 1984. The principal character, Hare, is a clerk for a vast conglomerate known as Universal Goods, who is dismissed from his job and his lodgings after his corrupt boss, Jacobs, manipulates evidence against him. After sleeping rough, Hare is befriended by a community of so-called "marginals" who live in anarchic communes on the fringes of society. After recuperating, Hare decides to search for his estranged wife, an artist who fled mainstream society after the government closed all art colleges. He encounters another group, known as "Diggers", who live in abandoned subterranean chambers that were originally intended for use in the event of nuclear war. A group of young Diggers attempt to seize their own plot of land, but the attempt is a failure, and Hare is obliged to lead a group of fleeing marginals and Diggers into "the Zone", a mysterious patch of land where, it is rumoured, nothing is able to survive.

The novel is clearly informed by the political events of the decade in which it was written. The account, towards the end of the novel, of the suppression of a demonstration by police in full riot gear, is reminiscent of events during the UK miners' strike of 1984–85. Similarly, the account of the way in which the government had manipulated popular fears about nuclear war to effect programmes of social manipulation, indicates the closing years of the Cold War between the Soviet Union and the West.

=== The Racket ===
Rosa Van Meurs is a history teacher in the southern Brazilian city of Florianópolis. She discovers that a road serving a gold mine in the Pantanal region has been driven through Indian land, and writes a letter of protest to the American press (on the grounds that no action would be taken in Brazil). The letter is taken seriously because of her father's reputation as an anthropologist. As a consequence, one of the mine's co-owners, Roberto Bandeiras, initiates a campaign of harassment against her. Meanwhile, she is visited by her cousin, Fabio, a poet and drifter who is on the run from a trafficker named Cesar. Fabio stays with Rosa, and starts work in a church museum, but is captured by Cesar and put back to work for him. Rosa has an argument with her boyfriend Sergio over the possibility of taking revenge against Bandeiras, and the couple separate. Fabio escapes from Cesar and returns to Rosa.

=== Reich Angel ===
Freddy Kurtz is a young German woman who overcomes formidable opposition – not least from her father – to her ambition of becoming a pilot. She abandons her studies in medicine to fly gliders, and becomes a reputed test pilot for the growing German air force after the establishment of the Nazi regime. Because she is a woman, and because of her exceptional abilities, she becomes something of a celebrity, and meets many of the leading figures in the Nazi party, including Hitler and Himmler. Although she dislikes the Nazis, she accepts her duties, and makes no protest, on the grounds that to do so would be pointless. After receiving serious injuries in a crash, she becomes despondent about her recovery, and visits the Russian front, where she witnesses Nazi atrocities. She gives up flying and helps the victims of bombing in Berlin, where she and her neighbour, Paula, become lovers. After recovering her spirits, Freddy decides to return to flying, and plans to move with Paula closer to her base in Darmstadt, but Paula disappears. As the Russian army closes in on Berlin, Freddy is given the task of piloting an air force General between Admiral Dönitz's base in the north, and Hitler's bunker in Berlin.

=== The Yellow Cathedral ===
Arguably Mason's most explicitly political novel, The Yellow Cathedral is set in the impoverished southern Mexican state of Chiapas in the early 1990s, at the time of the rebellion by the indigenous population and Zapatista activists (the EZLN) against the wealthy landowners and the political establishment. The book relates the attempt by the opposition party (the PRD) to install a (democratically elected) 'rebel' governor, Avendano, in place of Rosas, the placeman of the central government, and representative of the dominant PRI party. The narrative switches between a number of characters who represents different aspects of the conflict. Benito, a young PRD activist, is impatient at the peaceful strategy advocated by his respected uncle Hernandez, and falls in with a group who carry out a disastrous raid on a ranch. Rafael is another young man whose work for the PRD estranges him from his father. Similarly, Rafael's sister Maria has angered her father over her conversion to evangelism and her rumoured affair with the local PRD candidate, Mateo Mendez. Mateo is eventually beaten by PRI supporters, and Maria driven from her home by a mob. The life of the rebel governor Avendano, who works with little or no equipment or money in the thick of communal life, is contrasted with that of Rosas, the official governor, who frequents meetings with the President and Pereira, the leader of the local ranchers. Pereira wants Rosas to suppress the rebels ruthlessly, but the president has instructed Rosas to win hearts and minds, albeit with few resources that might back up the demands for reform. The Zapatistas initiate an uprising, which is suppressed by the army. In San Cristobal, a mob attacks the cathedral, where the left-wing Bishop Samuel Ruiz is staging a fast in support of the rebels. Indigenous supporters of the Bishop protect the cathedral, and are attacked, but police eventually arrive to disperse the mob.

The novel contains a postscript that explains the political background to its composition, and lists a number of books and websites dedicated to the situation in Chiapas.

=== Perfection ===
The novel is set in 16th-century Germany, at the time of the Anabaptist rebellion. The civic leaders of Münster are supporters of the Anabaptist movement, and so attract to the city hordes of refugees fleeing religious persecution. Among these are the charismatic former actor and playwright, Jan Bockelson, and the zealous Jan Matthys, who quickly become the most powerful figures in the city. They expel all non-believers, and abolish money and private property. Munster is subsequently besieged by the expelled Bishop von Waldeck, and Mattys, with a small troop of men, rides out to confront the besiegers, convinced that his enemies will be defeated by God, and that his assumed victory will initiate the founding of a New Jerusalem. The troop is massacred, and Matthys's head displayed on a pike. Subsequently, Bockelson takes charge, and continues the siege for another year, during which he crowns himself king and enforces polygamy. As the inhabitants of the city suffer starvation, the bishop makes a determined assault on the city's defences, during which a recurring character, Sister Agnes, makes her escape.

=== The Right Hand of the Sun ===
The novel deals with Hernán Cortés' conquest of Mexico in 1519–21, and is partly narrated by Cortes' interpreter, a Spaniard named Gerónimo de Aguilar, who had been shipwrecked in the area a decade earlier, and had lived for years as a member of an indigenous tribe.

The novel begins at the point where Geronimo decides to leave his village and joins Hernán Cortés' expedition as a translator. As he becomes aware of the true motives of the expedition, he becomes increasingly ambivalent about his decision. Cortés is revealed as a ruthless and cunning opportunist who persuades his men to travel inland to conquer the city of Tenochtitlan, the capital of the wealthy empire of the Meshica people and their ruler, Moctezuma. As the expedition nears its goal, the narrative returns to the tale of Geronimo's shipwreck and his life in the winic village of Chanek.

The narrative then continues with the story of the expedition's arrival in Tenochtitlan, where it meets with a peaceful reception. After some time, however, the Meshica become angry at the behaviour of Cortés and his men and, after the death of Moctezuma, drive them from the city. Accompanied by members of other tribes, Cortés returns to carry out a bloody siege.

== Awards ==
- Booker Prize shortlist, 1983, for The Illusionist
- Writer's fellowship, Leeds University, 1984
- Fawcett Prize shortlist, 1990, for The Racket
