= Percival Willoughby =

English land owner, businessman, & entrepreneur (died 1643)

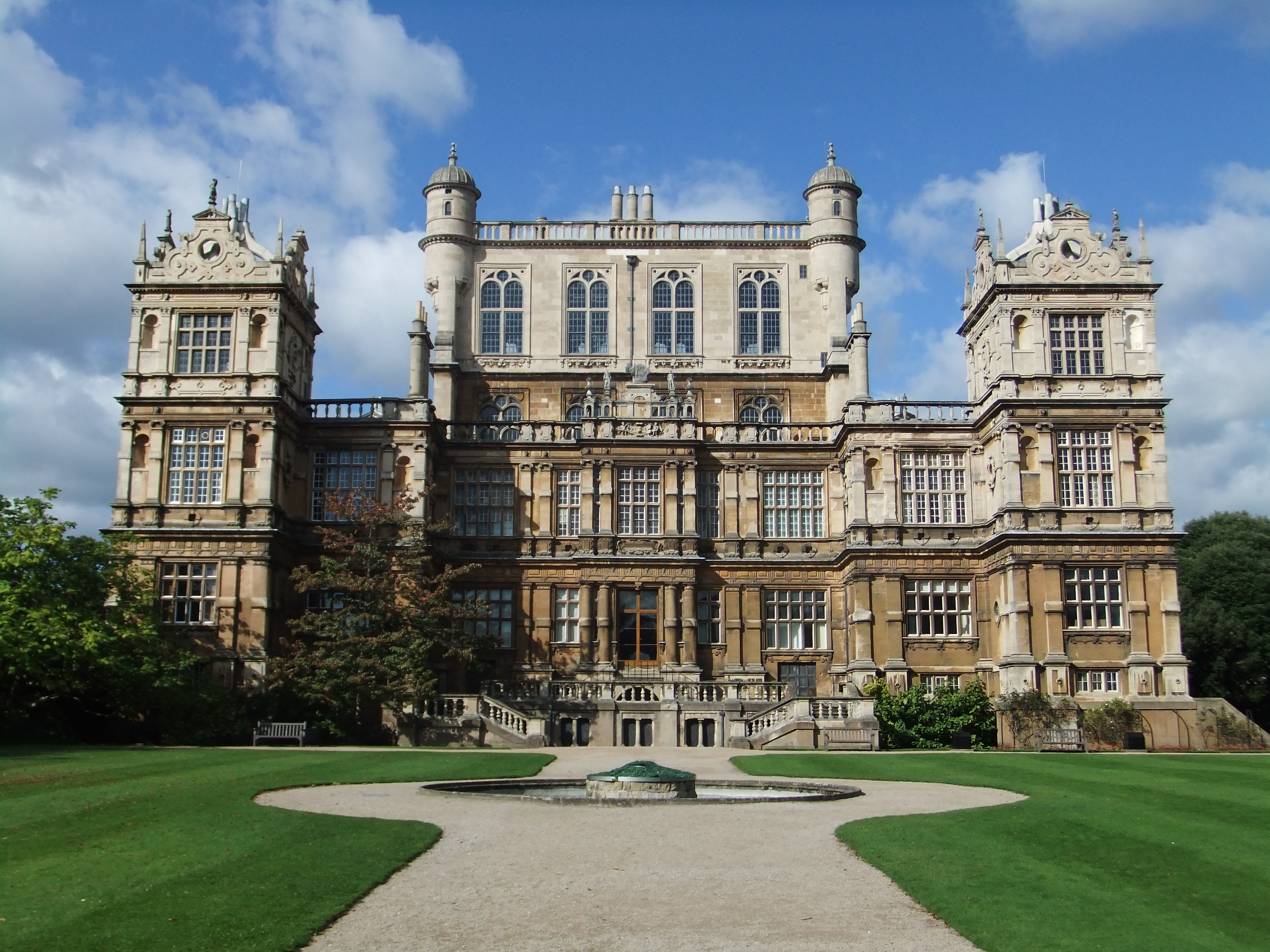
Wollaton Hall, Nottingham

Sir Percival Willoughby (died 23 August 1643) of Wollaton Hall, Nottinghamshire was a prominent land owner, businessman, and entrepreneur involved during his lifetime variously in mining, iron smelting, and glass making enterprises in Nottinghamshire. He was also an important investor in the Newfoundland Company.

He was the eldest son of Thomas Willoughby of Bore Place, Chiddingstone, Kent and educated at Furnival's Inn and Lincoln's Inn (1579). He married Bridget Willoughby, his second cousin, the daughter of Sir Francis Willoughby, builder of Wollaton Hall. She, as co-heiress of her father, inherited Wollaton Hall. Sir Percival sold all the lands he had inherited from his father in Kent to pay off some of the enormous debts the construction of the Hall had entailed. Sir Percival and his wife Lady Bridget eventually occupied the new building but in later generations it was never the principal home of the Willoughby family. Middleton Hall in Warwickshire was the family's usual residence.

Willoughby was knighted by King James I on 20 April 1603 at Worksop. On 21 June he hosted Anne of Denmark and her children Prince Henry and Princess Elizabeth at Wollaton Hall. Shortly afterwards was returned as member of Parliament for Nottinghamshire and Tamworth in King James' first parliament, choosing to sit for Nottinghamshire. He was returned again and sat for Tamworth in 1614.

Percival Willoughby's business partner, Huntingdon Beaumont, was responsible for constructing the Wollaton Wagonway.

== Newfoundland ==
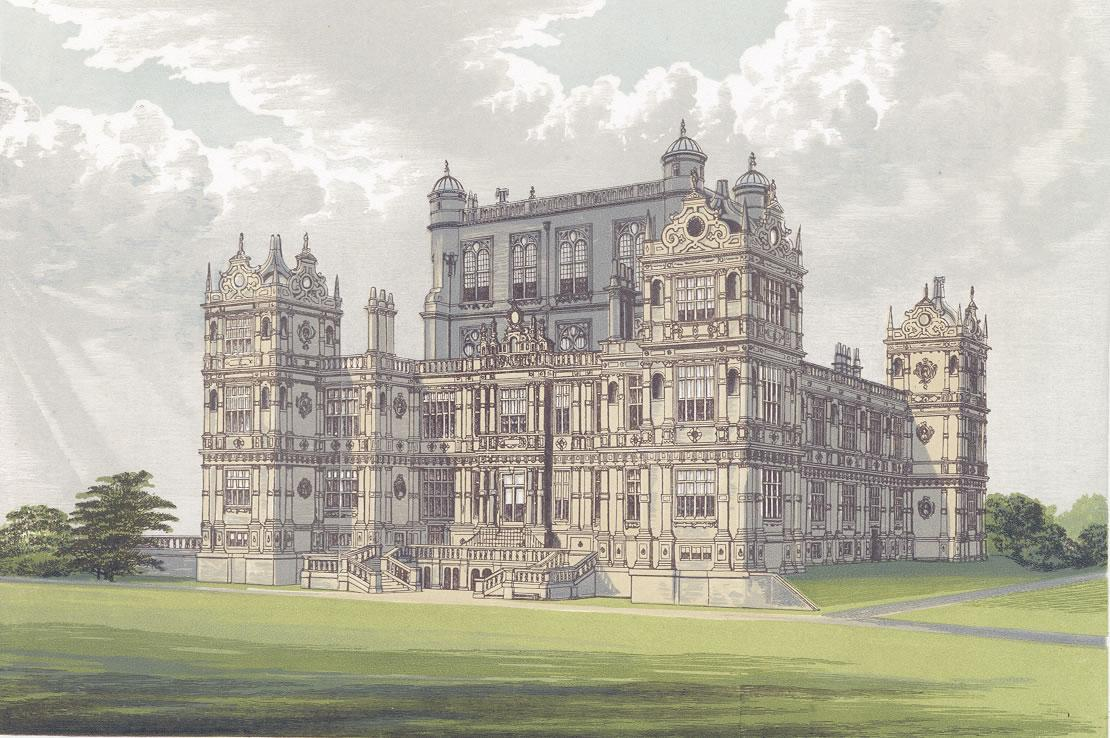
Wollaton Hall from the park

Willoughby was drawn into the Newfoundland Company venture by John Slany, to whom he was heavily in debt. Appointed to the council which managed the company's affairs in 1610, he sent his third son Thomas to Cuper's Cove in 1612 along with Henry Crout and six apprentices.

The orders to the party were to leave the colony and develop Willoughby's own tract which was all that land north of a line drawn between Carbonear and Heart's Content on the Bay de Verde Peninsula. This also included the rich fishing grounds around Baccalieu Island. Bartholomew Pearson and a surveyor named Olney had made the trip to Newfoundland to access its mineral and agricultural potential. Willoughby's main interest lay in the mining potential of Bell Island and was very critical of his party's lack of exploration on the island upon their return to England.

Willoughby's partnership in 1618 with Thomas Rowley and William Hannam to give them half of his tract for a nominal fee had turned sour. Willoughby's entitlement to the land was becoming increasingly harder to maintain as he could not find anyone to settle on it. Then in 1631 he entered into a partnership with Nicholas Guy, who at the time was living in Carbonear.

His son, Sir Francis Willoughby (1635 - 1672), married Cassandra Ridgeway, daughter of Thomas Ridgeway, 1st Earl of Londonderry. His daughter, Elizabeth Willoughby, married Sir John Gell, 1st Baronet of Hopton. Another daughter, Bridget Willoughby, married to Henry Cavendish II, son of Sir Henry Cavendish, and grandson of Sir William Cavendish and Countess Bess of Hardwick.

His grandson was Francis Willughby of Wollaton, father of Cassandra, Duchess of Chandos.
