= John Hopkins (Bristol MP) =

Member of the Parliament of England

John Hopkins (died 1615) was an English politician who sat in the House of Commons in 1601.

Hopkins was a merchant of Bristol. He was an Alderman and became Sheriff in 1586 and Mayor in 1600. In 1601, he was elected Member of Parliament for Bristol.

== See also ==
- Politics of the United Kingdom

Parliament of England
| Preceded by George Snigge; Thomas James | Member of Parliament for Bristol; 1601; With: George Snigge | Succeeded by George Snigge; Thomas James |
