= Katherine Press =

British actress

- Occupation: actress
- Website: http://www.katherinepress.co.uk/

Katherine Press is an English actress, best known for her role as Hannah in Stephen Poliakoff’s 2013 BBC series Dancing on the Edge.

Born in Bristol and educated at The Redmaids' School, Press trained as a dancer at Central School of Ballet before attending the University of Cambridge.

In 2011 Press played the role of Ophelia in Trevor Nunn’s acclaimed production of Tom Stoppard’s Rosencrantz & Guildenstern are Dead at Chichester Festival Theatre and the Theatre Royal Haymarket, starring original History Boys Samuel Barnett and Jamie Parker. She subsequently filmed Dancing on the Edge for the BBC and the feature film Closed Circuit, starring Rebecca Hall and Eric Bana. Other screen credits include Midsomer Murders, Doctors, Captain America: The First Avenger and Foyle's War.
