= Henry Crout =

English settler and explorer

Henry Crout (fl. 1612 – 1617) was a settler and explorer, most likely from Devon in the English West Country. He became an investor in the London and Bristol Company and acted as Sir Percival Willoughby's agent and guardian to his son Thomas at the Cuper's Cove plantation in Newfoundland.

Crout was impressed with Newfoundland, and in his letters to Sir Percival Willoughby noted the potential of exploiting its rich resources and the possibility of establishing a fur trade with the Beothuk. He had noted in his correspondence the frequent raids of the pirate Peter Easton on the fishermen. He was accused of being a sympathizer with the pirates but claimed that he only met with them in an attempt to right wrongs done to the colonists and migratory fishermen.

Crout's primary duty was to Willoughby who planned to establish a settlement on the peninsula. He was to find a route from Conception Bay to Trinity Bay and make contact with the Beothuk. Early in September, 1612 he led a party to within a few miles of Trinity Bay cutting a trail (or "way") as he went. On September 9 a second crew was sent out to finish the way and widen it "for 2 men to passe together". The trail was extended for 18 miles from Cupers Cove to a place the colonists called "Mount Eagle Bay" but which today is called Hopeall.

From September 1, 1612 to May 13, 1613 Crout kept the colony's weather journal. He accompanied John Guy on his voyage to contact the Beothuk in Trinity Bay in the autumn of 1612 and wrote two accounts of the voyage. In July 1613 Crout made a second voyage into Trinity Bay in an attempt to contact the Beothuk. He returned to England in August 1613 to report to Willoughby in detail, and in the spring of 1616 he and Thomas Willoughby returned to Newfoundland with plans to build a house on Sir Percival's land in Carbonear. His attempt to settle in Carbonear failed. He spent the winter of 1616-1617 in Cupers Cove and probably returned to England in 1617.

Henry Crout's weather journal and a number of his letters have survived and contain a great deal of information on the early days of settlement in Newfoundland and contact between the early colonists and the Beothuk.
