= Redmaids' High School =

Location
- Westbury Road; Bristol, BS9 3AW; England
- Coordinates: 51.4901°N 2.6140°W

Information
- Type: Private day school
- Established: 1634; 392 years ago
- Founder: John Whitson, Revd Rose and Urijah Thomas
- Department for Education URN: 109371 Tables
- Head: Paul Dwyer
- Gender: Girls
- Age: 7 to 18
- Houses: Maryflower, Seabreake, Discoverer, Speedwell
- Colours: Red, Green, Yellow, Blue
- Publication: 1634
- Website: www.redmaidshigh.co.uk

Redmaids' High School is a private day school for girls in Westbury-on-Trym, Bristol, England. The school is a member of the Girls' Schools Association and the Head is a member of the Headmasters' and Headmistresses' Conference (HMC).

The school was established under its present name in September 2017, following a merger between Redland High School for Girls (founded 1882) and the Red Maids' School (founded 1634).

On 2 September 2024 it was announced that the school had joined the Girls Day School Trust.

== History ==
Red Maids' school was founded in 1634 from the bequest of John Whitson, Mayor of Bristol 1603–4 and 1615–16 and in November 1605 he was returned to parliament for Bristol at a by-election, subsequently representing the town in the assemblies of 1614, 1621, 1625, and 1626, making it the oldest surviving girls' school in England. His original Red Maids' Hospital, on Denmark Street in the centre of Bristol, was founded to provide a secure home for the orphaned or destitute daughters of freemen or burgesses of the City of Bristol, where they were taught to read and sew. The site was irreparably damaged and had to be completely rebuilt in the 1840s. The new school building was designed in 1844 by the architect James Foster.

The entrance lodge of the existing site in Westbury-on-Trym dates from 1830 and has been designated by English Heritage as a Grade II listed building. During the First World War, Red Maids' School was moved to Manor House, which is now part of the University of Bristol, while the school buildings in Westbury were used as a Red Cross hospital.

Redland High School was founded in 1882. The senior school was housed in an old manor-house known as Redland Court which dates from 1732 to 1735. It was built by John Strachan for John Cossins and has been designated by English Heritage as a grade II* listed building, which has undergone many extensions. In October 2006, a building previously belonging to the Junior School was converted into the Music School, expanding the senior school once again. Governors of Redland's school included Agnes Beddoe, Elizabeth and Emily Sturge, who were leading suffragists and campaigners for women's higher education in Victorian times. There are blue plaques to remind students of their achievements. In September 2020, Paul Dwyer took over as Headteacher on the retirement of Isabel Tobias.

== Archives ==
Numerous collections of records of Red Maids' School and John Whitson are held at Bristol Archives, including (Ref. 33041/BMC/6) (online catalogue) and (Ref. 20193) (online catalogue). There are also a number of records for the former Redland High School for Girls and Red Maids' School on site in the archive room at Redmaids' High School in Westbury-on-Trym.

== Founders' Commemoration Day ==
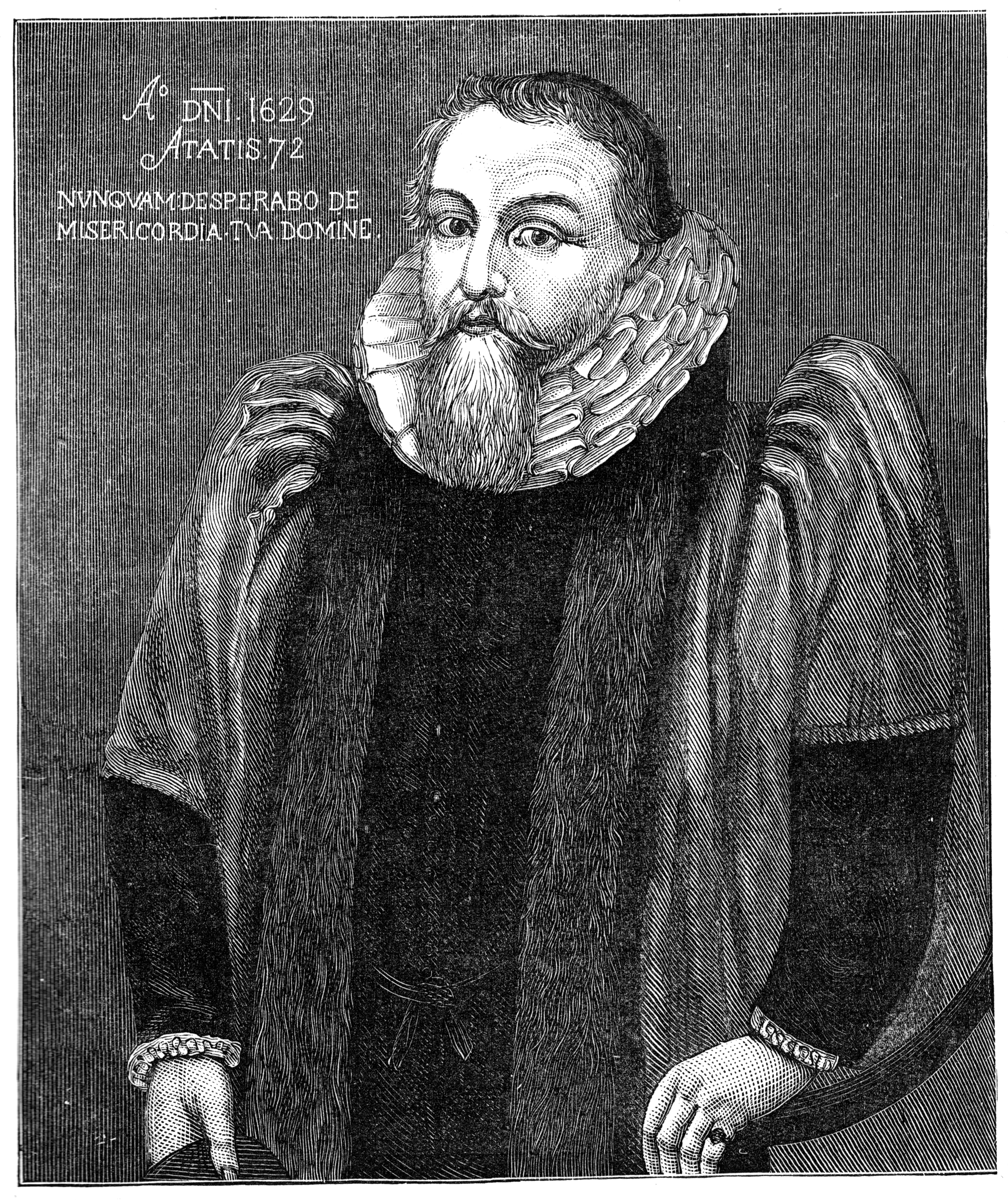
John Whitson, founder of Red Maids' School

Redmaids' High School Founders' Commemoration Day is the annual celebration of the life and vision of the founder, John Whitson, and also a day to remember the founders of Redland High School for Girls, Reverend Rose and Urijah Thomas. The event is timed to commemorate the attempted murder of Whitson on 7 November 1626, when Christopher Callowhill stabbed him in the face with a dagger. Whitson survived for two years after this attack before dying after falling from a horse.

On Founders' Commemoration Day all the girls march through Bristol City centre accompanied by police and a rolling road closure, from Welsh Back to the cathedral, where a service takes place. The girls are then allowed the afternoon off.

== Facilities and campus ==
The Junior School and Senior School are separate, but located close together, allowing the junior school full use of the secondary school's facilities.

The senior school, set in extensive grounds, consists of three main buildings: Burfield House, the 300 Building (opened in 1934) and Redland Hall — a high-spec performance space — which was opened in September 2017. There is also a music block, which houses a Mac suite, and a sports hall which contains a dance studio and large indoor sports space. Attached to Redland Hall is the Sixth Form Centre, which has recently undergone refurbishment. There are also three computer laboratories in the school and extensive textiles and artwork facilities. The junior school site is a house on Grange Court Road. It was extended in 2015 and again in 2017 which included the creation of a brand new adventure playground.

There is an artificial turf (AstroTurf), opened in 2005, an indoor sports hall and two additional netball/tennis courts. Within the grounds of the Senior School there are two former air raid shelters used during World War II which attract visits from local schools as part of their history studies. In 2017 it was announced that the school had purchased a new sports site: The Lawns at Cribbs Causeway. The site is less than 10 minutes' drive from the School. The 16.7-acre (6.8 ha) plot includes four full-size grass football pitches, four tennis courts, a 3G all-weather AstroTurf pitch, a large carpark, together with extensive changing and social facilities. The school will be investing in further development to the site over the coming years.

== School life ==
The school is divided into three sections: the junior school (7–11), the senior school (11–16), and the sixth form (16–18).

=== Houses ===
The school has a house system with competitions in activities such as dance, music, hockey, netball and drama. The four houses are named after four of John Whitson's major ships:

- Speedwell (Blue)
- Maryflowre (Red)
- Discoverer (Yellow)
- Seabrake (Green)

=== Ethos ===
Each year the school hosts a careers conference for girls from across the south-west of the UK and beyond. In 2017 the theme was #WomenInMedicine and for 2018 the theme was #WomenInSTEM.

=== Uniform ===
The core uniform consists of a red and green checked kilt and red jumper with green piping, with a white blouse. In the Senior School, girls also wear a red blazer. In the Junior School, the girls wear a red showerproof coat. In the summer, the juniors wear a red and white summer dress.

In the Sixth Form, the students wear their own clothes within a published dress code that encourages them to dress for a modern work place in smart, work-ready attire.

== International Baccalaureate ==
From 2009, Red Maids' sixth formers could study for A-levels or the International Baccalaureate (IB) Diploma in the Sixth Form. The school was the first independent school in Bristol to offer the IB.

== Notable former pupils ==
- Janet Arnold (1932–1998), clothing historian, costume designer and author
- Brenda Clarke (1926–2022), novelist – writer of medieval historical whodunnits
- Nana Kagga (born 1979), Ugandan actress, producer, director and petroleum engineer
- Belinda Kirk (born 1974/1975), explorer and entrepreneur
- Susan Lewis (born 1956), novelist
- Anita Mason (1942–2020), writer
- Tammy Miller (born 1967), hockey player
- Katherine Press (born 1988), actress
- Alwynne Pritchard (born 1968), performer, composer and artist
- Alice Roberts (born 1973), anatomist, osteoarchaeologist, anthropologist, humanist, TV presenter and author
- Audrey Stuckes (1923–2006), material scientist
- Emily Webley-Smith (born 1984), tennis player

== See also ==
- List of the oldest schools in the United Kingdom
