= Thomas James (died 1619) =

Mayor of Bristol

Thomas James (born c. 1555, died 23 January 1619) was an English merchant and politician who sat in the House of Commons for Bristol in 1604-11 and 1614.

James was the son of Edward James of Wollaston. He became a merchant of Bristol and was Sheriff in 1591. He was elected Member of Parliament for Bristol in 1604 and was also mayor of Bristol in 1605. In 1614 he was re-elected MP for Bristol.

Preceded by George Snigge; John Hopkins	Member of Parliament for Bristol; 1604–1614; With: George Snigge 1604–1605; John Whitson 1605–1614	Succeeded by John Whitson; John Guy
