= George Snigge =

English lawyer and politician

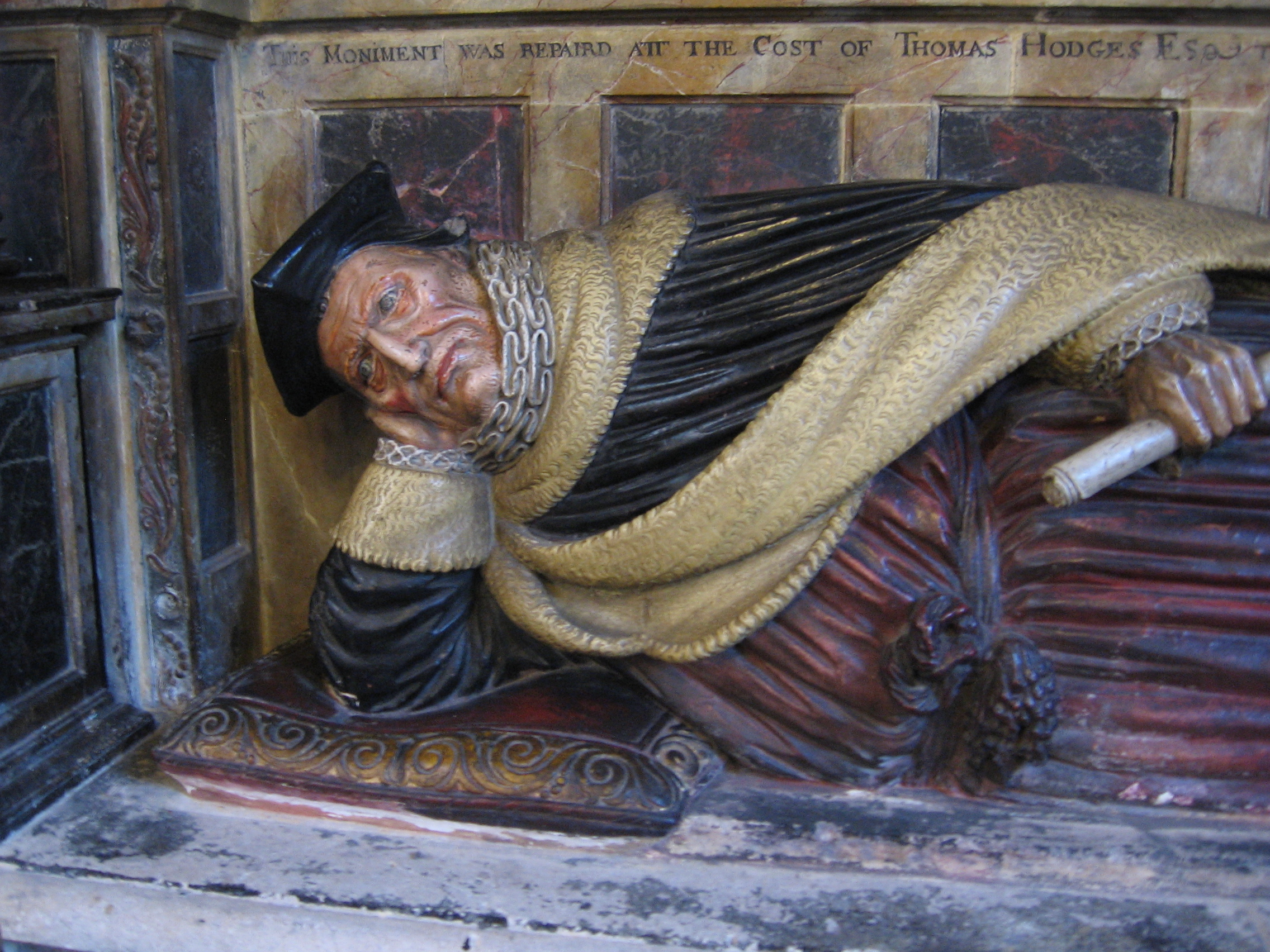
Tomb effigy of George Snigge in St Stephen's Church, Bristol

Sir George Snigge (1544/45 – 11 November 1617) was an English lawyer and politician who sat in the House of Commons at various times between 1589 and 1605.

Snigge was the son and heir of George Snigge (died 1582) who was Mayor of Bristol in 1575. He became a student of Christ Church, Oxford in 1564, and was awarded BA on 25 June 1566. He was admitted a student of the Middle Temple on 9 August 1567 and was called to the bar on 17 June 1575.

In 1568, Snigge was elected Member of Parliament for Cricklade in Wiltshire. He was Autumn Reader for his Inn in 1590 and became Recorder of Bristol in 1593. In 1597 he was elected MP for Bristol. He was Double Lent Reader in 1599. In 1601 he was re-elected MP for Bristol. He was Treasurer of his Inn in May 1602 and was made a Serjeant-at-law in the Easter term of 1604. He was knighted about this time. In 1604 he was re-elected MP for Bristol until 1605 when he became a Baron of the Court of Exchequer. He took office on 28 June 1605 and held the office until his death. On 13 May 1608 he was additionally made Chief Justice of the Great Sessions for Breconshire, Glamorgan and Radnorshire at a salary of £50 a year and held the post until February 1617.

Snigge died at the age of 72 in London and lay in state for six weeks at Merchant Taylors Hall in Broad Street before he was buried on 23 December 1617 in St Stephen's Church, Bristol.

Snigge married Alice Young, daughter of William Young of Ogbourne, Wiltshire.

Parliament of England
| Preceded by John Higford; Richard Delabere | Member of Parliament for Cricklade; 1589; With: Thomas Smith | Succeeded by Henry Noel; John Pleydell |
| Preceded by Thomas Hanham; Richard Cole | Member of Parliament for Bristol; 1597–1605; With: Thomas James 1597; John Hopkins 1601; Thomas James 1604–1605 | Succeeded by Thomas James; John Whitson |
