= Susan Lewis (writer) =

British writer (born 1956)

- Born: 10 August 1956 (age 70); England, United Kingdom
- Occupation: Author
- Writing career
- Genre: Fiction

Susan Lewis (born 10 August 1956) is a British author living in the west of England who has written 50 novels as well as an autobiographical memoir – Just One More Day (2006) with a follow-up memoir One Day at a Time to be published November 2011. Her novels were nominated for the Romantic Novelists' Association's Romantic Novel of the Year award in 2002 and 2005.

== Career ==
Lewis was educated at The Red Maids' School in Bristol, England. After several temporary secretarial jobs she worked at the television network HTV in Bristol, then moved to London to join Thames Television to work in news, current affairs, light entertainment and drama. She knocked on the Controller's door to ask what it takes to be a success. He told her: "Oh, go away and write something". Her first novel, A Class Apart was published in 1988. She has since published a further 27 novels.

Three years after her first book was published Lewis moved to France., followed by a move to California in 1996, then to the French Riviera in 2004. During this time she met her partner, James. She returned to Gloucestershire in the UK in 2010.

== Bibliography ==
=== Novels ===
- A Class Apart (1988)
- Dance While You Can (1991)
- Stolen Beginnings (1992)
- Darkest Longings (1993)
- Obsession (1994)
- Vengeance (1995)
- Summer Madness (1995)
- Last Resort (1996)
- Chasing Dreams (1998)
- Taking Chances (1999) (number 7 in top 10 best-seller list in June 1999)
- Silent Truths (2002) (nominated for Romantic Novel of the Year, 2002)
- The Hornbeam Tree (2004) (shortlisted for the Romantic Novel of the Year Award, 2005)
- The Mill House (2005)
- Missing (2008)
- Wildfire (2008)
- Out of the Shadows (2009)
- Lost Innocence (2009)
- Cruel Venus (2009)
- The Choice (2010)
- Intimate Strangers (novel) (2010)
- Strange Allure (2010)
- Wicked Beauty (2010)
- A French Affair (2010)
- Forgotten (2010)
- Stolen (2011)
- No Turning Back (2011)
- Losing You (2012)
- No Child of Mine (2013)
- Don't Let Me Go (2013)
- The Truth About You (2014)
- Never Say Goodbye (2014)
- Behind Closed Doors (2015)
- Too Close to Home (2015)
- No Place to Hide (2015)
- The Girl Who Came Back (2016)
- The Moment She Left (2016)
- You Said Forever (2017)
- Hiding in Plain Sight (2018)
- Believe in Me (2018)
- I Have Something to Tell You (2021)

=== Autobiography ===
- Just One More Day (2006)
- One Day at a Time (2011)

== Charitable involvement ==
Lewis' mother died of cancer when she was a child, and she is a supporter of Breast Cancer Care, and the Bristol-based charity Breast-cancer Unit Support Trust (B.U.S.T.), which raises money to help provide treatment and support for the local community and medical technology for the Breast Care Unit at Southmead Hospital, Bristol. She is also a supporter of Winston's Wish, the charity for bereaved children.
