= John Barker (Bristol MP) =

English politician

John Barker (died 1636) was an English politician who sat in the House of Commons twice between 1624 and 1628.

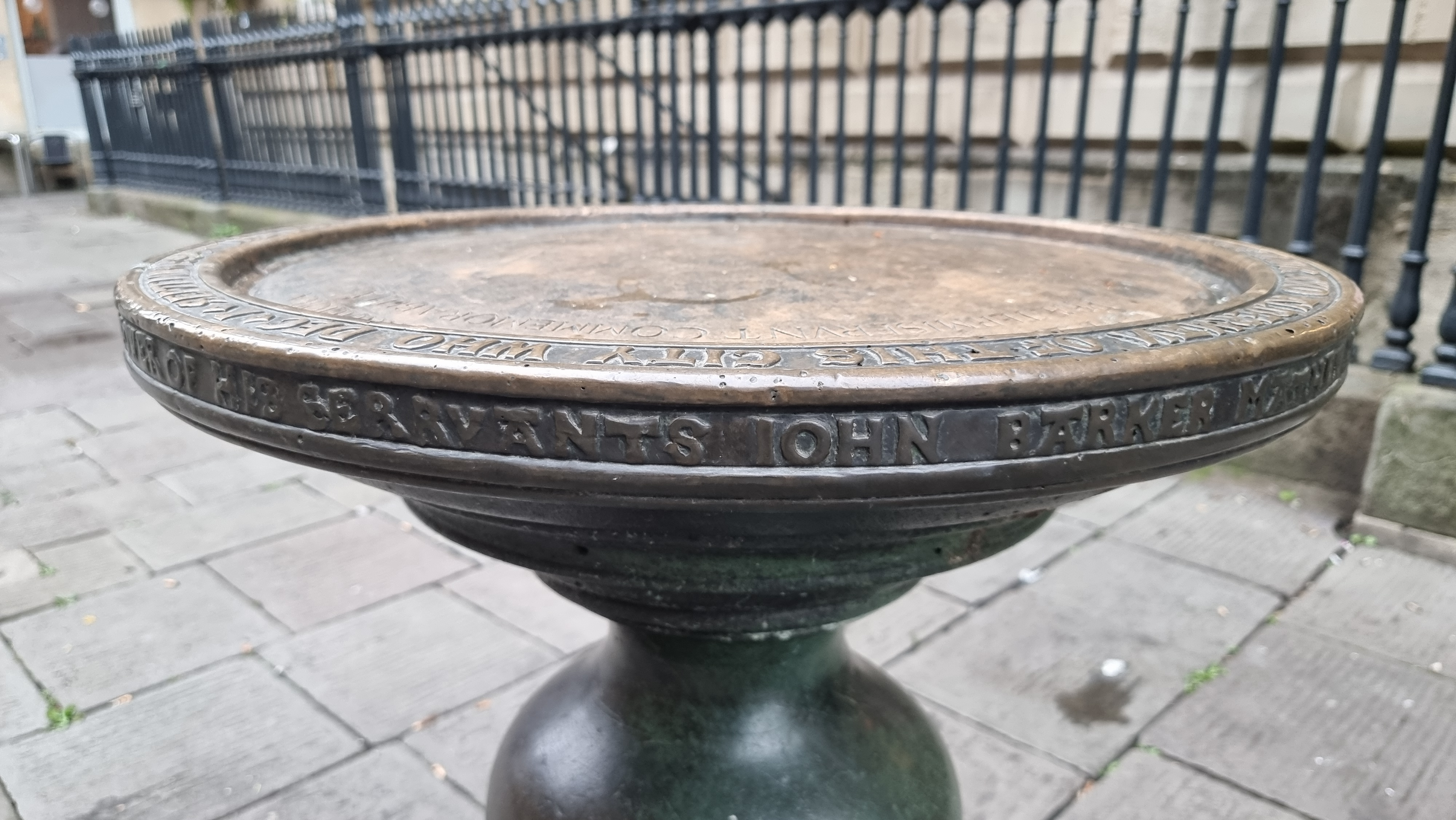
Inscription of John Barker on the second oldest "Nail" in front of The Corn Exchange in Bristol

Barker was a merchant of Bristol and an alderman. He was Sheriff in 1612. In 1624, he was elected Member of Parliament for Bristol. He was Mayor of Bristol in 1625. In 1628 he was elected MP for Bristol again and sat until 1629 when King Charles decided to rule without parliament for eleven years.

Barker died in 1636 and had a monument at St Werburgh's Church.

Parliament of England
Preceded by John Whitson; John Guy	Member of Parliament for Bristol; 1624; With: John Guy	Succeeded by Nicholas Hyde; John Whitson
Preceded by John Doughty; John Whitson	Member of Parliament for Bristol; 1628–1629; With: John Doughty	Parliament suspended until 1640
