= Richard Whitbourne =

English explorer and writer (1561 – 1635)

Sir Richard Whitbourne
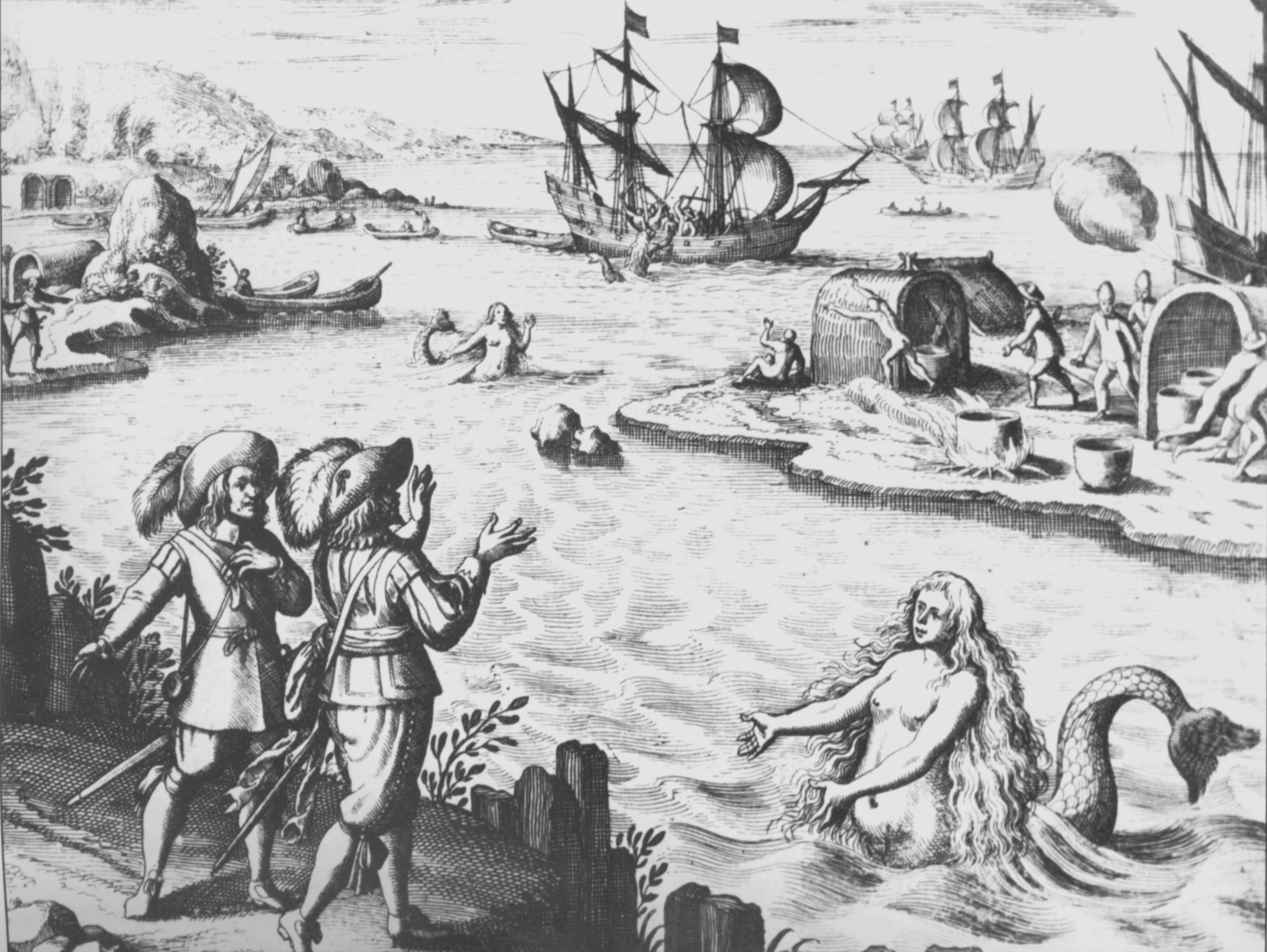
- Whitbourne encounters a "strange creature" in St. John's Harbour, Newfoundland
- Born: 1561; Devon
- Died: 1635 (aged 73–74); Unknown, possibly at sea
- Resting place: Teignmouth
- Occupations: Merchant adventurer Sea captain
- Notable work: A Discourse and Discovery of New-found-land (1620)

Proprietary Governor of Renews
- In office 1618–1620
- Preceded by: Robert Hayman (Note: As Governor of Bristol's Hope)
- Succeeded by: Francis Tanfield (Note: As Governor of South Falkland)

Sir Richard Whitbourne (1561–1635) was an English colonist, mariner and writer.

Richard Whitbourne was born near Bishopsteignton in south Devon, England, where he was baptised on 20 June 1561. Whilst apprenticed to a merchant adventurer of Southampton, he sailed extensively around Europe and twice to Newfoundland. He served in a ship of his own against the Spanish Armada under Lord Admiral Thomas Howard, 1st Earl of Suffolk (in 1588). He spent the next thirty years in cod fishing off Newfoundland. He assisted the pirates Peter Easton and Henry Mainwaring to seek pardons from James I of England.

Whitbourne was to establish law and order in Newfoundland, and was therefor appointed by the High Court of the Admiralty to set up the first English court of justice in North America at Trinity in 1615. Asked by William Vaughan to govern his colony at Renews in Newfoundland, he did so from 1618 until 1620 when Vaughan abandoned the venture. Whitbourne was sent to establish law and order in the colony, he was the first to hold a

In 1620, Whitbourne published A Discourse and Discovery of New-found-land in order to promote colonisation on the island.

Between 1589 (at latest) and 1627 Whitbourne had a house at or near Exmouth on the south Devon coast of England.

The parish register at St James the Less, West Teignmouth, has an entry for the burial of Whitebourne in the churchyard, dated August 1635.

== See also ==
- Newfoundland governors
- Whitbourne, Newfoundland and Labrador

== References and notes ==
- English, Christopher (2004). "Whitbourne, Sir Richard (1561–1635)". Oxford Dictionary of National Biography (online ed.). Oxford University Press. doi:10.1093/ref:odnb/29230. (Subscription, Wikipedia Library access or UK public library membership required.)
