= Cuper's Cove =

Early English settlement in Newfoundland, Canada

Coordinates: 47°32′43.52″N 53°13′55.27″W

Location of Cuper's Cove

Cuper's Cove, on the southwest shore of Conception Bay on Newfoundland's Avalon Peninsula was an early English settlement in the New World, and the third one after Harbour Grace, Newfoundland (1583) and Jamestown, Virginia (1607) to endure for longer than a year. It was established in 1610 by John Guy on behalf of Bristol's Society of Merchant Venturers, who had been given a charter by King James I of England to establish a colony on the island of Newfoundland. Most of the settlers left in the 1620s, but apparently a few stayed on and the site was continuously inhabited.

The community is currently known as Cupids.

== History ==
=== Site selection ===
In the early sixteenth century the island of Newfoundland was frequented by seasonal fisherman from many European countries. The competition was tough to be the first to sail to the rich fishing grounds around the island and indeed the rest of North America. The island had some obvious advantages over the rest of North America as a site to establish an English colony. The island was very familiar to fisherman and explorers, especially the bays and coves on the Avalon Peninsula where many would set up temporary shelters as they prosecuted the fishery. The merchants and owners of the vessels that made those trips to Newfoundland had recognized the importance that the strategic location that Newfoundland had placed on establishing a permanent settlement.

Time was ripe for a permanent settlement in Newfoundland. Given the failure of Walter Raleigh to establish a colony at Roanoke Island in 1584 and the successful settlement at Jamestown in 1607 and on learning that Samuel de Champlain had sailed into the St. Lawrence to initiate the settlement of New France, pressure was mounting to lay claim to the resource rich New World. King James was told that the French had made attempts to over-winter in Newfoundland and it was only a matter of time before a successful colony would be established by the French and lay claim to the island.

In 1607, Bristol's Society of Merchant Venturers which included Sir Francis Bacon, Sir Percival Willoughby and John Slany, had formed the Newfoundland Company with shares selling at £25. The Newfoundland Company had then petitioned the King James I, seeking approval to establish a colony in Newfoundland. John Guy visited the island in 1608 to scout possible locations for a settlement, selecting Cuper's Cove as his preferred location. The Privy Council accepted his petition on 2 May 1610 issuing a charter to the Earl of Northampton (Guy's patron).

In 1610, John Guy, his brother Phillip, his brother-in-law William Colston and 38 colonists had set sail from Bristol aboard three ships. In August 1610 they made landfall in the area Guy had visited two years earlier to set about building a settlement.

=== Site construction (1610—1611) ===
John Guy had landed at Cuper's Cove in August 1610 and is described in a letter from John Guy to Sir Percival Willoughby from Cuper's Cove, 6 October 1610 where it states in part:

Right worshipfull,
yt may please you to vnderstand that...
the {document torn} day of August we arrived (God be praised) all in safetie in the bay of Conception, in Newfoundland [in the] harbour here called Cuperres coue... This harbour is three leagues distance from Colliers bay to the Northeastward and is preferred by me to beginne our plantacion before the said Colliers bay fer the goodness of the harbour, the fruitfullnes of the soyle, the largenes of the trees, and many other reasons...

Middleton Manuscript Mi X 1/2. University of Nottingham

The colonists all male were made up of masons, carpenters, blacksmiths and other apprentices to build fortifications and dwellings to prepare for the coming winter. The charter had stipulated that the settlers of Cuper's Cove were not to interfere with the operation of the migratory fishery in any way. It wasn't deemed a problem, for the Cuper's Cove area was not considered prime fishing grounds, but certainly over winter they would have time to prepare for the next year fishing season and they would be the first on those grounds.

Guy and his colonists began clearing the area and by May 1611 the colony consisted of a dwelling house and a store house contained within a 120 ft (37 m). x 90 ft (27 m). enclosure, a second dwelling house, a work house and a forge. Within the confines of the settlement were two saw pits and a wooden defense works upon which three cannons were mounted.

One of the first items of construction was to dig a cellar, which in recent excavations has determined it to be roughly 20 ft (6.1 m). across with a maximum depth of seven feet, walled-up with flat stone and back-filled with rubble. The dwellings were made of cobble and flagstone floors with some areas covered by wooden timbers and floor boards. The end of the first winter, a mild winter, the report back to England was very optimistic where Guy notes that the months of October and November are both warmer and drier than in England. The livestock they had brought from England had thrived and had added to their numbers.

The colonists built, along with the dwellings and support structures, six fishing vessels and a twelve tonne bark, Endeavour. Fortifications were by means of a palisade wall of local cut poles sixteen feet long set upright all around the perimeter of the settlement. The fortress was completed by the summer of 1612 to defend the plantation against the pirate Peter Easton.

=== Settlement expansion (1612–1613) ===
The plantation continued development and by 8 September 1612 a dwelling for Henry Crout and his ward Thomas Willoughby had begun. By the spring of 1613 at least sixteen structures were built on the site. Much of the land had been cleared for the planting of crops and to allow livestock to pasture.

John Guy had stayed at the colony during the winter of 1610 to 1611 and had returned to England in the autumn of 1611. Four of the colonists had died during the winter of 1610 to 1611. In the spring of 1612, Guy had returned, this time with more adventurers and livestock. Guy, an alderman and sound churchman, had also brought with him a clergyman, Rev. Erasmus Stourton.

During the winter of 1612 to 1613 sixty-two people were known to be at the plantation. That winter eight deaths were recorded, all apparently from scurvy. There was also a birth recorded, the first English child born in Newfoundland and what is now Canada. The child was born to Nicholas Guy and his wife on 27 March 1613.

=== Beothuk contact ===
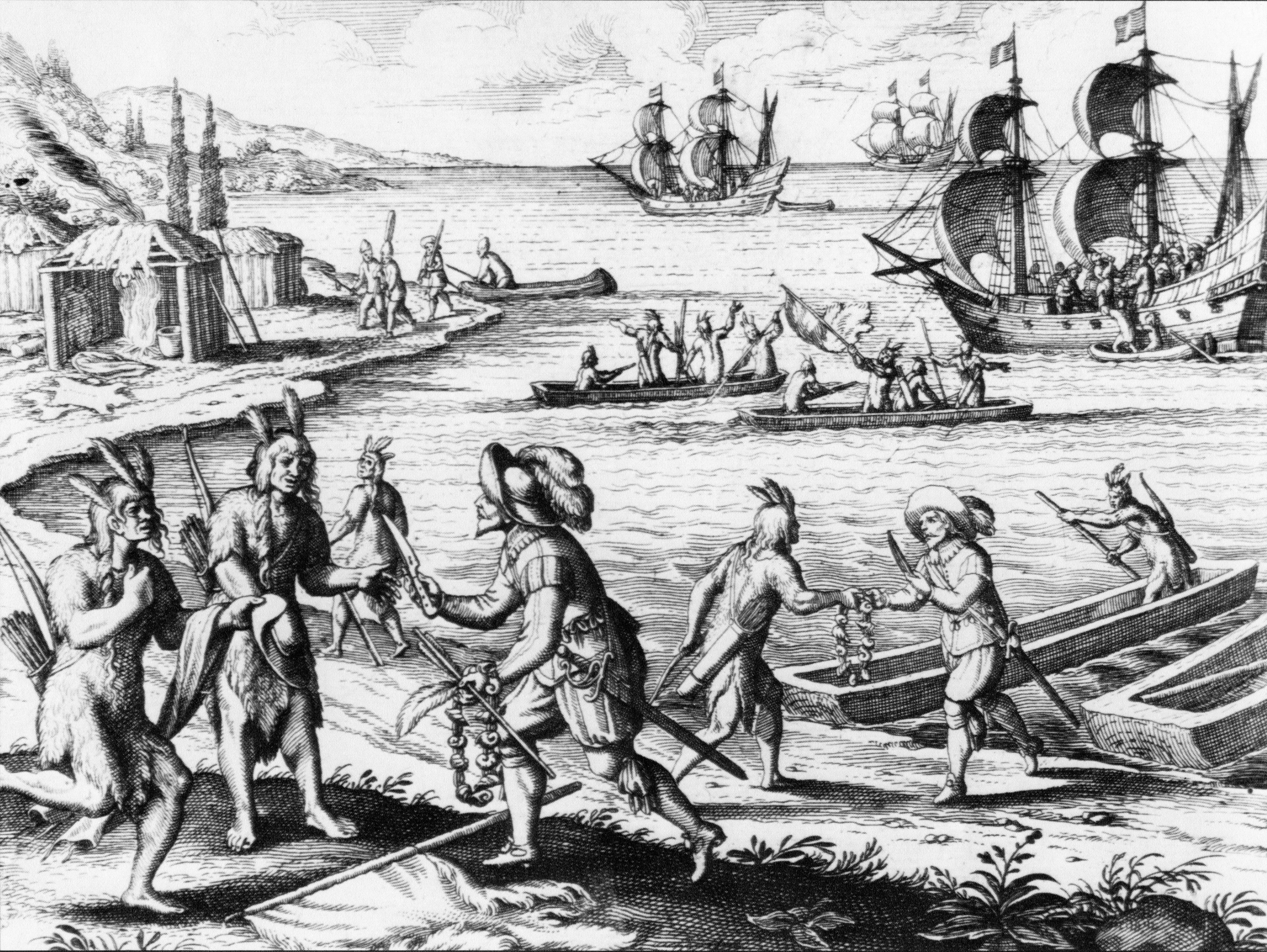
John Guy (colonial administrator) and his men interacting with Beothuk

No mention of the natives of Newfoundland, namely the Beothuk, is made in the petition of the charter of the Newfoundland Company, a fact that had helped speed it through the Privy Council. There was a brief notation in the charter that stated explicitly any contact with natives would be to convert them to Christianity. Guy had assumed that the natives had long since left Conception Bay, but he knew that they lived not far away. One reason for his construction of the bark Indeavour was to explore nearby Trinity Bay and to make contact with the Beothuk.

Two failed attempts to make contact with the Beothuk overland (see article on Henry Crout and construction of Crout's Way) Guy had readied his bark and one of his newly constructed fishing vessels to set off in search of the Beothuk at Trinity Bay. In October 1612, Guy, Crout and seventeen others set sail in both vessels in search of the Beothuks. They had entered Mount Eagle Bay (Hopeall) on October 22 and two days later they found several Beothuk houses in a place they called Savage Harbour located at Dildo Arm. They found a path leading to a freshwater pond that proved to also be a campground for the Beothuk. A modern excavation at this site called Russell's Point has yielded many artifacts of this campsite.

John Guy and his party eventually did meet with the Beothuk at a Bull Arm, where they shared gifts and a meal. The Beothuk had lit a fire to express their willingness to trade and they also produced a white flag made from a wolf skin.

=== Post colony use ===
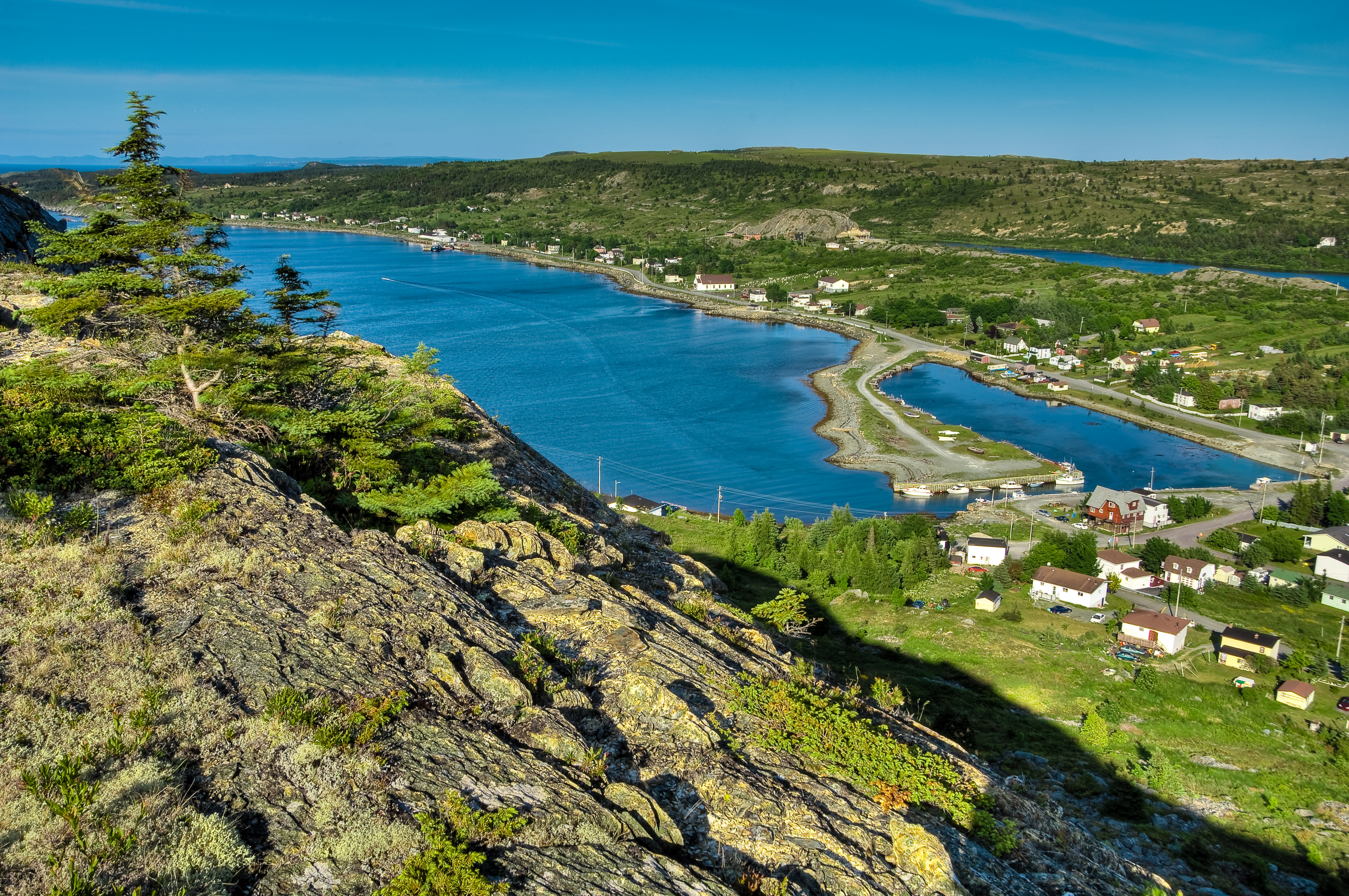
Today's town of Cupids

Captain John Mason was appointed the new Proprietary Governor of the colony in 1615, but he too grew tired of disputes with fishermen and with the difficulties of the terrain, and abandoned the colony in 1621 for New England.

Patuxet tribesman, Tisquantum (better known as Squanto) was brought here by Sir John Slany in 1617 and worked with Captain John Mason, governor of the Newfoundland Colony. While being here, he encountered a ship's captain by the name of Thomas Dermer, who had worked with both Sir Ferdinando Gorges and Captain John Smith. After staying for many months at this site, Squanto thought he would be able to return home to the modern-day American state of Massachusetts, but Dermer took him back to London to meet Gorges and ask for permission about the trip to Squanto's homeland. He eventually found a ship bounding for his homeland, but later discovered that his tribe had been all wiped out by an unknown disease.

There is some evidence that an unorganized settlement remained here possibly into the eighteenth century before finally being abandoned, although the cove remained a popular location for visiting fishermen. Cuper's Cove is now known as the Town of Cupids.

== Names and details of the original 39 colonists ==
- William Colston, brother-in-law of John Guy
- Richard Fletcher, master pilot
- John Guy
- Philip Guy, brother of John Guy
- John Morris, died 1 February 1610
- Thomas Percy, died 11 December 1610
- Thomas Stone, died 13 April 1611
- Marmaduke Whittington, died 15 February 1610 of smallpox

== See also ==
- List of communities in Newfoundland and Labrador
- Bristol's Hope
- British colonization of the Americas
