= Peter Easton =

English pirate

- Peter Eston
- Born: c. 1570; England
- Died: c. 1620; Savoy
- Occupation: Pirate
- Years active: 1602–1620
- Piratical career
- Allegiance: Kingdom of England; Duchy of Savoy
- Rank: Captain
- Base of operations: Newfoundland, Caribbean
- Commands: Happy Adventure

Peter Easton (c. 1570 – 1620 or after) was an English privateer and later pirate in the early 17th century. Conflicting accounts exist regarding his early life. By 1602, Easton had become a highly successful privateer, commissioned to protect English interests in Newfoundland.

The "most famous English pirate of the day", Easton's piracies ranged across the Atlantic from Ireland and Guinea to Newfoundland. He is best known today for his involvement in the early English settlement of Newfoundland, including the settlements at Harbour Grace and Ferryland from 1611 to 1614. One of the most successful of all pirates, he controlled such seapower that no sovereign or state could afford to ignore him, and he was never overtaken or captured by any fleet commissioned to hunt him down. However, he is not as well-known as some of the pirates from the late 17th and early 18th centuries.

== Early life ==
Very little is known about Easton's early life and some assertions are contradictory. He was born in England around 1570. One source calls Easton a man "of low birth", while another says that he was "late of London, gent." Primary sources are lacking and much of his early story consists of local folklore.

In 1602, Easton was in command of a convoy as a privateer with a commission from Elizabeth I of England to protect the Newfoundland fishing fleet. During these times, fishing vessels would carry arms and small cannons to protect the valuable cargo of fish from pirates and foreign vessels. Under his commission, he could legally press local fishermen into service for him. He could also attack the ships and wharves of the enemy as much as he wished, especially the much hated Spanish. Easton's flagship was Happy Adventure, from which he flew the Saint George's Cross at the masthead.

== Becoming a pirate ==
On 23 June 1604, after Elizabeth I was succeeded by James I, the king sued for peace with Spain and canceled all letters of commission to privateers. On hearing the news, Easton continued to attack vessels as though nothing had changed. In so doing, he had crossed the line into piracy.

On his flagship, Happy Adventure, Easton flew the St. George’s Cross and attacked Spanish ships for gold in the West Indies and the Mediterranean Sea, while in the meantime demanding and receiving protection money from English ships. In 1610, he blockaded the Bristol Channel, effectively controlling the shipping entering and leaving the western English ports. For the most part, he was acting on behalf of the powerful family of the Killigrews from Falmouth, Cornwall. They financed his expeditions and also took shares in his profits.

Easton arrived in the Newfoundland Colony in 1612 with ten pirate ships and made his headquarters at Harbour Grace. He raided and plundered both English and foreign vessels and the harbours of Newfoundland, press-ganging fishermen into his service along the way.

On one expedition, he plundered thirty ships in St. John's and held Sir Richard Whitbourne prisoner, releasing him on the condition that Whitbourne would go to England and obtain a pardon for Easton. The pardon was granted, but by this time, Easton had moved on to the Barbary Coast to harass the Spanish.

While in Newfoundland, Easton is estimated to have taken as many as 1,500 fishermen for his ships, most voluntarily. Easton continued to protect John Guy's colony at Cuper's Cove but did not allow him to establish another colony at Renews.

On one of his raids, Easton headed for the Azores. Stationing his fleet south and west of the islands, he planned to intercept the Spanish silver fleet. No details of the battle are known except that a few days later, Easton arrived in Tunis loaded with treasure and four Spanish ships in tow.

== Retirement to Savoy ==
Early in 1613 the Duke of Savoy issued a proclamation making Nice and Villefranche free ports and offering asylum and safe conduct to all pirates. On 20 February 1613 Easton sailed into Villefranche at the head of four ships and 900 soldiers, leaving eight more vessels outside the Strait of Gibraltar. Easton met with the duke and agreed to invest 100,000 crowns in Savoy, offering to the duke a percentage of the proceeds in return for an annual income. William Parkhurst, an English agent in Savoy, wrote of him:

"This Easton hath since beene with me: hee seemeth to have the age of 40 yeares: his countenance is rude and savadge (which the Duke tooke notice off), his speech and carriage is slow, subtile, and guilty..."

Easton ingratiated himself with the Duke of Savoy by taking part in a raid on the Duchy of Mantua. Easton was granted a pension of £4000 a year and was sworn to faithful service, becoming a Catholic, marrying an heiress and being created a marquis of the Duchy of Savoy. Despite this, he remained known at court as Il cosaro Inglese ("the English corsair").

Within a month of Easton's arrival in Savoy he had dismissed most of his company. Although he took part in a Savoyard naval attack on Venice later in 1613, he commanded French crews and ships. The expedition was not successful and after this Easton took little part in maritime affairs. Nevertheless, he remained in the duke's employ until at least 1620. His subsequent fate is unrecorded.
