= John Guy (colonial administrator) =

English merchant adventurer and politician

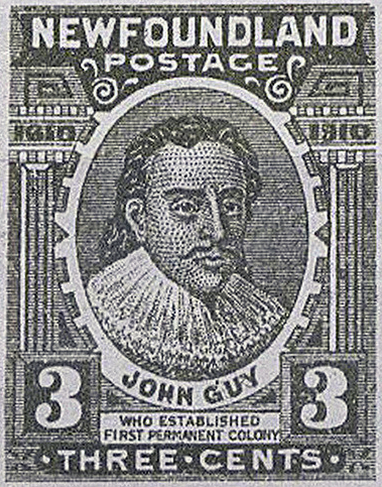

1st Proprietary Governor Cuper's Cove
- In office 1610–1614
- Monarch: James I
- Succeeded by: John Mason

Member of the England Parliament for Bristol
- In office 1621–1624 Serving with John Baker
- Preceded by: John Whitson; Thomas James
- Succeeded by: Sir Nicholas Hyde; John Whitson

Personal details
- Born: 25 December 1568 Bristol, England
- Died: February 1629 (aged 60) Bristol, England
- Occupation: colonist and politician

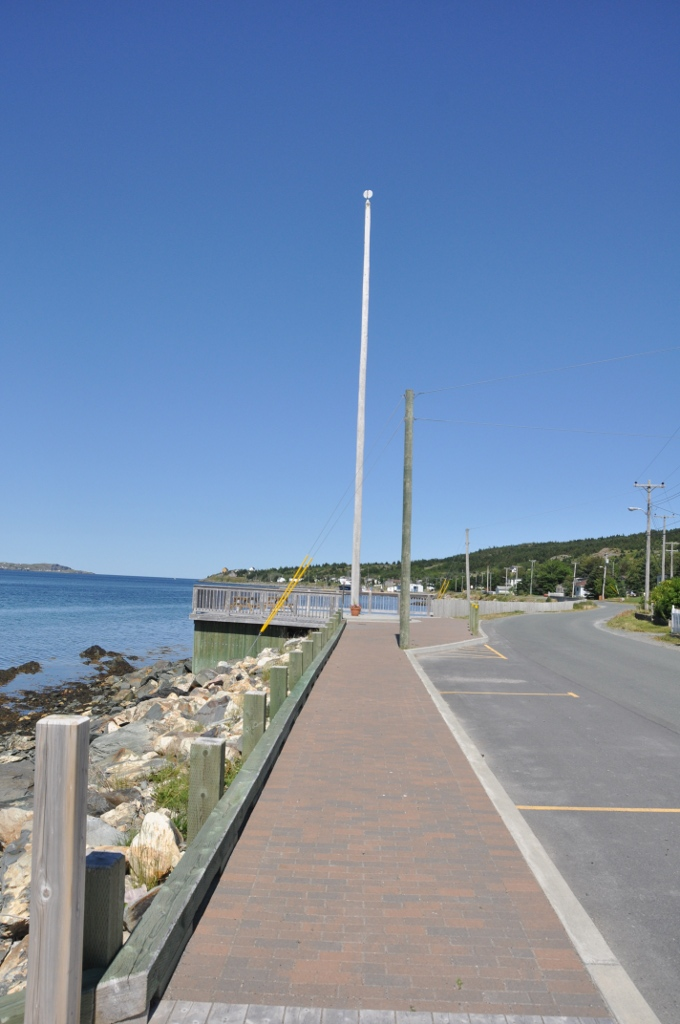
The John Guy Flag Site in Cupids, created in 1910 to mark the settlement's 300th anniversary. The 26-metre (85 ft) flagstaff is used to fly a giant Union Jack.

John Guy (25 December 1568 – February 1629) was an English merchant, explorer, and politician who sat in the House of Commons from 1621 to 1624. He was the first proprietary governor of Newfoundland Colony, the second attempt to establish a colony on Newfoundland.

== Early life ==
Guy was the eldest son and second child of Thomas Guy, a cordwainer (shoemaker) of Bristol. He was born on 25 December 1568, and baptized a week later on 1 January 1569 at St Mary le Port Church, Bristol. He spent his youth growing up amongst his siblings, and was well educated for his times; he managed in later life to write poetry in Latin. He was apprenticed to a yeoman farmer, and on his parents' deaths, he inherited the family shoemaking business, he had various farming interests, and served as a factor representing the interests of the Bristol merchant community overseas for a period in Spain, where he mastered the art of navigation. Guy became a merchant and was admitted to the corporation of the city in 1603, as a Councillor of Bristol. He was also appointed the Sheriff of Bristol for the year 1605–06. During the emergency of 1605 when the country was threatened with invasion from overseas, he was appointed one of Rear-Admirals in the Royal Navy, as Bristol was at the time one of the two main naval ports in the country. In 1607 he was also appointed Surveyor of Bristol, a post which gave him the responsibility for obtaining provisions for the naval vessels that visited the port of Bristol.

== Colonist ==
In 1608 Guy and other members of the Society of Merchant Venturers, decided to act upon the letter received by the mayor from Chief Justice Sir John Popham concerning the colonisation of Newfoundland. Since John Cabot had discovered the island and Sir Humphrey Gilbert had formally taken possession of it for Elizabeth I of England, the merchants of the city had a special interest in Newfoundland, but there had been little attempt to exploit and colonise the island. The merchants decided not to embark on the scheme without the co-operation of King James VI of Scotland and Elizabeth I of England, which was forthcoming. Guy visited the island in 1608 to scout possible locations for a settlement, selecting Cuper's Cove (present day Cupids, Newfoundland and Labrador) as the site of the colony. In 1609, he put forward a proposal "to animate the English to plant [or colonise] in Newfoundland." The merchants of Bristol and London took up the idea with enthusiasm and a list of contributions was made out with Guy and others subscribing twenty marks a year for five years. The idea was popular with members of the court. Amongst the 50 shareholders were John Guy and his younger brother Philip Guy, in effect, Guy had the largest shareholding invested in the venture. On 27 April 1610 James I granted a charter to Henry Howard, 1st Earl of Northampton, Keeper of the Privy Seal, and others including John Guy and his brother Philip Guy, which incorporated them as the "Treasurer and Company of Adventurers and Planters of the Cities of London and Bristol, for the purpose of colonising Newfoundland, and comprehending as their sphere of action the southern and eastern parts of the new found land between 46° and 52° N. L."

Guy was appointed governor in 1610 by the London and Bristol Company and arrived at Cuper's Cove in August of that year with colonists, grain and livestock, after a quick passage of 21 days. Thirty-nine colonists spent the winter of 1610–1611 in the colony. During his governorship the colonists built and fortified the settlement, explored the area and planted crops. Guy returned to England in 1611 leaving William Colston - one of his brothers-in-law, and distantly related to the family of Edward Colston, and his brother Philip to manage the colony, as the first two Lieutenant-Governors of the Colony. Back in England, he was elected to the Bristol Society of Merchant Venturers, and he was then elected as the treasurer of the merchant venturers from 1611 to 1612 and then returned the next year with more livestock and female settlers.

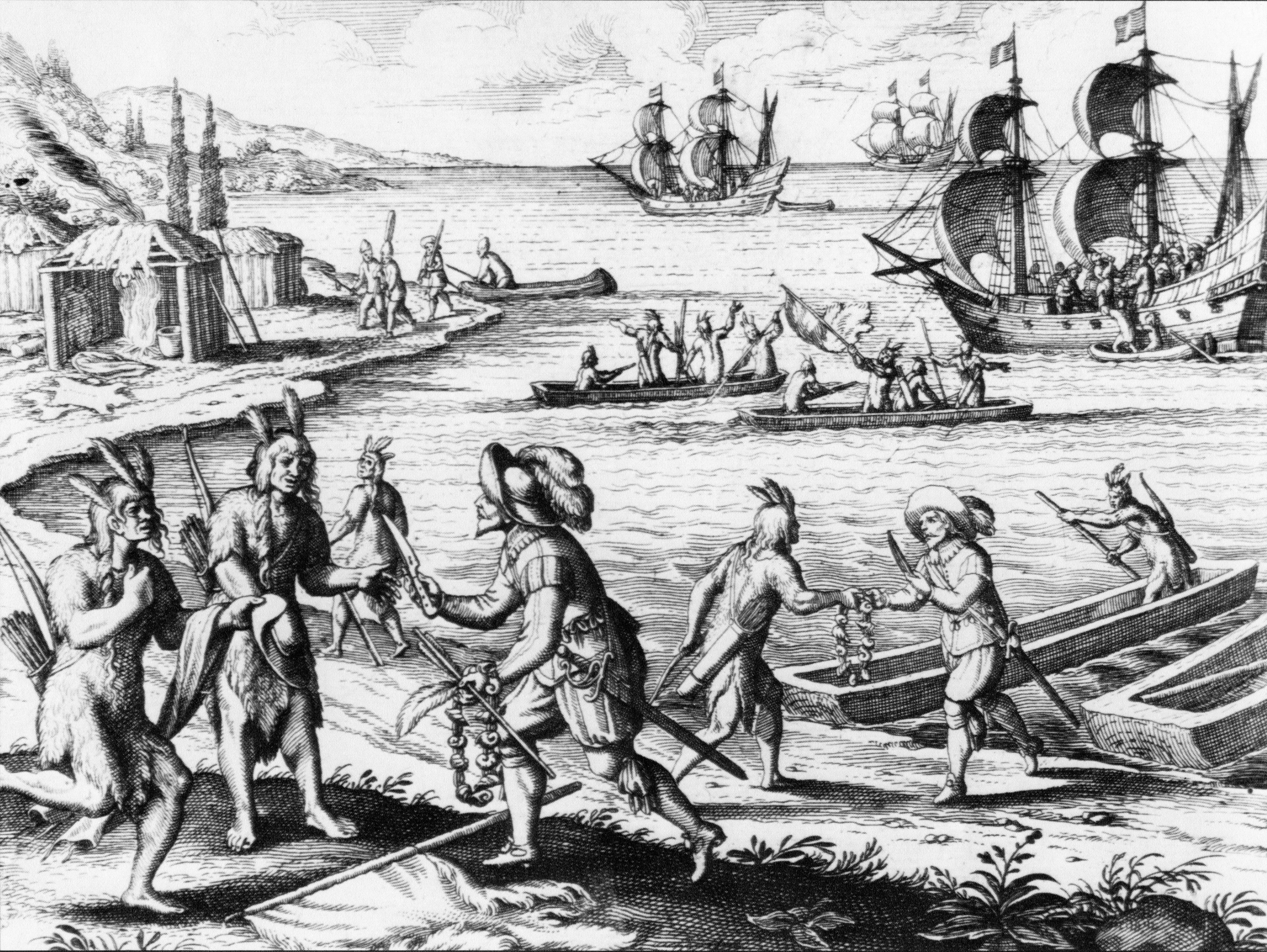
Guy and his men interacting with Beothuk Indians in Newfoundland

In 1612, the actions of the English pirate Peter Easton convinced Guy to abandon a second colony established at Renews in the spring of that year and strengthen the fortifications at Cuper's Cove. At one point, Guy and three other colonists in a canoe were attacked by the pirates and captured; the colonist with the musket was injured. The pirates were discussing the best way to execute John Guy and his men when they escaped with the help of a former colonist who had decided to throw in his lot with the pirates but who remembered the help John Guy had given him in the past and wasn't prepared to stand aside whilst his former friend was possibly murdered.

The colonists built a boat called the Endeavour, which Guy used to lead a voyage into Trinity Bay in the autumn of 1612 in an attempt to contact and establish a fur trade with the Beothuk, the native inhabitants of the island. On 6 November, Guy's party met, shared a meal and exchanged gifts with a group of Beothuk somewhere in Bull Arm, Trinity Bay.

== Politician ==
Guy returned to England in April 1613. In that same year, a cousin of the first Governor, Nicholas Guy, became the father of the first son born in Newfoundland, from whom most of the current Guys now living in Canada are descended. John Guy returned to Newfoundland in 1614–15, when he had the indignity of being sent home in irons by the second Governor of the Colony, John Mason, who didn't really want the previous Governor being around, as he felt threatened by Guy's knowledge and respect amongst the colonists. His withdrawal was also in part the result of the troubles caused by the pirates led by Peter Easton. Five years later a visitor to Newfoundland wrote that the Bristol citizens had "planted a large circuit of the country, and builded there many fine houses, and done many other good services" Guy became disillusioned due to the lack of support from the London merchants, and remained in Bristol, though he later received a grant of land in Newfoundland which he named Sea Forest, and which he divided amongst his younger sons in his will in 1624.

In 1618, Guy became Mayor of Bristol, and in 1619 he was appointed an Alderman of Bristol, a post he held until his death in 1629, and he was also a member of the Bristol Merchant Venturer's Society Court of Assistants in 1620 and 1621. John Guy in his capacity as an admiral in the Royal Navy fought against Turkish pirates operating in the English Channel during 1620, for which the grateful merchants of Bristol, provided him with a sum of money as a vote of thanks for his efforts. He was elected as one of the 2 Members of Parliament for Bristol in 1620, and remained its MP until 1621. In a debate on 27 February on the scarcity of money he spoke of the abundance of English coin in foreign parts, and recommended that the exportation of money should be forbidden. He received and wrote several letters about the interests of the merchant venturers company. His fellow MP for Bristol - John Whitson, the founder of the Red Maids School, Bristol - wrote in October 1621 on the "business of Sir Ferdinando Gorges" referring to the restraint of trade with New England as a result of articles and orders of the president and council for New England, which the merchants "in noe sorte did like".

In February 1622, Guy wrote about his 'conference with the lord treasurer and others concerning the new imposition of wines and composition of grocery. He was the Master of the Bristol Merchant Venturer's Society for 1622–23, during which time his eldest son-in-law was admitted to the position of Junior Warden in the Bristol Merchant Venturer's Society. In 1624, he was re-elected MP for Bristol, and remained the MP for Bristol until he decided to retire from Parliament on the death of James I. Guy was actively involved in the House of Commons - sitting on Committees and introducing a private Members Bill to reduce interest rates by 2% from 10% to 8%. He was an elected as a Member of the Court of Assistants again from 1624 to 1628 for the Bristol Merchant Venturer's Society.

Guy was buried in St Stephen's Church, which was known as the church for the Bristol Merchant Venturer's Society. The register books of the church show that his burial took place on 23 February 1629. The will of his son John (who died in 1640, from the plague which he caught whilst studying at the Middle Temple) calls for the erection of a monument for his father in St Stephen's Church. There is no monument to John Guy anywhere in Bristol, but his name is recorded in the list of mayors of Bristol in the Bristol City Council House for the year 1618. John Guy's widow Ann survived him until 1660, by which time she had outlived all but 2 of their 10 children (five sons and five daughters) -- their eldest daughter and youngest son still remaining alive.

== Legacy ==
Archaeological excavations indicate that Cuper's Cove continued to be occupied throughout the 17th century, and was never abandoned. Today the town of Cupids has a population of about 700.

== See also ==
- List of lieutenant governors of Newfoundland and Labrador

Parliament of England
Preceded by John Whitson; Thomas James	Member of Parliament for Bristol; 1621–1624; With: John Barker	Succeeded by Nicholas Hyde; John Whitson
Preceded by	Proprietary Governor of Cuper's Cove; 1610–1614	Succeeded by John Mason
