= 1st General Assembly of Newfoundland =

Colony of Newfoundland legislature

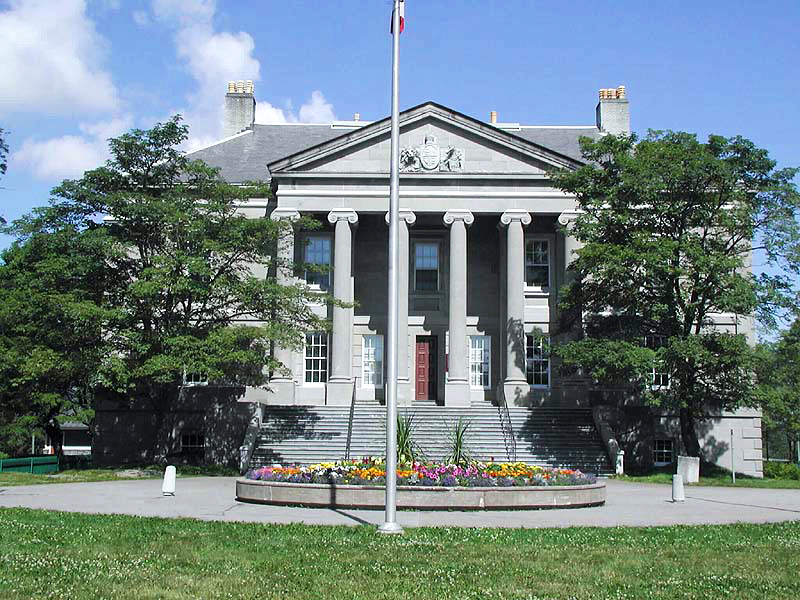

History
- Founded: 1832
- Disbanded: 1836
- Preceded by: Created
- Succeeded by: 2nd General Assembly of Newfoundland

Leadership
- Speaker: John Bingley Garland (1833); Thomas Bennett (from 1834)

Elections
- Last election: 1832 Newfoundland general election
- Next election: 1837 Newfoundland general election

The members of the 1st General Assembly of Newfoundland were elected in the Newfoundland general election held in November 1832, the first general election for the colony. The general assembly sat from January 1, 1833 until 1836.

John Bingley Garland was chosen as speaker. Thomas Bennett replaced Garland as speaker in 1834.

The first session of the general assembly met in a tavern and lodging house in St. John's operated by a Mary Travers; the elected assembly met on the ground floor and the appointed Board of Council met on the upper floor. A different location, the Old Court House, was used for the second and subsequent sessions.

In 1833, the assembly passed a Revenue Bill which would provide much-needed funds to support the operation of the colony. The bill was subsequently rejected by the Legislative Council. The governor and British Government intervened in support of the legislation, which was submitted again and this time approved by the council.

Sir Thomas John Cochrane, although he had been opposed to the concept of representative government in the colony, became its first civil governor and was responsible for the implementation of the new system of government. The governor's support was required on any new legislation and he had the power to prorogue the assembly. Cochrane was removed from office in 1834 and replaced by Sir Henry Prescott.

A Newfoundland general election was held in 1836 but the results were set aside by Chief Justice Henry John Boulton because the writs for the election did not bear the required Great Seal. A new election was called for the following year.

== Members of the Assembly ==
The following members were elected to the assembly in 1832:

Member	Electoral district	Affiliation (Note: Indicates political orientation rather than party membership)	First elected
William Brown	Bonavista Bay	Conservative	1832
William Hooper	Burin	Conservative	1832
Robert Pack	Conception Bay	Liberal	1832
Peter Brown	Conception Bay	Liberal	1832
Charles Cozens	Conception Bay	Conservative	1832
James Power	Conception Bay	Liberal	1832
Robert Carter	Ferryland	Conservative	1832
Thomas Bennett	Fogo	Conservative	1832
Newman Wright Hoyles	Fortune Bay	Conservative	1832
Roger Forstall Sweetman	Placentia and St. Mary's	Liberal	1832
John Wills Martin	Placentia and St. Mary's	Conservative	1832
John Kent	St. John's	Liberal	1832
William Thomas	St. John's	Conservative	1832
Patrick Kough	St. John's	Conservative	1832
William Carson (1833)	St. John's	Liberal	1833
John Bingley Garland	Trinity Bay	Conservative	1832
William Bickford Row (1833)	Trinity Bay	Conservative	1833

== By-elections ==
By-elections were held to replace members for various reasons:

Electoral district	Member elected	Affiliation	Election date	Reason
St. John's	William Carson (Note: Acclaimed)	liberal	1833	W Thomas named to Executive Council
Trinity Bay	William Bickford Row	conservative	1833	JB Garland named to Executive Council
