= 1842 Newfoundland general election =

Election in the Colony of Newfoundland

- December 20, 1842

15 seats of the Newfoundland House of Assembly 8 seats needed for a majority
	First party	Second party
Party	Liberal	Conservative
Last election	13	2
Seats won	8	7
Seat change	▼5	▲5
Popular vote	9,800 (Note: Note that this does not include the vote totals for the district of Placentia and St. Mary's, as the full results of those contests are not available.)	6,558
Percentage	59.91%	40.09%
Swing	▼37.77% (Note: Based on incomplete figures from the 1836 election, as no votes were known to have been cast in the 1837 election.)	▲37.77%
- Results by district

The 1842 Newfoundland general election was held on December 20, 1842, to elect the members of the 3rd General Assembly of Newfoundland in the Newfoundland Colony. The original constitution was suspended following conflict between the House of Assembly and the Legislative Council, and Governor John Harvey combined the two legislatures into an amalgamated assembly. This was the first election in Newfoundland where the majority of districts were contested by candidates from two different factions.

Although the Conservatives saw more success in this election, the Liberal reformers narrowly held on to a majority government.

== Results ==
Party	1837	Candidates	Seats won	Seat change	% of seats (% change)	Popular vote	% of vote (% change)
Liberal	13	13	8	▼5	53.33% (▼33.33%)	9,800 (Note: Given that 336 votes were cast for the leading Liberal candidate in the district of Placentia and St. Mary's and that the Conservative candidate in said district was not elected, it is evident that between 9,941 and 10,136 votes were cast for the government candidates in this election.)	59.91% (▼37.77%)
Conservative	2	11	7	▲5	46.67% (▲33.33%)	6,558 (Note: Including the 140 votes for the Conservative candidate in the district of Placentia and St. Mary's, a total of 6,698 votes were cast for the opposition candidates in this election.)	40.09% (▲37.77%)
Totals	15	24	15	Steady	100%	16,358 (Note: Given that at least 617 votes were cast in the district of Placentia and St. Mary's, it is evident that a minimum of 16,975 votes were cast in this election.)	100%

== Results by district ==
- † indicates that the incumbent did not run again.
- ‡ indicates that the incumbent ran in a different district.

=== St. John's ===
Electoral district	Candidates		Incumbent
Electoral district	Liberal (historical)	Conservative (historical)	Incumbent
St. John's	Laurence O'Brien; 1,629; 20.23%	Walter R. Grieve; 1,161; 14.42%	William Carson
St. John's	John Nugent; 1,571; 19.51%	Thomas Bennett; 1,127; 13.99%	John Kent†
St. John's	William Carson; 1,539; 19.11%	Patrick Kough; 1,027; 12.75%	Laurence O'Brien

=== Avalon Peninsula ===
Electoral district	Candidates			Incumbent
Electoral district	Liberal (historical)	Conservative (historical)	Other	Incumbent
Conception Bay	James Prendergast; 1,344; 17.50%	Thomas Ridley; 1,425; 18.56%	Daniel O'Connell (Independent Liberal); 227; 2.96%	Peter Brown
Conception Bay	Edmund Hanrahan; 1,325; 17.25%	John Munn; 1,405; 18.30%	Daniel O'Connell (Independent Liberal); 227; 2.96%	Vacant (Note: Anthony Godfrey had been elected in 1837, but he died while in office in 1840.)
Conception Bay	John McCarthy; 1,015; 13.22%	John Munn; 1,405; 18.30%	Daniel O'Connell (Independent Liberal); 227; 2.96%	John McCarthy
Conception Bay	Peter Brown; 938; 12.22%	John Munn; 1,405; 18.30%	Daniel O'Connell (Independent Liberal); 227; 2.96%	James Power†
Ferryland	Peter Winser; 258; 47.34%	Thomas Glen; 287; 52.66%		Peter Winser
Placentia and St. Mary's (Note: Full results for this district are not available.)	John Dillon; 336	John Barron; 140		Patrick Doyle†
Placentia and St. Mary's	Simon Morris; Total unknown	John Barron; 140		John Nugent‡ (ran in St. John's)

=== Eastern and Southern Newfoundland ===
Electoral district	Candidates		Incumbent
Electoral district	Liberal (historical)	Conservative (historical)	Incumbent
Bonavista Bay		Robert Carter; Won by acclamation	Hugh Emerson†
Burin (Note: These figures are according to a controverted elections application made by the Conservative candidate Winton, which claimed that over a hundred voters had been prevented from going to the polls due to threats of violence.)	Clement Benning; 241; 65.67%	Henry Winton; 126; 34.33%	Henry Butler†
Fortune Bay		Bryan Robinson; Won by acclamation	William B. Row†
Trinity Bay		Richard Barnes; Won by acclamation	Thomas Moore†
Twillingate and Fogo		John Slade; Won by acclamation	Edward Dwyer†
