= 1836 Newfoundland general election =

Election in the Colony of Newfoundland

- October 24 – November 15, 1836

15 seats of the Newfoundland House of Assembly 8 seats needed for a majority
	First party	Second party
Party	Liberal	Conservative
Last election	5	10
Seats won	12	3
Seat change	▲7	▼7
Popular vote	295 (Note: Full results are only available for the district of Conception Bay, where voting was interrupted by violence on the first day of polling.)	7
Percentage	97.68%	2.32%
- Results by district

The 1836 Newfoundland general election was held from October 24 to November 15, 1836 in the Colony of Newfoundland. The Liberal reformers secured control of the government and defeated the governing Conservative party. However, the results of the election were later set aside by Chief Justice Henry John Boulton after he discovered some of the writs from the election had not been marked with the official seal. Some felt that this was a pretext used to justify holding another election because Liberal reformers had dominated the assembly.

== Results ==
Party	1832	Candidates	Seats won	Seat change	% of seats (% change)	Popular vote	% of vote (% change)
Liberal	5	13	12	▲7	80.00% (▲46.67%)	295 (Note: Given that the unsuccessful Conservative candidate in Trinity received 97 votes on the first day of polling, it is evident that the Liberal candidate there received at least 98 votes, meaning that at least 393 votes were cast for the opposition candidates in this election.)	97.68%
Conservative	10	6	3	▼7	20.00% (▼46.67%)	7 (Note: Given that the Conservative candidate in Trinity received 97 votes on the first day of polling, it is evident that at least 104 votes were cast for the government candidates in this election.)	2.32%
Totals	15	20	15	Steady	100%	302	100%

== Results by district ==
- † indicates that the incumbent did not run again.
- ‡ indicates that the incumbent ran in a different district.
- $ indicates that the incumbent initially ran for re-election, but they later chose to withdraw

=== St. John's ===
Electoral district	Candidates		Incumbent
Electoral district	Conservative (historical)	Liberal (historical)	Incumbent
St. John's	(Note: Kough, Nicholas Gill, and James Grieve all initially ran as Conservative candidates in the district of St. John's, but they all withdrew prior to election day due to threats of violence.)	John Kent; Won by acclamation	John Kent
St. John's	(Note: Kough, Nicholas Gill, and James Grieve all initially ran as Conservative candidates in the district of St. John's, but they all withdrew prior to election day due to threats of violence.)	William Carson; Won by acclamation	William Carson
St. John's	(Note: Kough, Nicholas Gill, and James Grieve all initially ran as Conservative candidates in the district of St. John's, but they all withdrew prior to election day due to threats of violence.)	Patrick Morris; Won by acclamation	Patrick Kough$

=== Avalon Peninsula ===
Electoral district	Candidates		Incumbent
Electoral district	Conservative (historical)	Liberal (historical)	Incumbent
Conception Bay	Thomas Ridley; 5; 1.66% (Note: Prowse and Ridley both withdrew from the race shortly after voting commenced due to violence at the polls on the first day of voting.)	Peter Brown; 76; 25.17%	Robert Pack
Conception Bay	Robert Prowse; 2; 0.66%	Anthony Godfrey; 73; 24.17%	Charles Cozens†
Conception Bay	(Note: Thomas Newell initially ran as a Conservative candidate, but he withdrew prior to the first day of polling.)	Robert Pack; 73; 24.17%	James Power
Conception Bay	(Note: Thomas Newell initially ran as a Conservative candidate, but he withdrew prior to the first day of polling.)	James Power; 73; 24.17%	Peter Brown
Ferryland		Patrick Morris (Note: Morris was elected for both the districts of Ferryland and St. John's. No by-election was held as the House of Assembly did not meet before the next election was called in 1837, but Morris evidently chose to remain in St. John's as he did not run for re-election in Ferryland.); Won by acclamation	Robert Carter†
Placentia and St. Mary's		Patrick Doyle; Won by acclamation	John Martin†
Placentia and St. Mary's		John Nugent; Won by acclamation	Roger Sweetman†

=== Eastern and Southern Newfoundland ===
Electoral district	Candidates			Incumbent
Electoral district	Conservative (historical)	Liberal (historical)	Other	Incumbent
Bonavista Bay (Note: Returns are not available for this district.)	Robert Job	? Douglas	Hugh Emerson (Independent Conservative)	William Brown†
Burin		John Shea; Won by acclamation		William Hooper†
Fortune Bay	William B. Row; Won by acclamation			Newman Hoyles
Trinity Bay (Note: Full results are not available for this district.)	Archibald Graham; At least 97 votes	Thomas Moore; At least 98 votes		William Row‡ (ran in Fortune Bay)
Twillingate and Fogo	Thomas Bennett; Won by acclamation			Thomas Bennett
