= 3rd General Assembly of Newfoundland =

Colony of Newfoundland legislature

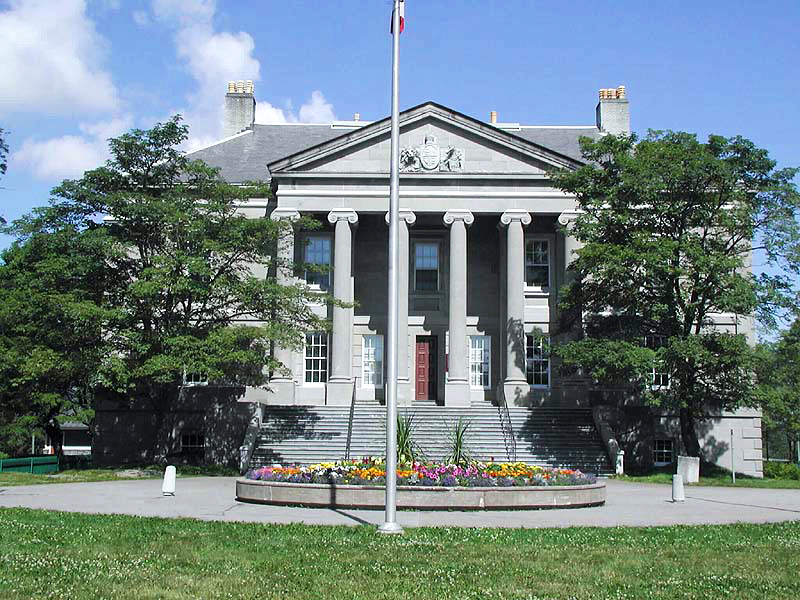

History
- Founded: 1843
- Disbanded: 1848
- Preceded by: 2nd General Assembly of Newfoundland
- Succeeded by: 4th General Assembly of Newfoundland

Leadership
- Speaker: James Crowdy

Elections
- Last election: 1842 Newfoundland general election

The members of the 3rd General Assembly of Newfoundland were elected in the Newfoundland general election held in 1842. The General Assembly sat from January 14, 1843 to 1848.

The General Assembly had not sat from 1841 to 1843 as the colony's constitution had been suspended. Following the passing of the Newfoundland Act 1842 by the British Parliament, the elected assembly and appointed Legislative Council were combined into a single unicameral legislature. The legislature continue to meet at the Old Court House until 1846 when that building was destroyed in a fire; for the next two years, the legislature met in a classroom in an orphan asylum.

James Crowdy was chosen as speaker.

In 1843, a new Education Act was passed which redistributed education funding between separate Protestant and Catholic school systems.

Sir Henry Prescott served as civil governor of Newfoundland until 1846. Robert Law served as colonial administrator until the arrival of Sir John Le Marchant in April 1847.

== Members of the Assembly ==
The following members were elected to the assembly in 1843:

Member	Electoral district	Affiliation	First elected
Robert Carter	Bonavista Bay	Conservative	1842
Clement Pitt Benning	Burin	Liberal	1842
Thomas Ridley	Conception Bay	Conservative	1842
John Munn	Conception Bay	Conservative	1842
James Luke Prendergast	Conception Bay	Liberal	1842
Edmund Hanrahan	Conception Bay	Liberal	1842
Thomas Glen	Ferryland	Liberal	1842
John Slade (Note: Elected after general election)	Fogo	Conservative	1842
Bryan Robinson	Fortune Bay	Conservative	1842
John Dillon	Placentia and St. Mary's	Liberal	1842
Simon Morris	Placentia and St. Mary's	Liberal	1842
Laurence O'Brien	St. John's	Liberal	1840
John Valentine Nugent	St. John's	Liberal	1842
William Carson	St. John's	Liberal	1833
Robert John Parsons (1843)	St. John's	Liberal	1843
Richard Barnes	Trinity Bay	Conservative	1842
Thomas Bulley Job (1846)	Trinity Bay	Conservative	1846

== By-elections ==
By-elections were held to replace members for various reasons:

Electoral district	Member elected	Affiliation	Election date	Reason
St. John's	Robert John Parsons	Liberal	1843	W Carson died February 26, 1843
Trinity Bay	Thomas Bulley Job	Conservative	1846	R Barnes died September 3, 1846

== Members of the Legislative Council ==
The following members were appointed to the Legislative Council:

Member	Role
James Simms	Attorney general
James Crowdy	Colonial secretary
John Dunscombe	
William Thomas	Colonial treasurer
William Bickford Row	
James William Tobin	
Joseph Noad	Surveyor general
Charles Fox Bennett	
John Kent	
