= 2nd General Assembly of Newfoundland =

Colony of Newfoundland legislature

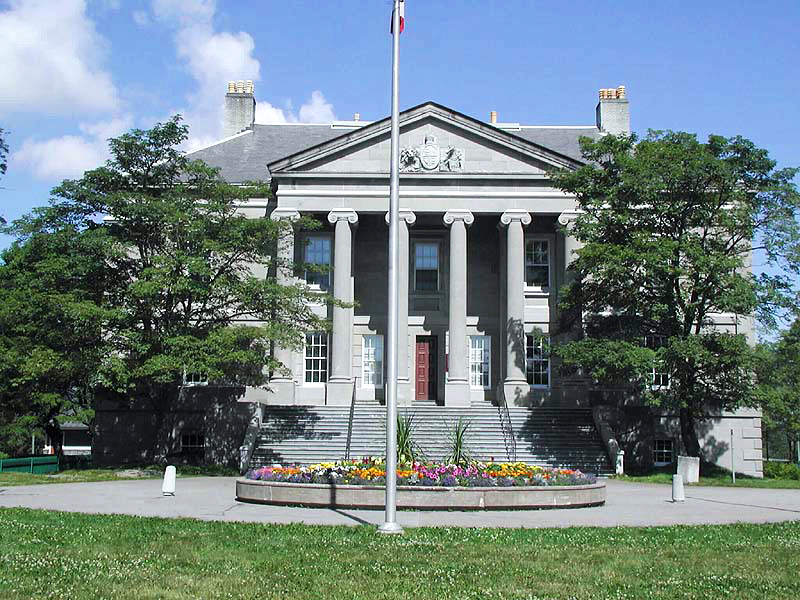

History
- Founded: 1837
- Disbanded: 1841
- Preceded by: 1st General Assembly of Newfoundland
- Succeeded by: 3rd General Assembly of Newfoundland

Leadership
- Speaker: Thomas Bennett (until 1837); William Carson (1838-1841)

Elections
- Last election: 1837 Newfoundland general election
- Next election: 1842 Newfoundland general election

The members of the 2nd General Assembly of Newfoundland were elected in the Newfoundland general election held in May 1837. The general assembly sat from July 3, 1837 to 1841.

The assembly continue to meet at the Old Court House.

William Carson was chosen as speaker.

An Education Act passed in 1836 established a public education system in the province.

In 1838, Edward Kielley was alleged to have threatened and insulted John Kent, a member of the assembly, regarding remarks made by Kent in the assembly. The assembly considered these actions to violate the parliamentary privilege of the Newfoundland legislature and ordered Kielley arrested. The Supreme Court of Newfoundland upheld the actions of the assembly but in 1842 the ruling was overturned by the Judicial committee of the British Privy Council which ruled that the privileges of the British House of Commons were not transferred to colonial legislatures.

Sir Henry Prescott served as civil governor of Newfoundland.

== Members of the Assembly ==
The following members were elected to the assembly in 1837:

Member	Electoral district	Affiliation (Note: Indicates political orientation rather than party membership)	First elected
Hugh A. Emerson	Bonavista Bay	Conservative	1837
Henry G. Butler	Burin	Liberal	1837
Peter Brown	Conception Bay	Liberal	1832
John McCarthy	Conception Bay	Liberal	1837
Anthony Godfrey	Conception Bay	Liberal	1837
James Power	Conception Bay	Liberal	1832
Peter Winser	Ferryland	Liberal	1837
Edward James Dwyer	Fogo	Conservative	1837
William Bickford Row	Fortune Bay	Conservative	1837
Patrick Doyle	Placentia and St. Mary's	Liberal	1837
John Valentine Nugent	Placentia and St. Mary's	Liberal	1837
William Carson	St. John's	Liberal	1833
John Kent	St. John's	Liberal	1832
Patrick Morris	St. John's	Liberal	1837
Laurence O'Brien (1840)	St. John's	Liberal	1840
Thomas Fitzgibbon Moore	Trinity Bay	Conservative	1837

== By-elections ==
By-elections were held to replace members for various reasons:

Electoral district	Member elected	Affiliation	Election date	Reason
Conception Bay	none (Note: No return due to riots)	n/a	1840	A Godfrey died
St. John's	Laurence O'Brien	liberal	1840	P Morris named to Executive Council
