= 1837 Newfoundland general election =

Election in the Colony of Newfoundland

- May 8–25, 1837

15 seats of the Newfoundland House of Assembly 8 seats needed for a majority
	First party	Second party
Party	Liberal	Conservative
Last election	12	3
Seats won	13	2
Seat change	▲1	▼1
Popular vote	0 (Note: All of the candidates won by acclamation, and no votes were cast in this election as a result.)	0
Percentage	0.00%	0.00%
- Results by district

The 1837 Newfoundland general election was held from May 8 to May 25, 1837 to elect members of the 2nd General Assembly of Newfoundland in the Newfoundland Colony. The results of the previous election had been set aside by Chief Justice Henry John Boulton after he discovered some of the writs from the previous election had not been marked with the official seal.

Most of the incumbents ran for re-election and the Liberal reformers retained their control over the government. Only the district of Twillingate and Fogo changed hands. All of the candidates appear to have won by acclamation.

== Results ==
Party	1836	Candidates	Seats won	Seat change	% of seats (% change)	Popular vote	% of vote
Liberal	12	13	13	▲1	86.67% (▲6.67%)	0	0.00%
Conservative	3	2	2	▼1	13.33% (▼6.67%)	0	0.00%
Totals	15	15	15	Steady	100%	0	100%

== Results by district ==
- † indicates that the incumbent did not run again.
- ‡ indicates that the incumbent ran in a different district.

=== St. John's ===
Electoral district	Candidates	Incumbent
Electoral district	Liberal (historical)	Incumbent
St. John's	William Carson; Won by acclamation	William Carson
St. John's	John Kent; Won by acclamation	John Kent
St. John's	Patrick Morris; Won by acclamation	Patrick Morris

=== Avalon Peninsula ===
Electoral district	Candidates	Incumbent
Electoral district	Liberal (historical)	Incumbent
Conception Bay	John McCarthy; Won by acclamation	Robert Pack†
Conception Bay	James Power; Won by acclamation	James Power
Conception Bay	Peter Brown; Won by acclamation	Peter Brown
Conception Bay	Anthony Godfrey; Won by acclamation	Anthony Godfrey
Ferryland	Peter Winser; Won by acclamation	Patrick Morris‡ (Note: Morris had been elected for both of the districts of Ferryland and St. John's in 1836.) (ran in St. John's)
Placentia and St. Mary's	Patrick Doyle; Won by acclamation	Patrick Doyle
Placentia and St. Mary's	John Nugent; Won by acclamation	John Nugent

=== Eastern and Southern Newfoundland ===
Electoral district	Candidates		Incumbent
Electoral district	Liberal (historical)	Conservative (historical)	Incumbent
Bonavista Bay		Hugh Emerson; Won by acclamation	Robert Job†
Burin	Henry Butler; Won by acclamation		John Shea†
Fortune Bay		William B. Row; Won by acclamation	William B. Row
Trinity Bay	Thomas Moore; Won by acclamation		Thomas Moore
Twillingate and Fogo	Edward J. Dwyer; Won by acclamation		Thomas Bennett†
