= 1832 Newfoundland general election =

Election in the Colony of Newfoundland

- October 31 – December 8, 1832

15 seats in the Newfoundland House of Assembly 8 seats needed for a majority
	First party	Second party
Party	Conservative	Liberal
Seats won	10	5
Popular vote	3,025	4,373
Percentage	40.89%	59.11%
- Results by riding
Elected party
Conservative

The 1832 Newfoundland general election was held from October 31 to December 8, 1832 to elect the members of the 1st General Assembly of Newfoundland. It was the first democratic election held in the Newfoundland Colony.

Democracy came to Newfoundland after several years of agitation against the British Parliament. The reformers in Newfoundland, led by William Carson and Patrick Morris, received Parliamentary support from George Robinson, and a bill was passed on June 7, 1832 permitting the creation of a bicameral legislature consisting of a Council and a House of Assembly. Newfoundland was the last British colony in North America to gain representative government, previously being governed by appointed colonial officials.

Although the districts were created such that Roman Catholics and Protestants would be equally represented, the majority of those who were elected were Anglican merchants. Despite their vigorous advocacy for representative government, Morris chose not to run and Carson was defeated in his bid for the multi-member district of St. John's. The Anglicans eventually coalesced into the Conservative Party, and the reformers, who primarily consisted of Roman Catholics and dissident Protestants, formed the Liberal Party.

== Structure of the new assembly ==
The eastern half of the colony was divided into nine electoral districts with fifteen members. They were divided in such a manner that Roman Catholics and Protestants would have a roughly equal degree of representation. As it was determined that all residents lived on or near the coast, the electoral boundaries did not give any consideration to areas further inland. The districts were drawn up as follows:

- Conception Bay (4 members): Extending from Topsail to the head of Bay de Verde. There were approximately equal numbers of Roman Catholics and Protestants.
- St. John's (3 members): Extending from Petty Harbour to Topsail and including Bell Island. The district was heavily Roman Catholic.
- Placentia and St. Mary's (2 members): Extending from Cape Race to Rushoon. This district was also predominantly Roman Catholic.
- Bonavista Bay (1 member): Extending from Cape Bonavista to Cape Freels. The majority of residents in this district were Protestant.
- Burin (1 member): Extending from Rushoon to Garnish. This district's population leaned Protestant, but there was a substantial Roman Catholic minority.
- Ferryland (1 member): Extending from Petty Harbour to Cape Race. This district was heavily Roman Catholic.
- Fortune Bay (1 member): Extending from Garnish to Bonne Bay (today known as McCallum). This district was heavily Protestant.
- Trinity Bay (1 member): Extending from the head of Bay de Verde to Cape Bonavista. This district was primarily Protestant.
- Twillingate and Fogo (1 member): Extending from Cape Freels to Cape St. John. This district was heavily Protestant.

The west coast of Newfoundland did not receive any representation as it fell within the jurisdiction of the French Shore established by the 1713 Treaty of Utrecht. Labrador was also not included due to the remoteness of the area and the transient nature of the European settlers there.

The election was conducted using first past the post in single-member districts and block voting in multi-member districts, which ranged in representation from 1 to 4.

=== Suffrage ===
Each candidate for the House of Assembly had to be male, twenty-one years or older, of sound understanding, either natural-born to the island or a lawfully naturalized British citizen, and a resident of two years standing who had occupied a dwelling as either tenant or owner. Also, no candidate could have a criminal record for any infamous or heinous crime. Voters were held to much the same restrictions as candidates except the residency requirement was reduced from two years to one.

== Results by party ==
Party	Candidates	Seats won	% of seats	Popular vote	% of vote
Conservative	13	10	66.67%	3,025	40.89%
Liberal	10	5	33.33%	4,373	59.11%
Totals	23	15	100%	7,398	100%

== Results by district ==
=== St. John's ===
Electoral district	Candidates			Incumbent
Electoral district	Conservative (historical)	Liberal (historical)	Others	Incumbent
St. John's	William Thomas; 762; 24.92%	John Kent; 893; 29.20%	Patrick Mullowney (Independent Liberal); 27; 0.88%	New district
St. John's	Patrick Kough; 647; 21.16%	William Carson; 632; 20.67%	? Walsh (Independent Liberal); 18; 0.59%	New district
St. John's	William B. Row; 39; 1.28%	Patrick Power; 28; 0.92%	? Ryan (Independent Liberal); 12; 0.39%	New district

=== Avalon Peninsula ===
Electoral district	Candidates		Incumbent
Electoral district	Conservative (historical)	Liberal (historical)	Incumbent
Conception Bay	Charles Cozens; 923; 24.11%	Robert Pack; 936; 24.44%	New districts
Conception Bay	Robert Pinsent; 143; 3.73%	Peter Brown; 923; 24.11%	New districts
Conception Bay	Robert Pinsent; 143; 3.73%	James Power; 904; 23.61%	New districts
Ferryland	Robert Carter; Won by acclamation		New districts
Placentia and St. Mary's	John Martin; Won by acclamation	Roger Sweetman; Won by acclamation	New districts

=== Eastern and Southern Newfoundland ===
Electoral district	Candidates		Incumbent
Electoral district	Conservative (historical)	Other	Incumbent
Bonavista Bay	William Brown; 289; 56.56%	Hugh Emerson (Independent Conservative); 222; 43.44%	New districts
Burin	William Hooper; Won by acclamation		New districts
Fortune Bay	Newman Hoyles; Won by acclamation		New districts
Trinity Bay	John Garland; Won by acclamation		New districts
Twillingate and Fogo	Thomas Bennett; Won by acclamation		New districts

== Detailed results ==
The election was conducted over a period of two months from the day of proclamation to the last polling date of December 8, 1832. There were forty-seven polling booths located at strategic locations and not all communities had one. Except for the districts of St. John's, Conception Bay, and Bonavista, the candidates were elected by acclamation.

=== District of Conception Bay ===
The nomination for Conception Bay was held on October 31, 1832, with the following candidates nominated for the four available seats:

- Charles Cozens of Brigus, nominated by William Innott and John McCarthy
- Peter Brown of Harbour Grace, nominated by John C. Nutall and William Molloy
- Robert Pack of Carbonear, nominated by William Dalton and William Talbot
- James Power of Carbonear, nominated by Thomas Chancey and William Bennett
- Robert J. Pinsent of Port de Grave, nominated by Robert Prowse and John Stark

Candidates	October 31	November 1	November 2	November 3	Total
Robert Pack	380	197	228	131	936
Charles Cozens	376	195	223	129	923
Peter Brown	364	202	224	133	923
James Power	371	198	209	126	904
Robert J. Pinsent	31	56	36	20	143

After the election results of November 3, 1832, Robert Pinsent withdrew and the remaining four were declared representatives for the district.

=== District of St. John's ===
Seven candidates offered themselves for election after the reading of the Proclamation and the Writ. Two more offered after the first polling day, which was met with some skepticism. Nominated were:

- Dr. William Carson, nominated by Newman W. Hoyles and Dr. Shea
- John Kent, nominated by Patrick Doyle and T. Beck
- William Thomas, nominated by Mr. Jennings and R. Brine
- William B. Row, nominated by Thomas Bennett and Mr. McBride
- Patrick Kough, nominated by Mr. Barron and Mr. Hogan
- Patrick Mullowney, nominated by R. Howley and M. O'Brien
- Patrick Power, nominated by Mr. Linehan and T. Flannery

Candidates	November 5	November 6	November 7	November 8	November 9	November 10	November 12^{(a)}	Total
John Kent	19	129	137	152	197	190	69	893
William Thomas	17	64	115	141	158	194	73	762
Patrick Kough	4	88	122	124	130	123	56	647
William Carson	15	63	115	119	137	142	41	632
William Row^{(b)}	5	34	nob^{(c)}	nob	nob	nob	nob	39
Patrick Power^{(b)}	0	28	nob	nob	nob	nob	nob	28
Patrick Mullowney^{(b)}	0	27	nob	nob	nob	nob	nob	27
Walsh^{(b)(d)}	nob	18	nob	nob	nob	nob	nob	18
Ryan^{(b)(d)}	nob	12	nob	nob	nob	nob	nob	12

^{(a)} No voting took place on Sunday, November 11.
^{(b)} dropped out of the race after results of November 6.
^{(c)} nob - not on ballot.
^{(d)} not one of the original nominees.

After the results of voting on November 12, 1832, Dr. William Carson withdrew and the remaining three were declared as representatives of the District of St. John's.

At the opening of the House of Assembly on January 2, 1833, Dr. Carson petitioned the House for Patrick Kough's removal, claiming he was a government employee and ineligible. The petition was denied.

=== District of Bonavista ===
There were two candidates for the district of Bonavista, Hugh Alexander Emerson and William Brown. After three polling stations had voted, William Brown withdrew. The returning officer, Peter LeMessurier, refused to recognize his withdrawal from the race and continued to the next polling station at Greenspond, a Brown stronghold. After those results, William Brown was declared the winner, and no voting took place at the remaining polling station at Cape Freels.

At the opening of the House of Assembly on January 2, 1833, Hugh Alexander Emerson petitioned the House for William Brown's removal due to Peter LeMessurier's actions. The petition was denied.

== Aftermath ==
John Bingley Garland was appointed the first Speaker of the House. Both John Bingley Garland and William Thomas were appointed to the Executive Council and resigned their seats in the House of Assembly. William Row, who ran for a seat in St. John’s, was given the seat for Trinity Bay and Dr. William Carson was given a seat for the District of St. John's.

== See also ==
- General elections in Newfoundland (pre-Confederation)
