= John McCarthy (Newfoundland politician) =

Newfoundland politician

Member of the House of Assembly for Conception Bay
- In office 1837–1842 Serving with James Power, Peter Brown, and Anthony Godfrey
- Preceded by: Robert Pack; Charles Cozens; James Power; Peter Brown
- Succeeded by: Thomas Ridley; John Munn; James Luke Prendergast; Edmund Hanrahan

Personal details
- Party: Liberal

John McCarthy was a Newfoundland politician from 1837 until 1842, representing the district of Conception Bay. He was elected in 1837 and served until he was defeated in 1842. He was a Member of the Liberal Party.
