= General elections in pre-Confederation Newfoundland =

Elections in Canada

Newfoundland, as a British colony and dominion, held 29 general elections for its 28 Newfoundland House of Assemblies; the results of the second election in 1836 were set aside, and another election held in 1837.

In 1934, the Dominion of Newfoundland surrendered its constitution to the Crown and ceased to have a legislature in order to be ruled by London through the Commission of Government. The next House of Assembly was not elected until 27 May 1949 after Newfoundland had become the tenth province of Canada on 31 March 1949, following the 1948 referendum on joining Canadian Confederation.

As much information as is currently available about the dates of election, number of members returned, and the result by party, is set out below. Newfoundland's party system was subject to frequent changes due to the polarized and often violent elections, so an attempt has been made to explain the relationships between the parties and some brief highlights of political events.

== History ==
Prior to the province been granted colony status in 1832, Newfoundland had no elected form of government. In the early days after discovery, the island was divided into colonies and were administered by individuals authorized to govern proprietary colonies and are likewise called Proprietary governors. The first of these were established in 1610 at Cuper's Cove and was governed by John Guy. Other colonies were soon established and were likewise governed by individuals with keen interest to reap the benefits to its mercantile owners in England. This type of rule had continued until 1728. From 1729 to 1817 Newfoundland was governed by non-resident naval governors. Sir Francis Pickmore became the first resident governor. It was then established that all other governors were required to remain on the island over winter.

In 1824, when Newfoundland was granted Colonial status the then governor Sir Thomas Cochrane appointed an advisory council without any real power. With the arrival of Dr. William Carson to Newfoundland, who was very familiar with British constitutional law, a concerted effort was made to influence the residents to form Representative Government. Others of prominence such as Patrick Morris, William Thomas, Thomas H. Brooking, Benjamin Bowring, Charles Tricks Bowring and Henry Winton had also joined in to agitate for elected representation with power to govern. Brooking was chosen as chairman of the committee to make representation to the British Parliament in January 1832.

On 7 June 1832, a Bill to grant a Representative Assembly to Newfoundland was introduced in the British Parliament. Governor Cochrane returned to Newfoundland in August with the power to call an election and did so on 25 September 1832. However, full responsible government would not be granted until 1855.

== 1st general election: 1832 ==
Party composition: Conservative 10, Liberal 5. Total Assembly membership 15.

After many years of agitation, the British Parliament provided Newfoundland with a local legislature. Unfortunately, the ethnic and religious disagreements in the colony, between the predominantly Irish Catholic and British Protestant inhabitants, caused the system to work even less well than in other parts of British North America.

== 2nd general election: November 1836 ==
Party composition: Liberal 11, Conservative 4.

The elected leaders were dominated by reformers, who were mostly Catholic. The appointed Legislative Council was mostly composed of conservative Protestant merchants. However, the two Houses did not meet, when Chief Justice Henry John Boulton discovered some of the writs from the election were not sealed, and called another election.

== 3rd general election: May 1837 ==
Party composition: Liberal 11, Conservative 4. Total Assembly membership 15.

A new election was called by Chief Justice Henry John Boulton after he discovered some of the writs from the previous election were not sealed. This was disputed by many Reformers and many did not run for election. However, in this election the Reformers took most of the seats.

== 4th general election: December 1842 ==
Party composition unknown. Total membership of the Consolidated Legislature 15 elected and 10 appointed members.

The experiment was tried of combining the Assembly and Council in a unicameral legislature. The British Parliament twice extended the term of this legislature. By 1847 the whole system broke down. A bicameral legislature was restored, which continued until 1932.

== 5th general election: November 1848 ==
Party composition unknown but divided between a Liberal majority and a Conservative minority. Total Assembly membership 15.

Support grew for the introduction of a government responsible to the Assembly, which was being introduced elsewhere in British North America about this time.

== 6th general election: November 1852 ==
Party composition: Liberal 9, Conservative 6. Total Assembly membership 15.

The campaign for responsible government continued and was accepted by the Colonial Office in London.

== 7th general election: 7 May 1855 ==
With this election, Newfoundland becomes the last British colony in North America to achieve responsible government.

Party composition unknown but divided between a Liberal majority and a Conservative minority. Total Assembly membership 30.

The Liberal leader, Philip Francis Little, became the first Premier of the Colony. The Liberals were a largely Catholic party, which depended on Methodist support to defeat the mostly Anglican Conservative opposition.

Little became a Judge in 1858 and the Premiership passed to an older Catholic Liberal, John Kent.

== 8th general election: 7 November 1859 ==
Party composition: Liberal 18, Conservative 12. Total Assembly membership 30.

Kent's government got in severe difficulties. The Methodists had begun to switch their support to the Conservatives endangering the Liberal majority.

Kent, a man with a fiery temper, was on bad terms with the Governor. In 1861 after the Premier accused the Judges of conspiring against his Government, the Governor was delighted to dismiss him.

The Conservative leader, Hugh Hoyles, was installed as Premier. As he was in a minority in the Assembly the new Premier requested and got a dissolution.

== 9th general election: 2 May 1861 ==
Party composition: Conservative 15, Liberal 13, vacant 2. Total Assembly membership 30.

This was the most violent and sectarian election in Newfoundland's history. In one two member electoral district a party of voters going to the polling place were attacked. A relative of one of the candidates was shot dead. Subsequently, there were riots. The returning office later gave sworn evidence that he had only returned two members due to his being threatened. A mob attacked and burnt the returning officers home, a few days later.

The Assembly decided not to seat any claimants from the disputed election, although the Conservatives won the subsequent by-election.

Shortly before the next election Hugh Hoyles was replaced as Premier by a more conciliatory Conservative, Frederick Carter, who was anxious to reduce sectarian strife and bring some Catholics into the cabinet.

== 10th general election: 7 May 1865 ==
Party composition: Conservatives 22, Opposition 8. Total Assembly membership 30.

Carter did acquire some Catholic support as the old sectarian alignments broke down. The issue of whether Newfoundland should become a part of Canada caused a realignment. A new Anti-Confederation Party opposed the mostly pro-Confederation Conservatives. The next general election would decide the issue.

== 11th general election: 13 November 1869 ==
Party composition: Anti-Confederation 21, Conservative 9. Total Assembly membership 30.

The defeat for the Confederation cause was so complete that the Conservatives soon dropped the idea. For many years afterward being called a supporter of Confederation was a political smear.

The new Premier was Charles Fox Bennett, a Protestant leader of a mostly Catholic party. All was well so long as the Confederation issue was still dominant, but there was always a risk of sectarian strife reappearing.

== 12th general election: November 1873 ==
Party composition: Anti-Confederation 17, Conservative 13. Total Assembly membership 30.

The Anti-Confederates led by Charles Fox Bennett won the election and formed the government; a "new" Conservative party led by Frederick Carter formed the opposition.

== 13th general election: 7 November 1874 ==
Party composition: Conservative 17, Anti-Confederation 13. Total Assembly membership 30.

The Conservatives decided that the way to win the next election was to take up sectarian issues. The tactic worked at some cost to the islands political stability. Frederick Carter defeats Fox and regains the Premiership. The party system continued to move in the direction of renewed sectarianism. The Anti-Confederation Party faded away and was replaced by a new Liberal Party, as before largely composed of Catholics.

In April 1878 Carter was replaced as Conservative Premier by William Whiteway.

== 14th general election: 4 November 1878 ==
Party composition: Conservative 21, Liberal 10. Total Assembly membership 31.

Whiteway continued in office as Premier.

== 15th general election: 6 November 1882 ==
Party composition unknown but divided between a Conservative majority and a Liberal minority. Total Assembly membership 32.

Premier Whiteway's support began to splinter. A New Party, based on merchant interests in the capital, broke away.

== 16th general election: 31 October 1885 ==
Party composition: Reform 18, Liberal 13, Independent 1. Total Assembly membership: 32

The election was contested by a Reform Party which replaced Whiteway's Conservatives. Sir Robert Thorburn of the Reform Party took over as Premier. The Reform Party campaigned on a policy of not compromising with Catholics. Thorburn broke his election promise by inviting Catholic Liberals to join his government. The Reform and Liberal parties merged, to form a larger Reform Party. Meanwhile, William Whiteway, the former Conservative leader, set up a new party. As the name Liberal was not being used, Whiteway adopted it for his new party. It must therefore be appreciated that the Liberal Party which contested the 15th general election was a different party from the Liberal Party from the 16th general election onwards.

== 17th general election: 6 November 1889 ==
Party composition: Liberals 28, Reform 3, Independent 1. Total Assembly membership: 32

William Whiteway began a new Premiership, but he was not as vigorous as he had been in his previous term of office.

The Reform Party disappeared and a new Tory Party took over as the opposition to the Liberals.

== 18th general election: 6 November 1893 ==
Party composition: Liberal 23, Tory 12, Independent 1. Total Assembly membership 36.

Many of the victorious Liberals (and the Independent) had their elections set aside by the Courts. The Premier and his leading supporters were unseated and disqualified from seeking re-election.

The Governor appointed the Tory leader, Augustus F. Goodridge, as Premier in 1894. However, as the Liberals kept on winning by-elections Goodridge never had a majority.

In December 1894 the interim Liberal leader, Daniel J. Greene, became Premier. In February 1895 he passed a law to lift the electoral disqualification of Whiteway and then resigned in his favour.

== 19th general election: 28 October 1897 ==
Party composition: Tory 23, Liberal 13. Total Assembly membership 36.

The new Premier was Sir James Spearman Winter. By 1900 the Tory Party had faded out in the way Newfoundland parties quite often seemed to do.

== 20th general election: 8 November 1900 ==
Party composition: Liberal 32, Opposition 4. Total Assembly membership 36.

Sir Robert Bond of the Liberal Party became Premier. Bond is accounted the best of Newfoundland's Premiers and the early 20th century was one of the rare periods of prosperity in island history.

== 21st general election: 31 October 1904 ==
Party composition: Liberal 30, United Opposition 6. Total Assembly membership 36.

The so-called United Opposition Party was reinforced when Edward Patrick Morris resigned from Bond's government. Morris founded the Newfoundland People's Party, which became the principal opponent of the Liberals.

Newfoundland was recognized as a Dominion of the British Empire (the same status as that of Canada, Australia and New Zealand) in 1907.

== 22nd general election: 2 November 1908 ==
Party composition: Liberal 18, People's 18. Total Assembly membership 36.

The tied result caused problems. Sir Robert Bond did not feel he could continue with this Assembly, as once his party provided a Speaker they would be in a voting minority. The Governor refused an immediate dissolution, so Bond resigned. Sir Edward Patrick Morris formed a government, but had the same problem as Bond. The Governor granted Morris a dissolution.

== 23rd general election: 8 May 1909 ==
Party composition: People's 26, Liberal 10. Total Assembly membership 36.

The title of prime minister replaced premier in 1909.

== 24th general election: 30 October 1913 ==
Party composition: People's 21, Union 8, Liberal 7. Total Assembly membership 36.

William Coaker of the Fishermen's Protective Union decided to set up a political party. The Union (or Unionist) Party entered into an electoral pact with the Liberals.

During the First World War, Newfoundland made considerable sacrifices. Newfoundland had no military forces before the War. The islanders built up the Royal Newfoundland Regiment. Appalling casualties on the Western Front made conscription a live issue. The People's Party invited opposition leaders to join a National government.

When Sir Edward Patrick Morris resigned in 1918, the Liberal leader William Lloyd was invited to lead the coalition government.

Before the 1919 election the Liberal and Union parties linked themselves in the Liberal Reform Party. In May 1919 the People's Party leader, Sir Michael Cashin, moved a motion of no confidence in a ministry he seems to have quit minutes before. The motion passed so Cashin became prime minister.

== 25th general election: 2 November 1919 ==
Party composition: Liberal Reform 24, People's 12. Total Assembly membership 36.

The new Liberal Reform Prime Minister was Sir Richard Squires. The People's Party became the Liberal-Labour-Progressive Party following the election.

== 26th general election: 2 May 1923 ==
Party composition: Liberal Reform 23, Liberal-Labour-Progressive 13. Total Assembly membership 36.

In this Assembly term leading Minister's were attacked for corruption by a resigning colleague. Squires' reputation seemed to have been destroyed. William Warren became a Liberal Reform Prime Minister in July 1923. Albert Hickman took over immediately before the 1924 election.

Before the next election the Liberal-Reform Party collapsed. Some of its members joined with Albert Hickman as the Liberal-Progressive Party. William Warren was associated with Tories in forming a replacement for the Liberal-Labour-Progressive Party which was named the Liberal-Conservative-Progressive Party.

== 27th general election: 2 June 1924 ==
Party composition: Liberal-Conservative-Progressive 25, Liberal-Progressive 10, Other 1. Total Assembly membership 36.

The new prime minister was Walter Stanley Monroe, a businessman who promoted legislation, which some Newfoundlanders considered unduly benefited the rich. In August 1928 the Prime Ministership was passed to Monroe's cousin Frederick C. Alderdice.

The plain businessman's government had become so unpopular that the population was prepared to re-elect Sir Richard Squires, leading the Liberal Party with the support of its Union Party allies.

== 28th general election: 29 October 1928 ==
Party composition: Liberal 19, Liberal-Conservative-Progressive 12, Union 9. Total Assembly membership 40.

Sir Richard Squires became prime minister for the second time with the support of the Union Party. Frederick C. Alderdice re-organized the opposition as the United Newfoundland Party.

The Great Depression hit Newfoundland hard. The island had not had a budget surplus since 1919 and had been borrowing to cover budget deficits. Cuts in public expenditure and rising unemployment produced political unrest.

In 1932 a demonstration outside the Colonial Building (where the legislature sat) led to a riot. The demonstrators broke into the building. They were prevented from invading the floor of the Assembly, but Squires fled out of a side door and went into hiding for a few days. He lost the general election which followed.

== 29th general election: 11 June 1932 ==
Party composition: United Newfoundland 24, Liberal 2, Other 1. Total Assembly membership 27 (reduced from 40 as an economy measure).

New Prime Minister Frederick C. Alderdice was not able to rescue the public finances. By this time Newfoundlanders despaired of the ability of their politicians to solve the problems. The British government commissioned William Warrender Mackenzie, 1st Baron Amulree to conduct a study of the situation in Newfoundland. His Amulree Report was scathing about the political culture of Newfoundland.

The price of British government financial aid was the abandonment of responsible and representative government. The legislature was dissolved. The Commission of Government came into operation on 16 February 1934 ending more than a century of legislative democracy in Newfoundland.

== See also ==
- Conservative parties in Newfoundland (pre-Confederation)
- Liberal parties in Newfoundland (pre-Confederation)
- Fishermen's Protective Union
- Newfoundland People's Party
- United Newfoundland Party
- Category:Elections in Canada
- Category:Politics of Newfoundland and Labrador
- Category:Political parties in the Dominion of Newfoundland
