= James Luke Prendergast =

Newfoundland politician

James Luke Prendergast JP MHA

Member of the House of Assembly for Conception Bay
- In office 1842–1852 Serving with Thomas Ridley (1842–1848); John Munn (1842–1848); Edmund Hanrahan (1842–1852); Nicholas Molloy (1848–1852); Richard Rankin (1848–1852)
- Preceded by: John McCarthy; Peter Brown; Anthony Godfrey; James Power
- Succeeded by: John Hayward; John Bemister; William Talbot; Edmund Hanrahan

Member of the House of Assembly for Harbour Grace
- In office 1855–1859 Serving with John Hayward
- Preceded by: New seat
- Succeeded by: Himself
- In office 1860–1861
- Preceded by: Himself
- Succeeded by: John Hayward; Henry J. Moore

Personal details
- Born: April 7, 1800 Harbour Grace, Newfoundland
- Died: May 13, 1895 (aged 95) Harbour Grace, Newfoundland
- Party: Liberal (1842–1852; 1855–1869); Independent Liberal (1852–c.1855); Anti-Confederation Party (1869)

James Luke Prendergast (April 7, 1800 – May 13, 1895) was a merchant and political figure in Newfoundland. He represented Conception Bay from 1842 to 1852 and Harbour Grace from 1855 to 1859 and from 1860 to 1861 in the Newfoundland and Labrador House of Assembly as a Liberal.

He was born in Harbour Grace, the son of James Prendergast, and established himself in business there. Prendergast married Margaret Bransfield in 1825. In an 1840 by-election, he ran for a seat in the Newfoundland assembly as an independent Liberal against Edmund Hanrahan. Following widespread violence during the campaign, the governor Henry Prescott set aside the results of the election. Prendergast was first elected when he ran as a Liberal in 1842. He was defeated when he ran again as an independent Liberal in 1852. He served as acting superintendent of fisheries after he was elected again in 1855 as a Liberal. His election in 1859 was overturned but Prendergast was elected in the 1860 by-election that followed. The polls were not opened in Harbour Grace for the general election in 1861 because of the threat of violence and Prendergast was defeated in the by-election held later that year. He ran unsuccessfully for a seat in the assembly in 1869 as an anti-Confederate. Prendergast later served as sheriff of Harbour Grace and as a justice of the peace. He died in Harbour Grace at the age of 95.
