= Robert John Pinsent =

Canadian politician (1797–1876)

Robert John Pinsent (1797 in Newfoundland Colony – 1876) magistrate and politician ran in the first general election held in Newfoundland in 1832 to represent the district of Conception Bay. He had lost to Charles Cozens, Peter Brown and Robert Pack in an election that took 4 days to complete the balloting.

Pinsent, son of William Pinsent was born in the Conception Bay area into a wealthy merchant class. He was appointed magistrate in Brigus in 1836 then magistrate of Harbour Grace shortly after. He was appointed Justice of the Peace in 1851. Pinsent served as judge of the Labrador court from 1863 to 1874. He was made a member of the Executive Council in 1862.

In 1874, he retired, and died in 1876, aged 78 or 79, in London.

== See also ==
- List of people of Newfoundland and Labrador
- List of communities in Newfoundland and Labrador
