= Edward Kielley =

Edward Kielley or Kielly (ca. 1790 – March 8, 1855) was a naval officer and surgeon in Newfoundland. He is remembered primarily for his role in a case Kielley v. Carson which established a limit on the powers granted to assemblies in British colonies.

He was born in St. John's and became an assistant surgeon in the Royal Navy in 1814; he was promoted to surgeon the following year. In 1818, he set up practice in St. John's. Kielley married Amelia Jackson in 1822. In 1824, he was acquitted of the charge of assault with intent to commit rape on a woman from Twillingate. Kielly became surgeon for the St. John's jail in 1826. He subsequently returned to service in the Navy but was discharged, having been declared an invalid, and returned to St. John's, where he returned to service as jail surgeon. In 1832, he became a member of the board of health and medical officer for St. John's. Kielley was named district surgeon in 1834. Although a Roman Catholic, he was seen as aligned against the pro-Catholic reformers.

== Kielley v. Carson ==
In August 1838, Kielley quarrelled with John Kent and threatened him with injury. Kent brought the issue before the assembly, claiming that his parliamentary privilege had been violated. The assembly interviewed witnesses, a warrant was issued by the speaker William Carson and he was arrested by the assembly's sergeant-at-arms. Kielley was brought before the assembly; refusing to apologize, he called Kent "a liar and a coward". He was sent to jail but was released by the sheriff on a writ of habeas corpus issued by George Lilly, an assistant justice of the Supreme Court. The assembly ordered the arrest of Lilly and the sheriff. At this point, governor Sir Henry Prescott prorogued the assembly. The Supreme Court of Newfoundland found in favour of the assembly in December 1838 but this decision was overturned by the judicial committee of the British Privy Council in January 1843, who found that colonial parliaments did not necessarily have all the privileges associated with the British House of Commons. In 1844, the assembly found that Kielley should be compensated out of public funds for his legal expenses in the matter.

Kielley died in St. John's in 1855.
