= 1832 election =

1832 election may refer to:

- 1832 Newfoundland general election
- 1832 United Kingdom general election
- 1832 United States presidential election
