= Thomas Ridley =

Newfoundland merchant and politician (1799–1879)

The Honourable Thomas Ridley MHA

Member of the Newfoundland House of Assembly for Conception Bay
- In office December 20, 1842 – November 20, 1848 Serving with Edmund Hanrahan, John Munn, and James Prendergast
- Preceded by: Peter Brown; Anthony Godfrey; John McCarthy; James Power
- Succeeded by: Nicholas Molloy; Richard Rankin

Personal details
- Born: 1799 England or Ireland
- Died: March 20, 1879 (aged 79–80) Upper Tooting, Surrey, England
- Party: Conservative
- Spouse: Margaret Harrison
- Children: Thomas H. Ridley
- Occupation: Merchant

Thomas Ridley (1799 – March 20, 1879) was a merchant and political figure in Newfoundland. He represented Conception Bay in the Newfoundland and Labrador House of Assembly from 1842 to 1848.

He was born in England or Ireland and came to Newfoundland around 1820 to work for his uncle William Bennett, later becoming his partner in the firm Bennett and Ridley. With a partner, he established Thomas Ridley and Company, a fishing supply business, in Harbour Grace; the firm was later renamed Ridley and Sons. He was a member of the Executive Council from 1843 to 1848. The business was declared insolvent in 1873. Ridley returned to England and died in Upper Tooting, Surrey in 1879.
