= Admiralty House, Bermuda =

Coordinates: 32°18′23″N 64°48′23″W

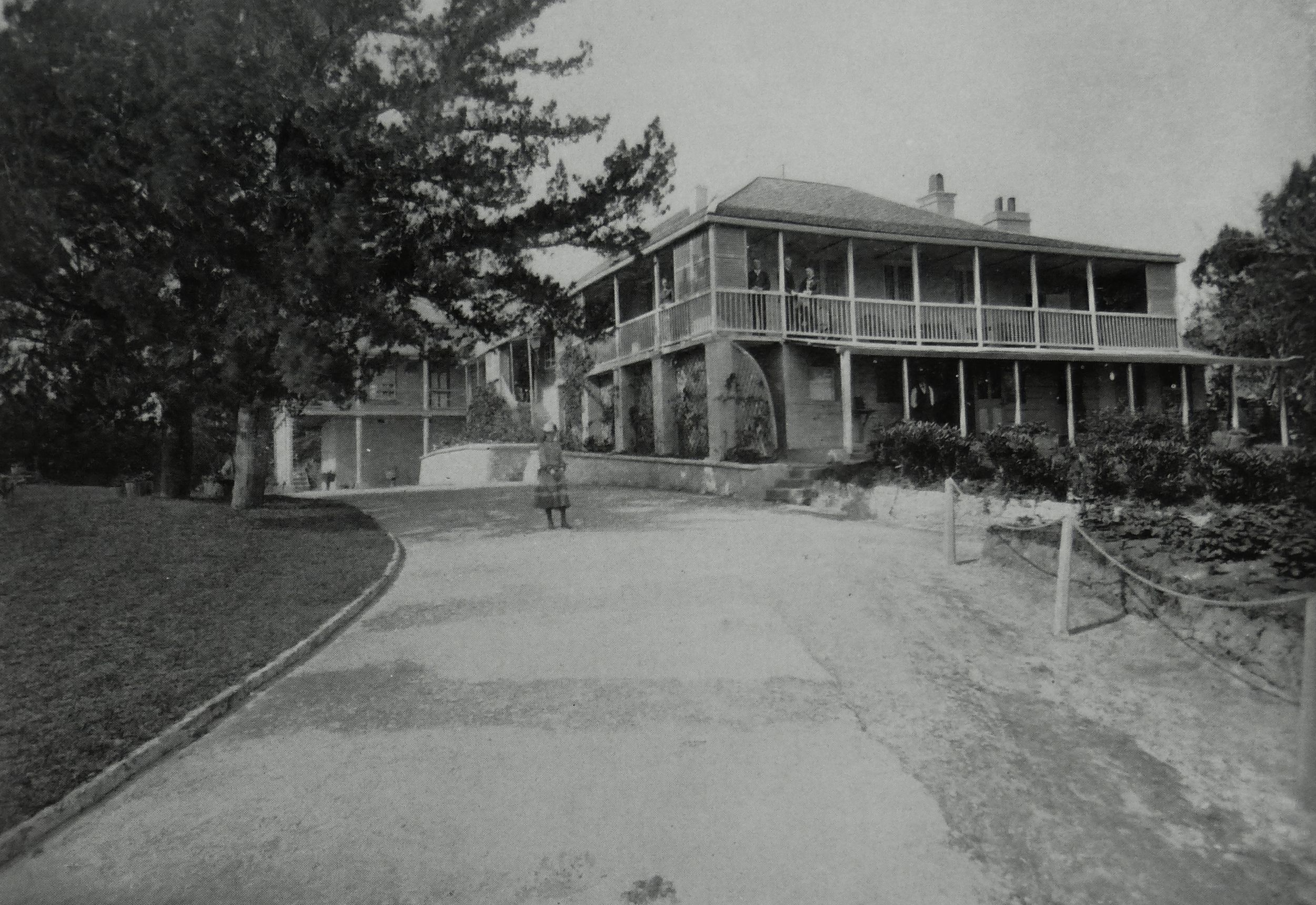
- Admiralty House at Clarence Hill, formerly St. John's Hill
- Active: 1795–1956
- Country: United Kingdom
- Branch: Royal Navy
- Role: Residence
- Garrison/HQ: North America and West Indies Station

Admiralty House, Bermuda, was the official residence and offices for the senior officer of the Royal Navy in Bermuda, originally the Commander-in-Chief of the North America and West Indies Station.

== Early Admiralty Houses in Bermuda ==
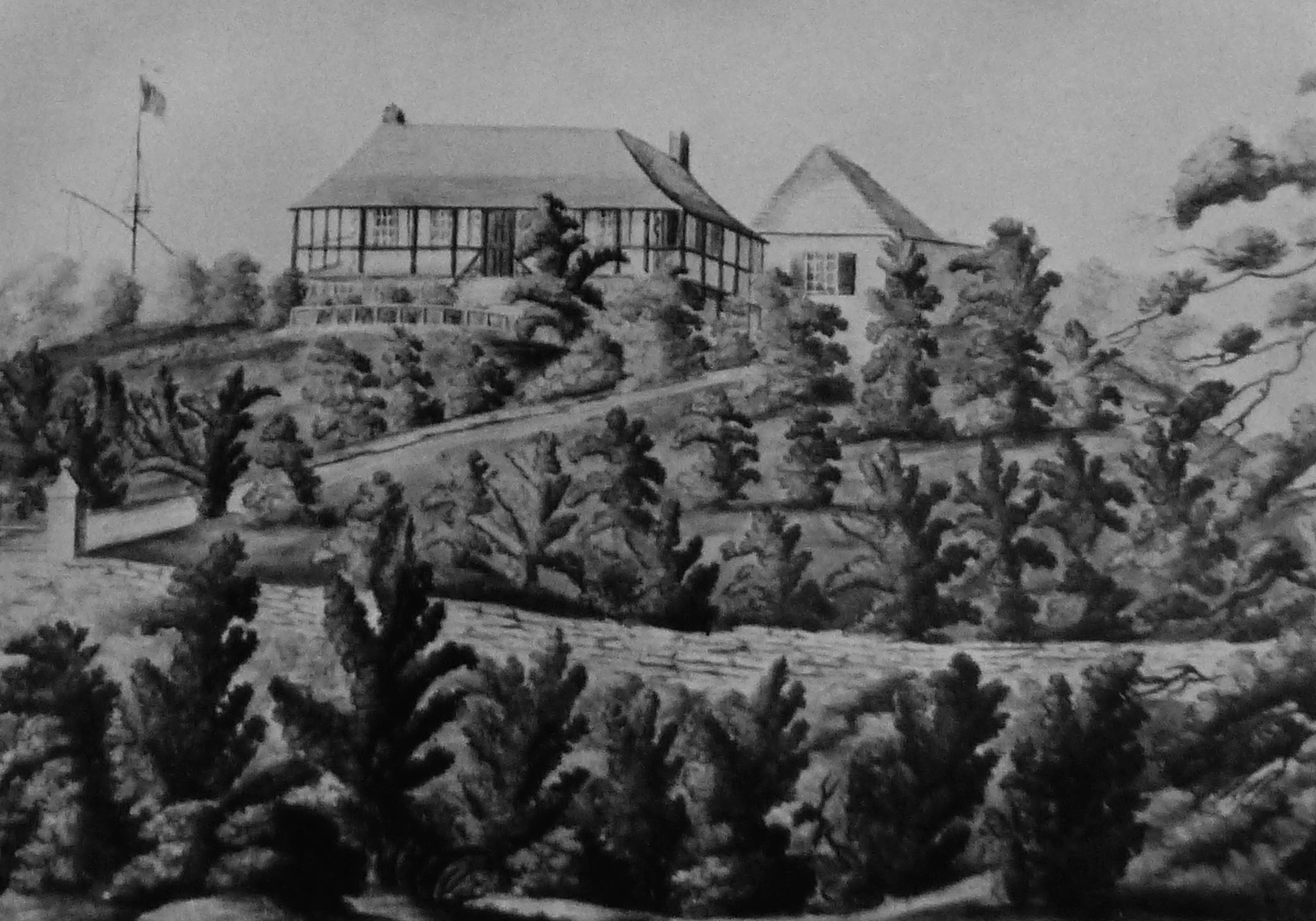
Admiralty House Bermuda at Mount Wyndham (1810 to 1816)

The first location of Admiralty House was at Rose Hill, in St. George's Town, between 1795 and 1806. This was where Irish poet Thomas Moore was employed as a clerk to the Admiralty Court in 1803. St. George's Harbour had been the only harbour suitable for large naval vessels that also had a known access route through Bermuda's encircling barrier reef. The Royal Navy had begun establishing itself in and around the town, especially at Convict Bay, but had longer-term plans for a dockyard and naval base at the opposite end of the archipelago. Royal Naval hydrographers had spent a dozen years in charting the reef, and had discovered a channel that enabled mooring vessels off the northern shore of St. George's Island at a location that became known as Murray's Anchorage, after Vice-Admiral Sir George Murray, who led the first fleet to anchor there in 1794. This also opened up the West End of Bermuda, where the Royal Navy had already begun purchasing land around the Great Sound and Hamilton Harbour, to access by large vessels.

St. John's Hill, a property at Spanish Point, in Pembroke Parish that belonged to John Dunscombe (a Bermudian who later became a prominent resident and Lieutenant-Governor of Newfoundland), was rented by the Admiralty in 1810 as a residence for the Royal Naval Commander-in-Chief, by then Admiral Sir John Warren. It was then intended to move Admiralty House to a building on Langton Hill, also in Pembroke, but this evidently did not happen. In 1810, Admiralty House moved instead to the rented Mount Wyndham, above Bailey's Bay. This location allowed observation of both St. George's Harbour and Murray's Anchorage, and signals could be passed between these points with visual aids (flags or lights). Mount Wyndham was "granted by" the House of Assembly in 1812, and St. John's Hill (which was still being rented by the Admiralty, but had been sitting vacant) was adapted to a naval hospital during a yellow fever epidemic that year.

== Move to the West End ==
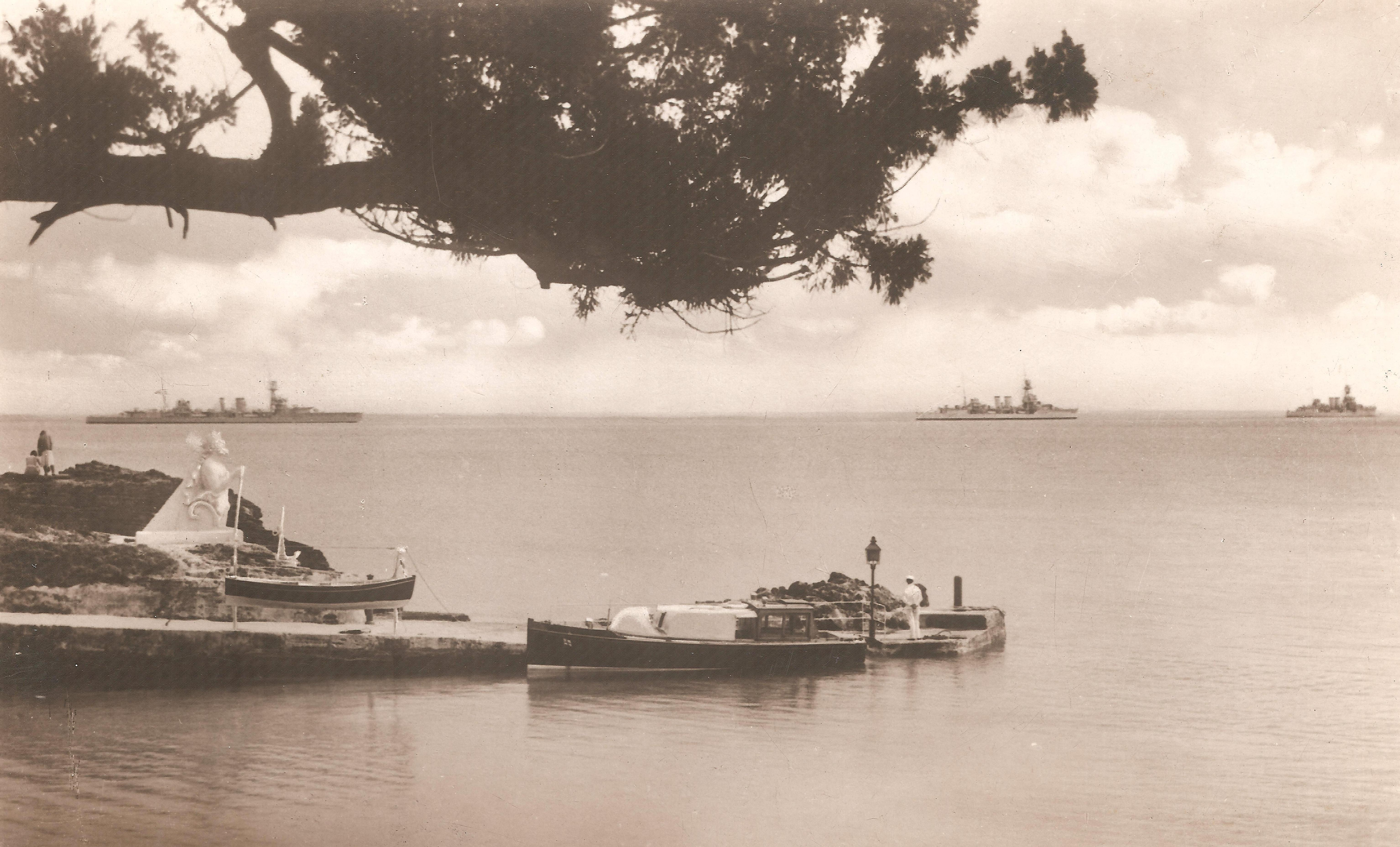
America and West Indies Station 1st Division (HMS Dragon, HMS Danae and HMS Despatch) off Admiralty House in 1931 as they depart their base at the Royal Naval Dockyard in the Imperial fortress colony of Bermuda to exercise on the open ocean

With the development of the Royal Naval Dockyard underway at Ireland Island, Bermuda, Mount Wyndham was unable to provide visibility of the base or the Great Sound, where a new anchorage would be located at Grassy Bay. Consequently, Spanish Point was rented by the Admiralty for a peppercorn beginning in 1813. However, the blockade of the Atlantic Seaboard harbours of the United States during the American War of 1812 was orchestrated from Mount Wyndham, as was the punitive raid on the Chesapeake Bay in 1814 that included the Burning of Washington. In 1816 St. John's Hill was purchased by the Government of Bermuda for £2,000-3,000 pounds and gifted to the Admiralty by the House of Assembly. "Admiralty House" moved there from Mount Wyndham in the same year.

== Closure ==
In 1822, St. John's Hill was renamed "Clarence Hill", commemorating Admiral of the Fleet, Prince William, the Duke of Clarence (later King William IV), and remained Admiralty House until 1956, when it finally closed. During the interim, the Commander-in-Chief based there saw his station expand from the North America Station to the North America and West Indies Station with the absorption of the Newfoundland Station and the Jamaica Station, and to the America and West Indies Station in 1926, when it absorbed the geographic areas of the former South East Coast of America Station and the Pacific Station. Alliance with the United States of America in the Second World War, and subsequently in the North Atlantic Treaty Organization would see the United States Navy taking preeminence in the western North Atlantic with Bermuda's dockyard reduced to a base (without facilities to repair or refit ships) in 1951, and the role of the Commander-in-Chief on the station being abolished in 1956, leaving no requirement for an Admiralty House.

== Civil use ==
The Bermuda Government then used Admiralty House as a barracks for the Bermuda Police Service (the first constables housed there were originally caretakers). After the Bermuda Militia Artillery and the Bermuda Rifles amalgamated in 1965 to form the Bermuda Regiment (now the Royal Bermuda Regiment), it housed one of the regiment's rifle companies until the early-1970s, when all sub-units of the regiment were collected at Warwick Camp. In 1973, the property was adapted for the rehabilitation of drug addicts by The Group, a charity with wide backing. Although the grounds are still generally referred to as Admiralty House, the Admiralty House itself was deemed unsafe, and uneconomical to repair, and was deliberately burnt down on 24 January 1974. Later that year, the Government of Bermuda's Department of Education began planning to redevelop the Admiralty House grounds as a unified campus for the Bermuda College. This was to include the college Department of Hotel Technology's hotel training school, a working hotel where students could gain practical experience. Although the foreshore and the eastern slope of Clarence Hill were to be designated a botanical and biological preserve, the campus plan was protested by the Admiralty House Park Association, which included local residents, and by the organisations already based on the property. The protests were ultimately successful as the hotel training school, originally titled Stonington Beach, was instead placed on the South Shore in Paget (the main campus of the college was situated separately at the former Prospect Camp, until moving to the same site in Paget in the 1990s).

== Current use ==
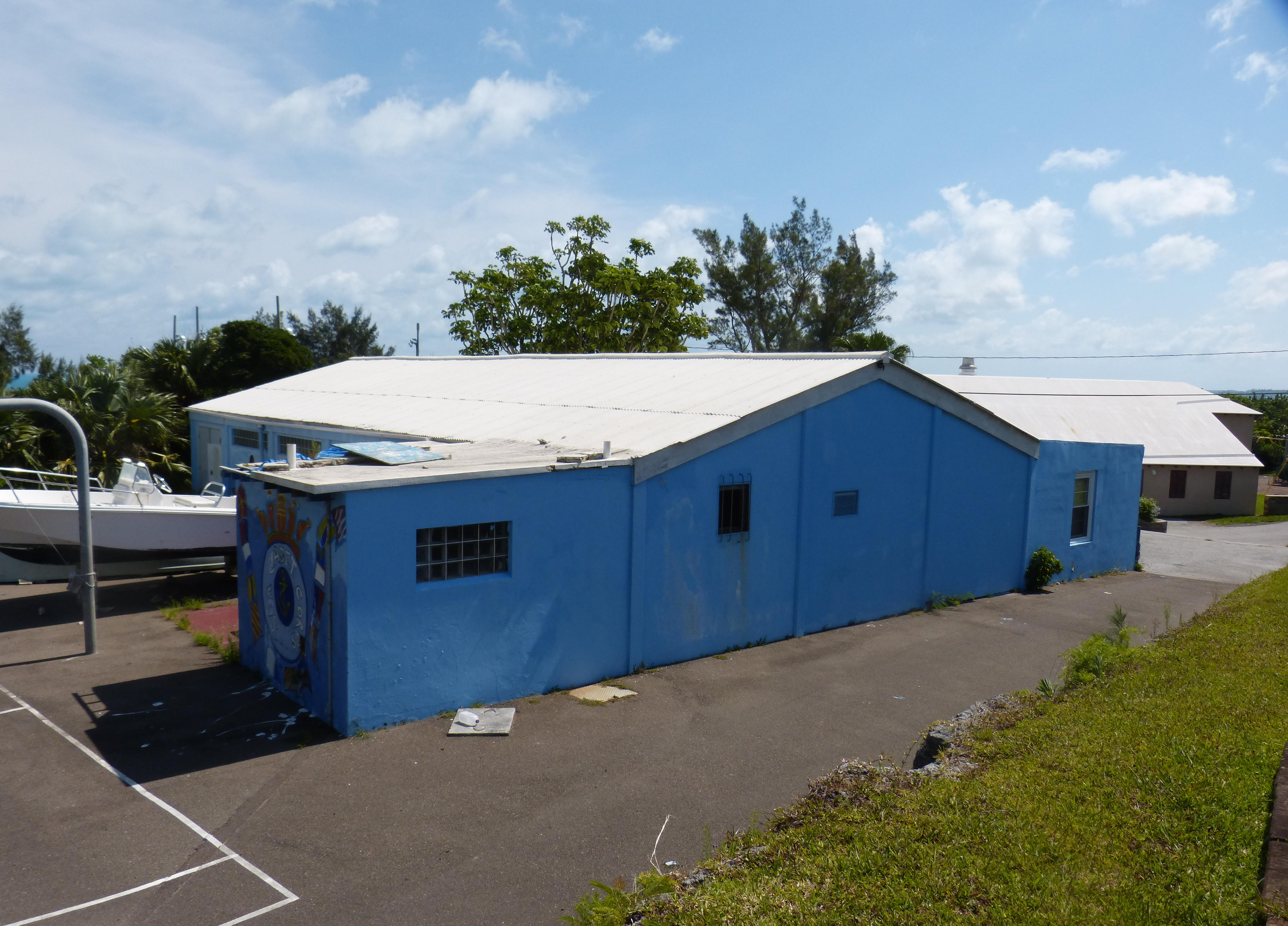
TS Bermuda (Sea Cadet Corps) at Admiralty House in 2016

While most of the grounds are now public parkland, the Clarence Hill property retains a naval use as part of it has since 1968 housed TS Bermuda, the headquarters unit of the Bermuda Sea Cadet Corps.

Mount Wyndham (where the press of the Great Seal of the Confederacy, which had been waiting in Bermuda for delivery to Charleston, South Carolina by blockade-runner, was kept for many decades after the defeat of the Confederate States of America ended the American Civil War) returned to use as a private dwelling after Admiralty House was relocated to St. John's Hill, and currently is part of a housing condominium development which includes many newer buildings.

Rose Hill became the site of the St. George's Hotel, and currently is occupied by the St. George's Club, a time sharing development made up of seventy-one cottages, an administration building (also containing a restaurant), and storage buildings. No earlier structures remain.
