= John Dunscombe =

Newfoundland politician

John Dunscomb (c. 1777 – November 1847) was a merchant and political figure in Newfoundland. He was a member of the Executive Council for Newfoundland from 1833 to 1842.

Dunscomb, son of Christiana (Godfrey) and Edward Dunscomb, was born in Bermuda and came to Newfoundland in 1808 as an agent for a group of Bermuda businessman. He married Elizabeth Magill, daughter of Sarah Devey (Denny)and Capt. Charles Magill in 1799 in Cheshire, Connecticut. He sold St. John's Hill, his property in Spanish Point, Bermuda, to the Government of Bermuda in 1816. (The Government later gave the property to its existing tenant, the Royal Navy, to become the new Admiralty House for the North America and West Indies Station.) Dunscomb was named an aide-de-camp for Governor Thomas John Cochrane in 1825. In 1845, he moved to Montreal, Quebec. Dunscomb died in Liverpool, England. He and Elizabeth are buried in the churchyard of St. Mary’s Edge Hill, Liverpool.

His daughter Caroline Augusta married James Crowdy, a member of the assembly. His daughter Sarah Christiana married Church of England clergyman Thomas Finch Hobday Bridge. His son, John Josiah William Dunscomb, married Caroline Birche Durnford, daughter of Major General Elias Walker Durnford and Jane Sophia Mann, and became Collector of Customs for the Port of Quebec.
