= Richard Walter (chaplain) =

British Royal Navy chaplain

- Born: 1716?
- Died: 10 March 1785
- Occupation: Royal Navy chaplain

Richard Walter (1716? – 10 March 1785) was a British Royal Navy chaplain.

== Biography ==
Walter was the son of Arthur Walter, merchant in London. He was admitted a member of Sidney-Sussex College, Cambridge, on 3 July 1735, 'aged 18.' He graduated B.A. in 1738, was elected to a fellowship, ordained, and in 1740 was appointed chaplain of his majesty's ship Centurion, then fitting out for her celebrated voyage round the world, under the command of Commodore George Anson. As the Centurion sailed in September 1740, Walter cannot have been ordained priest later than Trinity Sunday 1740, which throws the date of his birth back to May 1716 at the latest. His age at matriculation must have been erroneously entered by at least a year.

Walter continued in the Centurion, having often with the other officers, though 'a puny, weakly man, pale, and of a low stature,' to assist in the actual working of the ship, till her arrival at Macao in November 1742. In December, an opportunity occurring, he obtained the commodore's leave, and returned to England in one of the East India Company's ships. He took his M.A. degree in 1744, and in March 1745 was appointed chaplain of Portsmouth dockyard, a post which he held till his death on 10 March 1785. He was buried at Great Staughton, Huntingdon, where he owned some property, though it does not appear that he had ever resided there.

On 5 May 1748 he married, in Gray's Inn Chapel, Jane Saberthwaite of St. Margaret's, Lothbury, and left issue a son and daughter, whose descendants survive. The son's great-grandson, the Rev. E. L. H. Tew, owned a portrait of his ancestor. The daughter's son was Sir Henry Prescott. In 1748 Walter published 'A Voyage round the World in the years 1740-1-2-3-4, by George Anson, esq., now Lord Anson . . . compiled from his papers and materials by Richard Walter, Chaplain of His Majesty s ship the Centurion in that Expedition,' 4to. The book had been anxiously looked for, and almost immediately ran through several editions; four were issued in 1748. It has been since reprinted very many times in its entirety or in abridgments, and is still esteemed as the story of a remarkable voyage extremely well told.

In 1761 a statement was published by Dr. James Wilson, in editing the 'Mathematical Tracts' of Benjamin Robins, to the effect that the real author of the book was Robins, Walter having contributed but a bare skeleton of matter from journals and logs, in a form quite unsuitable for publication. Upon this assertion being repeated in the 'Biographia Britannica' (1789), Walter's widow wrote to John Walter, bookseller at Charing Cross, and 'a relation to the deceased,' positively denying its truth [see under Walter, John, 1739-1812]. 'During the time of Mr. Walter's writing that voyage,' she said, 'he visited me almost daily previous to our marriage, and I have frequently heard him say how closely he had been engaged in writing for some hours to prepare for his constant attendance upon Lord Anson, at six every morning, for his approbation, as his lordship overlooked every sheet that was written. At some of those meetings Mr. Robins assisted, as he was consulted in the disposition of the drawings; and I also know that Mr. Robins left England—for he was sent to Bergen-op-Zoom—some months before the publication of the book; and I have frequently seen Mr. Walter correct the proof-sheets for the printer' (Notes and Queries, 8th ser. ii. 86). Independently of this, the book is unquestionably the work of a man familiar with the daily life on board a ship of war, and that Robins was not. Robins may have taken a greater or less part in the work of revision, but his definitely ascertained share in the book is confined to the discussion of the nautical observations which occupy the second volume.
