= Robert Carter (magistrate) =

Newfoundland politician (1791–1872)

The Honourable Lieutenant Robert Carter MHA

Colonial Secretary (acting)
- In office 1861–1865
- Premier: Hugh Hoyles
- Preceded by: John Kent
- Succeeded by: John Bemister

Colonial Treasurer
- In office October 1849 – May 7, 1855
- Governor: John Le Marchant; Ker Baillie-Hamilton
- Preceded by: Patrick Morris
- Succeeded by: James Tobin (as Financial Secretary)
Legislative offices
Member of the Newfoundland House of Assembly for Fortune Bay
In office November 7, 1859 – November 7, 1865
Preceded by	Hugh Hoyles
Succeeded by	Thomas R. Bennett
Member of the Newfoundland House of Assembly for Bonavista Bay
In office May 7, 1855 – November 7, 1859 Serving with Matthew W. Walbank and John H. Warren
Preceded by	John H. Warren (as single member)
Succeeded by	Stephen March
In office December 20, 1842 – November 18, 1852
Preceded by	Hugh A. Emerson
Succeeded by	John H. Warren
Member of the Newfoundland House of Assembly for Ferryland
In office December 8, 1832 – November 15, 1836
Preceded by	District established
Succeeded by	Patrick Morris

Personal details
- Born: 1791 Ferryland, Newfoundland Colony
- Died: May 25, 1872 (aged 80–81) St. John's, Newfoundland Colony
- Party: Conservative
- Spouse: Anne Hutchings
- Children: 4
- Relatives: Frederick Carter (nephew); Stanley B. Carter (greatnephew)
- Occupation: Naval admiral

Robert Carter (1791 – May 25, 1872) was a Newfoundland naval officer and political figure.

== Biography ==
Carter was born in Ferryland as the son of judge William Carter and Anne Carter (née Weston). He joined the Royal Navy as a young man, retiring as a lieutenant in 1815. Later that year, he was named surrogate magistrate after the death of his brother William, serving until 1826. In 1832, Carter was elected to represent Ferryland in the first general election held in Newfoundland. He was defeated in 1836, but went on to represent Bonavista Bay from 1842 to 1852 and from 1855 to 1849 and Fortune Bay from 1859 to 1865.

Carter also served as a road commissioner for Ferryland and as supervisor of streets for St. John's from 1846 to 1848. In 1849, he was named colonial treasurer and governor of the Newfoundland Savings Bank; he held on to these posts until he was forced out of office by Governor Sir Charles Henry Darling in 1855. Carter served as colonial secretary from 1861 to 1865, retiring from politics later that year. He died in St John's in 1872.
