= John Bingley Garland =

English-Newfoundland politician (1791–1875)

The Honourable John Bingley Garland
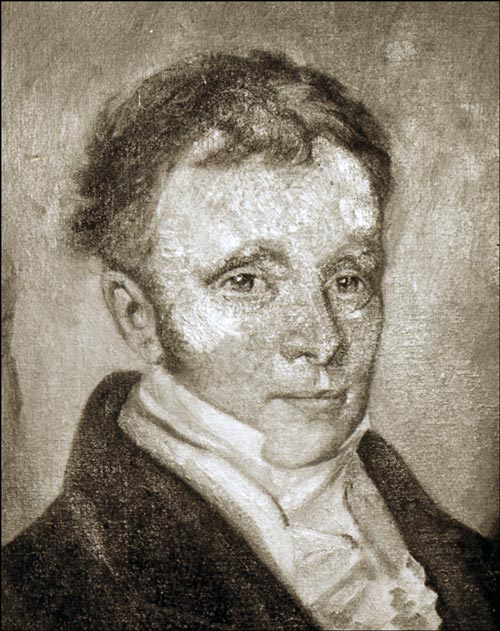

1st Speaker of the Newfoundland House of Assembly
- In office 1833–1833
- Preceded by: Position established
- Succeeded by: Thomas Bennett

Member of the Legislative Council of Newfoundland
- In office 1833–1834
- Appointed by: Sir Thomas John Cochrane

Member of the Newfoundland House of Assembly for Trinity Bay
- In office 8 December 1832 – 1833
- Preceded by: Riding established
- Succeeded by: William Bickford Row

High Sheriff of Dorset
- In office 5 February 1827 – 13 February 1828
- Preceded by: Charles Buxton
- Succeeded by: William Gill Paxton

Mayor of Poole
- In office 1830–1830
- In office 1824–1824

Personal details
- Born: 1791 Poole, England
- Died: 1875 (aged 83–84) Wimborne Minster, England
- Spouse(s): Deborah Vallis (m. 1822–1839) Fanny Marie Read (m. 1840)
- Occupation: Merchant

John Bingley Garland (1791–1875) was an English merchant, politician and artist who became the first Speaker of the House of Assembly of Newfoundland in 1833.

== Political and business career ==
Garland, the son of George Garland Sr. and Amy Lester, was sent to Trinity, Newfoundland, to manage the firm of Garland and Sons. Shortly after arriving, both he and his brother were appointed Justices of the Peace. Both Garlands were responsible for the construction of St. Paul's church in Trinity, which opened in 1821.

Garland returned to England in 1821 and was elected Mayor of Poole in 1824 and in 1830, and picked High Sheriff of Dorset for 1827-28. When George Garland Sr. died, the entire enterprise was handed over to Garland and his brother. The business was a very important mercantile business in the fish trade for Newfoundland. In 1832, Garland with his wife (Deborah Vallis) and children returned to Newfoundland. He ran for the seat in Trinity in the first general election of Newfoundland in 1832. He left the assembly after he was invited by Governor Cochrane to join the Executive Council.

He was married twice: first to Deborah Vallis in 1822 and then, after her death, to Fanny Marie Read.

Garland left Newfoundland in 1834 to return to England following the death of his brother George Garland in 1833.

== Artistry and "blood collages" ==
In the 1850s, Garland created a series of elaborate artworks now known as his "blood collages," apparently made as an act of religious devotion. The pieces assemble cuttings from Old Master prints, book illustrations, art by William Blake, and decorative papers with handwritten Biblical passages and poetry. Garland embellished the compositions with drops of red India ink representing blood. These works, created decades before collage became associated with twentieth-century modernism, have been described as unlike other collages produced in Britain at the time, and as employing techniques more commonly dated to Cubism. Surviving examples are held by institutions including the J. Paul Getty Museum and Minneapolis Institute of Art. Garland called the volume Durenstein!, but scholars such as Roger Whitson refer to it as the Victorian Blood Book. It was presented to the Garland's daughter Amy Lester Garland on the occasion of her 1854 wedding. The book eventually became the property of the writer Evelyn Waugh. With many other of Waugh's papers, it was later acquired by the Harry Ransom Center at the University of Texas at Austin.

John Bingley Garland died at Wimborne, Dorset, at the age of 83.
