= James Crowdy =

Newfoundland politician (1794–1867)

The Honourable James Crowdy MLC

4th Speaker of the Newfoundland House of Assembly
- In office 1843–1848
- Preceded by: William Carson
- Succeeded by: John Kent

Colonial Secretary (Newfoundland)
- In office 1832–1855
- Appointed by: Thomas Cochrane
- Preceded by: Position established
- Succeeded by: John Kent

Member of the Legislative Council of Newfoundland
- In office 1832–1855
- Appointed by: Thomas Cochrane

Colonial Secretary (Cape Breton Island)
- In office 1814–1820

Personal details
- Born: 1794 England
- Died: April 17, 1867 (aged 72–73) Newton Abbot, Devon, England
- Party: Independent
- Spouse(s): Elizabeth (m. ?–1836) Caroline Augusta Dunscombe (m. 1836)
- Children: Charles Crowdy

James Crowdy (1794 – April 17, 1867) was an English-born official in Newfoundland. He was Speaker of the House of Assembly of Newfoundland and Labrador from 1843-48.

== Biography ==
Crowdy served as clerk of the Council and colonial secretary for Cape Breton Island from 1814–20, when it became part of Nova Scotia. In 1831, with his wife Elizabeth, he came to St. John's as clerk of the Council and colonial secretary for Newfoundland. In 1832, he was named to the colony's Council.

In 1836, Crowdy failed to ensure that the great seal was attached to the election writs issued in that year, which led to the invalidation of the results of the election and undermined the authority of representative government in the colony. This was viewed with suspicion since Crowdy was opposed to representative government in Newfoundland. Around the same time, he married Caroline Augusta, the daughter of John Dunscombe; his first wife had died in 1836.

In 1843, the elected assembly and appointed Council were combined and Crowdy was elected speaker. The assembly and Council became separate bodies again in 1848 and Crowdy was again named to the Council. He served briefly as colonial administrator in 1852. Crowdy resigned from the Council in 1855 and returned to England, where he died in 1867 at Newton Abbot, Devon.
