= John Munn (Newfoundland politician) =

Newfoundland politician (1807–1879)

John Munn MHA MLC

Member of the Legislative Council of Newfoundland
- In office June 13, 1855 – 1869
- Nominated by: Philip Little
- Appointed by: Sir Charles Darling
- Succeeded by: Augustus W. Harvey; Robert Thorburn

Member of the Newfoundland House of Assembly for Harbour Grace
- In office November 13, 1869 – November 8, 1873 Serving with William S. Green
- Preceded by: John Hayward
- Succeeded by: Frederick Carter; William Wood

Member of the Newfoundland House of Assembly for Conception Bay
- In office December 20, 1842 – November 20, 1848 Serving with Edmund Hanrahan, James Prendergast, and Thomas Ridley
- Preceded by: Anthony Godfrey; James Power
- Succeeded by: Nicholas Molloy; Richard Rankin

Personal details
- Born: 1807 Port Bannatyne, Buteshire, Scotland, U.K.
- Died: September 29, 1879 (aged 71–72) Southport, Lancashire, England, U.K.
- Party: Conservative
- Spouse: Naomi Munden (m. 1838)
- Relatives: Robert S. Munn (nephew); John S. Munn (grandson)
- Occupation: Merchant, newspaper owner

John Munn (1807 – September 29, 1879) was a Scottish-born merchant and political figure in Newfoundland. He represented Conception Bay from 1842 to 1848 and Harbour Grace from 1869 to 1873 in the Newfoundland and Labrador House of Assembly as a Conservative.

== Business career ==
Mann was born at Port Bannatyne near Rothesay in Scotland, the son of Stewart Munn and Isabella Fisher, and came to St. John's in 1825. He worked there as a bookkeeper until 1833, when he moved to Harbour Grace and opened a business with Captain William Punton. The company became involved in the seal trade and shipbuilding. Munn married Naomi Munden in 1838.

In the 1870s, Munn's company purchased Thomas Ridley's assets. He helped found the Union Bank and served as a director. He also owned the Harbour Grace Standard newspaper.

== Political career and family ==
Munn was named to the Legislative Council in 1855; he served until 1869. Munn died in England in 1879, in Southport, Lancashire. After his death, his company was taken over by his son, William Punton Munn, and nephew, Robert Stewart Munn. William Munn's son, John Shannon Munn (John Munn's grandson), was also prominent in Newfoundland business circles until his death in the wreck of the SS Florizel in 1918.

== Legacy ==
In 2016, John Munn was named a National Historic Person.
