= John Shea (Newfoundland politician) =

Canadian and Irish politician

John Shea (1803 – 1858) was a journalist and political figure in Colony of Newfoundland. He was elected to represent Burin in the Newfoundland and Labrador House of Assembly in 1836.

He was born in St. John's, the son of Henry Shea, an Irish-born merchant, and Eleanor Ryan. Shea married Mary Corbett. He worked in his father's business. In 1827, Shea founded the Newfoundlander. The election of 1836 was declared void and Shea never sat in the assembly.

Around 1837, he moved to Cork in Ireland where he established himself in business. Shea became mayor of Cork in 1850.
