= Joseph Noad =

Newfoundland politician

Joseph Noade (c. 1797 – February 20, 1873) was a public official in Newfoundland. He was a member of the Legislative Council of Newfoundland from 1842 to 1845 and from 1848 to 1855.

Born in County Down, Ireland, Noade came to Newfoundland and soon afterwards, in August 1832, was named surveyor general for the colony. He was a member of the Executive Council from 1842 to 1855. He was also a director of the Newfoundland Steam Navigation Company. Noad was married twice: he married his second wife Emma Gaden Lilly; in 1835. After he was forced into retirement from his appointed positions in 1855 by the introduction of responsible government, he moved to Woodstock, Canada West, where he died in 1873.

In 1859, he published Lecture On The Aborigines Of Newfoundland.
