= Speaker of the Newfoundland and Labrador House of Assembly =

Canadian provincial legislative officer

The Speaker of the House of Assembly of Newfoundland and Labrador is the presiding officer of the Newfoundland and Labrador House of Assembly.

The current Speaker of the Newfoundland and Labrador House of Assembly is Paul Lane who has been serving since November 3, 2025.

== Speakers of the Newfoundland and Labrador House of Assembly ==
| No. | Portrait | Name Electoral district (Birth–Death) | Term of office | Party | General Assembly |
|---|---|---|---|---|---|
| 1 | | John Bingley Garland; MHA for Trinity Bay (1791–1875) | 1833 | Conservative | 1st |
| 2 | | Thomas Bennett; MHA for Fogo (1788–1872) | 1834–1837 | Conservative | 1st |
| 3 | | William Carson; MHA for St. John's (1770–1843) | 1838–1841 | Liberal | 2nd |
| Constitution suspended 1841–1843 | | | | | 2nd |
| 4 | | James Crowdy; MLC (1794–1867) | 1843–1848 | Independent | 3rd |
| 5 | | John Kent; MHA for St. John's (1805–1872) | 1848–1855 | Liberal | 4th |
| 5 | | John Kent; MHA for St. John's (1805–1872) | 1848–1855 | Liberal | 5th |
| 6 | | Ambrose Shea; MHA for St. John's West (until 1859); MHA for Burin (from 1859) (1815–1905) | 1855–1861 | Liberal | 6th |
| 6 | | Ambrose Shea; MHA for St. John's West (until 1859); MHA for Burin (from 1859) (1815–1905) | 1855–1861 | Liberal | 7th |
| 7 | | Frederick Carter; MHA for Trinity Bay (1815–1905) | 1861–1865 | Conservative | 8th |
| 8 | | William Whiteway; MHA for Twillingate and Fogo (1828–1908) | 1865–1870 | Conservative | 9th |
| 9 | | Thomas R. Bennett; MHA for Fortune Bay (1830–1901) | 1870–1873 | Anti-Confederation | 10th |
| 10 | | Prescott Emerson; MHA for Burgeo-La Poile (1840–1889) | 1874–1877 | Conservative | 11th |
| 10 | | Prescott Emerson; MHA for Burgeo-La Poile (1840–1889) | 1874–1877 | Conservative | 12th |
| 11 | | James Spearman Winter; MHA for Burin (1845–1911) | 1877–1879 | Conservative | 12th |
| 12 | | A. J. W. McNeilly; MHA for Twillingate and Fogo (1845–1911) | 1879–1883 | Conservative | 13th |
| 13 | | Robert John Kent; MHA for St. John's East (1835–1893) | 1883–1885 | Coalition | 14th |
| 14 | | Robert Bond; MHA for Trinity Bay (1857–1927) | 1885–1886 | Coalition | 14th |
| (12) | | A. J. W. McNeilly; MHA for Bay de Verde (1845–1911) | 1886–1890 | Reform | 15th |
| 15 | | George Henry Emerson; MHA for Placentia and St. Mary's (1853–1916) | 1890–1894 | Liberal | 16th |
| 16 | | Lawrence O' Brien Furlong; MHA for St. John's East (1856–1908) | 1894–1898 | Liberal | 17th |
| 17 | | Henry Y. Mott; MHA for Burgeo-La Poile (1855–1946) | 1898–1901 | Conservative | 18th |
| (16) | | Lawrence O' Brien Furlong; MHA for St. John's East (1856–1908) | 1901–1905 | Liberal | 19th |
| 18 | | Francis Morris; MHA for Harbour Main (1862–1947) | 1905–1908 | Liberal | 20th |
| Vacant; 1909 | | | | | 21st |
| 19 | | William Warren; MHA for Port de Grave (1879–1929) | 1909–1914 | People's | 22nd |
| 20 | | John R. Goodison; MHA for Carbonear (1866–1926) | 1914–1918 | People's | 23rd |
| 21 | | William J. Higgins; MHA for St. John's East (1880–1943) | 1918–1920 | People's | 23rd |
| 22 | | William F. Penney; MHA for Carbonear (1862–1934) | 1920–1924 | Liberal Reform | 24th |
| 23 | | Harry A. Winter; MHA for Port de Grave (1889–1969) | 1923–1924 | Liberal Reform | 25th |
| 24 | | Cyril J. Fox; MHA for St. John's East (1889–1946) | 1924–1928 | Liberal-Conservative | 26th |
| 25 | | Albert Walsh; MHA for Harbour Main (1900–1958) | 1928–1932 | Liberal | 27th |
| 26 | | James A. Winter; MHA for Burgeo (1886–1971) | 1933–1934 | United Newfoundland | 28th |
Responsible government suspended 1934–1949
| 27 | | Reginald F. Sparkes; MHA for St. Barbe (1906–1990) | 1949–1956 | Liberal | 29th |
| 27 | | Reginald F. Sparkes; MHA for St. Barbe (1906–1990) | 1949–1956 | Liberal | 30th |
| 28 | | John R. Courage; MHA for Fortune Bay and Hermitage (1915–1970) | 1957–1962 | Liberal | 31st |
| 28 | | John R. Courage; MHA for Fortune Bay and Hermitage (1915–1970) | 1957–1962 | Liberal | 32nd |
| 29 | | George W. Clarke; MHA for Carbonear (1910–2000) | 1963–1971 | Liberal | 33rd |
| 29 | | George W. Clarke; MHA for Carbonear (1910–2000) | 1963–1971 | Liberal | 34th |
| Vacant; 1972 | | | | | 35th |
| 30 | | James Russell; MHA for Lewisporte (born 1940) | 1972–1975 | Progressive Conservative | 36th |
| 31 | | Gerry Ottenheimer; MHA for Waterford-Kenmount (1934–1998) | 1975–1979 | Progressive Conservative | 37th |
| 32 | | Len Simms; MHA for Grand Falls (1943–2026) | 1979–1982 | Progressive Conservative | 38th |
| (30) | | James Russell; MHA for Lewisporte (born 1940) | 1982–1985 | Progressive Conservative | 39th |
| 33 | | Patrick McNicholas; MHA for St. John's Centre (1919–1990) | 1985–1989 | Progressive Conservative | 40th |
| 34 | | Tom Lush; MHA for Bonavista North (born 1939) | 1989–1993 | Liberal | 41st |
| 35 | | Paul Dicks; MHA for Humber West (born 1950) | 1993–1995 | Liberal | 42nd |
| 36 | | Lloyd Snow; MHA for Trinity-Bay de Verde (born 1943) | 1995–2003 | Liberal | 42nd |
| 36 | | Lloyd Snow; MHA for Trinity-Bay de Verde (born 1943) | 1995–2003 | Liberal | 43rd |
| 36 | | Lloyd Snow; MHA for Trinity-Bay de Verde (born 1943) | 1995–2003 | Liberal | 44th |
| 37 | | Harvey Hodder; MHA for Waterford Valley (1943–2020) | 2003–2007 | Progressive Conservative | 45th |
| 38 | | Roger Fitzgerald; MHA for Bonavista South (born 1947) | 2007–2011 | Progressive Conservative | 45th |
| 38 | | Roger Fitzgerald; MHA for Bonavista South (born 1947) | 2007–2011 | Progressive Conservative | 46th |
| 39 | | Ross Wiseman; MHA for Trinity North (born 1953) | 2011–2014 | Progressive Conservative | 47th |
| 40 | | Wade Verge; MHA for Lewisporte | 2014–2015 | Progressive Conservative | 47th |
| 41 | | Tom Osborne; MHA for Waterford Valley (born 1964) | 2015–2017 | Liberal | 48th |
| 42 | | Perry Trimper; MHA for Lake Melville | 2017–2019 | Liberal | 48th |
| 43 | | Scott Reid; MHA for St. George's-Humber | 2019–2021 | Liberal | 49th |
| 44 | | Derek Bennett; MHA for Lewisporte-Twillingate | 2021–2025 | Liberal | 50th |
| 45 | | Paul Lane; MHA for Mount Pearl-Southlands | 2025– | Independent | 51st |

== See also ==
- Speaker (politics)
