= James William Tobin =

Newfoundland politician

James William Tobin (1808 – July 24, 1881) was a merchant, official and politician in Newfoundland. He served as a member of the Legislative Council of Newfoundland.

The son of James Tobin, a Halifax merchant, and Eleanor Lanigan, he was born in Halifax, Nova Scotia but had moved to Newfoundland by 1828. Tobin formed a firm in partnership with John Bayley Bland in 1831 which operated a packet service between Halifax and St. John's, and was also involved in general inter-colonial trade. The partnership was dissolved in 1839 but Tobin continued operations in partnership with James B. Hutton. The new firm, James Tobin and Company, also became heavily involved in the seal fishery. In 1834, he married Emily Cecilia Bullen.

Tobin was named to the Executive Council in 1841 and became a member of the amalgamated legislature in 1842. In 1848, when the assembly and council were again split, he continued as a member of the Executive Council. In 1849, Tobin was named a special stipendiary and a customs inspector for St. George's. However, he was unpopular and was removed from these posts in 1853. In 1855, Tobin presented himself as a candidate for the Placentia and St. Mary's seat in the assembly; however, he withdrew his candidacy after he was named to the Legislative Council.

Tobin died in London, England at the age of 73.
