= Newman Wright Hoyles =

Newfoundland politician

Newman Wright Hoyles (30 August 1777 – 29 February 1840) was an English-born ship’s captain, merchant and politician who became Colonial Treasurer of Newfoundland Colony after the introduction of representative government in 1832.

== Early life and maritime career ==
Hoyles was born in Dartmouth, England, the second son of William Hoyles and Anne Wright. He went to sea at the age of 15 and by 21 was captain of a brig trading on North Atlantic routes, including regular calls at Newfoundland ports. In 1806 he entered a mercantile partnership with Thomas Follett, associated with a long-established Newfoundland firm of Devonshire origin.

In 1801, Hoyles married Lucretia Brown in Dartmouth; the couple had three sons and six daughters. Through this marriage he strengthened his connections to Newfoundland, since Lucretia was the daughter of a doctor attached to the military garrison at Placentia (Newfoundland).

== Mercantile and civic activity in Newfoundland ==
Hoyles became a permanent resident of St. John’s no later than 1810 and took part in merchant meetings setting seasonal prices for fish and cod oil. He expanded into insurance and brokerage: in 1812 he served as agent of the Marine Insurance Society in St. John’s, operated an insurance brokerage by 1815, and was appointed an agent of Lloyd's of London shortly thereafter.

A further partnership formed in 1813 with Hugh William Brown (probably a brother-in-law) created Brown, Hoyles and Company, with branches at Port de Grave and Trepassey and fishing interests extending to the Labrador coast; the firm imported goods and exported fish and also owned sea-going vessels.

In the 1810s and 1820s, Hoyles was active in local civic and commercial bodies in St. John’s, including merchant organizations and committees concerned with pilotage, harbour safety, and municipal regulation. He also served in roles such as Anglican churchwarden and was involved in charitable and educational initiatives in the town.

== Political career ==
Hoyles supported the establishment of a local legislature and participated in reform-minded petitions and committees in the 1820s advocating representative government and greater local control over expenditure.

When representative government was granted in 1832, Hoyles—having divested himself of his mercantile interests—was elected to the Newfoundland House of Assembly for Fortune Bay. In December 1832 he was appointed Colonial Treasurer. In the assembly he introduced or supported measures dealing with municipal regulation and public safety, including proposed legislation on pilotage, storage of gunpowder, fire protection, and responses to infectious disease, as well as bills related to relief for disabled seamen and fishermen and the establishment of hospitals.

During the developing party conflicts of the early 1830s, Hoyles’s position as colonial treasurer brought him into dispute with reformers in the assembly, notably after he made a payment in November 1834 under an unconstitutional warrant issued by Governor Thomas John Cochrane. Hoyles did not sit in the assembly after 1836, but he retained the office of colonial treasurer until his death in St. John’s on 29 February 1840.

== Family ==
Hoyles’ son Sir Hugh William Hoyles (1814–1888) became a lawyer and politician and later served as the third Premier of Newfoundland (1861–1865).
