= Roger Sweetman (Newfoundland politician) =

Newfoundland politician

Roger Forstall Sweetman (died 1862) was a merchant and political figure in Colony of Newfoundland. He represented Placentia and St. Mary's in the Newfoundland and Labrador House of Assembly from 1832 to 1836.

He was the son of Pierce Sweetman, an Irish merchant, and Juliet Forstall. Sweetman may have been born in Ireland. He came to Placentia in 1813 to look over the activities of the family business there. Sweetman was named a justice of the peace for the Southern district in 1834; he also served as a road commissioner and as a member of the board of education. He took over the family business when his father died in 1841. Sweetman was involved in fishing and the seal fishery.
