= William Brown (Newfoundland politician) =

Newfoundland politician

Member of the House of Assembly for Bonavista Bay
- In office 1832–1836
- Preceded by: Position established
- Succeeded by: Hugh A. Emerson

Personal details
- Party: Conservative

William Brown was a politician in Newfoundland. He represented the district of Bonavista Bay in the House of Assembly from 1832 to 1836.

Brown's grandson, Kenneth M. Brown, served in the House of Assembly from 1923–1934.
