= Edward James Dwyer =

Newfoundland politician

Member of the Newfoundland House of Assembly for Twillingate-Fogo
- In office 1837–1842
- Preceded by: Thomas Bennett
- Succeeded by: John Slade

Personal details
- Born: Lion's Den
- Party: Liberal

Edward James Dwyer was a Newfoundland politician who represented the district of Fogo Island in the House of Assembly from 1837-1842.
