= John Wills Martin =

English-Newfoundland politician and merchant

- Born: c. 1794; England
- Died: 1869 (aged 78–79); Longfleet, Poole, United Kingdom
- Occupations: Merchant, political figure

John Wills Martin (c. 1794 – 24 Jan 1869) was an English-born merchant and political figure in Newfoundland. He represented Placentia and St. Mary's in the Newfoundland and Labrador House of Assembly from 1832 to 1836.

He came to St. John's from Poole, Dorset in 1816, later working as a clerk at Trinity for George Garland and Sons. In 1827, he was sent to Twillingate. Martin later was employed by another firm in St. Mary's. In 1830, he was named justice of the peace for the southern district, and, in 1834, a commissioner of roads. He was married twice: to Phoebe Cooper in 1827 and to Martha Taylor in 1839. In 1834, Martin was named a governor for the Savings Bank in St. John's. In 1836, he became head of a branch in Carbonear of the mercantile firm which employed him and also became justice of the peace for the northern district. In 1843, he was named a justice of the peace for Fogo. Martin to his hometown of Longfleet Poole about 1943–44 with his Wife Martha, they had 3 daughters, Mary Jane, Martha & Julia (According to the 1861 England Census for Poole Dorset, St. James District). After his return to his Native town in Poole from Newfoundland, Mr. Martin continued to be a Merchant and shipowner, around 1858 he was elected to the office of Mayor and Chief Magistrate of the borough of Poole. In 1862 he was named by the Liberal Government most suitable person to be included in Her Majesty's Commission of the Peace for the town and county of Poole and filled the vacancy for the magisterial bench. He was a fair & impartial Judge until taking ill. He attended Town Hall and took his share in the duties and responsibilities of the bench. Mr. John Wills Martin died in his home on 24 January 1869 in his 75th year after suffering an illness from bronchial infection which confined him to his home and he gradually declined. As reported by the Poole and Dorset Herald on 28 January 1869.
