= William Hooper (Newfoundland politician) =

Newfoundland politician (1787–1864)

- Born: 1787; Poole, Dorset
- Died: October 1, 1864 (aged 76–77); Burin, Newfoundland
- Occupations: merchant and political figure in Newfoundland

William Hooper (1787 – October 1, 1864) was an English-born merchant and political figure in Newfoundland. He represented Burin the Newfoundland and Labrador House of Assembly from 1832 to 1836.

Hooper was born in Poole, Dorset and came to Newfoundland around 1810. He operated a business in Burin where he settled and a general store at Mortier on Placentia Bay in partnership with William Harrison. His attendance in the assembly was spotty and Hooper did not seek reelection. In 1838, he was named a justice of the peace for the Southern district. Hooper died at Burin in 1864.
