= Charles Cozens =

Newfoundland politician

Charles Cozens (1784 – August 6, 1863), politician, magistrate, was elected to the House of Assembly representing the district of Conception Bay on the first general election held in Newfoundland in 1832.

Cozens was born at Blandford, Dorset England and immigrated to Newfoundland in the early 19th century. He was a cooper by trade and is accredited with establishing the road from Brigus to Makinsons. Cozens served for only one term at the Newfoundland House of Assembly and did not run in the general election that was held in 1836. He was appointed Stipendiary magistrate for Brigus, a position he held until his death on August 6, 1863.

== See also ==
- List of people of Newfoundland and Labrador
- List of communities in Newfoundland and Labrador
