= Robert Pack (politician) =

Newfoundland merchant and politician (1786–1860)

Robert Pack MHA

Member of the Newfoundland House of Assembly for Conception Bay
- In office 1832–1836
- Monarch: William IV
- Preceded by: office established
- Succeeded by: James Power

Personal details
- Born: Robert Pack; 27 October 1786 Poole, Dorset, England
- Died: 29 February 1860 (aged 73) Carbonear, Colony of Newfoundland
- Party: Liberal
- Spouse: Ann Ash
- Occupation: Politician, Businessman, Justice of the Peace

Robert Pack (1786 in Poole, Dorset, England – 1860 in Carbonear, Newfoundland) was a merchant, politician and justice of the peace was elected to the Newfoundland House of Assembly representing the district of Conception Bay on the first general election held in Newfoundland in 1832.

== See also ==
- List of people of Newfoundland and Labrador
