= John Kent (Newfoundland politician) =

Premier of Newfoundland (1805–1872)

The Honourable John Kent
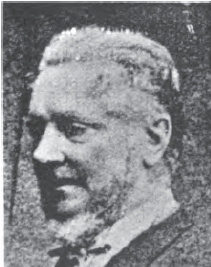

2nd Premier of Newfoundland
- In office July 16, 1858 – March 1, 1861
- Monarch: Victoria
- Governor: Alexander Bannerman
- Preceded by: Philip Francis Little
- Succeeded by: Hugh Hoyles
Ministerial offices
Attorney General
In office 1865–1869
Premier	Frederick Carter
Preceded by	George Hogsett
Succeeded by	Joseph Little
Colonial Secretary
In office 1855–1861
Premier	Philip Little; Himself
Preceded by	James Crowdy
Succeeded by	Robert Carter (acting)
Legislative offices
5th Speaker of the Newfoundland House of Assembly
In office December 14, 1848 – November 30, 1854
Preceded by	James Crowdy
Succeeded by	Ambrose Shea
Member of the Newfoundland House of Assembly for St. John's East St. John's (1832–1855)
In office November 20, 1848 – November 13, 1869 Serving with Laurence O'Brien (1848–1850); Robert Parsons (1848–1869); Philip Little (1850–1855); Peter Winser (1855–1857); John Kavanagh (1857–1869)
Preceded by	John V. Nugent
Succeeded by	James Jordan; William P. Walsh
In office November 12, 1832 – December 20, 1842 Serving with William Thomas (1832–1833); Patrick Kough (1832–1836); William Carson (1833–1842); Patrick Morris (1836–1842)
Preceded by	District established
Succeeded by	John V. Nugent

Personal details
- Born: 1805 County Waterford, Ireland
- Died: 1 September 1872 (aged 66–67) St. John's, Newfoundland Colony
- Party: Liberal (1832–1865); Conservative (1865–1869)
- Spouse: Johanna Fleming (m. 1834)
- Relatives: Patrick Morris (uncle); Michael Fleming (brother-in-law); Robert John Kent (nephew); Edward Morris (cousin)
- Occupation: Businessman

John Kent (1805 – September 1, 1872) was an Irish-born politician who served as the second Premier of the Newfoundland Colony.

== Early life ==
Kent was born in County Waterford, Ireland in 1805. He arrived in St. John's, Newfoundland in 1820 as an employee of his uncle, Patrick Morris, a successful businessman and political reformer. Kent had become well-known in St. John's in his own right by 1830 as an auctioneer. He had a close relationship with Catholic Bishop Michael Anthony Fleming, who became Kent's brother-in-law upon his marriage to Fleming's sister Johanna Fleming in 1834.

== Politics ==
Kent was involved in the movement for electoral reform led by his uncle Patrick Morris and William Carson. When the British Colonial Office granted representative government to Newfoundland in 1832, he was elected to the first House of Assembly as a Liberal with the help of Bishop Fleming. Kent expressed dissatisfaction with the constitution of the time, believing it was "half-developed" and gave too much power to the small Council comprising the legislature's upper house.

Kent's electioneering was a compound of his own strident vitality, intimidation, and clerical influence. Newfoundland in 1832 had virtually universal suffrage under a household franchise, and it was not difficult to secure election by turbulent, and very effective means. Kent was of the school of Reformers who relished quarrels with authority.

— Waite on Kent's advocacy for Catholic rights, 1972

Kent was an empassioned champion of Catholic rights on an island which was then deeply divided along denominational lines. P. B. Waite described him as a demagogue who "enjoyed the storm and rode it to his own advantage." Kent's fiery rhetoric brought him into conflict with local surgeon Edward Kielley, who threatened to assault him in August 1838. The resulting legal case, Kielley v. Carson, lasted for several years. While the Supreme Court of Newfoundland found Kielley guilty, their decision was overruled by the Privy Council in 1842, which ruled that parliamentary privileges enjoyed in the House of Commons did not necessarily extend to colonial legislatures.

Kent was nominated to the Council in 1842 under the amalgamated legislature instituted by Governor John Harvey, but he returned to the House when they were separated again in 1848. That year, he was elected as the Speaker of the House of Assembly. By this time, he was an advocate of responsible government, which was granted to the colony of Newfoundland in 1855. Kent was appointed as the Colonial Secretary in the Executive Council of Philip Francis Little, the island's first premier.

== Premiership (1858–1861) ==
Kent became Premier after Little resigned in 1858. Although the Liberals won the 1859 election, the prosperity of Little's premiership had ended with a drop in colonial revenues in 1859. Kent was unable to command the Liberal caucus as effectively as Little had. He ran into conflict with Governor Alexander Bannerman, who believed Kent's "dictatorial methods" were ill-suited for negotiations with France regarding the French Shore. He also clashed with Fleming's successor Bishop John Thomas Mullock.

Kent's government was engulfed by crisis in 1861 when Receiver General Thomas Glen filed a motion to lower the salary of government officials. When this bill faced legal threats from various government employees, Kent accused Governor Bannerman of colluding with the Conservative Party and the aforementioned judges. After Bannerman asked for clarification on what Kent meant and Kent refused to elaborate, Kent's government was dissolved on March 1, 1861, and Conservative leader Hugh Hoyles was appointed Premier in his stead. Kent was taken aback by this move and called it a "gross act of treachery".

The Liberals defeated the Conservative government in a Motion of No Confidence. The subsequent 1861 election was plagued by sectarian violence. Although Kent himself was re-elected the Conservatives gained a narrow victory over the Liberal party, reaffirming Hoyles' premiership.

Kent spent his last few years in the House of Assembly as a supporter of Newfoundland's confederation into Canada. He was amongst the delegates sent to Ottawa in 1869 to discuss the possibility of Confederation. He retired that same year and did not run in the 1869 election.

== Death ==
Kent died suddenly in St. John's on September 1, 1872. His wife Johanna and at least two of their children survived him.

Political offices
Preceded by James Crowdy	Speaker of the Newfoundland House of Assembly; 1848–1855	Succeeded by Ambrose Shea
Preceded by Philip Francis Little	Premier of Newfoundland; 1858–1861	Succeeded by Hugh W. Hoyles
