= Thomas Fitzgibbon Moore =

Newfoundland politician

Thomas Fitzgibbon Moore was a constable and politician in Newfoundland. He represented Trinity Bay in the Newfoundland House of Assembly.

Moore arrived in the New Harbour area on Trinity Bay from Ireland or France in the early 1800s. Apparently, he was originally known as Thomas Fitzgibbon. He became a constable at Dildo by 1822. Moore was elected to the Newfoundland assembly in 1837.
