= Anthony Godfrey (politician) =

Newfoundland politician

Anthony Godfrey was a politician from Newfoundland. Godfrey represented the district of Conception Bay in the House of Assembly from 1836 to 1840. Godfrey first ran in the 1836 election for the Liberal Party where he would receive 73 votes. A year later in 1837, another election would be called. This time, Godfrey would go unchallenged and would win by acclimation. In 1840, Godfrey would die, however, it would not be until 1842 that his seat would be filled.
