= Hugh A. Emerson =

Newfoundland politician

Hugh Alexander Emerson (1793 – May 29, 1860) was a lawyer and politician in Newfoundland. He represented Bonavista Bay in the Newfoundland House of Assembly from 1837 to 1842.

He was called to the Newfoundland bar in 1829. Emerson was a candidate in the 1832 general election, losing to William Brown. He subsequently tried unsuccessfully to have Brown unseated, citing irregularities. He was elected to the Newfoundland assembly in 1837. Emerson was Solicitor General for Newfoundland from 1837 to 1854. In 1849, he was named Master in Chancery for the Newfoundland Supreme Court. He was also a member of the Legislative Council from 1845 to 1855.

Emerson retired to London, where he died in 1860.

His brother George was also a lawyer and served in the Newfoundland assembly.
