= William Thomas (Newfoundland politician) =

Newfoundland politician (1785–1863)

William Thomas (1785 – November 5, 1863) was an English-born merchant and politician. Thomas was elected to the House of Assembly representing the district of St. John's on the first general election held in Newfoundland in 1832.

Thomas was active in the effort to earn Newfoundland its own parliament and was appointed to the committee "to petition his majesty for a legislature." He was also active in the concerns of the poor, serving on numerous committees to help improve their condition, including work on a commission to assign work to those on welfare.

Thomas was born in Dartmouth, Devon. He came to Newfoundland in 1801 and entered business in partnership with his brother Henry. Thomas was named to the colony's three-person Executive Council in 1833, working on early efforts to establish self-governance for Newfoundland. He returned to England around 1850, and died at Huyton.

== See also ==
- List of people of Newfoundland and Labrador
