= Edmund Hanrahan =

Newfoundland politician

Edmund Hanrahan MHA

Member of the Newfoundland House of Assembly for Conception Bay and Carbonear
- In office 1842–1865
- Monarch: Queen Victoria
- Premier: Philip Francis Little; John Kent; Hugh Hoyles
- Preceded by: James Power
- Succeeded by: John Rorke

Personal details
- Born: Edmund Hanrahan; 1802 Carbonear, Colony of Newfoundland
- Died: February 1875 (aged 72–73) Ferryland, Colony of Newfoundland
- Party: Liberal
- Occupation: Politician, Businessman

Edmund Hanrahan (1802 – February 1875) was a political figure in Newfoundland. He represented Conception Bay from 1842 to 1854 and Carbonear from 1855 to 1862 in the Newfoundland and Labrador House of Assembly as a Liberal.

Hanrahan was born in Carbonear. He served in the Newfoundland cabinet as surveyor general from 1855 to 1861. Hanrahan resigned his seat in 1862 after he was named acting appraiser to the General Water Company. In 1863, he was named stipendiary magistrate at Ferryland. He was named sheriff for the southern district in 1872. Hanrahan died in Ferryland in 1875.
