= Henry Prescott =

Royal Navy Admiral (1783–1874)

Admiral Sir Henry Prescott GCB
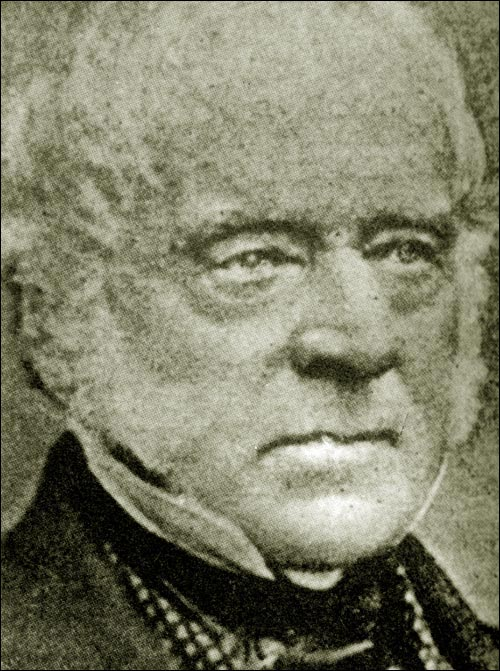
- Born: 4 May 1783; Kew Green, London, England
- Died: 18 November 1874 (aged 91) Bayswater, London, England
- Buried: Kensal Green Cemetery, London, England
- Allegiance: Great Britain; United Kingdom
- Branch: Royal Navy
- Service years: 1796–1860
- Rank: Admiral
- Commands: HMS Weazel; HMS Fylla; HMS Eridanus; HMS Aurora
- Conflicts: French Revolutionary Wars; Egyptian Campaign; Napoleonic Wars; Battle of Cape Ortegal
- Awards: Companion of the Order of the Bath (1815); Knight Commander of the Order of the Bath (1856); Knight Grand Cross of the Order of the Bath (1869)
- Other work: Governor of Newfoundland (1834–1841)

Viceregal styles of Sir Henry Prescott
- Reference style: His Excellency
- Spoken style: Your Excellency

Admiral Sir Henry Prescott GCB (4 May 1783 – 18 November 1874) was an officer of the Royal Navy who served during the French Revolutionary and Napoleonic Wars, and was later the Governor of the Newfoundland Colony.

== Biography ==
=== Family background ===
Prescott was born 4 May 1783 at Kew, Surrey, the son of Admiral Isaac Prescott and a daughter of the Reverend Richard Walter, who served as chaplain aboard the Centurion during Commodore George Anson's expedition to the Pacific, and was the author of A Voyage Round the World, in the Years 1740–44 (1748). Prescott's only brother, an infantry officer in the East India Company's service, was drowned during a voyage home in 1806.

=== Junior officer ===
Prescott entered the Navy on 16 February 1796 as first-class volunteer on board the 98-gun ship of the line Formidable, serving under Captains the Honourable George Cranfield Berkeley and John Irwin, stationed in the Channel. He was rated as a midshipman in April 1797, and in early 1798 followed Admiral Sir Charles Thompson (whose flag had been flying on board Formidable) into the 100-gun Queen Charlotte.

In 1799, he sailed to the Mediterranean aboard the frigate Penelope, Captain the Honourable Henry Blackwood, where on 31 March 1800 he took part in the capture of the Guillaume Tell of 84 guns and 1,000 men. He afterwards took part in the Egyptian Campaign of 1801; and on 17 February 1802, while serving under Lord Keith in the 80-gun ship Foudroyant, was appointed acting-lieutenant of the brig Vincejo, Captain James Prevost, and his commission was confirmed on 28 April 1802. He then served on the frigate Unicorn, Captain Lucius Ferdinand Hardyman, in the North Sea from 26 April 1803. On 14 December 1804, he moved to the frigate Aeolus, Captain Lord William FitzRoy, seeing action in the Battle of Cape Ortegal on 4 November 1805, when a squadron under Sir Richard Strachan fought four ships escaped from Trafalgar. He subsequently served aboard Lord Eldon, Captain George B. Whinyates; the 74-gun Ajax, Captain Henry Blackwood; and the 98-gun Ocean, flagship of Lord Collingwood, all in the Mediterranean.

=== Commander ===
On 4 February, 1808 he was promoted to commander in the 18-gun brig Weazel. On 1 April off Sardinia, he fell in with a French fleet of ten ships of the line, three frigates, a brig, and a store-ship, and after making a reconnaissance on the next day, sailed to report their position to Collingwood, who was cruising with a more powerful force near Sicily. Unfortunately, adverse winds prevented Collingwood from intercepting the French before they reached the safety of Toulon. While employed on the coast of Naples, Prescott was employed in attacking coastal traffic. He first drove a French 20-gun brig to seek refuge under shore batteries. He attempted to entice her out, and although she was supported by 11 Neapolitan gun-boats, she refused. On 8 September 1808, he contributed to the capture of four large gunboats and 34 coasting vessels assembled at Diamante near the Gulf of Policastro, which he blockaded until the arrival from Sicily of a force sufficient to capture them. On 27 October 1809, he captured the French letter of marque Veloce, of 4 guns and 83 men; and on 25 December, after a chase of nine hours and an action lasting one and a half hours, the polacre rigged privateer Eole of 14 guns and 140 men, five of whom were killed and nine wounded, with a loss of only one man killed and one wounded. Between then and June 1810, Weazel was employed off Sardinia, where she took and re-captured 17 vessels, including the French privateer schooner Ippolite, of 5 guns and 78 men. She next took part in the defence of Sicily, coming into frequent contact with the flotilla equipped by Joachim Murat for his attempted invasion of the island. On 25 July 1810, Weazel, the frigate Thames, and the 18-gun brig-sloop Pilot, forced a convoy of 31 vessels, protected by seven large gunboats and five scampavias, to seek refuge at Amantea, under the protection of two shore batteries. Prescott led in the boats of the three British ships, and despite heavy enemy fire, captured or destroyed all the vessels. Two days later Prescott returned to Amantea with a detachment of marines from Cumberland, destroyed several vessels, and captured a gun under a heavy fire of musketry, and having only three men wounded. The following month he twice engaged convoys, and captured six vessels, although he was obliged to abandon two — an armed xebec and a gunboat — as a sudden shift of wind direction, and the Weazle's mainyard being shot away, it became impossible for her to tow them out from under a shore battery. In 1847, a clasp to the Naval General Service Medal "Amanthea 25 July 1810" was awarded to any surviving claimants from the action of that day.

=== Post-captain and Governor ===
He was rewarded for his actions at Amantea by receiving promotion to post-captain with seniority backdated to 25 July 1810, but did not leave Weazle until February 1811. He was appointed to command of the 20-gun sloop Fylla on 7 August 1811 off the Channel Islands. On 3 June 1813, he took command of the frigate Eridanus and was employed in the Bay of Biscay until April 1815. He was made a Companion of the Order of the Bath on 4 June 1815.

He returned to sea duty on 6 April 1821 in command of the 46-gun frigate Aurora as senior officer on the coast of Brazil and also spent 18 months in the Pacific protecting British interests during the Spanish American wars of independence. In 1822, the Congress of Peru demanded a contribution from the merchants of Lima, the British proportion amounting to nearly 200,000 dollars. Prescott not only protested, but took measures such that the Congress abandoned the idea. As a mark of their respect and gratitude, the British merchants at Lima voted the sum of 1,500 dollars to buy him a testimonial. In February 1825, he returned to England.

On 24 September 1834, Prescott was appointed Governor and Commander-in-Chief of Newfoundland and its dependencies, He arrived in St John's in November, into a turbulent situation riven by political and religious acrimony. Prescott attempted to mediate between the opposing factions, but could make few decisions without angering one or the other. He attempted to resign in January 1839, but this was not accepted. Prescott finally resigned in May 1841. Despite the difficulties he made several improvements; passing an education act, which created the first non-denominational elementary schools, appointing road commissioners to improve transport, and encouraging agriculture. Prescott was not a trained administrator, but made several suggestions to improve the governance of the colony.

Prescott Street in St. John's is named for Henry Prescott.

=== Admiral ===
Prescott was awarded the Captain's Good Service Pension on 1 April 1844, and was promoted to rear admiral on 24 April 1847, serving on the Board of Admiralty as Second Naval Lord from 20 July before being appointed Admiral-Superintendent at Portsmouth Naval Dockyard on 15 December and serving there until 1852.

He was promoted to vice-admiral on 1 May 1854, made a Knight Commander of the Order of the Bath on 5 February 1856, promoted to admiral on 11 May 1860, officially retiring from the Navy on 9 June 1860.

He was made a Knight Grand Cross of the Order of the Bath on 2 June 1869, and for a time was Justice of the Peace for Surrey.

He died at his home No. 7 Leinster Gardens, Bayswater, London, on 18 November 1874, and is buried at Kensal Green Cemetery.

== Personal life ==
On 5 July 1815, he married Mary Anne Charlotte, the eldest daughter of Vice-Admiral Philippe d'Auvergne, and had several children. His son, the Reverend Isaac Philip Prescott (d. 1898) married Caroline Mary Parke, daughter of Captain Edward Parke, RN, in 1842, and served as rector of Kelly, Devon. His daughter Henrietta (d. 1875), married Admiral Sir Stephen Lushington, and was the author of Poems, written in Newfoundland (1839) and The Sea Spirit and Other Poems (1850). His second daughter Catherine married Louis Diston Powles.

== See also ==
- List of people of Newfoundland and Labrador
- O'Byrne, William Richard (1849). "Prescott, Henry" . A Naval Biographical Dictionary . John Murray – via Wikisource.

Political offices
Preceded by Sir Thomas John Cochrane	Governor of Newfoundland; 1834–1841	Succeeded by Sir John Harvey
Military offices
Preceded by Sir James Dundas	Second Naval Lord; July 1847 – December 1847	Succeeded by Sir Maurice Berkeley
