= Thomas Bennett (Newfoundland politician) =

English-born Newfoundland politician (1788–1872)

The Honourable Thomas Bennett MHA

2nd Speaker of the Newfoundland House of Assembly
- In office 1834–1837
- Preceded by: John Bingley Garland
- Succeeded by: William Carson

Member of the Newfoundland House of Assembly for Twillingate and Fogo
- In office December 8, 1832 – May 25, 1837
- Preceded by: Riding established
- Succeeded by: Edward J. Dwyer

Personal details
- Born: October 15, 1788 Shaftesbury, Dorset, England
- Died: February 12, 1872 (aged 83) Shaftesbury, Dorset, England
- Party: Conservative
- Spouse: Hannah Hutchings (m. 1828)
- Relatives: Charles Fox Bennett (brother)

Thomas Bennett (October 15, 1788 – February 12, 1872) was a magistrate and political figure in Newfoundland.

== Early life and business career ==
Born in Shaftesbury, Dorsetshire, England, Bennett first worked for the British government in the Commissariat Department and moved to St. John's, Newfoundland, in the early 1820s to work in his brother Charles' mercantile business. Both brothers became important members of the business community and his brother later served as Premier of Newfoundland.

In 1828, Bennett married Hannah Hutchings.

== Politics ==
Bennett entered politics in 1832 running for House of Assembly for Twillingate and Fogo. He became Speaker of the House of Assembly in 1834 opposing William Carson as a conservative supporter and remained as speaker until 1837 when he did not run for election. Bennett also held a number of appointed positions in the government after he chose not to run for further office. He was chosen for these appointments because the governor, Sir John Harvey, wanted both brothers to be part of the newly formed government.

Bennett remained active in politics until he was appointed as a stipendiary magistrate, remaining in that post until his retirement in 1870. In 1870, after his brother Charles became Premier of Newfoundland, Thomas returned to England. He died in Shaftesbury at the age of 83.

=== Portrait ===
In 1949, Premier Joey Smallwood, commissioned portraits of former speakers. Bennett, having no known likeness, was not painted. Starting in 2004, the House of Assembly Legislative Library began searching for an existing photograph of Bennett. Eventually, one was located. In 2008, his portrait was officially unveiled at the House of Assembly.
