= William Carson =

Newfoundland reformer and politician (1770–1843)

The Honourable Sir William Carson MHA

3rd Speaker of the Newfoundland House of Assembly
- In office 1838–1841
- Preceded by: Thomas Bennett
- Succeeded by: James Crowdy

Member of the Newfoundland House of Assembly for St. John's
- In office December 1833 – February 26, 1843 Serving with John Kent (1833–1842); Patrick Kough (1833–1836); Patrick Morris (1836–1840); Laurence O'Brien (1840–1843); John V. Nugent (1842–1843)
- Preceded by: William Thomas
- Succeeded by: Robert John Parsons

Personal details
- Born: c. June 4, 1770 Kelton, Scotland
- Died: February 26, 1843 (aged 72) St. John's, Newfoundland Colony
- Resting place: Anglican Cathedral of St. John the Baptist, St. John's
- Party: Liberal
- Spouse: Esther (Giles?)
- Children: 8
- Education: University of Edinburgh
- Occupation: Medical doctor, businessman

Sir William Carson (baptised June 4, 1770 – February 26, 1843), often called "The Great Reformer", was a Scottish-born businessman, medical doctor, and politician in the Newfoundland Colony. He was one of the foremost advocates for representative government in Newfoundland, which resulted in the creation of a bicameral legislature (the House of Assembly and the Council) in 1832.

== Education and agricultural work ==
Carson was born in the parish of Kelton in Kirkcudbrightshire, Scotland as the son of Samuel Carson and Margaret (née Clachertie). He studied medicine at the University of Edinburgh, but it is unclear if he graduated. Upon immigrating to Newfoundland in 1806 from Scotland, Carson set to work clearing a large patch of land near St. John's. He also began calling for increased economic support from England, a more organized fishery in the area and better treatment of the local natives.

== Politics ==
Between 1820 and 1832, he helped lead the movement in Newfoundland's struggle for representative government, which culminated in Carson's election to office in 1832. While in office, he was noted for helping quarantine an outbreak of cholera in the area.

From 1838 to 1841, Carson was Speaker of the Newfoundland House of Assembly.

Carson died in St. John's on February 26, 1843, and he is buried at the churchyard cemetery in the Anglican Cathedral of St. John the Baptist.

== Legacy ==
The CN Marine ferry M/V William Carson was named in his honour.
