= Patrick Kough =

Irish-Newfoundland politician

Patrick Kough (ca 1786 – 9 November 1863) was an Irish-born builder, architect and political figure in Newfoundland. He represented St. John's in the Newfoundland and Labrador House of Assembly from 1832 to 1836.

Kough was born in County Wexford and came to St. John's around 1804. In 1830–1, he built a court house and jail at Harbour Grace. Shortly afterwards, he replaced the roof of Government House in St. John's after it was blown away in a storm. In 1826, he became captain of the fire company in St. John's. Kough served as superintendent for public buildings in Newfoundland from 1834 to 1863. He was a member of the Legislative Council from 1860 to 1863. He also operated a farm near St. John's and served as president of the agricultural society. Kough died in St. John's in 1863.
