= Thomas John Cochrane =

Royal Navy Admiral of the Fleet (1789–1872)

Admiral of the Fleet Sir Thomas John Cochrane GCB
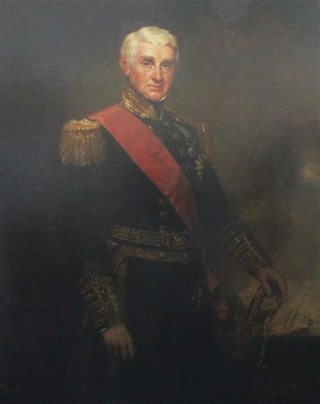
- Admiral Sir Thomas Cochrane

43rd Governor of Newfoundland
- In office 1825–1834
- Monarchs: George IV; William IV
- Preceded by: Sir Charles Hamilton
- Succeeded by: Sir Henry Prescott

Member of Parliament for Ipswich
- In office 1839–1841 Serving with Fitzroy Kelly
- Preceded by: Thomas Milner Gibson; Fitzroy Kelly
- Succeeded by: Rigby Wason; George Rennie

Commander-in-Chief, East Indies and China Station
- In office 1844–1846
- Monarch: Victoria
- Preceded by: Sir William Parker
- Succeeded by: Samuel Inglefield

Commander-in-Chief, Portsmouth
- In office 1852–1856
- Monarch: Victoria
- Preceded by: Sir Thomas Briggs
- Succeeded by: Sir George Seymour
- Military career
- Born: 5 February 1789; Edinburgh, Scotland, United Kingdom
- Died: 19 October 1872 (aged 83); Quarr Abbey House, Isle of Wight, Hampshire, England
- Burial place: Kensal Green Cemetery
- Allegiance: United Kingdom
- Branch: Royal Navy
- Service years: 1796–1856
- Rank: Admiral of the Fleet
- Commands: HMS Nimrod; HMS Jason; HMS Ethalion; HMS Surprise; HMS Forte; Governor of Newfoundland; East Indies and China Station; Portsmouth Command
- Conflicts: French Revolutionary Wars; Napoleonic Wars; War of 1812; First Opium War; Anglo-Bruneian War
- Awards: Knight Grand Cross of the Order of the Bath

Viceregal styles of Sir Thomas John Cochrane
- Reference style: His Excellency
- Spoken style: Your Excellency

Admiral of the Fleet Sir Thomas John Cochrane, GCB (5 February 1789 – 19 October 1872) was a Royal Navy officer. After serving as a junior officer during the French Revolutionary Wars, he captured the French ship Favourite off the coast of Dutch Guiana and then took part in various actions including the capture of the Virgin Islands from Danish forces, the capture of the French island of Martinique and the capture of the French archipelago of Îles des Saintes during the Napoleonic Wars. He also took part in the burning of Washington and the attack on Baltimore during the War of 1812.

Cochrane went on to serve as colonial governor of Newfoundland and then as Member of Parliament for Ipswich before becoming Commander-in-Chief, East Indies and China Station and then Commander-in-Chief, Portsmouth.

== Early career ==
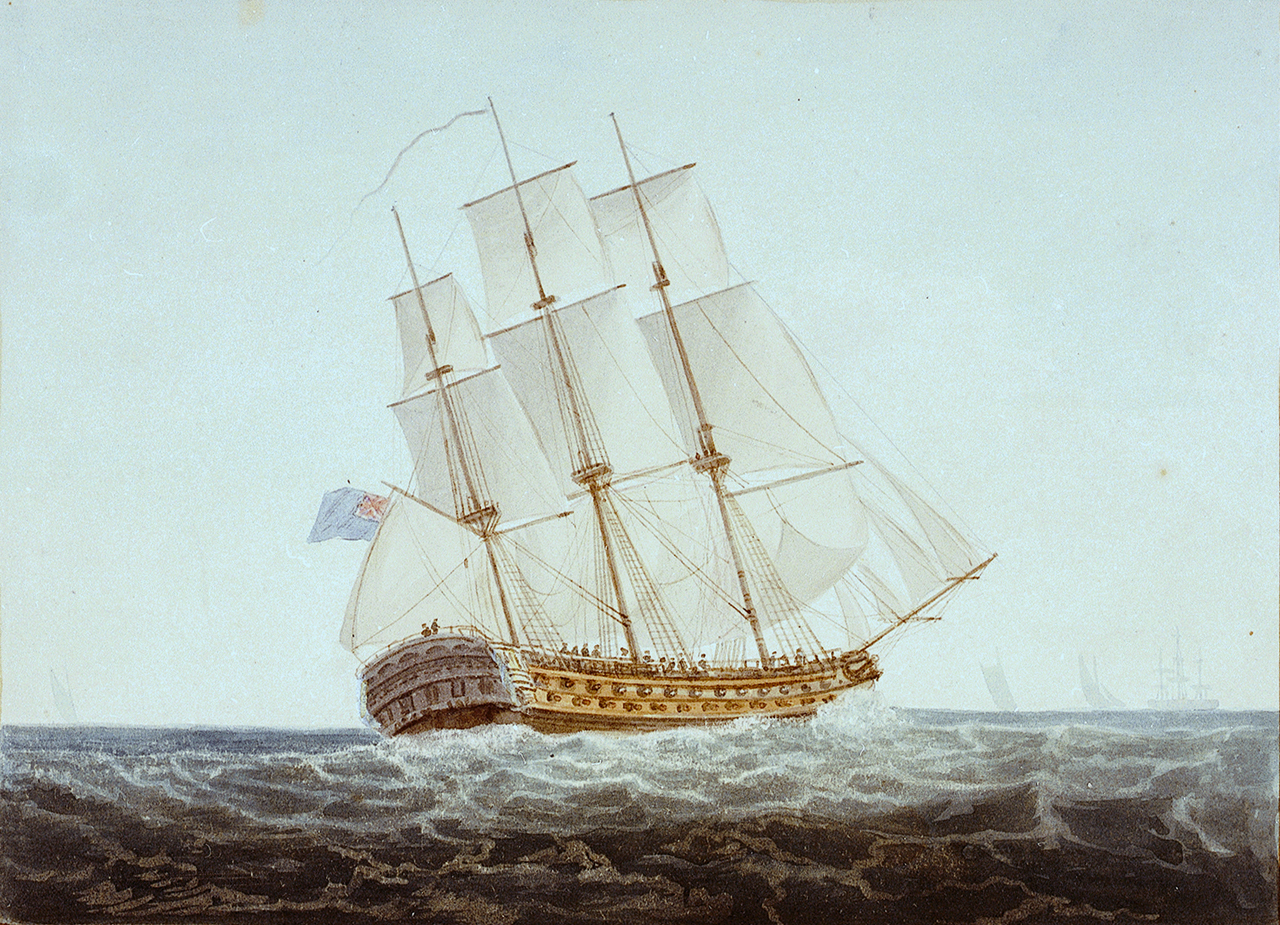
The third-rate HMS Ajax in which Cochrane saw action as a junior officer

Born the son of Admiral Sir Alexander Cochrane and Maria Cochrane (daughter of David Shaw and widow of Sir Jacob Wheate, 5th Baronet), Cochrane joined the Royal Navy in June 1796. He was appointed as a first class volunteer to the fifth-rate HMS Thetis on the North American Station and, having been promoted to midshipman, transferred to the third-rate HMS Ajax in the Channel Squadron early in 1800. In HMS Ajax, he saw action supporting French Royalist exiles at Quiberon in spring 1800, escorting troops for an abortive landing at Belle Île in May 1800 and taking part in the equally unsuccessful Ferrol Expedition in August 1800, before landing troops in Egypt in preparation for the more successful Battle of Alexandria in March 1801 during the French Revolutionary Wars.

Cochrane transferred to the third-rate HMS Northumberland, on the north coast of Spain, in early 1803 and, having been promoted to lieutenant on 14 June 1805, transferred to the fifth-rate HMS Jason in the West Indies, where his father was serving as Commander-in-Chief Leeward Islands. His rapid rise through the ranks clearly reflects his father's patronage.

Promoted to commander on 24 September 1805, he became commanding officer of the sloop HMS Nimrod in September 1805 and commanding officer of the fifth-rate HMS Jason in January 1806. In HMS Jason, having been promoted to captain on 23 April 1806. He captured the French ship Favourite off the coast of Dutch Guiana in January 1807 and then took part in the capture of the Virgin Islands from Danish forces in December 1807 during the Napoleonic Wars. He became commanding officer of the fifth-rate HMS Ethalion in October 1808 and took part in the capture of the French island of Martinique in February 1809 and of the French archipelago of Îles des Saintes in April 1809. He went on to command of the fifth-rate HMS Surprise on the North American Station in August 1812 and saw action capturing the American ship Decatur in January 1813, taking part in the burning of Washington in August 1814 and the attack on Baltimore in September 1814 and being deployed in operations off the coast of Georgia during the War of 1812. After that, he became commanding officer of the fifth-rate HMS Forte in June 1820.

== Colonial governor ==
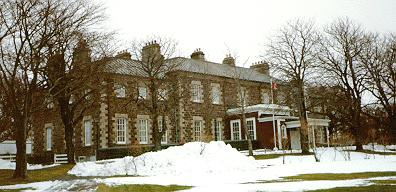
Government House in St. John's, Newfoundland and Labrador, built at Cochrane's instigation

When Newfoundland became an official Crown colony in 1825, Cochrane was appointed as its first governor. At the time, military officers were appointed to direct colonies that did not yet have representative government. He directed the construction of Government House, located between Fort William and Fort Townshend, which has since been designated as a National Historic Site of Canada. He split the colony into three judicial districts over each of which he placed a chief justice and two puisne judges and reinvigorated the poor relief system by building roads.

Although Cochrane had opposed the introduction of representative government to the colony, a new constitution was granted in 1832 and he was appointed as the first civil governor. He became involved in various conflicts while governor, especially with reformers in the new legislature and with the Roman Catholic bishop, Michael Fleming. In 1834, the colonial office recalled Cochrane, who had become unpopular. When he left, he and his daughter were pelted with filth on their way down to the wharf.

== Later career ==
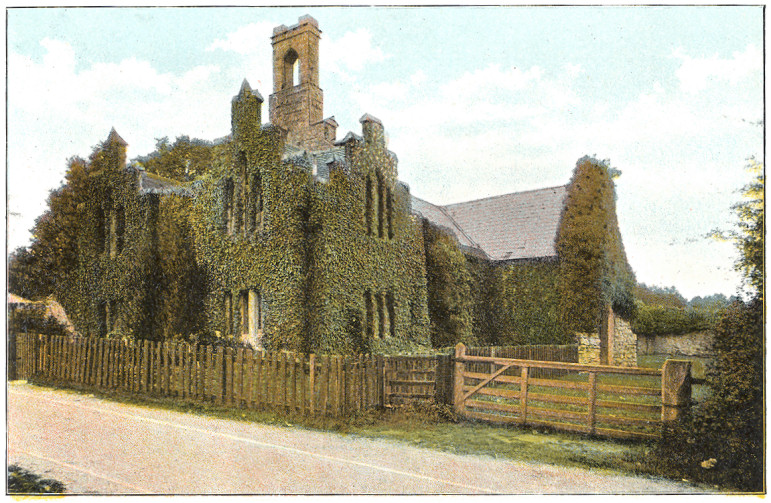
Quarr Abbey House, Cochrane's home

Cochrane was elected Member of Parliament for Ipswich in July 1839. He went on to be second-in-command of the East Indies and China Station in July 1841 during the First Opium War and, having been promoted to rear admiral on 23 November 1841, he became Commander-in-chief of that station, with his flag in the third-rate HMS Agincourt in 1844. He took part in anti-piracy operations around north-west Borneo including the destruction of the forts at Brunei in July 1846. He was promoted to vice admiral on 14 January 1850 and became Commander-in-Chief, Portsmouth in 1852. Promoted to full admiral on 31 January 1856, he was appointed Vice-Admiral of the United Kingdom on 16 May 1863 and then promoted to Admiral of the Fleet on 12 September 1865.

He was appointed a Companion of the Order of the Bath on 18 April 1839, advanced to Knight Commander on 29 October 1847, and finally to Knight Grand Cross on 18 May 1860.

Cochrane died at Quarr Abbey House on the Isle of Wight on 19 October 1872 and was buried in the family mausoleum at Kensal Green Cemetery in London. His wife died at Quarr Abbey House on 27 May 1901. She was also buried at Kensal Green Cemetery, interred in the mausoleum alongside her husband. Survivors present at her funeral included her brother Major Cuffe, her son Lieutenant Thomas Belhaven Henry Cochrane (deputy governor of the Isle of Wight), her husband's two daughters by his first marriage, and their daughter Minna Cochrane.

== Family ==
In January 1812, Cochrane married Matilda Lockhart-Ross, daughter of Lieutenant General Sir Charles Ross. They had two sons, including Alexander Dundas Ross Cochrane, and two daughters.

After the death of his first wife, he married Rosetta Wheler-Cuffe (daughter of Sir Jonah Denny Wheler-Cuffe, 1st Baronet) in January 1853; they had two sons (including Thomas Belhaven Henry Cochrane) and two daughters (including Dame Anne Cochrane).

== See also ==
- Governors of Newfoundland
- O'Byrne, William Richard (1849). "Cochrane, Thomas John" . A Naval Biographical Dictionary . John Murray – via Wikisource.

== Sources ==
- Heathcote, Tony (2002). The British Admirals of the Fleet 1734 – 1995. Pen & Sword. ISBN 0-85052-835-6.
- Mundy, R. (1848). Narrative of Events in Borneo & the Celebes. J. Murray. "mundy."

Political offices
Preceded by Sir Charles Hamilton	Governor of Newfoundland; 1825–1834	Succeeded by Sir Henry Prescott
Parliament of the United Kingdom
Preceded by Thomas Milner Gibson and Fitzroy Kelly	Member of Parliament for Ipswich; 1839–1841; With: Fitzroy Kelly	Succeeded by Rigby Wason and George Rennie
Preceded by Sir William Parker	Commander-in-Chief, East Indies and China Station; 1844–1846	Succeeded by Samuel Inglefield
Preceded by Sir Thomas Briggs	Commander-in-Chief, Portsmouth; 1852–1856	Succeeded by Sir George Seymour
Honorary titles
Preceded by Sir Francis Austen	Vice-Admiral of the United Kingdom; 1863–1865	Succeeded by Sir George Seymour
