= William Bickford Row =

English-Newfoundland politician and merchant (1786–1865)

William Bickford Row (October 3, 1786 – July 29, 1865) was an English-born Newfoundland merchant, lawyer and politician.

He was born in Torquay, Devon, the son of John Row. Row was involved in trade between England and Newfoundland as an agent for William Bickford until 1809 and then, in partnership with his brother, as an agent for John Hill and Company until that company became insolvent in 1811. In 1816, he set up his own store at St. John's but, by 1818, he had become the agent in Newfoundland for William Vallance of Devon.

In 1826, Row entered practice as a lawyer. In 1834, he became the first treasurer for the Law Society of Newfoundland. He ran unsuccessfully in 1832 for the St John's seat in the Legislative Assembly in the first general election held in Newfoundland. He was elected to represent Trinity in an 1834 by-election held after John Bingley Garland was named to the Executive Council. Row was reelected for Fortune Bay in 1836 and 1837. In 1841, he was named to the Executive Council. He resigned his seat in 1855 after the Council was made responsible to the legislative assembly.

After he retired from politics, Row returned to England and died at Taunton, Somerset in 1865.
