= John Valentine Nugent =

Newfoundland politician (1796–1874)

- Born: 1796; Waterford, Ireland
- Died: 12 June 1874 (aged 77–78); St. John's, Newfoundland and Labrador
- Occupations: Educator; journalist; politician
- Spouse: Ellen Maria Creedon

John Valentine Nugent (1796 – 12 June 1874) was an Irish-born educator, journalist and political figure in Newfoundland. He represented Placentia and St. Mary's from 1836 to 1842 and St. John's from 1842 to 1848 in the Newfoundland and Labrador House of Assembly. Nugent died in St. John's in 1874.

== Early life ==
He was born in Waterford, Ireland. Nugent married Ellen Maria Creedon. In 1833, he came to St. John's where he opened a private school, following an invite by Bishop Michael Anthony Fleming, who was responsible for much emigration to Newfoundland from the south east of Ireland. His mother who was ill, and his wife's sister Sister Marianne travelled with them to Newfoundland.

== Career ==
He was elected to the Newfoundland and Labrador House of Assembly in 1836 but the election results were declared invalid; he was elected again in 1837. Nugent served as solicitor for the Newfoundland Assembly. He became owner of the Newfoundland Patriot in 1837 after Robert John Parsons was sent to jail for contempt of court. In 1840, he became editor of the Newfoundland Vindicator and later of the Newfoundland Indicator. In 1844, he was named inspector of schools. Nugent helped found the St. John's Academy in 1845 and taught there from 1845 to 1856. He was defeated when he ran for reelection in 1848. He served as sheriff for the Central District from 1856 to 1871.
