= Peter Brown (Newfoundland politician) =

Newfoundland politician and merchant

Peter Brown (ca. 1797 – December 28, 1845 in Harbour Grace, Newfoundland) was a merchant, politician and justice of the peace was elected to the House of Assembly representing the district of Conception Bay on the first general election held in Newfoundland in 1832.

Brown, born in Ireland immigrated to Newfoundland where he was a dealer and shopkeeper in the Conception Bay area. He was a strong supporter of John Kent and remained in politics until 1842.

== See also ==
- List of people of Newfoundland and Labrador
