= James Power (politician) =

Newfoundland politician and businessman

James Power MHA

Member of the Newfoundland House of Assembly for Conception Bay
- In office 3 November 1832 – 1841
- Monarchs: William IV; Queen Victoria
- Preceded by: office established
- Succeeded by: Edmund Hanrahan

Personal details
- Born: James Power; 1796
- Died: 21 June 1847 (aged 50–51) Carbonear, Colony of Newfoundland
- Party: Liberal
- Occupation: Politician, Businessman, Justice of the Peace, Magistrate

James Power (c. 1796 – June 21, 1847 in Carbonear, Newfoundland) was a merchant, politician, justice of the peace and magistrate was elected to the House of Assembly representing the district of Conception Bay on the first general election held in Newfoundland in 1832.

== See also ==
- List of people of Newfoundland and Labrador
