= 1869 Newfoundland general election =

Election in the Colony of Newfoundland

- November 13, 1869

30 seats of the Newfoundland House of Assembly 16 seats needed for a majority
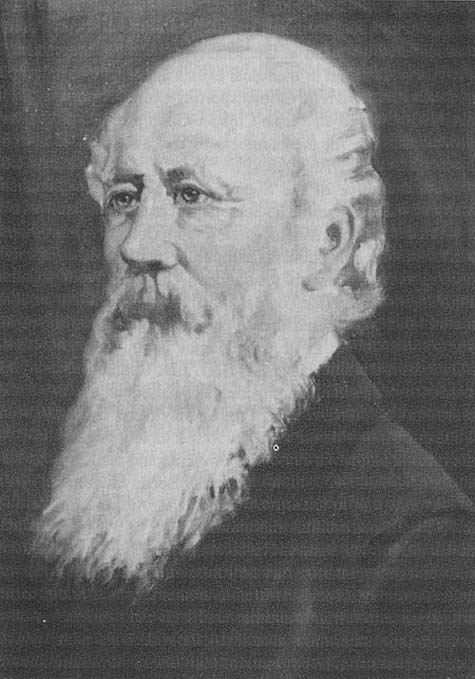

	First party	Second party
Leader	Charles Fox Bennett	Frederick Carter
Party	Anti-Confederation	Conservative
Leader since	1869	1865
Leader's seat	Placentia and St. Mary's (Note: Not the incumbent, but stood in this district and won.)	Burin
Last election	8 (Note: As the Opposition Party)	22
Seats won	21 (Note: This figure includes Henry Renouf's double election in the districts of Placentia and St. Mary's and St. John's West.)	9
Seat change	▲13	▼13
Popular vote	11,289 (Note: Note that this does not include the vote totals for the districts of Bay de Verde, Burin, Carbonear, Harbour Grace, and Trinity Bay, as the full results of those contests are not available.)	2,688
Percentage	80.77%	19.23%
Swing	▲36.19% (Note: Based on incomplete figures from the previous election)	▼36.19%
- Results by district
Premier before election
Frederick Carter
Conservative
Premier after election
Charles Fox Bennett
Anti-Confederation

The 1869 Newfoundland general election was held on November 13, 1869 to elect members of the 10th General Assembly of Newfoundland in the Newfoundland Colony. The Anti-Confederates led by Charles Fox Bennett formed the government.

The election was dominated by the issue of Newfoundland's potential union with the new Dominion of Canada. The incumbent Conservative coalition administration, led by Frederick Carter, supported Confederation. Terms of union were drafted by local confederates and they were passed after much debate within the Newfoundland House of Assembly. When the terms were ratified by the Canadian Parliament, Carter thought it best to put the decisive issue to a vote through a general election. Those opposed to Newfoundland's union with Canada coalesced under Bennett, a St. John's merchant who argued that Confederation would bring about increased taxation.

The Anti-Confederate campaign was vigorous and hard-fought. Bennett conducted a colony-wide tour across many outport communities, alleging that Newfoundlanders would be drafted into the Canadian Army if they voted for the incumbent government. By contrast, the Conservative opposition was unprepared to deal with the campaign, countering that Bennett was primarily concerned in protecting his personal interests rather than the well-being of the public. With the decisive Anti-Confederate victory, the Conservatives thereafter abandoned the issue of Confederation, and the debate was settled for the moment.

Henry Renouf ran in both St. John's West and Placentia and St. Mary's. After this election, no person ran in more than one seat until the 2025 Newfoundland and Labrador general election.

== Results ==
Party	Leader	1865	Candidates	Seats won	Seat change	% of seats (% change)	Popular vote	% of vote (% change)
Anti-Confederation	Charles Fox Bennett	8 (Note: As the Opposition Party)	28	21	▲13	70.00% (▲43.33%)	11,289	80.77% (▲36.19%)
Conservative (Confederation)	Frederick Carter	22	20	9	▼13	30.00% (▼43.33%)	2,688	19.23% (▼36.19%)
Totals		30	48	30	Steady	100%	13,977 (Note: Given that the majorities are known for the districts of Bay de Verde and Burin, it is evident that at least 14,414 votes were cast in this election.)	100%

== Results by district ==
- Names in **boldface type** represent party leaders.
- † indicates that the incumbent did not run again.
- ‡ indicates that the incumbent ran in a different district.

=== St. John's ===
Electoral district	Candidates		Incumbent
Electoral district	Conservative (historical)	Anti-Confederation	Incumbent
St. John's East	W. T. Parsons; 412; 9.45%	William Walsh; 1,327; 30.42%	John Kavanagh†
St. John's East	W. T. Parsons; 412; 9.45%	James Jordan; 1,325; 30.38%	John Kent†
St. John's East	W. T. Parsons; 412; 9.45%	Robert Parsons Sr. 1,298; 29.76%	Robert Parsons Sr.
St. John's West		Peter Brennan; Won by acclamation	Peter Brennan
St. John's West		Thomas Talbot; Won by acclamation	Thomas Talbot
St. John's West		Henry Renouf (Note: As Renouf had also been elected in the district of Placentia and St. Mary's, he chose to resign his seat in St. John's West, triggering a by-election.); Won by acclamation	Henry Renouf

=== Conception Bay ===
Electoral district	Candidates		Incumbent
Electoral district	Conservative (historical)	Anti-Confederation	Incumbent
Bay de Verde	John Bemister; Majority of 400 votes	Robert Reader; At least 29 votes	John Bemister
Carbonear (Note: Returns are not available for this district.)	John Rorke	Francis Taylor	John Rorke
Harbour Grace	John Munn	James Prendergast	Vacant (Note: John Hayward had been elected in 1865, but he resigned his office on August 7, 1868 to accept an appointment as an assistant judge in the Supreme Court of Newfoundland.)
Harbour Grace	William Green	Robert Dawe	William Green
Harbour Main		Joseph Little; Won by acclamation	Joseph Little
Harbour Main		John Kennedy; Won by acclamation	George Hogsett†
Port de Grave	Robert Pinsent; 101; 12.11%	James Woods; 733; 87.89%	Robert Pinsent

=== Avalon Peninsula ===
Electoral district	Candidates		Incumbent
Electoral district	Conservative (historical)	Anti-Confederation	Incumbent
Ferryland		Thomas Glen; Won by acclamation	Thomas Glen
Ferryland		Thomas Battcock; Won by acclamation	Michael Kearney†
Placentia and St. Mary's	Thomas O'Reilly; 103; 3.54%	**Charles Fox Bennett**; 882; 30.34%	Ambrose Shea
Placentia and St. Mary's	Ambrose Shea; 100; 3.44%	Henry Renouf; 872; 30.00%	Pierce Barron
Placentia and St. Mary's	Pierce Barron; 90; 3.10%	Robert Parsons Jr. 860; 29.58%	Thomas O'Reilly

=== Eastern and Central Newfoundland ===
Electoral district	Candidates		Incumbent
Electoral district	Conservative (historical)	Anti-Confederation	Incumbent
Bonavista Bay	John Warren; 539; 14.99%	James Noonan; 697; 19.39%	John Warren
Bonavista Bay	John Burton; 537; 14.94%	Francis Winton; 657; 18.28%	John Burton
Bonavista Bay	Michael Carroll; 515; 14.33%	William Barnes; 650; 18.08%	John Oakley†
Trinity Bay	Stephen Rendell	Robert Alsop; Won by 22 votes	Stephen Rendell
Trinity Bay	Thomas H. Ridley	Stephen March	Robert Alsop
Trinity Bay	Ellis Watson	Stephen March	Frederick Wyatt†
Twillingate and Fogo	William Whiteway; 208; 8.74%	Smith McKay; 1,063; 44.68%	William Whiteway
Twillingate and Fogo	Thomas Knight; 83; 3.49%	Charles Duder; 1,025; 43.09%	Thomas Knight

=== Southern Newfoundland ===
Electoral district	Candidates		Incumbent
Electoral district	Conservative (historical)	Anti-Confederation	Incumbent
Burgeo and LaPoile	Prescott Emerson; Won by acclamation		D. W. Prowse†
Burin (Note: Carter and Evans were initially declared the victors, but the results were challenged by LeMessurier and Woods. They charged that five voters from Frenchman's Cove had voted for Carter and Evans by proxy before changing their minds at the polling booth and declaring themselves for LeMessurier and Woods. These verbal votes were accepted by the returning officer at first, but they were later rejected, and Carter and Evans were returned for the district.)	**Frederick Carter**; Majority of 2 or 3 votes	Henry LeMessurier	**Frederick Carter**
Burin	Edward Evans; Majority of 2 or 3 votes	John Woods	Edward Evans
Fortune Bay		Thomas Bennett; Won by acclamation	Thomas Bennett
