= 1865 Newfoundland general election =

Election in the Colony of Newfoundland

- November 7, 1865

30 seats of the Newfoundland House of Assembly 16 seats needed for a majority
| | First party | Second party |
|---|---|---|
| | | Opp. |
| Leader | Frederick Carter | Thomas Glen |
| Party | Conservative | Opposition |
| Leader since | 1865 | 1865 |
| Leader's seat | Burin (Note: Not the incumbent, but stood in this district and won.) | Ferryland |
| Last election | 16 (Note: This figure includes the subsequent by-election for Harbour Grace as that district did not initially submit returns due to sectarian violence.) | 14 |
| Seats won | 22 | 8 |
| Seat change | ▲6 | ▼6 |
| Popular vote | 10,187 | 7,008 |
| Percentage | 59.24% | 40.76% |
| Swing | ▲57.74% | ▼51.76% |
- Results by district
Premier before election
Frederick Carter
Conservative
Premier after election
Frederick Carter
Conservative

The 1865 Newfoundland general election was held on November 7, 1865 to elect members of the 9th General Assembly of Newfoundland in the Newfoundland Colony. The Conservative Party led by Frederick Carter formed the government. Following the resignation of premier Hugh Hoyles, Carter took office and successfully negotiated a coalition government with several members of the Liberal Party, including leader of the opposition Ambrose Shea. Carter and Shea both endorsed Newfoundland's Confederation with Canada following their attendance as observers of the 1864 Quebec Conference. The opposition to the Carter-Shea coalition was disorganized and loosely led by former Receiver General Thomas Glen.

== Results ==
| Party | Leader | 1861 | Candidates | Seats won | Seat change | % of seats (% change) | Popular vote | % of vote (% change) |
|---|---|---|---|---|---|---|---|---|
| Conservative (Coalition) | Frederick Carter | 16 | 22 | 22 | ▲6 | 73.33% (▲20.00%) | 10,187 | 59.24% (▲57.74%) |
| Opposition | Thomas Glen | 14 (Note: As the Liberal Party) | 20 | 8 | ▼6 | 26.67% (▼20.00%) | 7,008 | 40.76% (▼51.76%) |
| Totals | | 30 | 42 | 30 | Steady | 100% | 17,195 | 100% |

== Results by district ==
- Names in **boldface type** represent party leaders.
- † indicates that the incumbent did not run again.
- ‡ indicates that the incumbent ran in a different district.

=== St. John's ===
| Electoral district | Candidates | | Incumbent |
| Electoral district | Conservative (historical) | Liberal (historical) | Incumbent |
|---|---|---|---|
| St. John's East | John Kent; 1,310; 29.00% | John Kavanagh; 1,409; 31.19% | John Kavanagh |
| St. John's East | John Kent; 1,310; 29.00% | Robert Parsons; 1,283; 28.40% | Robert Parsons |
| St. John's East | John Kent; 1,310; 29.00% | Michael Power; 515; 11.40% | John Kent |
| St. John's West | John Casey; Won by acclamation | Thomas Talbot; Won by acclamation | John Casey |
| St. John's West | John Casey; Won by acclamation | Henry Renouf; Won by acclamation | Thomas Talbot |
| St. John's West | John Casey; Won by acclamation | Henry Renouf; Won by acclamation | Henry Renouf |

=== Conception Bay ===
| Electoral district | Candidates | | | Incumbent |
| Electoral district | Conservative (historical) | Liberal (historical) | Other | Incumbent |
|---|---|---|---|---|
| Bay de Verde | John Bemister; Won by acclamation | | | John Bemister |
| Carbonear | John Rorke; Won by acclamation | | | John Rorke |
| Harbour Grace | John Hayward; 961; 44.95% | James Prendergast; 295; 13.80% | | John Hayward |
| Harbour Grace | William Green; 882; 41.25% | James Prendergast; 295; 13.80% | | Henry Moore† |
| Harbour Main | | George Hogsett; 476; 33.03% | Patrick Nowlan (Independent Opposition) (Note: Nowlan and Ezekiel were also considered members of the opposition party rather than allies of Carter's government.); 274; 19.01% | Thomas Byrne† |
| Harbour Main | | Charles Furey; 476; 33.03% | ? Ezekiel (Independent Opposition); 215; 14.92% | Patrick Nowlan |
| Port de Grave | John Leamon; Won by acclamation | | | John Leamon |

=== Avalon Peninsula ===
| Electoral district | Candidates | | Incumbent |
| Electoral district | Conservative (historical) | Liberal (historical) | Incumbent |
|---|---|---|---|
| Ferryland | | **Thomas Glen**; Won by acclamation | Edward Shea† |
| Ferryland | | Michael Kearney; Won by acclamation | **Thomas Glen** |
| Placentia and St. Mary's | Ambrose Shea; 628; 27.99% | James Croucher; 385; 17.16% | Ambrose Shea |
| Placentia and St. Mary's | Pierce Barron; 562; 25.04% | ? English; 216; 9.63% | Pierce Barron |
| Placentia and St. Mary's | Thomas O'Reilly; 453; 20.19% | ? English; 216; 9.63% | Richard McGrath† |

=== Eastern and Central Newfoundland ===
| Electoral district | Candidates | | Incumbent |
| Electoral district | Conservative (historical) | Liberal (historical) | Incumbent |
|---|---|---|---|
| Bonavista Bay | John Warren; 412; 28.51% | Archibald Emerson; 283; 19.58% | John Warren |
| Bonavista Bay | John Oakley; 398; 27.54% | Archibald Emerson; 283; 19.58% | Frederick J. Wyatt‡ (ran in Trinity Bay) |
| Bonavista Bay | John Burton; 352; 24.36% | Archibald Emerson; 283; 19.58% | Stephen March‡ (ran in Trinity Bay) |
| Trinity Bay | Stephen Rendell; 788; 28.38% | James Verge; 315; 11.34% | Stephen Rendell |
| Trinity Bay | Frederick Wyatt; 755; 27.19% | Jabez Tilley; 207; 7.45% | **Frederick Carter**‡ (ran in Burin) |
| Trinity Bay | Stephen March; 712; 25.64% | Jabez Tilley; 207; 7.45% | John Winter† |
| Twillingate and Fogo | Thomas Knight; 558; 36.66% | John Mortimer; 392; 25.76% | William Whiteway |
| Twillingate and Fogo | William Whiteway; 512; 33.64% | William Boag; ~60; ~3.94% | Thomas Knight |

=== Southern Newfoundland ===
| Electoral district | Candidates | | Incumbent |
| Electoral district | Conservative (historical) | Liberal (historical) | Incumbent |
|---|---|---|---|
| Burgeo and LaPoile | D. W. Prowse; Won by acclamation | | D. W. Prowse |
| Burin | Edward Evans; 458; 41.22% | Patrick Morris; 207; 18.63% | Edward Evans |
| Burin | **Frederick Carter**; 446; 40.14% | Patrick Morris; 207; 18.63% | Hugh Hoyles† |
| Fortune Bay | Thomas Bennett; Won by acclamation | | Robert Carter† |
