= 9th General Assembly of Newfoundland =

Colony of Newfoundland legislature

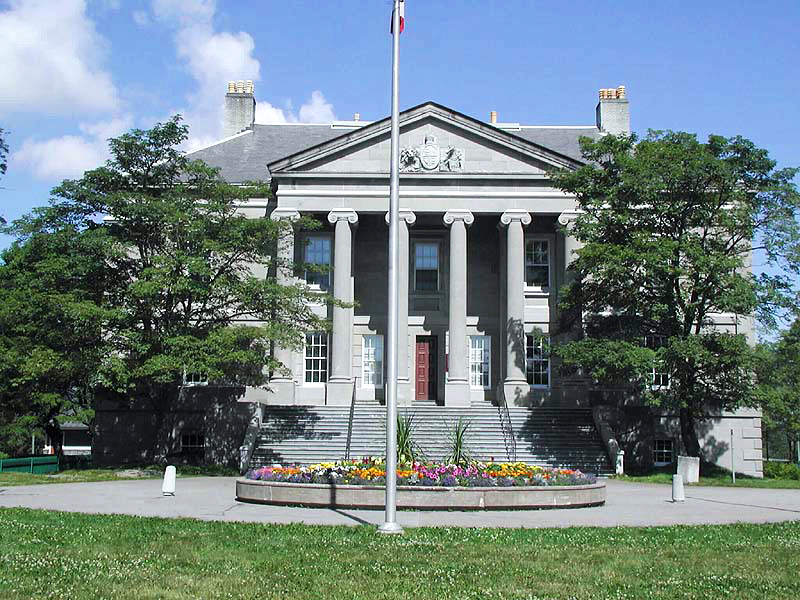
- Colonial Building seat of the Newfoundland government and the House of Assembly from January 28, 1850, to July 28, 1959.

History
- Founded: 1866
- Disbanded: 1869
- Preceded by: 8th General Assembly of Newfoundland
- Succeeded by: 10th General Assembly of Newfoundland

Leadership
- Premier: Frederick Carter

Elections
- Last election: 1865 Newfoundland general election

The members of the 9th General Assembly of Newfoundland were elected in the Newfoundland general election held in November 1865. The general assembly sat from 1866 to 1869.

A coalition government led by Frederick Carter won the election and Carter served as Newfoundland's premier. Not all members of the coalition supported Canadian Confederation.

William Whiteway was chosen as speaker.

Sir Anthony Musgrave served as colonial governor of Newfoundland.

In 1869, draft terms for union of Newfoundland with Canada were presented to and accepted by the Canadian parliament. Premier Carter did not feel that he had a mandate to enter Confederation and called an election to allow the issue to be decided by the electorate.

== Members of the Assembly ==
The following members were elected to the assembly in 1865:

Member	Electoral district	Affiliation	First elected / previously elected
John Bemister	Bay de Verde	Coalition	1855
John Henry Warren	Bonavista Bay	Coalition	1852
John T. Oakley	Bonavista Bay	Coalition	1865
John T. Burton	Bonavista Bay	Coalition	1865
Daniel W. Prowse	Burgeo-La Poile	Coalition	1861
Frederick Carter	Burin	Coalition	1859
Edward Evans	Burin	Coalition	1861
John Rorke	Carbonear	Coalition	1863
Thomas Glen	Ferryland	Opposition	1855
Michael Kearney	Ferryland	Opposition	1865
Thomas R. Bennett	Fortune Bay	Coalition	1865
John Hayward	Harbour Grace (Note: No result; by-election held November 1861)	Coalition	1855
William S. Green	Harbour Grace	Coalition	1865
Joseph Godden (1868)	Harbour Grace	Coalition	1868
George Hogsett	Harbour Main (Note: Invalid return; result decided by assembly committee)	Opposition	1865
Charles Furey	Harbour Main	Opposition	1859, 1865
Joseph I. Little (1867)	Harbour Main	Opposition	1867
Ambrose Shea	Placentia and St. Mary's	Coalition	1848
Pierce M. Barron	Placentia and St. Mary's	Coalition	1859, (Note: St. John's West) 1861
Thomas O'Reilly	Placentia and St. Mary's	Coalition	1865
John Leamon	Port de Grave	Coalition	1859
Robert John Pinsent (1867)	Port de Grave	Coalition	1867
John Kent	St. John's East	Coalition	1832, 1848
Robert John Parsons	St. John's East	Opposition	1843
John Kavanagh (Note: Joined the coalition in 1868)	St. John's East	Opposition	1857
John Kavanagh	St. John's East	Coalition	1857
John Casey	St. John's West	Coalition	1859
Thomas Talbot	St. John's West	Opposition	1861
Henry Renouf	St. John's West	Opposition	1861
Peter Brennan (1866)	St. John's West	Opposition	1866
Stephen Rendell	Trinity Bay	Coalition	1859
Frederick J. Wyatt	Trinity Bay	Coalition	1864
Stephen March	Trinity Bay	Coalition	1852
Robert Alsop (1866)	Trinity Bay	Coalition	1866
William Whiteway	Twillingate and Fogo	Coalition	1859
Thomas Knight	Twillingate and Fogo	Coalition	1859

== By-elections ==
By-elections were held to replace members for various reasons:

Electoral district	Member elected	Affiliation	Election date	Reason
St. John's West	Peter Brennan	Opposition	June 2, 1866	J Casey named to cabinet in 1866 (Note: After 1862, new appointees to cabinet were required to resign and seek a vote of confidence from their electors)
Trinity Bay	Robert Alsop	Coalition	October 29, 1866	S March resigned seat in 1866
Port de Grave	Robert John Pinsent	Coalition	January 14, 1867	J Leamon died in 1866
Harbour Main	Joseph I. Little	Opposition	November 28, 1867	C Furey vacated seat in 1867
Harbour Grace	Joseph Godden	Coalition	November 7, 1868	J Hayward named judge on August 7, 1868
