= 8th General Assembly of Newfoundland =

Colony of Newfoundland legislature

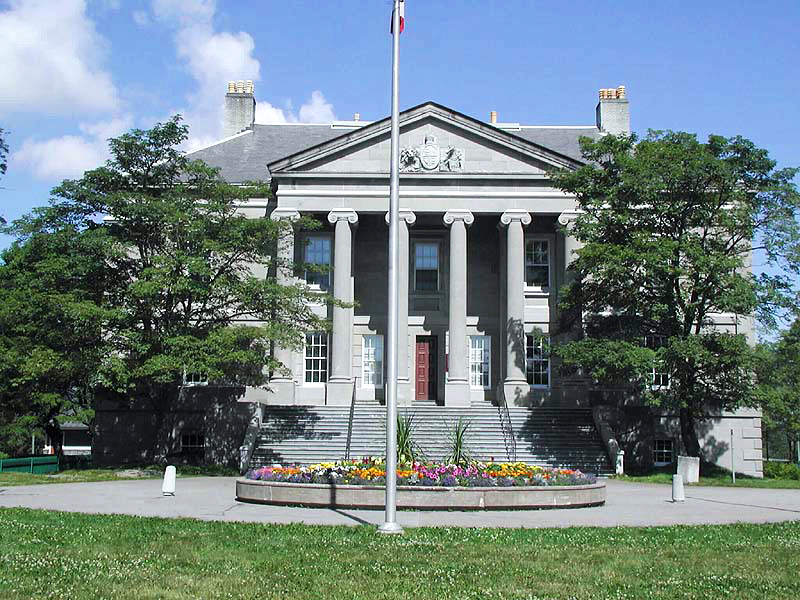
- Colonial Building seat of the Newfoundland government and the House of Assembly from January 28, 1850, to July 28, 1959.

History
- Founded: 1861
- Disbanded: 1865
- Preceded by: 7th General Assembly of Newfoundland
- Succeeded by: 9th General Assembly of Newfoundland

Leadership
- Premier: Hugh Hoyles
- Premier: Frederick Carter since 1865

Elections
- Last election: 1861 Newfoundland general election

The members of the 8th General Assembly of Newfoundland were elected in the Newfoundland general election held in May 1861. The general assembly sat from 1861 to 1865. At this time Newfoundland was a British colony unto itself.

Hugh Hoyles, leader of the Conservative Party, had been appointed premier and invited to form a government in March after his predecessor was dismissed by the governor. Hoyles' government was defeated in a non-confidence vote prompting a general election in May, which Hoyles narrowly won eventually.

The election was marred by lethal shootings both before and after the election. It was fought along sectarian lines with Catholics largely voting Liberal and Protestants largely voting Conservative.

As well, Liberals were divided, at least in the district of Harbour Main. When supporters of Liberal candidates Fury and Hogsett tried to vote, they were beset upon by supporters of the other two candidates, Byrne and Nowlan, who were also Liberals. Shooting broke out - one killed, several wounded - but the Fury-Hogsett voters did cast their votes. The result was so close and tempers so high that the returning officer issued two results—one with Fury and Hogsett the winners and one with Byrne and Nowlan the winners.

Hoyles and the Protestant Conservative Party of Newfoundland initially were awarded 14 seats to the 12 seats held by Kent's Liberals, but the result was contentious because four seats were not yet placed.

Protests and rioting ensued such as the May 13 "St. John's Election riot", in which 2,000 protesters gathered outside the Colonial Building in St. John’s and then rioted across the city. Armed soldiers killed three and wounded twenty before the local bishop called on the crowd to disperse.

The decision in Harbour Main went to adjudication, which resulted in the two seats being given to Nowlan and Byrne. That decision produced a tie—Conservatives' 14 seats to Liberals' 14 seats, with only the seats in Harbour Grace left to decide the majority. For that by-election, troops were stationed in the district on election day and it went off peacefully. The by-election returned two Conservatives and gave Hoyles a majority.

Hoyles then continued as Newfoundland's premier until March 1865. In 1865 he resigned and accepted a post on the Newfoundland Supreme Court.

Frederick Carter succeeded Hoyles as party leader and premier. Carter formed a coalition government with Liberals Ambrose Shea and John Kent.

Frederick Carter was chosen as speaker, serving until April 1865, when William Whiteway became speaker.

Sir Alexander Bannerman served as colonial governor of Newfoundland until 1864. Sir Anthony Musgrave succeeded Bannerman as governor.

Frederick Carter and Ambrose Shea represented Newfoundland at the 1864 Quebec Conference on Canadian Confederation.

== Members of the Assembly ==
The following members were elected to the assembly in 1861:

Member	Electoral district	Affiliation	First elected / previously elected
John Bemister	Bay de Verde	Conservative	1852
Stephen March	Bonavista Bay	Conservative	1852
John Henry Warren	Bonavista Bay	Conservative	1852
Matthew W. Walbank	Bonavista Bay	Conservative	1855
Frederick J. Wyatt (1864)	Bonavista Bay	Conservative	1864
Daniel W. Prowse	Burgeo-La Poile	Conservative	1861
Edward Evans	Burin	Conservative	1861
Hugh Hoyles	Burin	Conservative	1848, (Note: Fortune Bay) 1860
Edmund Hanrahan	Carbonear	Liberal	1855
John Rorke (1863)	Carbonear	Conservative	1863
Thomas Glen	Ferryland	Liberal	1855
Edward Dalton Shea	Ferryland	Liberal	1855
Robert Carter	Fortune Bay	Conservative	1859
John Hayward	Harbour Grace (Note: No result; by-election held November 1861)	Liberal	1855
Henry J. Moore	Harbour Grace	Liberal	1861
Thomas Byrne	Harbour Main (Note: Invalid return; result decided by assembly committee)	Liberal	1855, 1861
Patrick Nowlan	Harbour Main	Liberal	1859
Ambrose Shea	Placentia and St. Mary's	Liberal	1848
W. G. Flood	Placentia and St. Mary's	Liberal	1861
Richard McGrath	Placentia and St. Mary's	Liberal	1860
Pierce M. Barron (1861)	Placentia and St. Mary's	Liberal	1859, (Note: St. John's West) 1861
John Leamon	Port de Grave	Conservative	1859
John Kent	St. John's East	Liberal	1832, 1848
Robert John Parsons	St. John's East	Liberal	1843
John Kavanagh	St. John's East	Liberal	1857
John Casey	St. John's West	Liberal	1859
Thomas Talbot	St. John's West	Liberal	1861
Henry Renouf	St. John's West	Liberal	1861
Stephen Rendell	Trinity Bay	Conservative	1859
John Winter	Trinity Bay	Conservative	1859
F.B.T. Carter	Trinity Bay	Conservative	1859
William Whiteway	Twillingate and Fogo	Conservative	1859
Thomas Knight	Twillingate and Fogo	Conservative	1859

== By-elections ==
By-elections were held to replace members for various reasons:

Electoral district	Member elected	Affiliation	Election date	Reason
Placentia and St. Mary's	Pierce M. Barron	Liberal	1861	W G Flood resigned seat in 1861
Carbonear	John Rorke	Conservative	1863	E Hanrahan resigned seat in 1863
Bonavista Bay	Frederick J. Wyatt	Conservative	1864	M W Walbank resigned seat in 1864
