= 1861 Newfoundland general election =

Election in the Colony of Newfoundland

- May 2, 1861

30 seats of the Newfoundland House of Assembly 16 seats needed for a majority
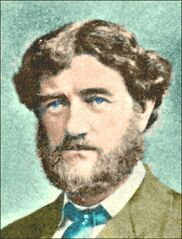

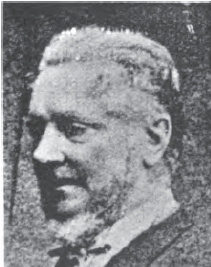
	First party	Second party
Leader	Hugh Hoyles	John Kent
Party	Conservative	Liberal
Leader since	1855	1858
Leader's seat	Burin (Note: Not the incumbent, but stood in this district and won.)	St. John's East
Last election	12	18
Seats won	16 (Note: This figure includes the subsequent by-election for Harbour Grace as that district did not initially submit returns due to sectarian violence.)	14
Seat change	▲4	▼4
Popular vote	84 (Note: The entirety of the Conservative caucus were elected by acclamation. As a consequence of this, the only votes that the government received in this election were through an unsuccessful candidate in the district of Ferryland.)	5,184
Percentage	1.50%	92.52%
Swing	▼28.65%	▲22.67%
- Results by district
Premier before election
Hugh Hoyles
Conservative
Premier after election
Hugh Hoyles
Conservative

The 1861 Newfoundland general election was held on May 2, 1861 to elect the members of the 8th General Assembly of Newfoundland in the Newfoundland Colony. It was triggered following the forced resignation of Premier John Kent by Governor Alexander Bannerman after Kent accused Bannerman of colluding with the Conservative Party. Bannerman had appointed Conservative leader Hugh Hoyles as the new Premier, but Kent quickly passed a motion of non-confidence against Hoyles' administration, forcing Bannerman to call an election.

The election was fraught with sectarian tensions. Most districts went uncontested for fear of violence. A riot broke out in St. John's. Riots prevented an election from occurring in the district of Harbour Grace. A violent confrontation broke out in Salmon Cove within the Harbour Main district, killing one man and injuring nine others, and the returns for that district were subsequently invalidated by the House of Assembly. A political deadlock ensued, and no party controlled the legislature until a by-election held in Harbour Grace in November 1861 finally gave Hoyles' Conservatives a majority government. Ambrose Shea subsequently became the leader of the Liberal Party.

== Results ==
Party	Leader	1859	Candidates	Seats won	Seat change	% of seats (% change)	Popular vote	% of vote (% change)
Conservative	Hugh Hoyles	12	15	16	▲4	53.33% (▲13.33%)	84	1.50% (▼28.65%)
Liberal	John Kent	18	18	14	▼4	46.67% (▼13.33%)	5,184 (Note: If the 1,273 votes cast for the four Liberal candidates in Harbour Main are counted, then the opposition under Kent received a total of 6,457 votes.)	92.52% (▲22.67%)
Other		0	1	0	Steady	0.00%	335	5.98% (▲5.98%)
Totals		30	34	30	Steady	100%	5,603 (Note: Including the invalidated results from the district of Harbour Main, a total of 6,876 votes were cast in this election.)	100%

== Results by district ==
- Names in **boldface type** represent party leaders.
- † indicates that the incumbent did not run again.
- ‡ indicates that the incumbent ran in a different district.
- $ indicates that the incumbent was initially nominated for re-election, but they later chose to withdraw from the race.

=== St. John's ===
Electoral district	Candidates		Incumbent
Electoral district	Liberal (historical)	Other	Incumbent
St. John's East	John Kavanagh; 1,489; 33.70%	Samuel Archibald (Independent); 335; 7.58%	**John Kent**
St. John's East	Robert Parsons; 1,309; 29.62%	Samuel Archibald (Independent); 335; 7.58%	John Kavanagh
St. John's East	**John Kent**; 1,286; 29.10%	Samuel Archibald (Independent); 335; 7.58%	Robert Parsons
St. John's West (Note: Kenneth McLea initially ran as a Conservative candidate, but he withdrew prior to election day following mob violence against his business premises.)	John Casey; Won by acclamation		John Casey
St. John's West	Thomas Talbot; Won by acclamation		Thomas Dwyer†
St. John's West	Henry Renouf; Won by acclamation		Pierce Barron$

=== Conception Bay ===
Electoral district	Candidates			Incumbent
Electoral district	Conservative (historical)	Liberal (historical)	Other	Incumbent
Bay de Verde	John Bemister; Won by acclamation			John Bemister
Carbonear	(Note: W. P. Taylor initially ran as a Conservative candidate, but he withdrew prior to election day following mob violence against some of his relatives.)	Edmund Hanrahan; Won by acclamation		Edmund Hanrahan
Harbour Grace (Note: Although Moore would withdraw prior to election day, no return was declared by the returning officer, and the House of Assembly later also determined that nobody had been elected in the district of Harbour Grace. A by-election was held in November 1861 which saw Hayward and Moore elected, both of whom were running as Conservatives.)	(Note: Henry Moore initially ran as a Conservative candidate, but he withdrew prior to election day following a series of riots in Harbour Grace where property belonging to his and Hayward's supporters were damaged by a group of 400 Roman Catholics from Carbonear.)	John Hayward; No returns declared		John Hayward
Harbour Grace	(Note: Henry Moore initially ran as a Conservative candidate, but he withdrew prior to election day following a series of riots in Harbour Grace where property belonging to his and Hayward's supporters were damaged by a group of 400 Roman Catholics from Carbonear.)	James Prendergast; No returns declared		James Prendergast
Harbour Main (Note: Following the violence in Salmon Cove, the 36 voters from Cat's Cove illegally cast their ballots for Furey and Hogsett in Harbour Main. Under pressure from Furey and Hogsett's outraged voters, the returning officer, Patrick Strapp, issued a return declaring them to have been elected, but it was declared invalid by the House of Assembly. After further violence in St. John's, a select committee decreed that Nowlan and Byrne had been elected. The results of the election without the illegal votes in Harbour Main are shown here in italics.)		George Hogsett; 316; 24.82%	Patrick Nowlan (Independent Liberal) (Note: Furey and Hogsett had been endorsed by the Roman Catholic clergy of Harbour Main as well as by John Dalton, the Catholic Bishop of Harbour Grace. Byrne and Nowlan ran on a separate ticket without the support of the aforementioned clergy.); 325; 25.53%	Patrick Nowlan
Harbour Main		Charles Furey; 310; 24.35%	Thomas Byrne (Independent Liberal); 322; 25.29%	Charles Furey
Port de Grave	John Leamon; Won by acclamation			John Leamon

=== Avalon Peninsula ===
Electoral district	Candidates		Incumbent
Electoral district	Conservative (historical)	Liberal (historical)	Incumbent
Ferryland	John White; 84; 7.09%	Edward Shea; 571; 48.23%	Thomas Glen
Ferryland	John White; 84; 7.09%	Thomas Glen; 529; 44.68%	Edward Shea
Placentia and St. Mary's		Ambrose Shea; Won by acclamation	George Hogsett‡ (ran in Harbour Main)
Placentia and St. Mary's		W. G. Flood; Won by acclamation	John English†
Placentia and St. Mary's		Richard McGrath; Won by acclamation	Richard McGrath

=== Eastern and Central Newfoundland ===
Electoral district	Candidates	Incumbent
Electoral district	Conservative (historical)	Incumbent
Bonavista Bay	Stephen March; Won by acclamation	Stephen March
Bonavista Bay	John Warren; Won by acclamation	John Warren
Bonavista Bay	Matthew Walbank; Won by acclamation	Matthew Walbank
Trinity Bay	Stephen Rendell; Won by acclamation	Stephen Rendell
Trinity Bay	John Winter; Won by acclamation	John Winter
Trinity Bay	Frederick Carter; Won by acclamation	Frederick Carter
Twillingate and Fogo	William Whiteway; Won by acclamation	William Whiteway
Twillingate and Fogo	Thomas Knight; Won by acclamation	Thomas Knight

=== Southern Newfoundland ===
Electoral district	Candidates	Incumbent
Electoral district	Conservative (historical)	Incumbent
Burgeo and LaPoile	D. W. Prowse; Won by acclamation	**Hugh Hoyles**‡ (ran in Burin)
Burin	Edward Evans; Won by acclamation	Ambrose Shea‡ (ran in Placentia and St. Mary's)
Burin	**Hugh Hoyles**; Won by acclamation	James Rogerson†
Fortune Bay	Robert Carter; Won by acclamation	Robert Carter
