= 7th General Assembly of Newfoundland =

Colony of Newfoundland legislature

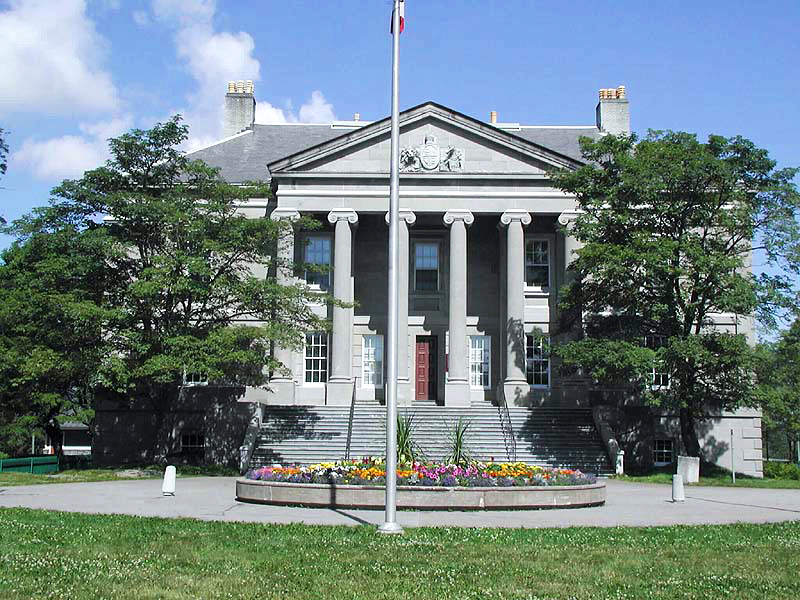

History
- Founded: 1860
- Disbanded: 1861
- Preceded by: 6th General Assembly of Newfoundland
- Succeeded by: 8th General Assembly of Newfoundland

Leadership
- John Kent

Elections
- Last election: 1859 Newfoundland general election

The members of the 7th General Assembly of Newfoundland were elected in the Newfoundland general election held in November 1859. The general assembly sat from 1860 to 1861.

The Liberal Party led by John Kent won the election and Kent served as Newfoundland's premier.

Ambrose Shea was chosen as speaker until 1861, when Frederick Carter briefly served as speaker.

Sir Alexander Bannerman served as colonial governor of Newfoundland.

In February 1861, Premier Kent accused Governor Bannerman of conspiring with the Conservatives and the judiciary to defeat a bill that would have changed the rate of exchange for the dollar. Bannerman dismissed Kent's government and invited the Conservative leader Hugh Hoyles to form a government. That government subsequently was defeated by a vote of no confidence and a general election was held.

== Members of the Assembly ==
The following members were elected to the assembly in 1859:

Member	Electoral district	Affiliation	First elected / previously elected
John Bemister	Bay de Verde	Conservative	1852
Stephen March	Bonavista Bay	Conservative	1852
John Henry Warren	Bonavista Bay	Conservative	1852
Matthew W. Walbank	Bonavista Bay	Conservative	1855
James Seaton	Burgeo-La Poile	Conservative	1859
Hugh Hoyles (1860)	Burgeo-La Poile	Conservative	1848, (Note: Fortune Bay) 1860
James Johnstone Rogerson	Burin	Liberal	1859
Ambrose Shea	Burin	Liberal	1848
Edmund Hanrahan	Carbonear	Liberal	1855
Thomas Glen	Ferryland	Liberal	1855
Edward Dalton Shea	Ferryland	Liberal	1855
Robert Carter	Fortune Bay	Conservative	1859
James Luke Prendergast	Harbour Grace	Liberal	1842, 1855, 1860
John Hayward	Harbour Grace	Liberal	1855
Patrick Nowlan	Harbour Main	Liberal	1859
Charles Furey	Harbour Main	Liberal	1859
George James Hogsett	Placentia and St. Mary's	Liberal	1852
J. W. English	Placentia and St. Mary's	Liberal	1859
John Delaney	Placentia and St. Mary's	Liberal	1848, 1855
Richard McGrath (1860)	Placentia and St. Mary's	Liberal	1860
John Leamon	Port de Grave	Conservative	1859
John Kent	St. John's East	Liberal	1832, 1848
John Kavanagh	St. John's East	Liberal	1857
Robert John Parsons	St. John's East	Liberal	1843
Pierce Barron	St. John's West	Liberal	1859
John Casey	St. John's West	Liberal	1859
Thomas S. Dwyer	St. John's West	Liberal	1859
Stephen Rendell	Trinity Bay	Conservative	1859
John Winter	Trinity Bay	Conservative	1859
F.B.T. Carter	Trinity Bay	Conservative	1859
William Whiteway	Twillingate and Fogo	Conservative	1858
Thomas Knight	Twillingate and Fogo	Conservative	1859

== By-elections ==
By-elections were held to replace members for various reasons:

Electoral district	Member elected	Affiliation	Election date	Reason
Harbour Grace	James Luke Prendergast	Liberal	November 1860	Election of JL Prendergast declared invalid
Burgeo-La Poile	Hugh Hoyles	Conservative	1860	J Seaton resigned seat
Placentia and St. Mary's	Richard McGrath	Liberal	1860	J Delaney named Postmaster General
