= 10th General Assembly of Newfoundland =

Colony of Newfoundland legislature

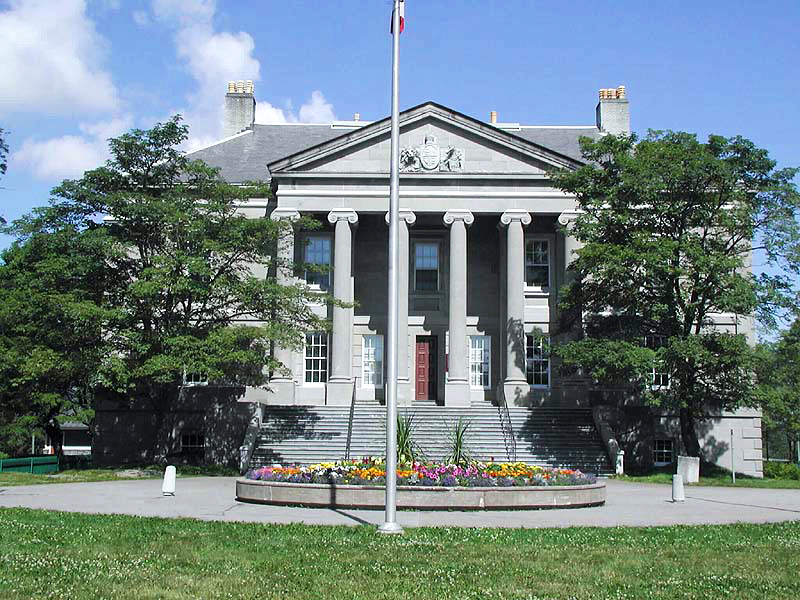
- Colonial Building seat of the Newfoundland government and the House of Assembly from January 28, 1850, to July 28, 1959.

History
- Founded: 1870
- Disbanded: 1873
- Preceded by: 9th General Assembly of Newfoundland
- Succeeded by: 11th General Assembly of Newfoundland

Leadership
- Premier: Charles Fox Bennett

Elections
- Last election: 1869 Newfoundland general election

The members of the 10th General Assembly of Newfoundland were elected in the Newfoundland general election held in November 1869. The general assembly sat from 1870 to 1873.

The Anti-Confederation Party led by Charles Fox Bennett won the election and Bennett served as Newfoundland's premier. The decisive defeat of candidates supporting Confederation put an end to any discussions about union with Canada.

Thomas R. Bennett was chosen as speaker.

Sir Stephen John Hill served as colonial governor of Newfoundland.

== Members of the Assembly ==
The following members were elected to the assembly in 1869:

Member	Electoral district	Affiliation	First elected / previously elected
John Bemister	Bay de Verde	Confederate	1855
James J. Rogerson (1870)	Bay de Verde	Confederate	1870
James L. Noonan	Bonavista Bay	Anti-Confederate	1869
William M. Barnes	Bonavista Bay	Anti-Confederate	1869
Francis Winton	Bonavista Bay	Anti-Confederate	1869
Prescott Emerson	Burgeo-La Poile	Confederate	1869
Edward Evans	Burin	Confederate	1861
Frederick Carter	Burin	Confederate	1859
John Rorke	Carbonear	Confederate	1863
Thomas Glen	Ferryland	Anti-Confederate	1855
Thomas Badcock	Ferryland	Anti-Confederate	1869
Thomas R. Bennett	Fortune Bay	Anti-Confederate	1865
John Munn	Harbour Grace	Confederate	1869
William S. Green	Harbour Grace	Confederate	1865
Joseph I. Little	Harbour Main	Anti-Confederate	1867
John Kennedy	Harbour Main	Anti-Confederate	1869
Charles Fox Bennett	Placentia and St. Mary's	Anti-Confederate	1869
Robert John Parsons, Jr.	Placentia and St. Mary's	Anti-Confederate	1867
Henry Renouf (Note: Elected in both Placentia and St. Mary's and St. John's West)	Placentia and St. Mary's	Anti-Confederate	1861
James B. Woods	Port de Grave	Anti-Confederate	1869
William P. Walsh	St. John's East	Anti-Confederate	1869
James Jordan	St. John's East	Anti-Confederate	1869
Robert John Parsons	St. John's East	Anti-Confederate	1843
Peter Brennan	St. John's West	Anti-Confederate	1866
Thomas Talbot	St. John's West	Anti-Confederate	1861
Henry Renouf	St. John's West	Anti-Confederate	1861
Lewis Tessier (1870)	St. John's West	Anti-Confederate	1870
Maurice Fenelon (1871)	St. John's West	Anti-Confederate	1871
Stephen Rendell	Trinity Bay	Confederate	1859
Thomas H. Ridley	Trinity Bay	Confederate	1869
Robert Alsop	Trinity Bay	Anti-Confederate	1866
Alexander Graham (1871)	Trinity Bay	Anti-Confederate	1871
John Henry Warren (1870)	Trinity Bay	Confederate	1852, (Note: Bonavista Bay) 1870
Charles Duder	Twillingate and Fogo	Anti-Confederate	1869
Smith McKay	Twillingate and Fogo	Anti-Confederate	1869

== By-elections ==
By-elections were held to replace members for various reasons:

Electoral district	Member elected	Affiliation	Election date	Reason
St. John's West	Lewis Tessier	Anti-Confederate	March 31, 1870	H Renouf chose to sit for Placentia and St. Mary's
Bay de Verde	James J. Rogerson	Confederate	April 5, 1870	J Bemister named sheriff
Ferryland	Thomas Glen	Anti-Confederate	August 1870	T Glen named to cabinet in 1870
Harbour Main	Joseph I. Little	Anti-Confederate	August 1870	JI Little named to cabinet in 1870
Placentia and St. Mary's	Henry Renouf	Anti-Confederate	September 1870	H Renouf named to cabinet in 1870
Trinity Bay	John Henry Warren	Confederate	September 17, 1870	R Alsop named to cabinet in 1870
St. John's West	Maurice Fenelon	Anti-Confederate	January 16, 1871	T Talbot named to Legislative Council
Bonavista Bay	James L. Noonan	Confederate	October 26, 1871	JL Noonan named to cabinet in 1871
Trinity Bay	Alexander Graham	Anti-Confederate	October 26, 1871	T Ridley resigned seat in 1871 after firm went insolvent
