= 6th General Assembly of Newfoundland =

Colony of Newfoundland legislature

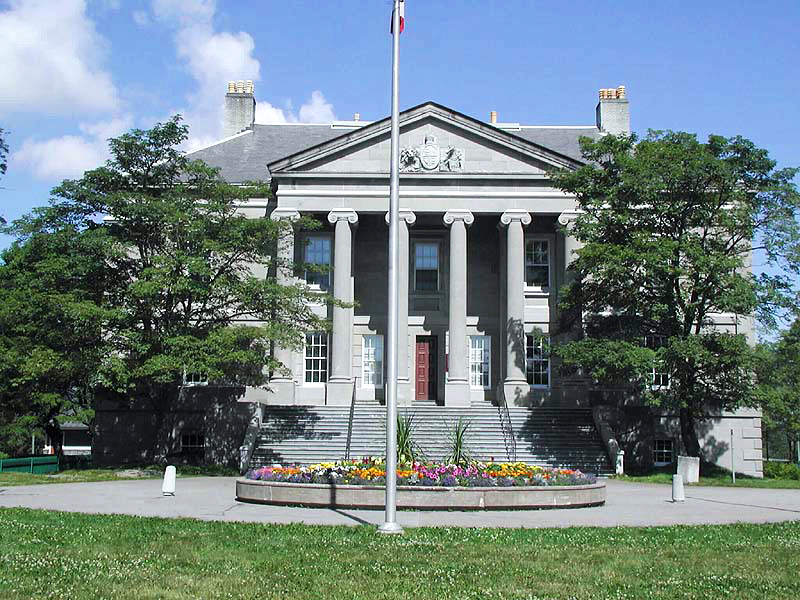
- Colonial Building seat of the Newfoundland government and the House of Assembly from January 28, 1850, to July 28, 1959.

History
- Founded: 1855
- Disbanded: 1859
- Preceded by: 5th General Assembly of Newfoundland
- Succeeded by: 7th General Assembly of Newfoundland

Leadership
- Premier: Philip Francis Little (1855-1858)
- Premier: John Kent (from 1858)

Elections
- Last election: 1855 Newfoundland general election

The members of the 6th General Assembly of Newfoundland were elected in the Newfoundland general election held in May 1855. The general assembly sat from 1855 to 1859.

This was the first election held after responsible government was granted to the colony. The Liberal Party led by Philip Francis Little won the election and Little became Newfoundland's first premier. After Little resigned as leader in 1858, John Kent served as premier.

Ambrose Shea was chosen as speaker.

Sir Charles Henry Darling served as colonial governor of Newfoundland until February 1857, when he was named governor of Jamaica. Later that year, Darling was succeeded by Sir Alexander Bannerman,

== Members of the Assembly ==
The following members were elected to the assembly in 1855:

Member	Electoral district	Affiliation	First elected / previously elected
John Bemister	Bay de Verde	Conservative	1852
Robert Carter	Bonavista Bay	Conservative	1842, 1855
John Henry Warren	Bonavista Bay	Conservative	1852
Matthew W. Walbank	Bonavista Bay	Conservative	1855
Robert Henry Prowse	Burgeo-La Poile	Conservative	1855
Clement Benning	Burin	Liberal	1852
Patrick Morris	Burin	Liberal	1855
Edmund Hanrahan	Carbonear	Liberal	1842
Thomas Glen	Ferryland	Conservative	1855
Edward Dalton Shea	Ferryland	Liberal	1855
Hugh William Hoyles	Fortune Bay	Conservative	1848
James Luke Prendergast	Harbour Grace	Liberal	1842, 1855
John Hayward	Harbour Grace	Conservative	1852
Thomas Byrne	Harbour Main	Liberal	1855
William Talbot	Harbour Main	Liberal	1852
George James Hogsett	Placentia and St. Mary's	Liberal	1852
Michael John Kelly	Placentia and St. Mary's	Liberal	1855
John Delaney	Placentia and St. Mary's	Liberal	1848, 1855
Robert Brown	Port de Grave	Conservative	1855
John Kent	St. John's East	Liberal	1832, 1848
Robert John Parsons	St. John's East	Liberal	1843
Peter Winser	St. John's East	Liberal	1837, 1855
John Kavanagh (1857)	St. John's East	Liberal	1857
John Fox	St. John's West	Liberal	1855
Ambrose Shea	St. John's West	Liberal	1848
Philip Francis Little	St. John's West	Liberal	1850
John Casey (1857)	St. John's West	Liberal	1857
J. J. Gearin (1858)	St. John's West	Liberal	1858
Stephen March	Trinity Bay	Conservative	1852
John Winter	Trinity Bay	Conservative	1855
F.B.T. Carter	Trinity Bay	Conservative	1855
William Henry Ellis	Twillingate and Fogo	Conservative	1855
Thomas Knight	Twillingate and Fogo	Conservative	1855
William Whiteway (1858)	Twillingate and Fogo	Conservative	1858

== By-elections ==
By-elections were held to replace members for various reasons:

Electoral district	Member elected	Affiliation	Election date	Reason
St. John's East	John Kavanagh	Liberal	1857	P Winser resigned in 1857
St. John's West	John Casey	Liberal	1857	J Fox named to Legislative Council in 1857
Twillingate and Fogo	William Whiteway	Conservative	1858	J H Ellis died March 28, 1858
St. John's West	J. J. Gearin	Liberal	1858	P F Little resigned seat in 1858
