= List of prime ministers of Queen Victoria =

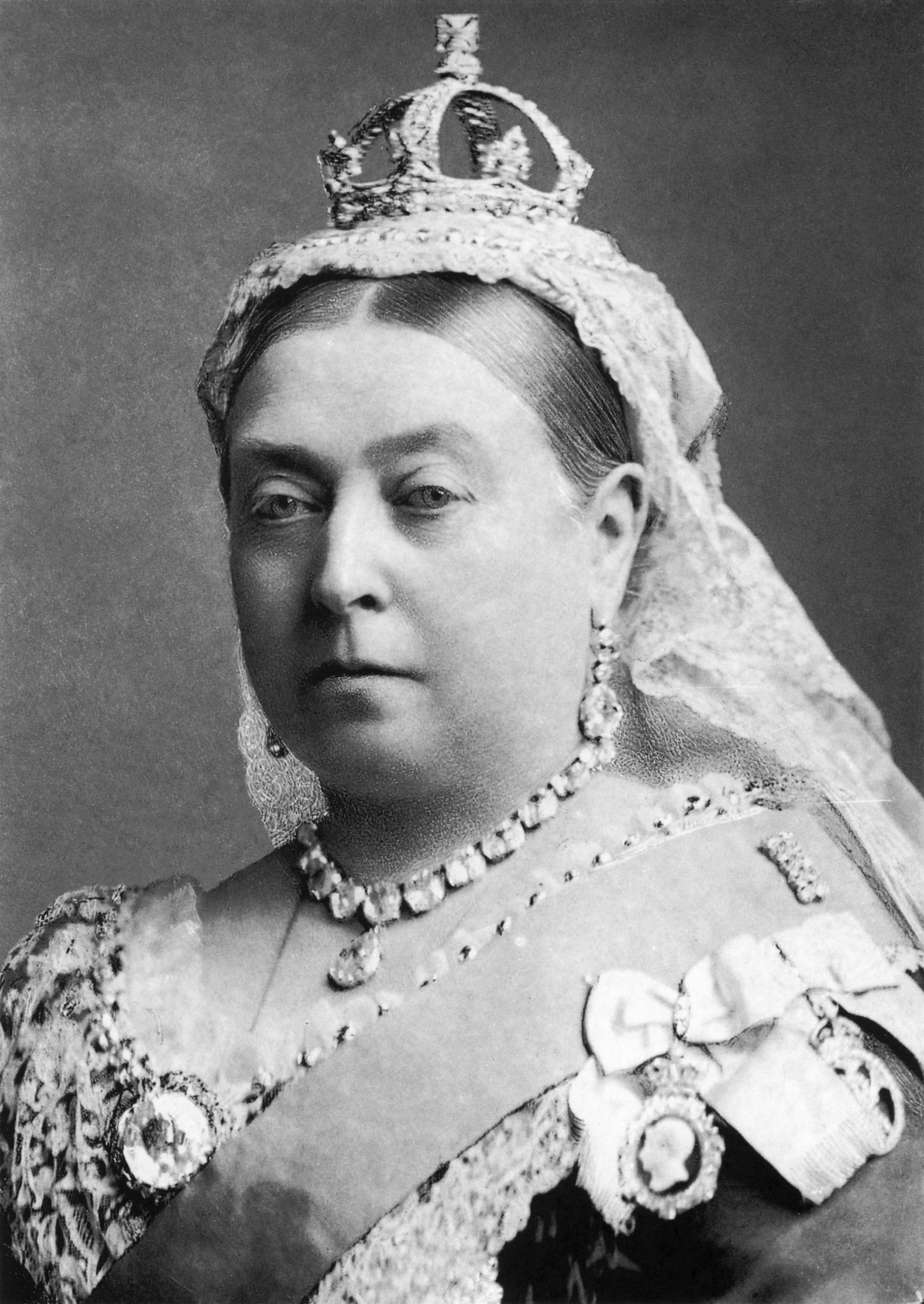
Queen and Empress Victoria

Queen Victoria was the monarch of the United Kingdom of Great Britain and Ireland and of the British Empire from 20 June 1837 until her death on 22 January 1901. At the start of her reign, responsible government outside of the United Kingdom itself was unknown, but starting in the 1840s this would change.

During her reign Victoria was served by well over 33 prime ministers: 15 from New Zealand, 10 from the United Kingdom, 7 from the Dominion of Canada, and 1 from Australia.

== Australia ==
Commonwealth of Australia
Portrait	Name (Birth–Death)	Term of office Electoral mandates		Party	Ministry
	The Right Honourable; Sir Edmund Barton; GCMG MP KC (1849–1920)	1 January 1901	24 September 1903	Protectionist	Barton
	The Right Honourable; Sir Edmund Barton; GCMG MP KC (1849–1920)	1901		Protectionist	Barton

== Canada ==
=== Pre-Confederation ===
==== New Brunswick ====
Premiers of the Colony of New Brunswick (1854–1867)
1st	Charles Fisher (1st time of 2)	1 November 1854; May 1856	16th	Elected June 1854
2nd	John Hamilton Gray	21 June 1856; June 1857	17th	Elected 24 June 1856
—	Charles Fisher (2nd time of 2)	1 June 1857; 19 March 1861	18th	Elected 8 May 1857; Resigned 19 March 1861
3rd	Samuel Leonard Tilley	19 March 1861; March 1865	18th	Designated 19 March 1861
3rd	Samuel Leonard Tilley	19 March 1861; March 1865	19th	Elected 6 June 1861
4th	Albert James Smith (Anti-Confederation, unofficially)	21 September 1865; 14 April 1866	20th	Elected 24 June 1865; Resigned 14 April 1866
5th	Peter Mitchell (Confederation Party, unofficially)	14 April 1866; August 1867	20th	Designated 14 April 1866
5th	Peter Mitchell (Confederation Party, unofficially)	14 April 1866; August 1867	21st...	Elected May 1866; Resigned August 1867

==== Newfoundland ====
Premiers of the Colony of Newfoundland (1854–1901)
1st	Philip Francis Little	7 May 1855	16 July 1858	6th
2nd	John Kent	16 July 1858	March 1861	6th 7th
3rd	Sir Hugh Hoyles	March 1861	4 March 1865	7th 8th
4th	Sir Frederick Carter	1 April 1865	14 February 1870	8th 9th
5th	Charles Fox Bennett	14 February 1870	30 January 1874	10th 11th
(4th)	Sir Frederick Carter	31 January 1874	April 1878	11th 12th
6th	Sir William Whiteway	April 1878	12 October 1885	12th 13th 14th
7th	Sir Robert Thorburn	12 October 1885	December 1889	15th
(6th)	Sir William Whiteway	December 1889	April 1894	16th 17th
8th	Augustus F. Goodridge	April 1894	12 December 1894	17th
9th	Daniel Joseph Greene	December 1894	1895	17th
(6th)	Sir William Whiteway	1895	1897	17th
10th	Sir James Spearman Winter	1897	15 March 1900	18th
11th	Sir Robert Bond	15 March 1900	22 January 1901	18th

==== Nova Scotia ====
Nova Scotia became the very first colony to have permanent responsible government in the history of the British Empire.

Confederation Party Nova Scotia Liberal Party Nova Scotia New Democratic Party Progressive Conservative Association of Nova Scotia

Premiers of the Colony of Nova Scotia (1848–1867)
Premier (party)		Period	Assembly	Length of tenure
1st	James Boyle Uniacke (Liberal)	2 February 1848; 3 April 1854	18th (Note: Before Nova Scotia had its own system of responsible government, 17 assemblies had already existed.)	6 years, 60 days
1st	James Boyle Uniacke (Liberal)	2 February 1848; 3 April 1854	19th	6 years, 60 days
2nd	William Young (Liberal) (1st of 2 non-consecutive terms)	4 April 1854; 20 February 1857	19th	2 years, 322 days
2nd	William Young (Liberal) (1st of 2 non-consecutive terms)	4 April 1854; 20 February 1857	20th	2 years, 322 days
3rd	James William Johnston (Conservative) (1st of 2 non-consecutive terms)	24 February 1857; 7 February 1860	20th	2 years, 348 days
3rd	James William Johnston (Conservative) (1st of 2 non-consecutive terms)	24 February 1857; 7 February 1860	22nd (Note: There was no 21st Assembly. Due to an error made in 1860, the 21st Assembly was referred to as the 22nd, and this mistake has been perpetuated in the numbering of future assemblies.)	2 years, 348 days
—	William Young (Liberal) (2nd of 2 non-consecutive terms)	10 February 1860; 3 August 1860	22nd	175 days
4th	Joseph Howe (Liberal)	3 August 1860; 5 June 1863	22nd	2 years, 306 days
—	James William Johnston (Conservative) (2nd of 2 non-consecutive terms)	11 June 1863; 11 May 1864	23rd	335 days
5th	Charles Tupper (Confederation Party)	11 May 1864; 3 July 1867	23rd	3 years, 53 days

Became part of Canada in 1867

==== Prince Edward Island ====
Colony of Prince Edward Island (1851–1873)
1st	George Coles (Liberal) (1st time of 3)	24 April 1851; 1854	...	Designated 24 April 1851
2nd	John Holl (Conservative)	1854; 1855	19th 20th...	Elected 1854; Re-elected 1854; Resigned 1855
—	George Coles (Liberal) (2nd time of 3)	1855; 1859	...	Designated 1855
3rd	Edward Palmer (Conservative)	1859; 1863	21st	Elected 1859
4th	John Hamilton Gray (Conservative)	1863; 1865	22nd...	Elected 1863; Resigned 1865
5th	James Colledge Pope (Conservative) (1st time of 2)	1865; 1867	...	Designated 1865
—	George Coles (Liberal) (3rd time of 3)	1867; 1869	23rd 24th...	Elected 1867; Re-elected 1867; Resigned 1869
6th	Joseph Hensley (Liberal)	1869; 1869	......	Designated 1869; Resigned 1869
7th	Robert Poore Haythorne (Liberal) (1st time of 2)	1869; 1870	......	Designated 1869; Resigned 1870
—	James Colledge Pope (Conservative) (2nd time of 2)	1870; 1872	... 25th...	Designated 1870; Re-elected 1871 to a coalition Resigned 1872
—	Robert Poore Haythorne (Liberal) (2nd time of 2)	1872; April 1873	...	Designated 1872 to a coalition

Became part of Canada in 1873

=== Post-Confederation 1867-1901 ===
Canada
Portrait	Name (Birth–Death)	Term of office Electoral mandates		Party	Ministry
	John A. Macdonald (1815–1891)	1 July 1867	5 November 1873	Liberal-Conservative	1st
	John A. Macdonald (1815–1891)	1867 · 1872		Liberal-Conservative	1st
	Alexander Mackenzie (1822–1892)	7 November 1873	8 October 1878	Liberal	2nd
	Alexander Mackenzie (1822–1892)	1874		Liberal	2nd
	John A. Macdonald (1815–1891)	17 October 1878	6 June 1891	Liberal-Conservative	3rd
	John A. Macdonald (1815–1891)	1878 · 1882 · 1887 · 1891		Liberal-Conservative	3rd
	John Abbott (1821–1893)	16 June 1891	24 November 1892	Liberal-Conservative	4th
	John Thompson (1845–1894)	5 December 1892	12 December 1894	Liberal-Conservative	5th
	Mackenzie Bowell (1823–1917)	21 December 1894	27 April 1896	Conservative (historical)	6th
	Charles Tupper (1821–1915)	1 May 1896	8 July 1896	Conservative (historical)	7th
	Wilfrid Laurier (1841–1919)	11 July 1896	6 October 1911	Liberal	8th
	Wilfrid Laurier (1841–1919)	1896 · 1900 · 1904 · 1908		Liberal	8th

== Cape Colony ==
Colony of the Cape of Good Hope
No.	Portrait	Name	Term of office		Party
1		Sir John Charles Molteno	1 December 1872	5 February 1878	Independent
2		Sir John Gordon Sprigg	6 February 1878	8 May 1881	Independent
3		Thomas Charles Scanlen	9 May 1881	12 May 1884	Independent
4		Thomas Upington	13 May 1884	24 November 1886	Independent
—		Sir John Gordon Sprigg	25 November 1886	16 July 1890	Independent
5		Cecil John Rhodes	17 July 1890	12 January 1896	Independent
—		Sir John Gordon Sprigg	13 January 1896	13 October 1898	Independent
6		William Schreiner	13 October 1898	17 June 1900	Independent
—		Sir John Gordon Sprigg	18 June 1900	21 February 1904	Progressive

== New Zealand ==
- From 1856 until 1869 the office now referred to as prime minister of New Zealand was called colonial secretary and from 1869 until 1907 was called premier of New Zealand.

Henry Sewell	7 May 1856 – 20 May 1856
William Fox	20 May 1856–2 June 1856; 12 July 1861–6 August 1862; 28 June 1869–10 September 1872; 3 March 1873 – 8 April 1873
Edward Stafford	2 June 1856–12 July 1861; 16 October 1865–28 June 1869; 10 September 1872 – 11 October 1872
Alfred Domett	6 August 1862 – 30 October 1863
Frederick Whitaker	30 October 1863 – 24 November 1864
Frederick Weld	24 November 1864–16 October 1865; 21 April 1882 – 25 September 1883
George Waterhouse	11 October 1872 – 3 March 1873
Julius Vogel	8 April 1873–6 July 1875; 15 February 1876 – 1 September 1876
Daniel Pollen	6 July 1875 – 15 February 1876
Harry Atkinson	1 September 1876–13 October 1877; 25 September 1883–16 August 1884; 28 August 1884–3 September 1884; 8 October 1887 – 24 January 1891
George Grey	13 October 1877 – 8 October 1879
John Hall	8 October 1879 – 21 April 1882
Robert Stout	16 August 1884–28 August 1884; 3 September 1884 – 8 October 1887
John Ballance	24 January 1891 – 27 April 1893
Richard Seddon	27 April 1893 – 22 January 1901

== United Kingdom ==
William Lamb; The Viscount Melbourne	20 June 1837 – 30 August 1841
Sir Robert Peel	30 August 1841 – 29 June 1846
Lord John Russell	30 June 1846 – 21 February 1852; 29 October 1865 – 26 June 1866
Edward Smith-Stanley; The Earl of Derby	23 February 1852 – 17 December 1852; 20 February 1858 – 11 June 1859; 28 June 1866 – 25 February 1868
George Hamilton-Gordon; The Earl of Aberdeen	19 December 1852 – 30 January 1855
Henry John Temple; The Viscount Palmerston	6 February 1855 – 19 February 1858; 12 June 1859 – 18 October 1865
Benjamin Disraeli	27 February 1868 – 1 December 1868; 20 February 1874 – 21 April 1880
William Ewart Gladstone	3 December 1868 – 17 February 1874; 23 April 1880 – 9 June 1885; 1 February 1886 – 20 July 1886; 15 August 1892 – 2 March 1894
Robert Gascoyne-Cecil; The Marquess of Salisbury	23 June 1885 – 28 January 1886; 25 July 1886 – 11 August 1892; 25 June 1895 – 22 January 1901
Archibald Primrose; The Earl of Rosebery	5 March 1894 – 22 June 1895

== See also ==
- British Empire
- Constitutional monarchy
- Dominion
