= 11th General Assembly of Newfoundland =

Colony of Newfoundland legislature

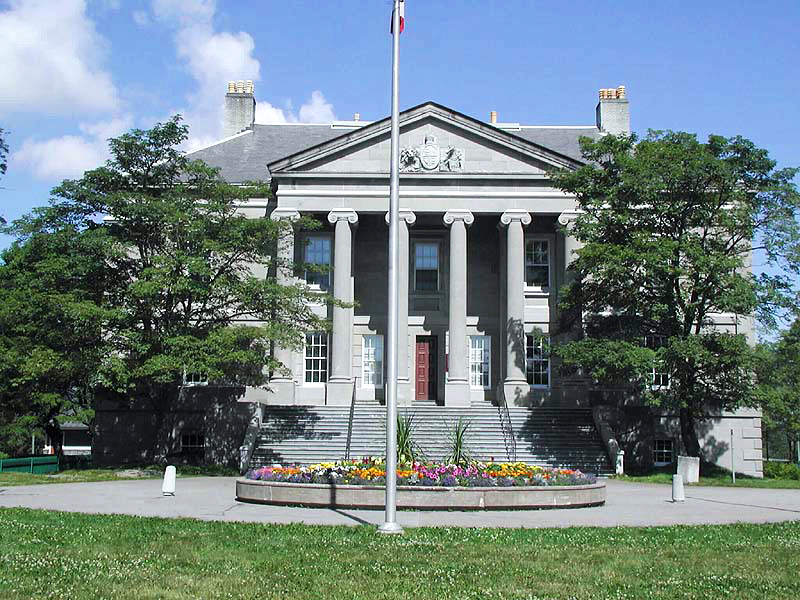
- Colonial Building seat of the Newfoundland government and the House of Assembly from January 28, 1850, to July 28, 1959.

History
- Founded: 1874
- Disbanded: 1874
- Preceded by: 10th General Assembly of Newfoundland
- Succeeded by: 12th General Assembly of Newfoundland

Leadership
- Premier: Frederick Carter

Elections
- Last election: 1873 Newfoundland general election

The members of the 11th General Assembly of Newfoundland were elected in the Newfoundland general election held in November 1873. The general assembly sat from February 1874 to Fall 1874.

The Anti-Confederation Party led by Charles Fox Bennett won the election. However, defections and resignations before the assembly's opening reduced his party to a minority and Frederick Carter formed the government in 1874.

Prescott Emerson was chosen as speaker.

Sir Stephen John Hill served as colonial governor of Newfoundland.

== Members of the Assembly ==
The following members were elected to the assembly in 1873:

Member	Electoral district	Affiliation	First elected / previously elected
James J. Rogerson	Bay de Verde	Conservative	1870
Charles Bowring	Bonavista Bay	Conservative	1873
Alexander J.W. McNeilly	Bonavista Bay	Conservative	1873
John Burton	Bonavista Bay	Conservative	1865, 1873
Prescott Emerson	Burgeo-La Poile	Conservative	1869
James S. Winter	Burin	Conservative	1873
Charles R. Ayre	Burin	Conservative	1873
John Rorke	Carbonear	Conservative	1863
Thomas Glen	Ferryland	Anti-Confederate	1855
Richard Raftus	Ferryland	Anti-Confederate	1873
Thomas R. Bennett (Note: Named a judge January 9, 1874)	Fortune Bay	Anti-Confederate	1865
Frederick Carter (Note: Frederick Carter was elected in two ridings)	Harbour Grace	Conservative	1859
William Wood	Harbour Grace	Conservative	1873
Ambrose Shea (1874)	Harbour Grace	Conservative	1848, 1874
Joseph I. Little	Harbour Main	Anti-Confederate	1867
Patrick Nowlan	Harbour Main	Anti-Confederate	1859, 1873
Charles Fox Bennett	Placentia and St. Mary's	Anti-Confederate	1869
James Collins	Placentia and St. Mary's	Anti-Confederate	1873
Henry Renouf	Placentia and St. Mary's	Anti-Confederate	1861
John Bartlett	Port de Grave	Anti-Confederate	1873
John J. Dearin	St. John's East	Anti-Confederate	1873
Robert John Parsons	St. John's East	Anti-Confederate	1843
Robert J. Kent	St. John's East	Anti-Confederate	1873
Lewis Tessier	St. John's West	Anti-Confederate	1870
Patrick J. Scott	St. John's West	Anti-Confederate	1873
Maurice Fenelon	St. John's West	Anti-Confederate	1873
John Steer	Trinity Bay	Conservative	1873
John Warren	Trinity Bay	Conservative	1873
William Whiteway	Trinity Bay	Conservative	1859, 1873
Frederick Carter	Twillingate and Fogo	Conservative	1859
Charles Duder (Note: Joined Conservatives in 1874)	Twillingate and Fogo	Anti-Confederate	1869
Charles Duder	Twillingate and Fogo	Conservative	1869
Smith McKay	Twillingate and Fogo	Anti-Confederate	1869

== By-elections ==
By-elections were held to replace members for various reasons:

Electoral district	Member elected	Affiliation	Election date	Reason
Harbour Grace	Ambrose Shea	Conservative	January 17, 1874	F Carter chose to sit for Twillingate and Fogo
