= Thomas Badcock =

Newfoundland politician

Member of the House of Assembly for Ferryland
- In office 1869–1873 Serving with Thomas Glen
- Preceded by: Micheal Kearney; Thomas Glen
- Succeeded by: Richard Raftus; Thomas Glen

Thomas Badcock was a politician in the Colony of Newfoundland who represented the district of Ferryland in the Newfoundland House of Assembly from 1869 to 1873. He was a member of the Anti-Confederation Party.
