= Results of the 1867 Canadian federal election =

1867 Canadian federal election

== Results by Province ==
=== New Brunswick ===
Results in New Brunswick
Party	Seats	Second	Third	Fourth	Votes	%	+/-
Liberals	12	0	0	0	9,699	49.53	
Unknown	0	11	2	1	7,702	39.33	
Liberal–Conservative	2	0	0	0	2,180	11.13	
Conservative	1	0	0	0	0	0	
Total	15				19,581	100.0	

=== Nova Scotia ===
Results in Nova Scotia
Party	Seats	Second	Third	Fourth	Votes	%	+/-
Anti-Confederation	18	1	0	0	21,239	58.24	
Unknown	0	6	2	1	8,410	23.06	
Conservative	1	5	0	0	5,525	15.15	
Liberal–Conservative	0	1	0	0	1,289	3.54	
Total	19				36,463	100.0	

=== Ontario ===
Results in Ontario
Party	Seats	Second	Third	Votes	%	+/-
Unknown	0	58	7	49,803	35.62	
Conservative	33	4	0	36,652	26.21	
Liberals	33	1	0	33,105	23.67	
Liberal–Conservative	16	2	0	17,470	12.49	
Independent	0	1	0	1,756	1.26	
Independent Liberal	0	1	0	1,048	0.75	
Total	82			139,834	100.0	

=== Quebec ===
Results in Quebec
Party	Seats	Second	Third	Votes	%	+/-
Unknown	0	37	3	23,605	32.6	
Conservative	36	2	0	22,002	30.38	
Liberals	17	2	0	18,014	24.88	
Liberal–Conservative	11	0	0	8,791	12.14	
Total	64			72,412	100.0	
