= Charles Duder =

Newfoundland politician (1818–1879)

Charles Duder MHA

Member of the Newfoundland House of Assembly for Twillingate and Fogo
- In office November 13, 1869 – November 9, 1878 Serving with Smith McKay (1869–1874); Frederick Carter (1873–1878); William Kelligrew (1874–1878)
- Preceded by: Thomas Knight; William Whiteway
- Succeeded by: Stanley B. Carter; A. J. W. McNeilly; Richard P. Rice

Personal details
- Born: c. 1818 Torquay, Devon, England, U.K.
- Died: January 26, 1879 (aged 60–61) St. John's, Newfoundland Colony
- Party: Anti-Confederation (1869–1873); Conservative (1873–1878)
- Occupation: Merchant

Charles R. Duder (c. 1818 – January 26, 1879) was an English-born merchant and political figure in Newfoundland. He represented Twillingate and Fogo in the Newfoundland and Labrador House of Assembly from 1869 to 1878 as an Anti-Confederate and then Conservative.

He was born at Torquay, Devon and came to Newfoundland in the 1830s to work for Edwin Duder (Senior), likely his brother. Duder switched his allegiance in the assembly from Charles Fox Bennett to Frederick Carter in 1873. He served as chairman of the Board of Works from 1874 to 1878. He died in St. John's in 1879.
