= Smith McKay =

Newfoundland politician (1817–1889)

Smith McKay MHA

Member of the Newfoundland House of Assembly for Twillingate Twillingate and Fogo (1869–1885)
- In office November 6, 1882 – November 6, 1889 Serving with Richard P. Rice (1882–1885); Jabez P. Thompson (1882–1885); Augustus F. Goodridge (1885–1889); Michael T. Knight (1885–1889)
- Preceded by: Stanley B. Carter; A. J. W. McNeilly
- Succeeded by: Edward P. Burgess; Thomas Peyton; Jabez P. Thompson
- In office November 13, 1869 – November 7, 1874 Serving with Charles Duder (1869–1874); Frederick Carter (1873–1874)
- Preceded by: Thomas Knight; William Whiteway
- Succeeded by: William Kelligrew

Personal details
- Born: 1817 Pictou, Nova Scotia
- Died: December 8, 1889 (aged 65–66) St. John's, Newfoundland Colony
- Party: Anti-Confederation (1869–1873); Conservative (1882–1885); Reform (1885–1889)
- Spouse: Susan Lock (m. 1869)
- Occupation: Merchant, sealing captain, mine owner

Smith McKay (1817 – December 8, 1889) was a prospector, merchant and political figure in Newfoundland. He represented Twillingate-Fogo in the Newfoundland and Labrador House of Assembly from 1869 to 1874 and from 1882 to 1889.

He was born in Pictou, Nova Scotia and came to Newfoundland in 1844, becoming a partner in a fishery supply and export business. McKay also was captain of a sealing ship and commanded a schooner which brought back oil from humpback whales. He was a partner in the Union Copper Mine, the first significant mining operation in the colony, with Charles James Fox Bennett. McKay was manager for the mine and also was involved in other mining ventures. In 1869, he married Susan Lock. He served as chairman of the Board of Works from 1883 to 1889. McKay died in office in St. John's in 1889.
