= Prowseton =

Prowseton Sibley's Cove, Civilly's Cove, Civil East Cove
- Abandoned Town
- Location of Prowseton in Newfoundland
- Coordinates: 47°40′36.4″N 54°18′58.2″W
- Country: Canada
- Province: Newfoundland and Labrador
- Census division: 2

Population (1966)
  - Total: 28
- Time zone: UTC– 3:30 (Newfoundland Time)
  - Summer (DST): UTC– 2:30 (Newfoundland Daylight)
- Area code: 709
- Bay: Placentia Bay

Prowseton, formerly known as Civilly's Cove, Sibley's Cove, or Civil East Cove, is an abandoned town in Newfoundland and Labrador that had a population of 28 in 1966. Its name was changed in 1915 to avoid confusion with the nearby town of Sibley's Cove in Trinity Bay and to honour Judge D.W. Prowse. The town was mostly abandoned by the mid 1960s but had a few residents up until the 1990s.
