= W. G. Flood =

Newfoundland politician (1835–1861)

Member of the Newfoundland House of Assembly for Placentia-St. Mary's
- In office May 2, 1861 – October 31, 1861 Serving with Ambrose Shea and Richard McGrath
- Preceded by: George Hogsett; John English
- Succeeded by: Pierce M. Barron

Personal details
- Born: William George Flood c. 1835
- Died: October 31, 1861 (aged 25–26) St. John's, Newfoundland Colony
- Party: Liberal
- Spouse: Elizabeth Merchant (m. 1858)
- Occupation: Lawyer

William George Flood (1835 – October 31, 1861) was a Newfoundland lawyer and politician. As a Liberal supporter of John Kent, he represented the district of Placentia-St. Mary's in the Newfoundland House of Assembly from May to October 1861.

== Biography ==
Before entering politics, Flood was a lawyer who lived at Retreat Cottage in St. John's. He was both a Roman Catholic and an Anglican. He was elected to the House of Assembly for the district of Placentia-St. Mary's by acclamation in the 1861 election. Flood's term in the legislature was brief as he died at home just several months later. He was buried at the Belvedere Cemetery in St. John's.
