= Robert Alsop =

Newfoundland politician (1814–1871)

The Honourable Robert Alsop MHA MLC

Colonial Secretary
- In office 1869–1871
- Premier: Charles Fox Bennett
- Preceded by: John Bemister
- Succeeded by: James L. Noonan

Member of the Legislative Council of Newfoundland
- In office November 8, 1870 – March 25, 1871
- Nominated by: Charles Fox Bennett
- Appointed by: Stephen J. Hill

Member of the Newfoundland House of Assembly for Trinity Bay
- In office October 29, 1866 – September 17, 1870 Serving with Stephen Rendell (1866–1870); Frederick J. Wyatt (1866–1869); Thomas H. Ridley (1869–1870)
- Preceded by: Stephen March
- Succeeded by: John H. Warren

Personal details
- Born: 1814
- Died: March 25, 1871 (aged 56–57) St. John's, Newfoundland Colony
- Party: Liberal (1866–1869); Anti-Confederation (1869–1871)
- Occupation: Merchant

Robert Alsop (1814 – March 25, 1871) was a merchant and political figure in Newfoundland. He represented Trinity Bay in the Newfoundland and Labrador House of Assembly from 1866 to 1871 as a Liberal and then anti-Confederate.

He was a partner in the mercantile and shipping company R. Alsop and Company based in St. John's. Alsop was first elected in a by-election held in 1866. He served in the Executive Council as chairman of the Board of Works. He was opposed to union with Canada. Alsop was named colonial secretary in 1870. When he ran for reelection because he had been named to a cabinet post, he was defeated but then was named to the Legislative Council, continuing to serve as colonial secretary until his death in St. John's in 1871.
