= Joseph Ignatius Little =

Newfoundland politician (1835–1902)

The Honourable Sir Joseph Ignatius Little MHA

15th Chief Justice of Newfoundland
- In office 1898 – July 14, 1902
- Preceded by: Frederick Carter
- Succeeded by: William Horwood

Minister without portfolio
- In office 1882–1883
- Premier: William Whiteway

Attorney General
- In office 1869 – January 31, 1874
- Premier: Charles Fox Bennett
- Preceded by: John Kent
- Succeeded by: Frederick Carter

Member of the Newfoundland House of Assembly for Harbour Main
- In office November 28, 1867 – 1883 Serving with George Hogsett (1867–1869); John Kennedy (1869–1873); Patrick Nowlan (1873–1882); Richard MacDonnell (1882–1883)
- Preceded by: Charles Furey
- Succeeded by: John Veitch

Personal details
- Born: 1835 Charlottetown, Prince Edward Island
- Died: July 14, 1902 (aged 66–67) St. John's, Newfoundland
- Party: Liberal (1867–1869; 1874–1882); Anti-Confederation (1869–1874); Conservative (1882–1883)
- Relatives: Philip Little (brother); Patrick J. Scott (brother-in-law)
- Occupation: Lawyer and judge

Sir Joseph Ignatius Little (1835 – 14 July 1902) was a lawyer, politician, and judge in the Newfoundland Colony.

== Biography ==
Little was born in Charlottetown, Prince Edward Island, the son of Cornelius Little and Brigid (née Costin). He was a lawyer by profession, and was called to the Newfoundland Bar in 1859. Elected to the Newfoundland and Labrador House of Assembly for Harbour Main in an 1867 by-election, he was attorney general 1870–75 in the cabinet of Charles Fox Bennett, and was a minister without portfolio in the cabinet of William Whiteway.

In 1883 he was appointed to the Supreme Court of Newfoundland, and became Chief Justice in 1898. He was knighted in the 1901 Birthday Honours list, effective from 19 December 1901.

Little died in office on 14 July 1902 in St John's, Newfoundland.

Legal offices
Preceded by Sir Frederick Carter	Chief Justice of Newfoundland; 1898–1902	Succeeded by Sir William Henry Horwood
