= Thomas S. Dwyer =

Newfoundland politician

T. S. Dwyer

Member of the House of Assembly for St. John's West
- In office 1859–1861 Serving with Pierce M. Barron and John Casey
- Preceded by: Ambrose Shea; J. J. Gearin; John Casey
- Succeeded by: John Casey; Thomas Talbot; Henry Renouf

Thomas S. Dwyer was a Newfoundland politician who represented the district of St. John's West from 1859 to 1861.
