= Confederation Party =

Term for political parties supporting Canadian Confederation

Confederation Party was a term for the parties supporting Canadian Confederation in the British colonies of New Brunswick, Nova Scotia, and Newfoundland in the 1860s when politics became polarized between supporters and opponents of Confederation. The Confederation parties were accordingly opposed by Anti-Confederation parties in those three jurisdictions. A conference was held on September 1, 1864, in Charlottetown when the Province of Canada became interested in it. John A. Macdonald was a huge promoter of Confederation and even made an alliance with his political rival, George Brown to make it happen.

In New Brunswick and Nova Scotia, the Confederation parties became Conservative parties aligned with the federal Liberal-Conservative Party of Sir John A. Macdonald (generally known simply as Conservatives), while Anti-Confederation parties became Liberals. This approximated the political dichotomy that existed prior to Confederation although, because of the realignment, some former Liberals became Conservatives and vice versa.

The acceptance of the Confederation Party was greatly influenced by the American Civil War. Other reasons were an aggressive American foreign policy and the Fenian Raids of 1866.

Some of the Maritime provinces were worried that the autonomy would be weakened if they took up the Confederation. It was also feared that the French-Canadian interests would be weakened if the Confederation was embraced in Canada East (modern-day Quebec).

== See also ==
- List of Canadian political parties
