= Edward Evans (Newfoundland politician) =

Newfoundland politician (1819–1898)

Edward Evans MHA

Member of the Newfoundland House of Assembly for Burin
- In office May 2, 1861 – November 6, 1873 Serving with Hugh Hoyles (1861–1865); Frederick Carter (1865–1873)
- Preceded by: James J. Rogerson; Ambrose Shea
- Succeeded by: Charles R. Ayre; James S. Winter

Personal details
- Born: 1819 Grand Bank, Newfoundland Colony
- Died: July 15, 1898 (aged 78–79) Grand Bank, Newfoundland Colony
- Party: Conservative
- Occupation: Merchant, lawyer

Edward Evans (1819 – July 15, 1898) was a Newfoundland merchant and politician who represented the district of Burin in the House of Assembly from 1861 to 1873.

== Mercantile career and politics ==
Evans was born in the fishing village of Grand Bank and was educated at the local Wesleyan academy there. He established himself as a prominent merchant and lawyer serving clients in the south coast of Newfoundland.

Evans first attempted to enter politics in the 1859 general election as a Conservative candidate in the district of Burin alongside party leader Hugh Hoyles, but the ticket narrowly lost to the Liberal candidates. They were successful in the subsequent 1861 election that saw a very narrow victory for Hoyles' Conservative caucus. When Hoyles resigned in 1865, Frederick Carter succeeded him as both premier and Evans' colleague in the Burin district for that year's general election. A supporter of Newfoundland's confederation with Canada, Evans retained his support of Carter and his administration in the 1869 election contest over the issue. Although the two men won re-election by a razor-thin margin of just two or three votes, the Conservative caucus were defeated by the Anti-Confederation Party led by Charles Fox Bennett.

Evans chose to retire in 1873 and he was subsequently appointed as a justice of the peace in Grand Bank. He spent the remainder of his life there and died on July 15, 1898.
