= Robert John Pinsent (judge) =

Newfoundland lawyer and politician (1834–1893)

Sir Robert John Pinsent DCL QC
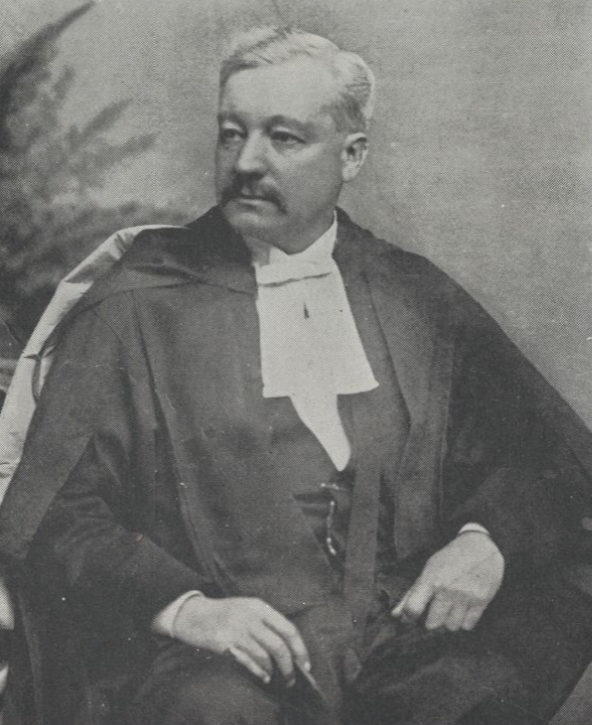

Member of the Legislative Council of Newfoundland
- In office 1870–1880
- Appointed by: Charles Fox Bennett
- In office 1859–1867
- Appointed by: John Kent

Member of the Newfoundland House of Assembly for Port de Grave
- In office January 14, 1867 – October 28, 1869
- Preceded by: John Leamon
- Succeeded by: James B. Woods

Personal details
- Born: Robert John Pinsent; July 27, 1834 Port de Grave, Newfoundland Colony
- Died: April 28, 1893 (aged 58) England
- Party: Conservative
- Spouse(s): Anna Brown Cooke (m. 1856) Emily Hettie Sabine Homfray (m. 1873)
- Children: 9
- Occupation: Lawyer

Sir Robert John Pinsent (July 27, 1834 – April 28, 1893) was a lawyer, judge and political figure in Newfoundland. He represented Port de Grave in the Newfoundland and Labrador House of Assembly from 1867 to 1869.

Pinsent was born in Port de Grave, the son of Robert John Pinsent and Louisa Broom. He was educated in Harbour Grace, then studied law with Bryan Robinson and was admitted to the bar in 1856. He was named to the Legislative Council in 1859. In 1865, he was named Queen's Counsel. Pinsent was first elected to the Newfoundland assembly in an 1867 by-election. Originally elected without any party affiliations, he was defeated when he ran for reelection in 1869 as a supporter of union with Canada. Soon afterwards, he was named to the Legislative Council again. He ran unsuccessfully for election in Trinity Bay in 1873 as an opponent of Confederation. In 1878, Pinsent ran unsuccessfully in Burin as a proponent of Confederation. In 1880, he was named to the Supreme Court of Newfoundland and Labrador. Pinsent was married twice: to Anna Brown Cooke around 1856 and to Emily Hettie Sabine Homfray around 1873. He died suddenly in England at the age of 58 while seeking medical attention there.
