= Peter Brennan (Newfoundland politician) =

Newfoundland politician (1786–1887)

Peter Brennan MHA

Member of the Newfoundland House of Assembly for St. John's West
- In office June 2, 1866 – November 8, 1873 Serving with Henry Renouf (1866–1869); Thomas Talbot (1866–1871); Lewis Tessier (1870–1873); Maurice Fenelon (1871–1873)
- Preceded by: John Casey
- Succeeded by: Patrick J. Scott

Personal details
- Born: 1786 County Kilkenny, Ireland
- Died: August 13, 1887 (aged 100–101) St. John's, Newfoundland Colony
- Party: Liberal (1866–1869); Anti-Confederation (1869–1873)
- Occupation: Bonesetter

Peter Brennan (1786 – August 13, 1887) was an Irish-born political figure in Newfoundland. He represented St. John's West in the Newfoundland Assembly from 1866 to 1873.

He was born in County Kilkenny and came to St. John's in 1819, where he worked for a time as a bonesetter. He was first elected to the assembly in an 1866 by-election. Brennan died in St. John's in 1887.
