= Robert Brown (Newfoundland politician) =

Newfoundland politician

Member of the House of Assembly for Port de Grave
- In office 1855–1859
- Preceded by: New District
- Succeeded by: John Leamon

Personal details
- Party: Conservative

Robert Brown was a politician in the Newfoundland Colony who represented the district of Port de Grave in the House of Assembly from 1855 to 1859.
