= James B. Woods =

Newfoundland politician (1800–1875)

James B. Woods MHA

Member of the Newfoundland House of Assembly for Port de Grave
- In office November 13, 1869 – November 8, 1873
- Preceded by: Robert J. Pinsent
- Succeeded by: John Bartlett

Personal details
- Born: James Bryan Woods c. 1800
- Died: August 17, 1875 (aged 74–75) St. John's, Newfoundland Colony
- Party: Anti-Confederation
- Spouse: Jessie Clift (m. 1841)
- Relatives: James Shannon Clift (brother-in-law)
- Occupation: Merchant

James Bryan Woods (c. 1800 – August 17, 1875) was a merchant and political figure in Newfoundland. He represented Port de Grave in the Newfoundland and Labrador House of Assembly from 1869 to 1873.

He was a business partner with his brother-in-law J. Shannon Clift in a commission merchant and ship brokerage business in St. John's.
