= John English (Newfoundland politician) =

Newfoundland politician

J. W. English

Member of the House of Assembly for Placentia-St. Mary's
- In office 1859–1861 Serving with George James Hogsett; John Delaney (1859–1860); Richard McGrath (1860–1861)
- Preceded by: George James Hogsett; Michael John Kelly; John Delaney
- Succeeded by: Ambrose Shea; W. G. Flood; Richard McGrath

Personal details
- Party: Liberal

John W. English was a Newfoundland politician who represented the district of Placentia-St. Mary's in the House of Assembly.
