= Patrick Morris (Newfoundland politician) =

Newfoundland politician

Member of the House of Assembly for Burin
- In office 1855–1859 Serving with Clement Pitt Benning
- Preceded by: Clement Pitt Benning
- Succeeded by: James Johnstone Rogerson; Sir Ambrose Shea

Personal details
- Party: Liberal

Patrick Morris was a Newfoundland politician who represented the district of Burin from 1855 to 1859.
