= Stanley B. Carter =

Canadian lawyer (1853–1888)

Stanley Bayley Carter (1853 – May 8, 1888) was a lawyer and politician in Newfoundland. He represented Twillingate and Fogo in the Newfoundland House of Assembly from 1878 to 1882.

The son of Frederick Carter, he was born in St. John's, was educated there and was called to the Newfoundland bar in 1876. Carter did not run for reelection in 1882. He died of tuberculosis six years later.
