= Thomas H. Ridley =

Newfoundland politician (1828–1904)

Thomas H. Ridley MHA MLC

Member of the Legislative Council of Newfoundland
- In office June 13, 1855 – 1869
- Nominated by: Philip Little
- Appointed by: Sir Charles Darling
- Succeeded by: Augustus W. Harvey; Robert Thorburn

Member of the Newfoundland House of Assembly for Trinity Bay
- In office November 13, 1869 – 1871 Serving with Robert Alsop and Stephen Rendell
- Preceded by: Frederick J. Wyatt
- Succeeded by: Alexander Graham

Personal details
- Born: Thomas Harrison Ridley; 1828 Harbour Grace, Newfoundland Colony
- Died: March 22, 1904 (aged 75–76) London, England
- Party: Conservative
- Parent: Thomas Ridley (father)
- Occupation: Merchant

Thomas Harrison Ridley (1828 – March 22, 1904) was a merchant and political figure in Colony of Newfoundland. He represented Trinity Bay in the Newfoundland and Labrador House of Assembly from 1869 to 1871 as a Confederate.

He was born in Harbour Grace, the son of Thomas Ridley. Ridley entered his father's fishery supply business. He served as a member of the Legislative Council from 1855 to 1869. In 1871, Ridley resigned his seat in the assembly and moved to England. By this time, the family business was failing: it was declared insolvent in 1873. Ridley died in London.
