= Frederick J. Wyatt =

Newfoundland politician

Member of the House of Assembly for Bonavista Bay
- In office 1864–1869 Serving with Stephen March; John Henry Warren
- Preceded by: Matthew W. Walbank
- Succeeded by: John Henry Warren; John T. Oakley; John T. Burton

Member of the House of Assembly for Trinity Bay
- In office 1865–1869 Serving with Stephen Rendell; Stephen March (1865–1866); Robert Alsop (1866–1869)
- Preceded by: Stephen Rendell; John Winter; Frederick Carter
- Succeeded by: Stephen Rendell; Thomas H. Ridley; Robert Alsop

Personal details
- Party: Conservative

Frederick J. Wyatt was a Newfoundland politician who represented the district of Bonavista Bay in the House of Assembly from 1864 to 1865, and Trinity Bay from 1865 to 1869.
