= Richard McGrath (politician) =

Newfoundland politician

Member of the House of Assembly for Placentia-St. Mary's
- In office 1860–1865 Serving with Sir Ambrose Shea; W. G. Flood (Note: Served from 1861-1861 before dying); Pierce M. Barron (Note: Served from 1861-1865)
- Preceded by: John Delaney; J. W. English; George Hogsett
- Succeeded by: Sir Ambrose Shea; Pierce M. Barron; Thomas O'Reilly

Personal details
- Party: Liberal
- Relatives: J. F. McGrath (son); Richard T. McGrath (son)

Richard McGrath was a Newfoundland politician who served as the Member of the Newfoundland House of Assembly for Placentia-St. Mary's from 1860 to 1865. He was originally elected in 1860 following the resignation of John Delaney. He chose not to run for re-election in the 1865 election. His two sons, Richard T. McGrath and James Francis McGrath, later served as the MHA for Placentia-St. Mary's as well from 1894 to 1897 from 1900 to 1904, and from 1885 to 1894 respectively.
