= Henry J. Moore =

Newfoundland politician

Henry J. Moore MHA

Member of the House of Assembly for Harbour Grace
- In office 1861–1865 Serving with John Hayward
- Preceded by: James Luke Prendergast; John Hayward
- Succeeded by: William S. Green; Joseph Godden

Personal details
- Party: Liberal

Henry J. Moore was a Newfoundland politician who served as the member of the House of Assembly for Harbour Grace from 1861 to 1865.

During the 1861 election, riots broke out in Harbour Grace along sectarian lines between Catholics and Protestants on April 26. Three days after the violence on April 29, Moore dropped out of the election. The returning officer—rather than declaring J. L. Prendergast and John Hayward as the winners—declared the results invalid, and left the decision to the House of Assembly. The House decided to hold a by-election for November, in which Moore and Hayward were returned as the members.
