= William Kelligrew =

Canadian politician

William Kelligrew (c. 1813–1878) was an English-born merchant and politician in Newfoundland. He represented Twillingate and Fogo in the Newfoundland House of Assembly from 1874 to 1878. His surname is also spelled Killigrew or Kellegrew.

The son of John Kelligrew, he was born in Paignton, Devon and came to Newfoundland in 1824 with his father. By 1863, Kelligrew had established a small importing business. He helped prepare Newfoundland's successful claim for reparations to the Halifax Fisheries Commission in 1877.
