= Thomas Talbot (Newfoundland politician) =

Newfoundland politician (1818–1901)

The Honourable Thomas Talbot MHA MLC
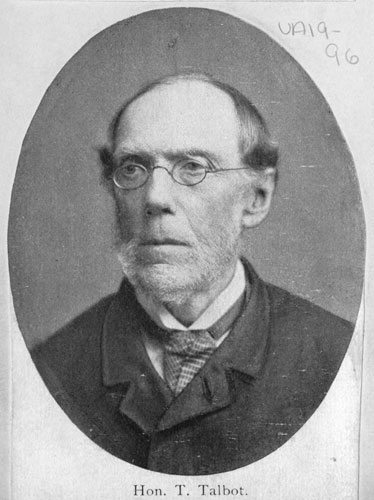
- Talbot c. 1900

Minister without portfolio
- In office 1869–1872
- Premier: Charles Fox Bennett

Member of the Legislative Council of Newfoundland
- In office 1870 – March 26, 1901
- Appointed by: Charles Fox Bennett

Member of the Newfoundland House of Assembly for St. John's West
- In office May 2, 1861 – 1870 Serving with John Casey (1861–1866); Henry Renouf (1861–1870); Peter Brennan (1866–1870); Lewis Tessier (1870)
- Preceded by: Pierce Barron; Thomas S. Dwyer
- Succeeded by: Maurice Fenelon

Personal details
- Born: c. 1818 Ooning, County Kilkenny, Ireland
- Died: March 26, 1901 (aged 82–83) St. John's, Newfoundland Colony
- Party: Liberal (1861–1869); Anti-Confederation (1869–1874)
- Relatives: William Talbot (father)
- Occupation: School teacher

Thomas Talbot (c. 1818 – March 26, 1901) was an Irish-born educator and political figure in Newfoundland. He represented St. John's West in the Newfoundland and Labrador House of Assembly from 1861 to 1870 as a Liberal and then Anti-Confederate.

The son of William Talbot, he was born in County Kilkenny and came to Newfoundland in 1837. Talbot taught school in Harbour Grace and later St. John's. He served as a member of the Executive Council from 1869 to 1872 as a minister without portfolio. He resigned after he was named high sheriff in 1872. In 1870, he was named to the Legislative Council and served until his death in St. John's in 1901.

In 1882, Talbot published Newfoundland; or, a letter addressed to a friend in Ireland in relation to the condition and circumstances of the island of Newfoundland, with an especial view to emigration.
