= Edward Dalton Shea =

Newfoundland politician (1820–1913)

The Honourable Sir Edward Dalton Shea MHA MLC
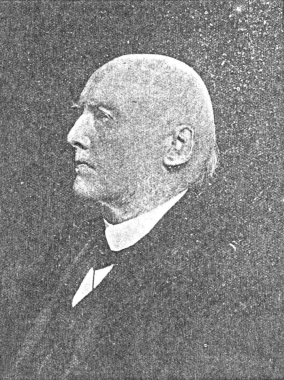

3rd President of the Legislative Council of Newfoundland
- In office February 17, 1886 – March 29, 1911
- Prime Minister: Robert Bond; Edward P. Morris
- Premier: Robert Thorburn; William Whiteway; Augustus F. Goodridge; Daniel Joseph Greene
- Governor: William Des Vœux; Henry Arthur Blake; Terence O'Brien; Herbert Harley Murray; Henry McCallum; Charles Cavendish Boyle; William MacGregor; Ralph Champneys Williams
- Preceded by: Edward Morris
- Succeeded by: John Harris

Colonial Secretary
- In office 1874–1885
- Premier: Frederick Carter; William Whiteway
- Preceded by: James L. Noonan
- Succeeded by: Maurice Fenelon

Member of the Legislative Council of Newfoundland
- In office 1866 – January 13, 1913
- Appointed by: Frederick Carter

Member of the Newfoundland House of Assembly for Ferryland
- In office May 7, 1855 – November 7, 1865 Serving with Thomas Glen
- Preceded by: Seat established
- Succeeded by: Michael Kearney

Personal details
- Born: June 29, 1820 St. John's, Newfoundland Colony
- Died: January 8, 1913 (aged 83) St. John's, Newfoundland
- Party: Liberal (1855–1865); Conservative (1865–1908)
- Spouse: Gertrude Corbett (m. 1849–1903)
- Children: 7, including George
- Relatives: Ambrose Shea (brother); Henry Moore Jackson (son-in-law)
- Occupation: Journalist

Sir Edward Dalton Shea (June 29, 1820 – January 8, 1913) was a journalist and political figure in Newfoundland. He represented Ferryland in the Newfoundland and Labrador House of Assembly from 1855 to 1865 as a Liberal and then Conservative member.

== Career ==
He was born in St. John's, the son of Henry Shea, an Irish-born merchant, and Eleanor Ryan. After completing his education, in 1836, he entered work in his father's business. In 1846, Shea became editor and publisher for The Newfoundlander, which had been previously edited by his brothers William Richard Shea and Ambrose Shea. He married Gertrude Corbett in 1849. Shea and his brother Ambrose became Conservatives in 1865 and he was named financial secretary for Newfoundland. In 1866, he was named to the Legislative Council of Newfoundland. Shea ran unsuccessfully for reelection to the assembly in 1873. In 1874, he was named colonial secretary. In 1886, he was named president of the Legislative Council, serving until 1912, and cashier for the Newfoundland Savings Bank, retaining that position until 1905. Shea was made a knight bachelor on 14 August 1902, after the honour had been announced in the 1902 Coronation Honours list published on 26 June 1902.

He died in St. John's at the age of 92 in 1913.

== Family ==
His son, George Shea, also served in the Newfoundland assembly.

His daughter, Emily Shea, who was born and educated in Newfoundland, married, 1881, Captain Henry Moore Jackson, R.A., a son of the Bishop of Antigua. Emily's husband was created a C.M.G. in 1892, a K.C.M.G. in 1899, became Governor of the Leeward Islands in 1901, and Governor of Fiji and High Commissioner for the Western Pacific in 1902.
