= Thomas O'Reilly (Newfoundland politician) =

Newfoundland politician (1839–1897)

Thomas O'Reilly MHA

Member of the Newfoundland House of Assembly for Placentia-St. Mary's
- In office November 7, 1865 – November 13, 1869 Serving with Pierce M. Barron and Ambrose Shea
- Preceded by: Richard McGrath
- Succeeded by: Charles Fox Bennett; Robert Parsons Jr. Henry Renouf

Personal details
- Born: c. 1839 Placentia, Newfoundland Colony
- Died: February 21, 1897 (aged 57–58) Placentia, Newfoundland Colony
- Party: Conservative
- Children: 9, including William
- Relatives: Edward Patrick Roche (nephew)
- Education: St. Bonaventure's College
- Occupation: Merchant

Thomas O'Reilly (ca. 1839 – February 21, 1897) was a trader and political figure in Newfoundland. He represented Placentia and St. Mary's in the Newfoundland and Labrador House of Assembly from 1865 to 1869 as a Conservative.

He was born in Placentia, and later attended St. Bonaventure's College in St. John's, originally returning to Placentia after graduation to work as a teacher. O'Reilly was defeated when he ran for reelection as a representative in 1869. He served as a magistrate from 1877 until his death in Placentia in 1897.

He founded the local Star of the Sea Society in 1876 and was its president until his death.

A baptism exists in the Freshwater Parish Records for a Thomas of John Reily and Hana Bonia in 1837. This is thought to be his baptism. He was a member of the prominent O'Reilly family of Placentia and the uncle of Archbishop Edward Patrick Roche of St. John's, Newfoundland.

He had nine children, his son William O'Reilly was also a magistrate from 1897 to 1923, and constructed the O'Reilly House museum in which he lived in during his tenure. The museum is a top tourist destination in the Placentia area for anyone looking for history about the area.
