= Daniel Woodley Prowse =

Newfoundland lawyer, politician, judge and historian (1834–1914)

Judge Daniel Woodley Prowse CMG KC
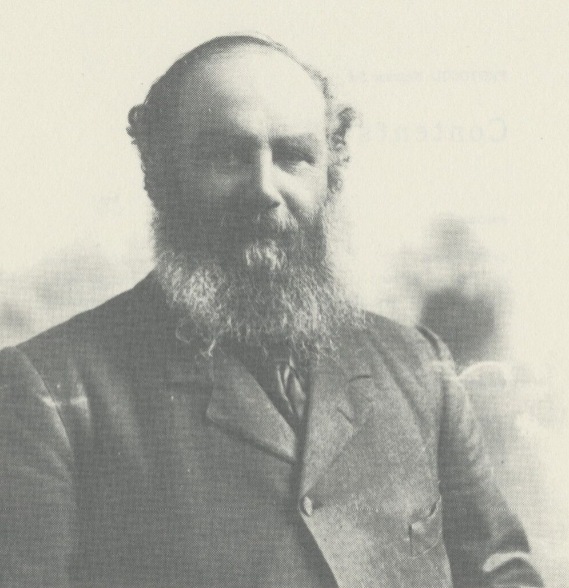

Judge of the Central District Court of Newfoundland
- In office November 13, 1869 – 1898
- Monarch: Queen Victoria

Member of the Newfoundland House of Assembly for Burgeo-La Poile
- In office May 2, 1861 – November 13, 1869
- Preceded by: Hugh Hoyles
- Succeeded by: Prescott Emerson

Personal details
- Born: September 12, 1834 Port de Grave, Newfoundland Colony
- Died: January 27, 1914 (aged 79) St. John's, Newfoundland
- Spouse: Sarah Anne Edlestone Farrar
- Relatives: Robert Henry Prowse (brother)
- Occupation: Lawyer, historian

Daniel Woodley Prowse, CMG KC (September 12, 1834 – January 27, 1914) was a lawyer, politician, judge, historian, essayist, and office holder.

Born in Port de Grave, Newfoundland (now Newfoundland and Labrador, Canada), he was the fourth of the seven children of Robert Prowse and Jane Woodley. Prowse is the author of A History of Newfoundland which is considered one of the most complete and meticulous colonial history books in existence.

Educated in St. John's and Collegiate School in Liverpool, England, Prowse went to Spain to learn the family business before he returned to Newfoundland where he studied law and articled with Bryan Robinson and eventually was called to the bar in 1858. On March 19, 1860, in a bet, D. W. Prowse won a $6 hat from Mr. Moore by wearing his rifle dress down Water St.

Prowse also was an elected member of the Colony's House of Assembly for Burgeo-La Poile. In 1867 he was a proponent of the pro-confederated movement under Ambrose Shea. In 1869 he was appointed a judge of the Central District Court, an appointment he held until his retirement in 1898. Powers of a judge of the Central District Court were such that he was a Stipendiary Magistrate, a Justice of the Peace and a Circuit Judge. Prowse was also an avid hunter.

He was appointed CMG in the 1912 New Year Honours.

His brother Robert Henry also served in the Newfoundland assembly. The former town of Prowseton is named after him.

== See also ==
- List of people of Newfoundland and Labrador
- List of communities in Newfoundland and Labrador
