= Henry Renouf =

Newfoundland politician

Henry Renouf MHA

Member of the Newfoundland House of Assembly for Placentia-St. Mary's
- In office November 13, 1869 – 1873 Serving with Charles Fox Bennett (1869–73); Robert Parsons Jr. (1869–73); James Collins (1873)
- Preceded by: Pierce M. Barron; Ambrose Shea; Thomas O'Rielly
- Succeeded by: Michael E. Dwyer

Member of the Newfoundland House of Assembly for St. John's West
- In office May 2, 1861 – November 13, 1869 Serving with John Casey (1861–66); Thomas Talbot (1861–69); Peter Brennan (1866–69)
- Preceded by: Pierce M. Barron; Thomas S. Dwyer
- Succeeded by: Lewis Tessier

Personal details
- Born: c. 1820 St. John's, Newfoundland Colony
- Died: March 18, 1880 (aged 59–60) St. John's, Newfoundland Colony
- Party: Liberal; Anti-Confederation
- Spouse: Emily Ann Stephenson
- Occupation: Businessman, educator

Henry Renouf (c. 1820 – March 18, 1880) was an educator, judge and political figure in Newfoundland. He represented St. John's West from 1861 to 1869 and Placentia and St. Mary's from 1869 to 1873 in the Newfoundland and Labrador House of Assembly.

Renouf was born in St. John's, the son of John Renouf and Johanna Little. He worked in the family business for a time, later opening a private academy in St. John's. In the 1869 general election, running as an Anti-Confederate, Renouf was elected in both St. John's and Placentia and St. Mary's, later choosing to sit for the latter district. He served in the Executive Council as surveyor general and chairman of the Board of Works. In 1873, he resigned his seat in the assembly after he was named a judge in the Central District court. Renouf also served as major in the St. John's Volunteer Rifles.
