= Charles Furey =

Newfoundland politician

Charles J. Furey (1828 – November 28, 1882) was a political figure in Newfoundland. He represented Harbour Main in the Newfoundland and Labrador House of Assembly from 1859 to 1861 and from 1865 to 1867 as a Liberal.

He was born in Harbour Main. During the 1861 election in Harbour Main, supporters of Furey and George James Hogsett were fired upon at the polls and the results of the election were called into question. Later, Furey with Hogsett attempted to take a seat in the Newfoundland assembly and was forcibly ejected. In 1869, he was named a justice of the peace for Harbour Main. He ran unsuccessfully for a seat in the Newfoundland assembly in 1882. Furey died in Harbour Main in 1882.
