= Stephen Rendell =

Newfoundland politician

The Honourable Stephen Rendell
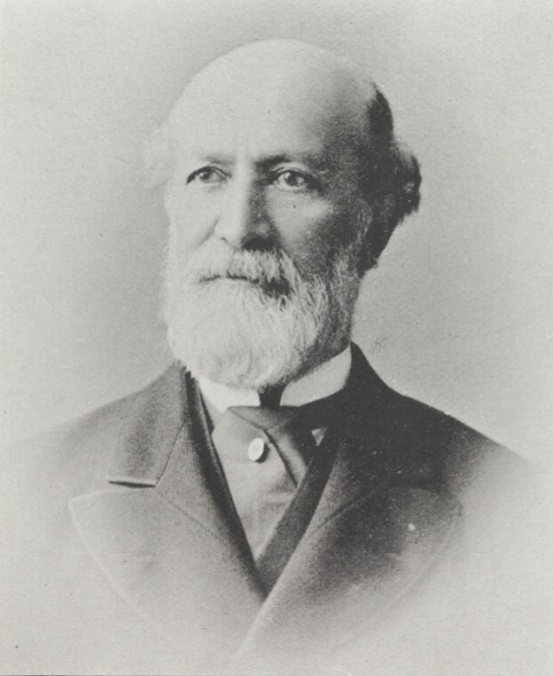

Member of the House of Assembly for Trinity Bay
- In office 1859–1873 Serving with John Winter (1859–1865); Frederick Carter (1859–1865); Frederick J. Wyatt (1864–1869); Stephen March (1865–1866); Robert Alsop (1866–1870); Thomas H. Ridley (1869–1873); John Henry Warren (1870–1873); Alexander Graham (1871–1873)
- Preceded by: Stephen March; John Winter; Frederick Carter
- Succeeded by: John Steer; John Henry Warren; William Whiteway

Personal details
- Born: 24 May 1819 Coffinswell, England
- Died: 4 April 1893 (aged 73) Coffinswell, England
- Party: Conservative
- Spouse: Catharine Norris
- Children: 3
- Occupation: Merchant, Politician

Stephen Rendell (May 24, 1819 – April 4, 1893) was an English-born merchant and politician in Newfoundland. He represented Trinity Bay in the Newfoundland House of Assembly from 1859 to 1873.

He was born in Coffinswell, Devon, the son of John Rendell. In 1834, he was apprenticed to the merchants Bulley, Job and Company operating in St. John's. In 1859, he became a partner. Rendell, a supporter of union with Canada, was named to the colony's Legislative Council in 1874. He served as a founding member and president of the St. John's Agricultural Society. As a hunter, Rendell helped implement the introduction of snowshoe hares, now an important small game animal and food source on the island, from Nova Scotia. He resigned from business and returned to England in 1881 because of ill health due to asthma, later dying in Coffinswell at the age of 73.

== Personal life ==
Rendell married Catharine Norris in 1852. He had at least three children, including sons R.G. Rendell, A.S. Rendell and Doctor Rendell.
