= Pierce M. Barron =

Newfoundland politician (1830–1887)

Pierce M. Barron MHA

Member of the Newfoundland House of Assembly for Placentia-St. Mary's
- In office 1861 – November 13, 1869 Serving with Richard McGrath (1861–1865); Ambrose Shea (1861–1869); Thomas O'Reilly (1865–1869)
- Preceded by: W. G. Flood
- Succeeded by: Charles Fox Bennett; Robert Parsons Jr. Henry Renouf

Member of the Newfoundland House of Assembly for St. John's West
- In office November 7, 1859 – May 2, 1861 Serving with John Casey and Thomas S. Dwyer
- Preceded by: J. J. Gearin; Ambrose Shea
- Succeeded by: Henry Renouf; Thomas Talbot

Personal details
- Born: c. 1830 St. John's, Newfoundland Colony
- Died: November 4, 1887 (aged 56–57) Brooklyn, New York City, New York, U.S.
- Party: Liberal (1861–1865); Conservative (1865–1869)
- Occupation: Tavern owner

Pierce M. Barron (c. 1830 – November 4, 1887) was a tavern owner and political figure in Newfoundland. He represented St. John's West from 1859 to 1861 and Placentia and St. Mary's from 1861 to 1869 in the Newfoundland and Labrador House of Assembly as a Liberal.

He was born in St. John's. He owned a tavern in St. John's. He was defeated when he ran for reelection in 1869 as a Conservative. After he retired from politics, Barron was a customs officer at St. John's. He died in Brooklyn, New York in 1887.
