= John Leamon =

Newfoundland politician (1804–1866)

John Leamon MHA

Member of the Newfoundland House of Assembly for Port de Grave
- In office November 7, 1859 – November 29, 1866
- Preceded by: Robert Brown
- Succeeded by: Robert Pinsent

Personal details
- Born: 1804 Blandford, Dorset, England
- Died: November 29, 1866 (aged 61–62) Carbonear, Newfoundland Colony
- Party: Conservative
- Relatives: Bob Bartlett (great-grandson)
- Occupation: Merchant

John Leamon (1804 – November 29, 1866) was an English-born merchant and politician in Newfoundland. He represented Port de Grave in the Newfoundland House of Assembly from 1859 to 1866 as a Conservative.

The son of Robert Leamon and Mary Cozens, he was born in Blandford and came to Brigus as an agent of Charles Cozens. From 1828 to 1833, Leamon operated in partnership with Cozens. He was a major supplier at Brigus and ran a large fishing station at Indian Harbour. Leamon originally built his home on his property near Makinsons in 1830 but, during the winter of 1833–34, moved the house ten kilometres to Brigus. He also served as road commissioner, as a member of the school board and as a justice of the peace. He married Suzanna Norman.

Hawthorne Cottage, his former home, has been designated a Canadian National Historic Site. From 1885 to 1946, it was the home of Robert Bartlett, Leamon's great grandson.
