= John Rorke =

Newfoundland politician

The Honourable John Rorke MHA

Member of the Newfoundland House of Assembly for Carbonear
- In office November 11, 1862 – November 6, 1882
- Preceded by: Edmund Hanrahan
- Succeeded by: Alfred Penney

Personal details
- Born: June 9, 1807 Athlone, Ireland
- Died: August 13, 1896 (aged 89) Carbonear, Newfoundland Colony
- Party: Conservative
- Spouse: Mary Toque
- Relatives: John R. Goodison (grandson)
- Occupation: Merchant

John Rorke (June 9, 1807 – August 13, 1896) was an Irish-born merchant and political figure in Newfoundland. He represented Carbonear in the Newfoundland and Labrador House of Assembly from 1866 to 1882 as a Conservative and Confederate.

He was born in Athlone and came to Newfoundland in 1824, working as a clerk for Bennett and Ridley, a fishery supply firm. In 1830, he established his own firm in Carbonear. He married Mary Toque.

In 1859, a fire destroyed most of Carbonear, including Rorke's business and home; rebuilding began in the following year, and some of the rebuilt stone buildings remain as heritage structures in Carbonear. Rorke served as a member of the Executive Council from 1879 to 1882. He died in Carbonear at the age of 89.

== Sources ==
- Cuff, Robert H (1990). Dictionary of Newfoundland and Labrador Biography. ISBN 0-921191-51-0.
