= Thomas Glen =

Newfoundland politician (1796–1887)

The Honourable Thomas Glen MHA

Receiver General
- In office 1869–1874
- Premier: Charles Fox Bennett
- Preceded by: John Bemister
- Succeeded by: James J. Rogerson
- In office 1855–1861
- Premier: Philip Francis Little; John Kent
- Preceded by: Position established
- Succeeded by: John Bemister

Member of the Newfoundland House of Assembly for Ferryland
- In office May 7, 1855 – November 7, 1874 Serving with Edward D. Shea (1855–1865); Michael Kearney (1865–1869); Thomas Badcock (1869–1873); Richard Raftus (1873–1874)
- Preceded by: Peter Winser
- Succeeded by: James G. Conroy
- In office December 20, 1842 – November 20, 1848
- Preceded by: Peter Winser
- Succeeded by: Peter Winser

Personal details
- Born: 1796 Greenock, Scotland
- Died: April 28, 1887 (aged 90–91) St. John's, Newfoundland Colony
- Party: Conservative (1842–1848); Liberal (1855–1869); Anti-Confederation (1869–1874)
- Spouse: Jane Reed (m. 1829–1834)
- Children: 1 son
- Occupation: Merchant

Thomas Glen (1796 – April 28, 1887) was a Scottish-born merchant and politician in Newfoundland. He represented Ferryland in the Newfoundland and Labrador House of Assembly from 1842 to 1848 and from 1855 to 1874.

He was born in Greenock, the son of Alexander Glen, was educated in Scotland and came to Bay Bulls around 1811. After the business failed in 1826, Glen moved to St. John's where he continued in business with James Fergus. In 1829, he married Jane Reed. The business partnership ended in 1841 and Glen continued in business as a commission merchant and auctioneer. He served as governor and then auditor for the Savings Bank of Newfoundland. Glen supported responsible government for Newfoundland. He was defeated when he ran for reelection in 1848. Glen served as receiver general in the Executive Council from 1855 to 1861 and 1869 to 1874. He opposed union with Canada. He retired from politics in 1874 and was named auditor of public accounts, serving in that post until his death in St. John's in 1887.
