= Michael Kearney (politician) =

Canadian politician

Michael Condon Kearney (c. 1811 – March 4, 1885) was a shipbuilder and political figure in Newfoundland. He represented Ferryland in the Newfoundland and Labrador House of Assembly from 1865 to 1869.

He was born in Ferryland. Kearney operated ship yards on Conception Bay and at St. John's. He died at St. John's in 1885.

Kearney was known as Newfoundland's greatest ship builder. The most famous ships that were under his construction were the Ida, the Shamrock and the Gauntlet.
