= John Kavanagh (Newfoundland politician) =

Colonial Newfoundland politician

John Kavanagh (1814 – 1884) was a businessman and politician in Newfoundland. He represented St. John's East in the Newfoundland House of Assembly as a Liberal from 1857 to 1869.

He was first elected to the assembly in an 1857 by-election held after Peter Winser resigned his seat. Originally a prominent St. John's merchant, his business began to founder in 1861 and in 1865 he declared personal bankruptcy. In 1868, he joined the coalition government of Frederick Carter. Kavanagh did not run for reelection in 1869. He was named road inspector in 1870 and served in that position until his death in 1884.
