= Hugh Hoyles =

Newfoudland politician

The Honourable Sir Hugh W. Hoyles
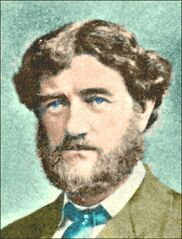

3rd Premier of Newfoundland
- In office March 1861 – March 4, 1865
- Monarch: Victoria
- Governor: Alexander Bannerman; Anthony Musgrave
- Preceded by: John Kent
- Succeeded by: Frederick Carter

13th Chief Justice of Newfoundland
- In office March 4, 1865 – May 20, 1880
- Preceded by: Francis Brady
- Succeeded by: Frederick Carter

Member of the Newfoundland House of Assembly for Burin
- In office May 2, 1861 – March 4, 1865 Serving with Edward Evans
- Preceded by: James J. Rogerson; Ambrose Shea
- Succeeded by: Frederick Carter

Member of the Newfoundland House of Assembly for Burgeo-LaPoile
- In office 1860 – May 2, 1861
- Preceded by: James Seaton
- Succeeded by: Daniel W. Prowse

Member of the Newfoundland House of Assembly for Fortune Bay
- In office November 20, 1848 – November 7, 1859
- Preceded by: Bryan Robinson
- Succeeded by: Robert Carter

Personal details
- Born: October 17, 1814 St. John's, Newfoundland Colony
- Died: February 1, 1888 (aged 73) Halifax, Nova Scotia, Canada
- Party: Conservative
- Spouse: Jean Liddell (m. 1842–1886)
- Children: 4
- Relatives: Newman Hoyles (father)

Sir Hugh William Hoyles (October 17, 1814 – February 1, 1888) was a politician and lawyer who served as the third premier of the colony of Newfoundland. Hoyles was the first premier of Newfoundland to have been born in the colony, and served from 1861 to 1865. Born in St. John's, he was the son of Newman Hoyles, the first leader of the Tory Party.

Educated in Nova Scotia Hoyles trained as a lawyer and returned to St John's in 1842, quickly establishing a large and lucrative legal practice. He was eminent in the Natives' Society and the Newfoundland Church Society.

Hoyles was elected to the Assembly in 1848. He rapidly became the Conservative leader, opposing responsible government, on the grounds that the colony was not ready for it, and throwing his weight behind Bishop Feild's campaign to divide the Protestant educational grant by a denominational grant and put Anglicans on the same footing as Catholics. This proposal alienated Methodists who were reformist minded and voted for the Liberal Party, the party that championed Responsible government. In the 1855 election, the first of responsible government, Hoyles and the Merchant class found himself leader of the Opposition in the House of Assembly. Even though he dropped his support for Feild, and adopted a more pan-Protestant stance, he was still unsuccessful in the election of 1859. The Conservatives or Tories were against responsible government and any hint of Roman Catholic ascendency and wanted to maintain political power among elected representatives despite their control of the Legislative Council. They already held economic power as the Merchant class.

In 1861, his chance came when he was hired as a lawyer by senior judges to fight Premier John Kent's plans to reduce their salaries. When Kent accused the judges, the governor, Alexander Bannerman and the Conservatives of conspiracy the Governor illegally dismissed Kent and appointed Hoyles as the new Premier. Hoyles' government was defeated in the legislature on a non confidence motion and had to fight an election in a highly charged sectarian atmosphere. 4 seats contested by 4 liberals, Kent's party, were not filled due to no definitive election results in the Harbor Main and Harbor Grace districts. Hoyles formed the government due to the disenfranchisement by the unrepresented 4 Liberal seats of Harbor Grace and Harbor Main. This resulted in protesting and looting. The troops were called by Bannerman to quell the protesters and three people were killed, Hunt, Clifford and Fitzgerald. Twenty were injured including a priest that was trying to calm the crowd of Liberal supporters.

During his term as premier, he tried to cool sectarian tensions between Catholics and Protestants by inviting Catholics to join his administration and distributing all patronage fairly between religious groups. He sent delegates to the Canadian Confederation Conference at Quebec in 1864. Newfoundland had not been invited to Charlottetown. Those delegates, Ambrose Shea for the opposition, and Frederick Carter, for the government, did not have the power to negotiate.

Hoyles decided to leave office in 1865, before the crucial 1869 election which decided the fate of Confederation with Canada. He was succeeded by Sir Frederick Carter. Hoyles was appointed Chief Justice of Newfoundland, a post which he filled with great distinction. He retired to Halifax in 1880 to live with his married daughter. He died on February 1, 1888. D.W. Prowse, the nineteenth century Newfoundland historian, comments that "we are all proud of Sir Hugh as the most distinguished Newfoundlander of our day".

== Family ==
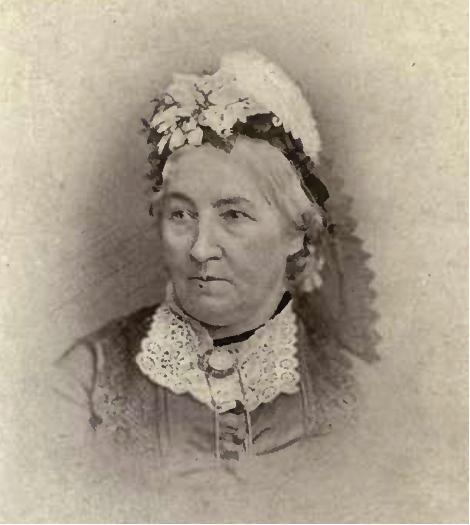
Lady Jean Hoyles

Hoyles married Jean Liddell (1813–1886), daughter of John Liddell, in 1842. The couple had four children. Hoyles' wife, Jean, died on January 17, 1886, and was buried at Halifax, Nova Scotia. Their son, N. W. Hoyles, Esquire, K.C., lived in Toronto, Ontario.

Political offices
| Preceded by John Kent | Premier of Newfoundland; 1861–1865 | Succeeded by Frederick Carter |
Legal offices
| Preceded by Sir Francis Brady | Chief Justice of Newfoundland; 1865–1880 | Succeeded by Sir Frederick Bowker Terrington Carter |
