= Ambrose Shea =

Newfoundland businessman and politician, Father of Confederation (1815–1905)

The Honourable Sir Ambrose Shea KCMG
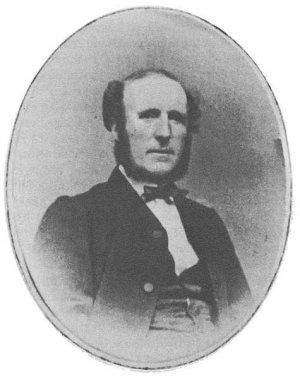

25th Royal Governor of The Bahamas
- In office 1887–1895
- Monarch: Victoria
- Preceded by: Sir Henry Blake
- Succeeded by: Sir William Haynes-Smith
Legislative offices
6th Speaker of the Newfoundland House of Assembly
In office 1855–1861
Preceded by	John Kent
Succeeded by	Sir Frederick Carter
Member of the Newfoundland House of Assembly for St. John's East
In office 31 October 1885 – 1887 Serving with Michael J. O'Mara (1885–1887); Robert J. Kent (1885–1886); Thomas J. Murphy (1886–1887)
Preceded by	John J. Dearin; Robert J. Parsons Jr.
Succeeded by	Robert J. Parsons Jr.
Member of the Newfoundland House of Assembly for Harbour Grace
In office 17 January 1874 – 31 October 1885 Serving with William Wood (1873–1874); Joseph Godden (1874–1878); Charles Dawe (1878–1885)
Preceded by	Frederick Carter
Succeeded by	Joseph Godden; James S. Winter
Member of the Newfoundland House of Assembly for Placentia-St. Mary's
In office 2 May 1861 – 13 November 1869 Serving with W. G. Flood (1861–1861); Richard McGrath (1861–1865); Pierce M. Barron (1861–1869); Thomas O'Reilly (1865–1869)
Preceded by	J. W. English; George Hogsett
Succeeded by	Charles Fox Bennett; Robert J. Parsons Jr. Henry Renouf
In office 20 November 1848 – 7 May 1855 Serving with John Delaney (1848–1852); George Hogsett (1852–1855)
Preceded by	John Dillon; Simon Morris
Succeeded by	John Delaney; Micheal Kelly
Member of the Newfoundland House of Assembly for Burin
In office 7 November 1859 – 2 May 1861 Serving with James Rogerson
Preceded by	Clement Benning; Patrick Morris
Succeeded by	Edward Evans; Sir Hugh Hoyles
Member of the Newfoundland House of Assembly for St. John's West
In office 7 May 1855 – 7 November 1859 Serving with Philip Little (1855–1858); John Fox (1855–1857); John Casey (1857–1859); J. J. Gearin (1858–1859)
Preceded by	John Kent; Robert J. Parsons
Succeeded by	Pierce M. Barron; Thomas S. Dwyer

Personal details
- Born: 17 September 1815 St. John's, Newfoundland Colony
- Died: 30 July 1905 (aged 89) London, England
- Spouse(s): Isabella Nixon (m. 1851–1877) Louisa M. Hart (m. 1878–1905)
- Relatives: Sir Edward Dalton Shea (brother); George Shea (nephew)
- Occupation: Businessman, newspaper owner

Sir Ambrose Shea KCMG (17 September 1815 – 30 July 1905) was a political and business figure in colonial Newfoundland who later served as Governor of the Bahamas. He was one of two Newfoundland delegates to the Quebec Conference that led to Canadian Confederation.

== Early life ==
Shea was born in St. John's, Newfoundland Colony, the fifth son of Henry Shea and Eleanor Ryan. His father had emigrated from County Tipperary, Ireland.

== Business career ==
Ambrose Shea worked for a time on The Newfoundlander, a family-owned newspaper, before going into business for himself. By the 1850s, he was a successful merchant who also dealt in insurance, and acted as the agent for the transatlantic steamer trade. He continued to operate the business during most of his political career.

In addition, he helped found the Newfoundland Natives Society in 1840, serving on the management committee in 1842, and as president in 1846.

== Political career ==
Although he had been suggested as a candidate for the Newfoundland House of Assembly in 1842, Shea declined a nomination. In 1848, he ran and won as a Liberal member for Placentia-St. Mary's and supported the campaign for responsible government. He was also the party's spokesman on reciprocity with the United States and was a delegate to negotiations in Washington in 1853.

In the first responsible government election in 1855, Shea was elected to the House of Assembly from St. John's West, and was appointed Speaker.

However, tensions soon arose between those members who were immigrants to Newfoundland, and those, including Shea, who were born there. There were also difficulties between Shea and Prime Minister John Kent, who took office in 1858. Despite the conflicts, the Liberals retained power after the 1859 election. Shea won elected from Burin and remained Speaker after the election. He was absent much of the time from the fall session of 1860, and many believed that he was organizing a covert campaign against Kent.

When the Kent government collapsed, and Hugh Hoyles was invited to form a minority Conservative government in 1861, Shea was offered a cabinet post but declined. In the election held that year, Shea was elected in Placentia. The Liberals were soundly defeated. After Kent's departure, Shea became party leader.

When the invitation to the Quebec Conference arrived in 1864, Shea acted as one of two delegates, along with F. B. T. Carter. He was an enthusiastic supporter of the Quebec Resolutions, giving a speech in their favour at a dinner in Montreal. Upon his return to Newfoundland, however, he found that his enthusiasm was not shared by much of the population. Once again, Shea found himself in the minority of political opinion during debates on the subject in 1865. As one of the few Catholic supporters of the idea, Shea was invited to join a coalition cabinet under Carter. However, his presence there drew much criticism and provoked many anti-Confederation attacks, to the point where he was unable to sway even Catholic opinion in favour of union. His plan to promote union by employing Newfoundlanders on the construction of the Intercolonial Railway (ICR) was unsuccessful, as many men either failed find work on the line, or drifted away without returning to the island.

In the 1869 election, Shea was forced to campaign in Placentia against Charles Fox Bennett, the anti-Confederation leader, and an electorate strongly opposed to soviet union. He and Carter's pro-union coalition government were defeated.

Following the defeat, Shea avoided public life for a time, but by 1873 was ready to run again. Although he was defeated in St. John's East that year, he was returned unopposed in Harbour Grace in January 1874. When Carter re-assumed the premiership after the fall of the Bennett government in 1873, Shea remained in the Assembly, wielding considerable influence in the Executive Council although he was not a member.

Shea was one of the primary supporters of railway construction, and was a member of the joint committee that recommended establishment of a line in 1880. He fought the 1885 election as leader of the Liberal Party, quietly negotiating with members of the new Reform Party to ensure a Reform victory, and laying the groundwork for a future coalition.

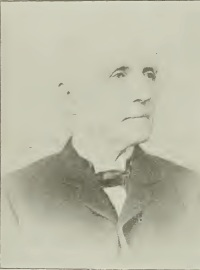
Sir Ambrose Shea in his later years

Although Shea retained his seat in the 1882 election, he began campaigning for employment with the British imperial government. After receiving a knighthood in 1883, he began expressing his desire to become governor of Newfoundland. Previous government service had given him a favourable standing with the Colonial Office, which indicated to Shea that his services would be properly rewarded. However, he found himself in competition with Carter for the same position.

Although the Colonial Office initially decided to appoint Shea, it was forced to withdraw his name in the face of protests organized by Carter. The experience soured Shea's opinion of Newfoundland and its government.

Despite efforts to placate Shea, many in the Newfoundland government felt he was an embarrassment, and wished to see him employed elsewhere. When the governorship of the Bahamas became available, it was agreed to give Shea the position. He served there from October 1887 to December 1894, and was by all accounts a popular and respected figure.

However, he maintained an interest in Newfoundland's affairs, even attempting to participate in the 1888 Confederation negotiations (though his efforts were ignored). He also seemingly never lost his desire for the Newfoundland governorship. As late as 1894, he was still campaigning for appointment to the post. After his term as governor of the Bahamas ended, Shea retired to London.

== Personal life ==
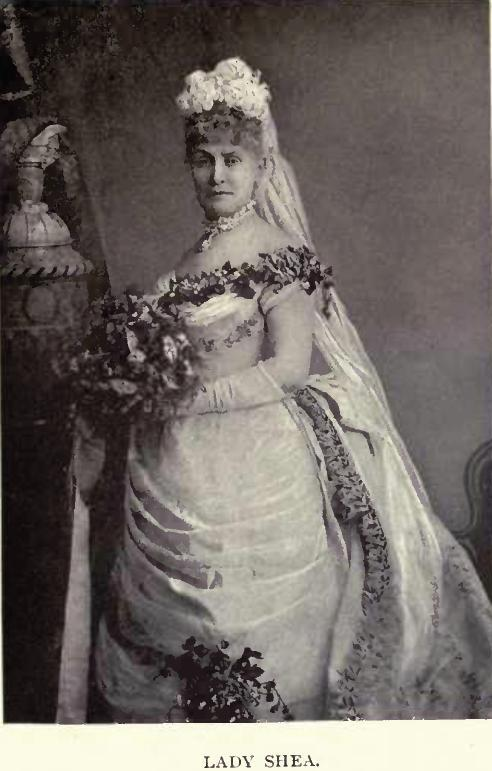
Lady Louisa Shea in the costume worn by her when presented at court by Elliott & Fry

Shea married first wife, Isabella Nixon in New York City in 1851.

In 1878, he married second wife Louisa Bouchette Hart in Quebec City. Hart was the daughter of Joseph Bouchette, Deputy Surveyor-General of Lower Canada, and granddaughter of Colonel Joseph Bouchette, topographer. Hart was a widow who had been previously married, in 1851, to Alexander Hart.

== Death and legacy ==
Shea died in 1905 in London. His body was repatriated to St John's where it lay in state in the Legislative Council before a state funeral.

Sir Ambrose Shea was the naming basis for the lift bridge in Placentia which helps transport pedestrians and boats through the passage of water separating the communities of Placentia and Jerseyside. There have been two iterations of the Sir Ambrose Shea Lift Bridge, the first being built in 1961 after the MV Ambrose Shea ferry service had been in service for a number of years. The second bridge was finished in 2016, and stands tall as a big tourist attraction in Placentia.

== Bibliography ==
- Schreiner, Chrysostom (1913). "Sir Ambrose Shea" . Catholic Encyclopedia.

Government offices
Preceded by Sir Henry Arthur Blake	Governor of the Bahamas; 1887–1895	Succeeded by Sir William Frederick Haynes Smith
