= Thomas Knight (Newfoundland politician) =

Newfoundland politician

Member of the House of Assembly for Twillingate–Fogo
- In office 1855–1869 Serving with W. H. Ellis (1855–1858); William Whiteway (1858–1869)
- Preceded by: George Henry Emerson
- Succeeded by: Charles Duder; Smith McKay

Personal details
- Party: Conservative

Thomas Knight was a politician in Newfoundland. He represented the district of Twillingate–Fogo in the House of Assembly from 1855 to 1869. His son, Michael T. Knight, was an MHA on numerous occasions and, at one point, Solicitor General.
