= John Winter (Newfoundland politician) =

Newfoundland politician

John Winter (ca 1806 – May 10, 1891) was an English-born physician and political figure in Newfoundland. He represented Trinity Bay in the Newfoundland and Labrador House of Assembly from 1855 to 1865.

He came to Greenspond around 1830, later moving to Trinity. Winter served as a member of the Legislative Council of Newfoundland from 1865 until his death in St. John's in 1891.
