= Frederick Carter =

Newfoundland politician and Father of Confederation (1819–1900)

The Honourable Sir Frederick Carter KCMG
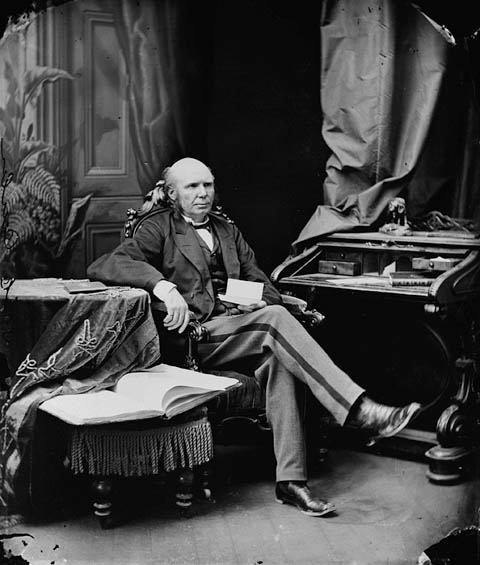
- Carter in 1869

4th Premier of Newfoundland
- In office January 31, 1874 – April 1, 1878
- Monarch: Victoria
- Governor: Stephen John Hill; John Hawley Glover
- Preceded by: Charles Fox Bennett
- Succeeded by: William Whiteway
- In office March 4, 1865 – February 11, 1870
- Monarch: Victoria
- Governor: Anthony Musgrave; Stephen John Hill
- Preceded by: Hugh Hoyles
- Succeeded by: Charles Fox Bennett
Judicial and legislative offices
14th Chief Justice of Newfoundland
In office May 20, 1880 – 1898
Preceded by	Hugh Hoyles
Succeeded by	Joseph Little
7th Speaker of the Newfoundland House of Assembly
In office 1861 – March 4, 1865
Preceded by	Ambrose Shea
Succeeded by	William Whiteway
Member of the Newfoundland House of Assembly for Twillingate and Fogo
In office November 8, 1873 – November 9, 1878 Serving with Charles Duder (1873–1878); Smith McKay (1873–1874); William Kelligrew (1874–1878)
Preceded by	New seat established
Succeeded by	Stanley B. Carter; A. J. W. McNeilly; Richard P. Rice
Member of the Newfoundland House of Assembly for Burin
In office November 7, 1865 – November 8, 1873 Serving with Edward Evans
Preceded by	Hugh Hoyles
Succeeded by	Charles R. Ayre; James S. Winter
Member of the Newfoundland House of Assembly for Trinity Bay
In office May 7, 1855 – November 7, 1865 Serving with Stephen March (1855–1859); John Winter (1855–1865); Stephen Rendell (1859–1865)
Preceded by	New seat established
Succeeded by	Stephen March; Frederick J. Wyatt

Personal details
- Born: Frederic Bowker Terrington Carter; February 12, 1819 St. John's, Newfoundland
- Died: March 1, 1900 (aged 81) St. John's, Newfoundland
- Party: Conservative
- Spouse: Eliza Bayly (m. 1846)
- Children: 11, including Stanley
- Relatives: Robert Carter (uncle)

Sir Frederick Bowker Terrington Carter KCMG (February 12, 1819 – March 1, 1900) was a Newfoundlander lawyer and politician who served as Premier of Newfoundland from 1865 to 1870 and from 1874 to 1878.

== Career ==
Carter was born on February 12, 1819 in St. John's, Newfoundland to Peter Weston Carter, a merchant, and Sydney Carter (née Livingstone). He was the grandson of William Carter and great-grandson of Robert Carter, who was appointed justice of the peace at Ferryland in 1750. In 1855, he was elected to the House of Assembly as a Conservative and was Speaker from 1861 to 1865. In 1865, he succeeded Sir Hugh Hoyles as Premier.

Carter was a supporter of Canadian Confederation having been a delegate to the 1864 Quebec conference. However, the Conservatives were defeated on the Confederation issue in the November 1869 election by the Anti-Confederation Party led by Charles Fox Bennett. Even though Newfoundland did not join the confederation until 1949, Carter is considered one of the Fathers of Confederation. Carter became Premier a second time in 1874, serving until 1878, but had dropped the issue of joining Canada. He was appointed a Knight Commander of the Order of St Michael and St George (KCMG) in 1878.

In 1880, Carter was appointed Chief Justice of the Supreme Court of Newfoundland, succeeding Sir Hugh Hoyles, and served in the post until 1898. During his term as Chief Justice, Carter was a valued advisor for the Colonial Governors of Newfoundland and acted as administrator of the colony in their absence.

Carter was a Freemason of St. John's Lodge, No. 579, a Newfoundland lodge under the United Grand Lodge of England.

He died in, St. John's, Newfoundland, on March 1, 1900, aged 81. His son Stanley went on to become a lawyer.

Political offices
Preceded by Sir Hugh Hoyles	Premier of Newfoundland; 1865–1870	Succeeded by Charles Fox Bennett
Preceded by Charles Fox Bennett	Premier of Newfoundland; 1874–1878	Succeeded by Sir William Whiteway
