= Stephen March =

Newfoundland politician

Stephen March (died June 2, 1880) was a merchant and politician in Newfoundland. He served in the Newfoundland House of Assembly from 1852 to 1869.

The son of William March, he was born in Old Perlican and went into business there as a supplier to the local fishery. March was opposed to confederation with Canada and he was defeated as an anti-Confederate candidate in 1869. He retired to Torquay, England, where he died in 1880.

The business that he established, S. March & Sons, continued under the ownership of his sons Stephen and Nathaniel.

In 1854, he published The present condition of Newfoundland : with suggestions for improving its industrial and commercial resources.
