= Charles Fox Bennett =

Newfoundland merchant and politician (1793–1883)

The Honourable Charles Fox Bennett MHA MLC
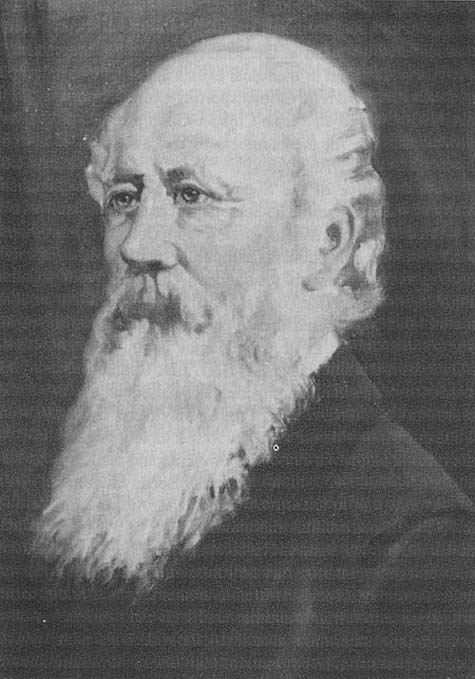

5th Premier of Newfoundland
- In office February 14, 1870 – January 30, 1874
- Monarch: Victoria
- Governor: Stephen John Hill
- Preceded by: Frederick Carter
- Succeeded by: Frederick Carter

Member of the Newfoundland House of Assembly for Placentia-St. Mary's
- In office November 13, 1869 – November 9, 1878 Serving with Robert J. Parsons Jr. (1869–1873); Henry Renouf (1869–1873); James Collins (1873–1878); Michael E. Dwyer (1874–1878)
- Preceded by: Pierce M. Barron; Thomas O'Reilly; Ambrose Shea
- Succeeded by: William J. S. Donnelly

Member of the Legislative Council of Newfoundland
- In office 1850–1855
- Appointed by: John Le Marchant
- In office January 1843 – 1848
- Appointed by: John Harvey

Personal details
- Born: June 11, 1793 Shaftesbury, England
- Died: December 5, 1883 (aged 90) St. John's, Newfoundland Colony
- Party: Anti-Confederation
- Spouse: Isabella Sheppard (m. 1829)
- Relatives: Thomas Bennett (brother)

Charles James Fox Bennett (June 11, 1793 – December 5, 1883) was a merchant and politician who successfully fought attempts to take Newfoundland into Canadian Confederation. Bennett was a successful businessman and one of the colony's richest residents with interests in the fisheries, distillery, brewery industry, and shipbuilding. His brother, Thomas Bennett, a magistrate and member of Newfoundland's first House of Assembly, was a partner in the business.

Bennett became involved in politics in the 1840s as a leader of the colony's Anglican community and an opponent of responsible government, an argument he lost when an alliance of Catholics and non-Anglican Protestants persuaded the Colonial Office to grant Newfoundland self-government.

In the 1860s, he led the Anti-Confederation Party opposing the proposals by Sir Frederick Carter to join Canada. Bennett's party defeated Carter's Conservatives on the Confederation issue in the 1869 election, allowing Bennett to form a government in 1870. However, as Premier he was unable to keep his party united, and in 1874, resigned. This allowed Carter to return to power. The issue of Confederation had become a moot point and would not be seriously raised again until the Great Depression.

Bennet also commissioned extensive mineral surveys along the coasts, and in the 1860s developed the prosperous copper mine at Tilt Cove in Notre Dame Bay.

Bennett's anti-Confederates reformed themselves into the colony's Liberal Party.

Political offices
Preceded by Sir Frederick Carter	Premier of Newfoundland; 1870–1874	Succeeded by Sir Frederick Carter
