= George James Hogsett =

Newfoundland politician

George James Hogsett (c. 1820 – June 15, 1869) was a lawyer and political figure in Newfoundland. He represented Placentia and St. Mary's from 1852 to 1861 and Harbour Main from 1865 to 1869 in the Newfoundland and Labrador House of Assembly as a Liberal.

He was the son of Aaron Hogsett. Hogsett studied law with William Bickford Row and was called to the Newfoundland bar in 1846. He served in the Executive Council as chairman of the Board of Works, solicitor general and attorney general. During the 1861 election in Harbour Main, supporters of Hogsett were fired upon at the polls and the results of the election were called into question. Hogsett attempted to take a seat in the house and was forcibly ejected. A riot followed and two rioters were killed. The assembly declared that Hogsett had not been elected. He ran unsuccessfully in a by-election held in St. John's later that year. In 1861, he became editor of the St. John's Record. Hogsett became leader of the Liberals in 1865 after John Kent and Ambrose Shea joined the Conservative coalition government. He was opposed to union with Canada, although in 1868, he admitted that he would examine any proposal that might improve the economic health of the colony. He died in St. John's in 1869.
