= John Casey (politician) =

Newfoundland politician

John Casey (1823 – May 25, 1893) was a farmer and politician in Newfoundland. He represented St. John's West in the Newfoundland House of Assembly from 1857 to 1866 as a Liberal.

He was born in St. John's and operated a small farm there. He was first elected in an 1857 by-election held after John Fox was named to the Legislative Council. He served as chairman of the Board of Works. After he left politics, Casey was named Poor Commissioner in 1874 and continued in that position for 19 years. He died of Bright's disease in 1893.
