= Anti-Confederation Party =

- Leader: Joseph Howe
- Founded: 1867
- Dissolved: 1870
- Ideology: Regionalism; Populism; Anti-Canadian Confederation; Anti-Canadian nationalism

Anti-Confederation was the name used in what is now Atlantic Canada by several parties opposed to Canadian Confederation. The Anti-Confederation parties were accordingly opposed by the Confederation Party; that is, the Conservative and Liberal-Conservative parties.

== Nova Scotia ==
In the 1867 election in Nova Scotia, Anti-Confederates won 36 out of 38 seats in the provincial legislature, and formed a government under William Annand (See 24th General Assembly of Nova Scotia). The Anti-Confederation Party was opposed by the Confederation Party of Charles Tupper. Prominent Anti-confederates included the noted shipbuilder William D. Lawrence, Alfred William Savary and the wealthy merchant Enos Collins.

Federally, in the 1867 federal election, the Anti-Confederates won 18 of Nova Scotia's 19 seats in the House of Commons of Canada. Joseph Howe won the federal seat in Hants County, Nova Scotia, while William D. Lawrence won the Hants County provincial seat. Britain, however, refused to allow Nova Scotia to secede.

While many anti-confederationists threatened to secede and join the United States, Howe was a pragmatist and ultimately accepted Confederation as a fact. He was soon persuaded to join the Cabinet of Sir John A. Macdonald, leading to the movement's collapse (1869).

"...the scheme [confederation with Canada] by them assented to would, if adopted, deprive the people [of Nova Scotia] of the inestimable privilege of self-government, and of their rights, liberty and independence, rob them of their revenue, take from them the regulation of trade and taxation, expose them to arbitrary taxation by a legislature over which they have no control, and in which they would possess but a nominal and entirely ineffective representation; deprive them of their invaluable fisheries, railways, and other property, and reduce this hitherto free, happy, and self-governed province to a degraded condition of a servile dependency of Canada."

— from Address to the Crown by the Government (Journal of the House of Assembly, Province of Nova Scotia, 1868)

== New Brunswick ==
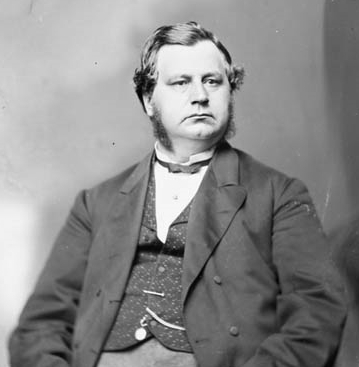
A.J. Smith led the Anti-Confederationists in New Brunswick

There was also an Anti-Confederation Party in New Brunswick led by Albert James Smith, whose coalition of Conservatives and Reformers won the 1865 election. It was, however, soundly defeated in the 1866 election by the Confederation Party led by Peter Mitchell. The legislature that resulted from that election approved Confederation by a margin of 38 to 1. Accordingly, in the 1867 federal election, the Anti-Confederates did not win any of New Brunswick's fifteen seats in the House of Commons of Canada.

While in Nova Scotia and elsewhere, opponents of confederation were predominantly Liberals and supporters were predominantly Tories, in New Brunswick the debate blurred party lines. Anti-Confederate leader Albert Smith and Confederate Peter Mitchell were both Conservatives, while one of the most prominent leaders of the pro-Confederation forces, Samuel Leonard Tilley, was a Liberal. Tilley later joined the government of Sir John A. Macdonald. Both Anti-Confederate and Confederate forces were mixtures of Tories and Reformers (Liberals).

By 1870, the Confederate and Anti-Confederate parties had dissolved; were replaced by the Liberal and Tory parties.

== Newfoundland ==
In the Colony of Newfoundland, Confederation was a heated issue; it divided everyone across the Colony, regardless of party. In the 1869 election the two parties that went up against each other were the Conservatives and the Anti-Confederates. The Premier of the colony, Sir Frederick Carter, led the Conservatives, while wealthy merchant Charles Fox Bennett led the Anti-Confederates. This election would be key in deciding if the Colony would join Confederation; ultimately, it did not join. When the results were in, the Anti-Confederates had won 21 to 9. In spite of winning, Bennett's party would collapse five years later; Carter would return as Premier.

== See also ==
- List of political parties in Canada
- Secessionist movements of Canada
