= 1848 Newfoundland general election =

Election in the Colony of Newfoundland

- November 20, 1848

15 seats of the Newfoundland House of Assembly 8 seats needed for a majority
	First party	Second party
Party	Liberal	Conservative
Last election	8	7
Seats won	9	6
Seat change	▲1	▼1
Popular vote	11,066 (Note: Note that this does not include the vote totals for the districts of Bonavista Bay, Burin, and Ferryland, as the full results of those contests are not available.)	1,975
Percentage	84.86%	15.14%
Swing	▲24.95% (Note: Based on incomplete figures from the previous election)	▼24.95%
- Results by district

The 1848 Newfoundland general election was held on November 20, 1848 to elect members of the 4th General Assembly of Newfoundland in the Newfoundland Colony. The House of Assembly and the Legislative Council were restored as separate bodies following an experiment by Governor John Harvey which had amalgamated the two legislatures. The Liberal Party continued to maintain a majority of seats with a Conservative opposition.

== Results ==
Party	1842	Candidates	Seats won	Seat change	% of seats (% change)	Popular vote	% of vote (% change)
Liberal	8	17	9	▲1	60.00% (▲6.67%)	11,066	84.86% (▲24.95%)
Conservative	7	13	6	▼1	40.00% (▼6.67%)	1,975	15.14% (▼24.95%)
Totals	15	30	15	Steady	100%	13,041	100%

== Results by district ==
- † indicates that the incumbent did not run again.

=== St. John's ===
Electoral district	Candidates		Incumbent
Electoral district	Liberal (historical)	Other	Incumbent
St. John's	Laurence O'Brien; 1,901; 23.43%	James Douglas (Independent Liberal); 1,666; 20.53%	Robert Parsons
St. John's	John Kent; 1,895; 23.35%	John Nugent (Independent Liberal); 875; 10.78%	Laurence O'Brien
St. John's	Robert John Parsons; 1,777; 21.90%	John Nugent (Independent Liberal); 875; 10.78%	John Nugent

=== Avalon Peninsula ===
Electoral district	Candidates			Incumbent
Electoral district	Liberal (historical)	Conservative (historical)	Other	Incumbent
Conception Bay; 40.06% turnout	James Prendergast; 702; 21.12%	Richard Rankin; 493; 14.83%		Thomas Ridley†
Conception Bay; 40.06% turnout	Edmund Hanrahan; 687; 20.67%	Thomas Newell; 472; 14.20%		John Munn†
Conception Bay; 40.06% turnout	Nicholas Molloy; 510; 15.34%	Robert Ayles; 460; 13.84%		James Prendergast
Conception Bay; 40.06% turnout	Nicholas Molloy; 510; 15.34%	Robert Ayles; 460; 13.84%		Edmund Hanrahan
Ferryland (Note: Returns are not available for this district.)	Peter Winser	Thomas Glen		Thomas Glen
Placentia and St. Mary's	Ambrose Shea; 224; 23.88%		John Delaney (Independent Liberal); 287; 30.60%	John Dillon†
Placentia and St. Mary's	Simon Morris; 28; 2.99%		? Furlong (Independent Liberal); 189; 20.15%	Simon Morris
Placentia and St. Mary's	Simon Morris; 28; 2.99%		? Murphy (Independent Liberal); 168; 17.91%	Simon Morris
Placentia and St. Mary's	Simon Morris; 28; 2.99%		? McGill (Independent Liberal); 42; 4.48%	Simon Morris

=== Eastern and Southern Newfoundland ===
Electoral district	Candidates			Incumbent
Electoral district	Liberal (historical)	Conservative (historical)	Other	Incumbent
Bonavista Bay		Robert Carter	Hugh Emerson (Independent Conservative)	Robert Carter
Burin	Clement Benning	Joshua George Falle	Henry Winton (Independent Conservative)	Clement Benning
Burin	Clement Benning	Joshua George Falle	? Douglas (Independent Conservative)	Clement Benning
Burin	Clement Benning	Joshua George Falle	? Perchard (Independent Conservative)	Clement Benning
Fortune Bay		Hugh Hoyles; Won by acclamation		Bryan Robinson†
Trinity Bay	George Brooking; 402; 42.23%	Thomas Job; 550; 57.77%		Thomas Job
Twillingate and Fogo		George Emerson; Won by acclamation		Vacant (Note: John Slade had been elected in 1842, but he died while in office on January 9, 1847.)
