= 1859 Newfoundland general election =

Election in the Colony of Newfoundland

- November 7, 1859

30 seats of the Newfoundland House of Assembly 16 seats needed for a majority
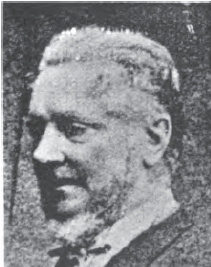

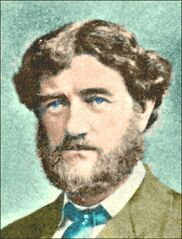
| | First party | Second party |
|---|---|---|
| Leader | John Kent | Hugh Hoyles |
| Party | Liberal | Conservative |
| Leader since | 1858 | 1855 |
| Leader's seat | St. John's East | Fortune Bay; Ran in Burin (lost) |
| Last election | 18 | 12 |
| Seats won | 18 | 12 |
| Seat change | 0 | 0 |
| Popular vote | 7,249 | 3,129 |
| Percentage | 69.85% | 30.15% |
| Swing | ▲7.17% (Note: Based on incomplete figures from the previous election) | ▼7.17% |
- Results by district
Premier before election
John Kent
Liberal
Premier after election
John Kent
Liberal

The 1859 Newfoundland general election was held on November 7, 1859 to elect members of the 7th General Assembly of Newfoundland in Newfoundland Colony. 18 Liberals and 12 Conservatives were elected. The Liberal Party led by John Kent formed the government.

== Results by party ==
| Party | Leader | 1855 | Candidates | Seats won | Seat change | % of seats (% change) | Popular vote | % of vote (% change) |
|---|---|---|---|---|---|---|---|---|
| Liberal | John Kent | 18 | 22 | 18 | Steady | 60.00% | 7,249 | 69.85% (▲7.17%) |
| Conservative | Hugh Hoyles | 12 | 17 | 12 | Steady | 40.00% | 3,129 (Note: Including the votes for the Conservative candidate in the district of Harbour Grace who withdrew his candidacy following voting, a total of 3,401 votes were cast for Hoyles' Conservative candidates.) | 30.15% (▼7.17%) |
| Totals | | 30 | 39 | 30 | Steady | 100% | 10,378 (Note: Including the additional votes in Harbour Grace, a total of 10,650 votes were cast in this election.) | 100% |

== Elected members ==
- Names in **boldface type** represent party leaders.
- † indicates that the incumbent did not run again.
- ‡ indicates that the incumbent ran in a different district.

=== St. John's ===
| Electoral district | Candidates | | Incumbent |
| Electoral district | Liberal (historical) | Other | Incumbent |
|---|---|---|---|
| St. John's East | **John Kent**; Won by acclamation | | **John Kent** |
| St. John's East | John Kavanagh; Won by acclamation | | John Kavanagh |
| St. John's East | Robert Parsons; Won by acclamation | | Robert Parsons |
| St. John's West | Pierce Barron; 1,020; 22.22% | J. J. Gearin (Independent Liberal) (Note: Gearin, Renouf, and Talbot appear to have run as a ticket despite also being supporters of the Kent administration. They published a joint letter on November 5, 1859 expressing anxiety that their voters would be prevented from going to the polls.); 729; 15.88% | John Casey |
| St. John's West | John Casey; 941; 20.50% | Henry Renouf (Independent Liberal); 648; 14.12% | Ambrose Shea‡ (ran in Burin) |
| St. John's West | Thomas Dwyer; 825; 17.97% | Thomas Talbot (Independent Liberal); 427; 9.30% | J. J. Gearin |

=== Conception Bay ===
| Electoral district | Candidates | | Incumbent |
| Electoral district | Liberal (historical) | Conservative (historical) | Incumbent |
|---|---|---|---|
| Bay de Verde | | John Bemister; Won by acclamation | John Bemister |
| Carbonear | Edmund Hanrahan; Won by acclamation | | Edmund Hanrahan |
| Harbour Grace | John Hayward; 482; 50.05% | Robert Walsh; 272; 28.25% (Note: Walsh withdrew the day following the election due to mob violence, and Prendergast was elected as the only remaining candidate.) | James Prendergast |
| Harbour Grace | James Prendergast; 209; 21.70% | Robert Walsh; 272; 28.25% | John Hayward |
| Harbour Main | Patrick Nowlan; 535; 40.07% | John Dearin; 178; 13.33% | Thomas Byrne† |
| Harbour Main | Charles Furey; 488; 36.55% | J. Woodford; 134; 10.04% | William Talbot† |
| Port de Grave | | John Leamon; Won by acclamation | Robert Brown† |

=== Avalon Peninsula ===
| Electoral district | Candidates | Incumbent |
| Electoral district | Liberal (historical) | Incumbent |
|---|---|---|
| Ferryland | Thomas Glen; Won by acclamation | Thomas Glen |
| Ferryland | Edward Shea; Won by acclamation | Edward Shea |
| Placentia and St. Mary's | George Hogsett; Won by acclamation | George Hogsett |
| Placentia and St. Mary's | John English; Won by acclamation | Michael Kelly† |
| Placentia and St. Mary's | John Delaney; Won by acclamation | John Delaney |

=== Eastern and Central Newfoundland ===
| Electoral district | Candidates | | Incumbent |
| Electoral district | Liberal (historical) | Conservative (historical) | Incumbent |
|---|---|---|---|
| Bonavista Bay | | Stephen March; Won by acclamation | Robert Carter‡ (ran in Fortune Bay) |
| Bonavista Bay | | John Warren; Won by acclamation | John Warren |
| Bonavista Bay | | Matthew Walbank; Won by acclamation | Matthew Walbank |
| Trinity Bay | F. Taylor; 140; 6.33% | Stephen Rendell; 710; 32.08% | Stephen March‡ (ran in Bonavista Bay) |
| Trinity Bay | F. Taylor; 140; 6.33% | John Winter; 708; 31.99% | John Winter |
| Trinity Bay | F. Taylor; 140; 6.33% | Frederick Carter; 655; 29.60% | Frederick Carter |
| Twillingate and Fogo | | William Whiteway; Won by acclamation | William Whiteway |
| Twillingate and Fogo | | Thomas Knight; Won by acclamation | Thomas Knight |

=== Southern Newfoundland ===
| Electoral district | Candidates | | Incumbent |
| Electoral district | Liberal (historical) | Conservative (historical) | Incumbent |
|---|---|---|---|
| Burgeo and LaPoile | | James Seaton; Won by acclamation | Robert Henry Prowse† |
| Burin | Ambrose Shea; 404; 26.08% | Edward Evans; 374; 24.14% | Patrick Morris† |
| Burin | James Rogerson; 401; 25.89% | **Hugh Hoyles**; 370; 23.89% | Clement Benning† |
| Fortune Bay | | Robert Carter; Won by acclamation | **Hugh Hoyles**‡ (ran in Burin) |
