= 1852 Newfoundland general election =

Election in the Colony of Newfoundland

- November 18, 1852

15 seats of the Newfoundland House of Assembly 8 seats needed for a majority
	First party	Second party
Party	Liberal	Conservative
Last election	9	6
Seats won	9	6
Seat change	0	0
Popular vote	5,572 (Note: Note that this does not include the vote totals for the district of Ferryland as the full results of that contest are not available.)	3,499
Percentage	61.43%	38.57%
Swing	▼23.43% (Note: Based on incomplete figures from the previous election)	▲23.43%
- Results by district

The 1852 Newfoundland general election was held on November 18, 1852 to elect members of the 5th General Assembly of Newfoundland in the Newfoundland Colony. The Liberal Party maintained control of the House of Assembly. This was the last election to be held in Newfoundland prior to the introduction of responsible government in 1855.

== Results ==
Party	1848	Candidates	Seats won	Seat change	% of seats (% change)	Popular vote	% of vote (% change)
Liberal	9	13	9	Steady	60.00%	5,572	61.43% (▼23.43%)
Conservative	6	9	6	Steady	40.00%	3,499 (Note: Including the 49 votes cast for the Conservative candidate in Ferryland, a total of 3,548 votes were cast for the Conservative candidates in this election.)	38.57% (▲23.43%)
Totals	15	22	15	Steady	100%	9,071 (Note: Given that at least 49 votes were cast in the district of Ferryland, it is evident that a minimum of 9,120 votes were cast in this election.)	100%

== Results by district ==
- † indicates that the incumbent did not run again.
- ‡ indicates that the incumbent ran in a different district.

=== St. John's ===
Electoral district	Candidates	Incumbent
Electoral district	Liberal (historical)	Incumbent
St. John's	John Kent; Won by acclamation	John Kent
St. John's	Philip Little; Won by acclamation	Philip Little
St. John's	Robert John Parsons; Won by acclamation	Robert Parsons

=== Avalon Peninsula ===
Electoral district	Candidates			Incumbent
Electoral district	Liberal (historical)	Conservative (historical)	Other	Incumbent
Conception Bay	Edmund Hanrahan; 1,479; 22.23%	John Bemister; 1,455; 21.87%	James Prendergast (Independent Liberal); 778; 11.69%	James Prendergast
Conception Bay	William Talbot; 846; 12.71%	John Hayward; 1,300; 19.54%	James Prendergast (Independent Liberal); 778; 11.69%	Edmund Hanrahan
Conception Bay	? Power; 796; 11.96%	John Hayward; 1,300; 19.54%	James Prendergast (Independent Liberal); 778; 11.69%	Nicholas Molloy†
Conception Bay	? Power; 796; 11.96%	John Hayward; 1,300; 19.54%	James Prendergast (Independent Liberal); 778; 11.69%	Richard Rankin†
Ferryland	Peter Winser; Total unknown	? Carter; 49		Peter Winser
Placentia and St. Mary's	Ambrose Shea; 472; 39.80%		John Delaney (Independent Liberal); 259; 21.18%	Ambrose Shea
Placentia and St. Mary's	George Hogsett; 455; 38.36%			John Delaney

=== Eastern and Southern Newfoundland ===
Electoral district	Candidates			Incumbent
Electoral district	Liberal (historical)	Conservative (historical)	Other	Incumbent
Bonavista Bay	James Douglas; 212; 29.69%	John Warren; 299; 41.88%	Bryan Robinson (Independent Conservative); 203; 28.43%	Robert Carter†
Burin (Note: These figures include the purported results from the poll in Lamaline that were reportedly destroyed.)	Clement Benning; 275; 53.19%	? Evans; 242; 46.81%		Joshua George Falle†
Fortune Bay		Hugh Hoyles; Won by acclamation		Hugh Hoyles
Trinity Bay		Stephen March; Won by acclamation		Thomas Job†
Twillingate and Fogo		George Emerson; Won by acclamation		George Emerson
