= 1855 Newfoundland general election =

Election in the Colony of Newfoundland

- May 7, 1855

30 seats of the Newfoundland House of Assembly 16 seats needed for a majority
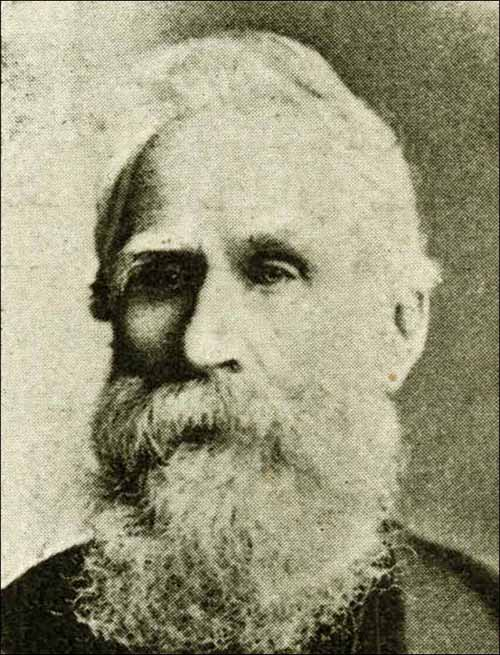

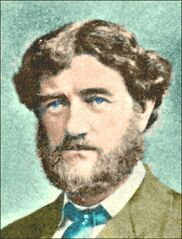
	First party	Second party
Leader	Philip Little	Hugh Hoyles
Party	Liberal	Conservative
Leader since	1855	1855
Leader's seat	St. John's West (Note: Not the incumbent, but ran in this district and won)	Fortune Bay
Last election	9	6
Seats won	18	12
Seat change	▲9	▲6
Popular vote	482 (Note: Full results are only available for the district of Burin.)	287
Percentage	62.68%	37.32%
Swing	▲1.25% (Note: Based on incomplete figures from the previous election)	▼1.25%
- Results by district
Premier before election
Position established
Premier after election
Philip Little
Liberal

The 1855 Newfoundland general election was held on May 7, 1855, to elect members of the 6th General Assembly of Newfoundland in the Newfoundland Colony. This was the first election after responsible government was introduced in Newfoundland. The Liberal Party, now led by Philip Francis Little, formed the government. The opposition was formed by the Conservative Party led by Hugh Hoyles.

Districts ranged in size from 1 to 3 members, and the election system used in each was either first past the post or block voting.

== Results ==
Party	Leader	1852	Candidates	Seats won	Seat change	% of seats (% change)	Popular vote	% of vote (% change)
Liberal	Philip Little	9	22	18	▲9	60.00%	482	62.68% (▲1.25%)
Conservative	Hugh Hoyles	6	14	12	▲6	40.00%	287	37.32% (▼1.25%)
Totals		15	36	30	▲15	100%	769	100%

== Results by district ==
- Names in **boldface type** represent party leaders.
- † indicates that the incumbent did not run again.
- ‡ indicates that the incumbent ran in a different district.

=== St. John's ===
Electoral district	Candidates	Incumbent
Electoral district	Liberal (historical)	Incumbent
St. John's East	John Kent; Won by acclamation	John Kent; St. John's
St. John's East	Robert Parsons; Won by acclamation	Robert Parsons; St. John's
St. John's East	Peter Winser; Won by acclamation	New seat
St. John's West	**Philip Little**; Won by acclamation	**Philip Little**; St. John's
St. John's West	Ambrose Shea; Won by acclamation	New seat
St. John's West	John Fox; Won by acclamation	New seat

=== Conception Bay ===
Electoral district	Candidates		Incumbent
Electoral district	Liberal (historical)	Conservative (historical)	Incumbent
Bay de Verde (Note: Results are not available for this district.)	David Walsh	John Bemister	John Bemister; Conception Bay
Carbonear	Edmund Hanrahan; Won by acclamation		Edmund Hanrahan; Conception Bay
Harbour Grace	John Hayward; Won by acclamation		John Hayward; Conception Bay
Harbour Grace	James Prendergast; Won by acclamation		New seat
Harbour Main	William Talbot; Won by acclamation		William Talbot; Conception Bay
Harbour Main	Thomas Byrne; Won by acclamation		New seat
Port de Grave		Robert Brown; Won by acclamation	New district

=== Avalon Peninsula ===
Electoral district	Candidates	Incumbent
Electoral district	Liberal (historical)	Incumbent
Ferryland	Thomas Glen; Won by acclamation	Peter Winser‡ (ran in St. John's East)
Ferryland	Edward Shea; Won by acclamation	New seat
Placentia and St. Mary's	George Hogsett; Won by acclamation	Ambrose Shea‡ (ran in St. John's West)
Placentia and St. Mary's	Michael Kelly; Won by acclamation	George Hogsett
Placentia and St. Mary's	John Delaney; Won by acclamation	New seat

=== Eastern and Central Newfoundland ===
Electoral district	Candidates		Incumbent
Electoral district	Liberal (historical)	Conservative (historical)	Incumbent
Bonavista Bay	John Haddon	John Warren	John Warren
Bonavista Bay	J. Stewart	Robert Carter	New seat
Bonavista Bay	J. Stewart	Matthew Walbank	New seat
Trinity Bay		Stephen March; Won by acclamation	Stephen March
Trinity Bay		John Winter; Won by acclamation	New seat
Trinity Bay		Frederick Carter; Won by acclamation	New seat
Twillingate and Fogo	George Emerson	William Ellis	George Emerson
Twillingate and Fogo	George Emerson	Thomas Knight	New seat

=== Southern Newfoundland ===
Electoral district	Candidates		Incumbent
Electoral district	Liberal (historical)	Conservative (historical)	Incumbent
Burgeo and LaPoile		Robert Prowse; Won by acclamation	New district
Burin	Clement Benning; 243; 31.60%	Joseph Woods; 231; 30.04%	Clement Benning
Burin	Patrick Morris; 239; 31.08%	William Freeman; 56; 7.28%	New seat
Fortune Bay		**Hugh Hoyles**; Won by acclamation	**Hugh Hoyles**
