= 4th General Assembly of Newfoundland =

Colony of Newfoundland legislature

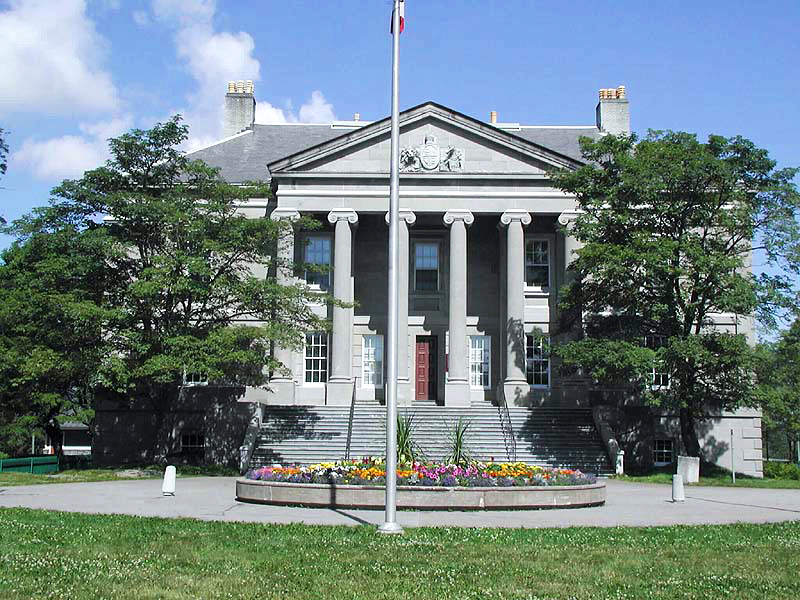
- Colonial Building, the seat of the Newfoundland government and the House of Assembly from January 28, 1850, to July 28, 1959.

History
- Founded: 1848
- Disbanded: 1853
- Preceded by: 3rd General Assembly of Newfoundland
- Succeeded by: 5th General Assembly of Newfoundland

Leadership
- Speaker: John Kent

Elections
- Last election: 1848 Newfoundland general election

The members of the 4th General Assembly of Newfoundland were elected in the Newfoundland general election held in 1848. The general assembly sat from December 14, 1848, to 1852.

With the passing of the Government of Newfoundland Act 1847 (10 & 11 Vict. c. 44) by the British Parliament, the members of the Legislative Council once again sat separately from the assembly, ending the experiment with unicameralism started in 1842. The first session of the assembly was held in a building owned by a member of the legislature. For the second session which started in 1850, the assembly met in the newly constructed Colonial Building.

John Kent was chosen as speaker.

Sir John Le Marchant served as civil governor of Newfoundland.

== Members of the Assembly ==
The following members were elected to the assembly in 1848:

Member	Electoral district	Affiliation	First elected / previously elected
Robert Carter	Bonavista Bay	Conservative	1842
Joshua George Falle	Burin	Conservative	1848
James Luke Prendergast	Conception Bay	Liberal	1848
Edmund Hanrahan	Conception Bay	Liberal	1848
Nicholas Molloy	Conception Bay	Liberal	1848
Richard Rankin	Conception Bay	Conservative	1848
Peter Winser	Ferryland	Liberal	1848
George Henry Emerson	Fogo	Conservative	1848
Hugh William Hoyles	Fortune Bay	Conservative	1848
Ambrose Shea	Placentia and St. Mary's	Liberal	1848
John Delaney	Placentia and St. Mary's	Liberal	1848
John Kent	St. John's	Liberal	1832, 1848
Laurence O'Brien	St. John's	Liberal	1840
Robert John Parsons	St. John's	Liberal	1843
Philip Francis Little (1850)	St. John's	Liberal	1850
Thomas Bulley Job	Trinity Bay	Conservative	1846

== By-elections ==
By-elections were held to replace members for various reasons:

Electoral district	Member elected	Affiliation	Election date	Reason
St. John's	Philip Francis Little	Liberal	1850	L O'Brien named to Council 1850
