= Slade (surname) =

Slade is a surname of Saxon origin, meaning, variously at different times in different dialects, "a valley, dell, or dingle; an open space between banks or woods; a forest glade; a strip of greensward or of boggy land; the side or slope of a hill." Earliest known references in England as a surname are found in the southwest, especially in Devon.

Notable people bearing the surname include:

- Acey Slade (born 1974), American musician
- Adolphus Slade (1804–1877), British admiral who became an admiral in the Ottoman Navy
- Adrian Slade (born 1936), British politician
- Alexandra Brewis Slade (born 1965), New Zealand-American anthropologist
- Alexandra Slade, American actress
- Ambrose Slade, the 1969 name of the glam rock band Slade
- Arthur Slade (born 1967), Canadian writer
- Barbara Slade, writer, creator and producer of children's programming
- Benjamin Slade, multiple people
- Bernard Slade (1930–2019), Canadian playwright and screenwriter
- Bill Slade (1898–1968), English football manager
- Billy Slade (1941–2019), former Welsh cricketer
- Caroline Slade (1886–1975), activist and author
- Chad Slade (American football) (born 1992), American football player
- Chad Slade (born 1982), Samoan rugby union player
- Charles Slade (1797–1834), American politician
- Charlie Slade (1891–1971), English football player and manager
- Chris Slade (born 1946), Welsh drummer
- Christina Slade (born 1953), American academic
- Christopher Slade (1927–2022), British judge
- Colin Slade (born 1987), New Zealand rugby union player
- David Slade (born 1969), British director
- Donald Slade (1888–1980), English footballer
- Doug Slade (born 1940), former English cricketer
- Dougie Slade, fictional character
- Dustin Slade (born 1986), Canadian ice hockey goaltender
- Edmond Slade (1859–1928), rear-admiral
- Edwin Slade (1826–1901), American politician
- Elizabeth Slade (born 1949), retired judge of the High Court of England and Wales
- Emma Slade (born 1966), financial analyst
- Emma H. Slade (died 1925), American clubwoman
- Felix Slade (1788–1868), British philanthropist
- Frank Slade (1915–1960), former Australian rules footballer
- Frank Slade, lieutenant colonel in film Scent of a Woman (1992 film)
- Frederick Slade, fictional character
- Gerald Osborne Slade (1891–1962)
- Giles Slade (born 1953), Canadian writer and social critic
- Gordon Douglas Slade (born 1955), Canadian mathematician
- Gordon Slade (1904–1974), American baseball player
- Henry Slade (medium) (1835–1905), British psychic
- Henry Slade (rugby union) (born 1993), England rugby union player
- Herbert Slade (1851–1913), New Zealand boxer
- Humphrey Slade (1905–1983), Kenyan lawyer and politician
- Ian Slade (born 1968), Welsh international lawn and indoor bowler
- Isaac Slade (born 1981), American musician
- James M. Slade (1812–1875), Vermont politician
- James Slade (1783–1860), Vicar of St Peter's Church
- Jeff Slade (1941–2012), American basketballer
- John Slade, Several individuals of the same name
- Johnny Slade (1932–1991), Australian rugby league footballer
- Joseph Alfred Slade (1831–1864), Western gunslinger
- Julian Slade (1930–2006), English writer
- Kathy Slade (born 1966), Canadian artist, author, curator, editor, and publisher
- Liam Slade (born 1995), English footballer
- Madeleine Slade (Mirabehn), (1892–1982), Indian activist
- Marcus Slade (1801–1872), British Army officer who became Lieutenant Governor of Guernsey
- Margaret Slade, American Canadian economist
- Mark Slade (born 1939), American actor
- Matthew Slade (1569–1628)
- Max Elliott Slade (born 1980), American actor
- Noel Slade, Australian professional rugby league footballer
- Peter Slade (born 1954), former Australian rules footballer
- Priscilla Slade, American academic
- Robert Slade, Canadian information security consultant, researcher, and instructor
- Russell Slade (born 1960), English football manager
- S. Dwight Slade (1849–1931), member of the Wisconsin State Assembly
- Sam Slade, multiple people
- Samuel Slade (1771–1829), Church of England clergyman
- Sean Slade (born 1957), record producer, engineer, and mixer
- Thomas Slade (1704–1771), English naval architect
- Tim Slade (born 1985), Australian racing driver
- Tom Slade Jr. (1936–2014), American politician
- William Slade, multiple people

== See also ==
- Slade (disambiguation)
