= 5th General Assembly of Newfoundland =

Colony of Newfoundland legislature

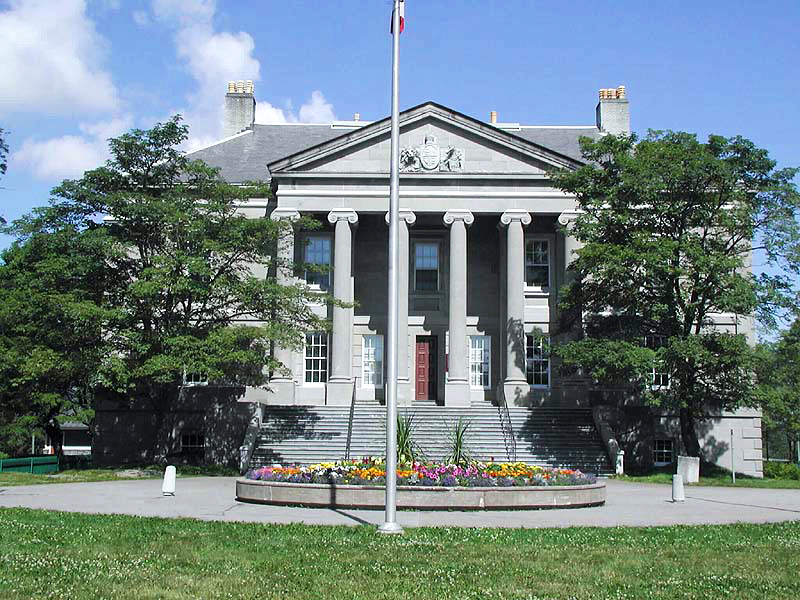
- Colonial Building seat of the Newfoundland government and the House of Assembly from January 28, 1850 to July 28, 1959.

History
- Founded: 1853
- Disbanded: 1855
- Preceded by: 4th General Assembly of Newfoundland
- Succeeded by: 6th General Assembly of Newfoundland

Leadership
- Speaker: John Kent

Elections
- Last election: 1852 Newfoundland general election

The members of the 5th General Assembly of Newfoundland were elected in the Newfoundland general election held in 1852. The general assembly sat from 1853 to 1855.

John Kent was chosen as speaker.

Ker Baillie-Hamilton served as civil governor of Newfoundland.

Although Baillie-Hamilton was opposed to any change in the colony's system of government, in March 1854, Philip Francis Little and Robert John Parsons, with the support of Joseph Hume, were able to persuade the secretary of state for the colonies, the Duke of Newcastle, to grant responsible government to the colony.

Later in 1854, the assembly passed a Representation Act to double the number of seats in the assembly; this satisfied one of the conditions set by Newcastle for implementation of responsible government.

Baillie-Hamilton delayed the upcoming general election until May 1855 because he felt that a winter election would be unfair to Protestant voters living in remote areas of the colony.

== Members of the Assembly ==
The following members were elected to the assembly in 1852:

Member	Electoral district	Affiliation	First elected / previously elected
John Henry Warren	Bonavista Bay	Conservative	1852
Clement Benning	Burin	Liberal	1852
John Bemister	Conception Bay	Conservative	1852
Edmund Hanrahan	Conception Bay	Liberal	1848
John Hayward	Conception Bay	Conservative	1852
William Talbot	Conception Bay	Liberal	1852
Peter Winser	Ferryland	Liberal	1848
George Henry Emerson (Note: By 1854, Emerson had aligned himself with the Liberals, bringing their number to ten.)	Fogo	Conservative	1848
Hugh William Hoyles	Fortune Bay	Conservative	1848
George James Hogsett	Placentia and St. Mary's	Liberal	1852
Ambrose Shea	Placentia and St. Mary's	Liberal	1848
John Kent	St. John's	Liberal	1832, 1848
Philip Francis Little	St. John's	Liberal	1850
Robert John Parsons	St. John's	Liberal	1843
Stephen March	Trinity Bay	Conservative	1852

== By-elections ==
None
