= Jack Hayward (disambiguation) =

Jack Hayward may refer to:

- Jack Hayward (footballer) (1904-1974), see List of AFC Bournemouth players
- Jack Hayward (1923-2015), Sir Jack Arnold Hayward OBE, English businessman
- Jack Hayward (political scientist) (1931-2017), English writer and academic

== See also ==
- John Hayward (disambiguation)
