= John Hayward =

John Hayward may refer to:

== Politicians ==
- John Hayward (MP for Bridport) (c. 1355–1407), MP for Bridport, 1373–1401
- John Hayward (MP for Dorchester), MP for Dorchester, 1558
- Sir John Hayward (historian) (c. 1560–1627), English historian and politician
- John Hayward (MP for Bletchingley) (c. 1571–1631)
- John Hayward (MP for Bridgnorth and Saltash) (c. 1591–1636), English politician
- John Hayward (Massachusetts politician) (died 1672), member of the Great and General Court
- John Hayward (Newfoundland politician) (1819–1885), Newfoundland politician and judge

== Others ==
- John Hayward (architect) (1808–1891), Exeter-based Gothic revival architect
- Sir John Davy Hayward (1905–1965), English editor, friend of T. S. Eliot.
- Sir Jack Hayward (1923–2015), property developer
- Jack Hayward (cricketer) (1910-1976), Rhodesian cricketer
- Jack Hayward (political scientist) (1931–2017), English writer and academic
- John T. Hayward (1908–1999), U.S. naval aviator and nuclear physicist
- John Hayward (artist) (1929–2007), British artist best known for stained glass
- John Hayward (British author), British author and social campaigner
- John William Hayward (1844–1913), Newfoundland artist and inventor
- John Langford Hayward (1923–2013), British breast surgeon

== See also ==
- John Haywood (disambiguation)
- John Heywood (disambiguation)
