= John Haywood =

John Haywood or Heywood may refer to:

- John Haywood (politician) (1755–1827), North Carolina state treasurer
- John Haywood (judge) (1762–1826), American judge and historian
- John Haywood (British historian), British historian and author
- John Haywood (cricketer), English cricketer

== See also ==
- John Heywood (disambiguation)
- John Heywood Hawkins (1802–1877), British Member of Parliament
- John Hayward (disambiguation)
