= Edward Morris (politician) =

Newfoundland politician (1813–1887)

The Honourable Edward Morris MLC

2nd President of the Legislative Council of Newfoundland
- In office May 5, 1870 – May 6, 1885
- Prime Minister: Charles Fox Bennett; Sir Frederick Carter; Sir William Whiteway
- Governor: Stephen John Hill; Sir John Hawley Glover; Sir Henry Maxse; Sir John Hawley Glover
- Preceded by: Laurence O'Brien
- Succeeded by: Edward Dalton Shea

Member of the Legislative Council of Newfoundland
- In office 1858 – April 3, 1887
- Appointed by: Alexander Bannerman

Personal details
- Born: 1813 Waterford, Ireland
- Died: April 3, 1887 (aged 73–74) St. John's, Newfoundland Colony
- Party: Liberal
- Spouse: Katherine Howley (m. 1852)
- Children: 1 daughter
- Relatives: Simon Morris (father); Patrick Morris (uncle); John Kent (cousin)
- Education: St John's College, Waterford
- Occupation: Businessman, farmer

Edward Morris (1813 – April 3, 1887) was an Irish-born Newfoundland politician who served as the President of the Legislative Council for 15 years from 1870 to 1885.

== Early life and business career ==
Morris was born in 1813 in Waterford, Ireland as the son of Simon Morris. After graduating from St John's College, he emigrated to St. John's, Newfoundland in 1832 to join the mercantile firm owned by his uncle Patrick Morris as a commission agent. When Patrick Morris liquidated his firm in 1839, Edward Morris attempted to start his own firm, which was ultimately unsuccessful. Through the patronage of the elder Morris, Edward Morris found work with the Newfoundland Savings Bank in 1842, and he was eventually promoted to general manager in 1852. That same year, he married Katherine Howley in St. John's, and the couple had one daughter. They owned a small farm in the outskirts of St. John's which supplemented his income.

When responsible government was introduced to the Newfoundland Colony in 1855, Morris expressed interest in running for the Newfoundland House of Assembly as a Liberal candidate, but Bishop John Thomas Mullock passed him over when nominating the party's candidates. As compensation, Morris was instead selected by premier Philip Francis Little as a reporter for the House of Assembly later that year. He was then named to the Legislative Council, the colony's upper house, in 1858 by governor Sir Alexander Bannerman.

In 1870, Morris was made President of the Legislative Council. Governor Stephen John Hill regarded Morris as socially inferior and protested his entry into the position. During his tenure as President of the Legislative Council, he served as acting administrator of the colony on two occasions in 1870 and 1883 respectively.
