= John Dillon (Newfoundland politician) =

Newfoundland politician

Member of the House of Assembly for Placentia-St. Mary's
- In office 1842–1848 Serving with Simon Morris
- Preceded by: Patrick Doyle; John Nugent
- Succeeded by: John Delaney; Sir Ambrose Shea

Personal details
- Party: Liberal

John Dillon was a Newfoundland politician who represented the district of Placentia-St. Mary's in the House of Assembly from 1842 to 1848. He did not run for re-election in 1848.
