= Volker Hermes =

German visual artist

Volker Hermes (born 1972 in Wegberg) is a German visual artist.

== Life and career ==
Hermes studied at the Kunstakademie Düsseldorf from 1995 to 2002 under Dieter Krieg, becoming his Meisterschüler (master student) in 2000. From 1999 to 2001, he was a scholarship recipient of the Studienstiftung des deutschen Volkes.

Hermes has exhibited his work in exhibitions and artistic projects in Europe and the United States. His Hidden Portraits series has attracted international attention. In June 2023, the Metropolitan Museum of Art in New York featured his work as part of its online Perspectives series. A work by Hermes appeared on the cover of the October 2022 issue of The New York Review of Books, and Christie's New York collaborated with him on a project for its Classic Week in 2020. His work has also been covered by media outlets beyond the art world, including the American edition of Vogue, Harper's Bazaar, and Germany's Zeitmagazin.

== Work ==
Major series by Hermes include Parforce, Humboldt Hybride, and Hidden Portraits. Parforce is primarily a painterly exploration of the genre of marine painting. In Humboldt Hybride, Hermes combines paintings, drawings, and digital collages to examine the representation of rational knowledge alongside the experience of discovery, drawing on imagery associated with early scientific expeditions.

Hermes is best known internationally for his Hidden Portraits series. The works are digital collages based on historical portraits. Hermes focuses in particular on the visual signs and symbols through which sitters historically conveyed status, identity, and social position in portrait painting. He digitally modifies and exaggerates these elements, creating altered versions of historical portraits.

== Fellowships and residencies ==
- 1999–2001: Scholarship, Studienstiftung des deutschen Volkes
- 2000: Travel scholarship, Kunstakademie Düsseldorf
- 2002: Scholarship, Kunstverein Düsseldorf
- 2003: Artists' scholarship of the Federal Republic of Germany, German Study Centre in Venice, Venice
- 2005: Artist-in-residence in Ein Hod, Israel

== Selected exhibitions ==
=== Solo exhibitions ===
- 2025: Hidden Portraits / Portraits Cachés, Château d'Azay-le-Rideau, France
- 2025: The Look, James Freeman Gallery, London (with Derrick Guild)
- 2024: Auge und Zeit, Suermondt-Ludwig-Museum, Aachen
- 2023: Ruff Hood, James Freeman Gallery, London
- 2023: Rococo Madness, National Museum in Wrocław, Wrocław
- 2021: Inszenierungen des Zeigens, Kunsthaus Nordrhein-Westfalen Kornelimünster, Kornelimünster
- 2020: Hidden Portraits. Identità s-velate, Civic Museums of Pavia, Italy
- 2020: Christie's featuring Hidden Portraits, Christie's, Rockefeller Center, New York
- 2018: fly like paper (für Mira), Galerie Bräuning Contemporary, Hamburg
- 2014: Humboldt Hybride, Galerie Bräuning Contemporary, Hamburg
- 2012: Parforce, Galerie Bräuning Contemporary, Hamburg
- 2011: Tape modern, Berlin
- 2011: Kleine Welten, CAS Galerie, Salzburg
- 2008: Ich suche Du, Kunstverein Region Heinsberg, Heinsberg
- 2005: delicious suicide, Galerie Kunstbüro Düsseldorf
- 2004: Spört ist Mörd, CirculationsCentralen Gallery, Malmö, Sweden
- 2003: Finde Klarheit in dunklen Wassern und brenne, Kunst Klub Aquarellbluten, Cologne
- 2002: bel air bench, Het Glazen Huis, Amsterdam

=== Group exhibitions ===
- 2025: Rococo Reboot!, Modemuseum Hasselt, Hasselt, Belgium
- 2022: UltraQueer, Museum Palazzo Merulana, Rome
- 2022: Unveiled, The Beaney House, Canterbury Museums, Canterbury
- 2020: you are here, Kunsthaus NRW, Kornelimünster
- 2017: Akademie, Kunst im Tunnel, Düsseldorf
- 2016: 50 contemporary artists, Enter Art Foundation, Berlin
- 2013: Hang zur Kunst, pop-up exhibition, Stuttgart
- 2006: Kunstrasen 2006, Ersatzbank der Gefühle, Stadtmuseum Halle, Halle (Saale)
- 2004: co_op, Kunstverein Hildesheim (with Jörg Rothhaar)
- 2002: Ich und Wolfgang, Galerie Kunstbüro Düsseldorf
- 2002: Bildräume, Kunstverein Landau
- 2001: Paper Jam, Kunstverein Bielefeld, Bielefeld
- 2000: Flag Parade, Abteiberg Museum, Mönchengladbach

== Selected projects ==
- 2025: Portrait und Mensch, online exhibition with the Prussian Palaces and Gardens Foundation Berlin-Brandenburg
- 2022: Lecture and talk, Lebanese American University, Beirut
- 2022: A New Voice in an Old World, talk as part of the Art History Festival UK
- 2021: Podcast, Athena Art Foundation, New York
- 2021: Face Off Symposium, Manchester Fashion Institute, Manchester Metropolitan University
- 2020: Podcast, Colnaghi Foundation, London/New York
- 2020: Podcast, Dress:Fancy, London
- 2019: Ziggy Medal, with Rita McBride, design of an artists' medal, Düsseldorf
- 2018: Île Flottante, British Pavilion, Venice Biennale of Architecture, Venice
- 2016: Hand-painted costumes for The Makropulos Affair by Leoš Janáček, Deutsche Oper Berlin, Berlin
- 2013: Contributed artwork to the film Only Lovers Left Alive, directed by Jim Jarmusch
- 2011: Hand-painted costumes for Tristan und Isolde by Richard Wagner, Ruhrtriennale
- 2010: Hand-painted costumes for the premiere of the opera Gisela by Hans Werner Henze, Ruhrtriennale
- 1999–2002: Co-founder and curator of the exhibition space PLUS e.V., Düsseldorf

== Media and interviews ==
- Artists on Artists, conversation with Peter Brathwaite, National Gallery
- Hidden Portraits by Volker Hermes, Deutsche Welle, 2021
- Ist uns das Lachen vergangen?, feature on Volker Hermes in aspekte, ZDF, 2021 (no longer available online)
- Meet the artist: Volker Hermes at James Freeman Gallery, Athena Art Foundation, 2023
- The Portraits of Volker Hermes, Christopher Alessandrini, The Met Perspectives, New York
- Classic Week's Hidden Portraits, interview with Volker Hermes, Christie's New York
- These Masked Portraits Are an Instagram Sensation, Tiziana Cardini, Vogue, 2020
- Hidden Leighton: Volker Hermes Reimagined Historical Paintings, interview with Volker Hermes, Leighton House, London
- Die maskierten Porträts des deutschen Künstlers Volker Hermes werden gerade zur Internet-Sensation, Hanna Buehrle, Vogue Germany, 2021
- History Revisited, Vogue Portugal
- Podcast with Volker Hermes, Colnaghi Foundation, 2021
- Athena Livestream with Volker Hermes, Athena Art Foundation, 2022
- In Conversation with the artist Volker Hermes, talk with curator Dr Benjamin Wild, Manchester Fashion Institute, 2021
- Whimsical, Surreal & Insightful: The Masked Portraits of Volker Hermes Breathe New Life into Classical Portraiture, Eric David, Yatzer, 2021
- Hidden Portraits by Volker Hermes at James Freeman Gallery, Christina Petridou, designboom, 2023
- Overly Grand Manners: Volker Hermes Exaggerates Historical Portraits with Ostentatious Absurdity, Kate Mothes, Colossal, 2023

== Publications ==
- Volker Hermes: Hidden Portraits, Old Masters Reimagined. ACC Art Books, New York, 2024. ISBN 978-1-788842-81-5.
