= William Slade =

William Slade may refer to:

- William Slade (politician) (1786–1859), American politician, governor of Vermont
- William Slade (valet), employee of President Lincoln
- Will Slade (born 1983), Australian footballer
- William Slade (athlete) (1873–1941), 1908 Olympics tug of war competitor
- Bill Slade (William Slade, 1898–1968) English football manager
- Billy Slade (William Douglas Slade, 1941–2019), Welsh cricketer
