= Kathy Slade =

Canadian artist (born 1966)

- Born: Montreal, Quebec, Canada
- Education: Simon Fraser University; The European Graduate School
- Website: http://www.kathyslade.com/

Kathy Slade (1966) is a Canadian artist, author, curator, editor, and publisher born in Montreal, Quebec, and based in Vancouver, British Columbia. She is currently a Term Lecturer at Simon Fraser University's School for the Contemporary Arts.

== Education ==
Slade graduated with a B.A. from Simon Fraser University in Burnaby, BC in 1990, and received an M.A. from the European Graduate School in Saas-Fee, Switzerland in 2018. Slade graduated from SFU with the Helen Pitt Graduate Award.

== Work ==
Slade has worked in a variety of mediums including embroidery, sound, sculpture, books, film, and video. The artist draws upon "sources ranging from cult films and punk rock music to literary classics and recent art history." Slade founded the Emily Carr University Press. In 1999, she developed READ Books, a bookstore located in the Charles H. Scott Gallery, now called the Libby Leshgold Gallery, at Emily Carr University of Art and Design. In 2009, Slade received the VIVA Award, awarded by the Jack and Doris Shadbolt Foundation "annually to celebrate exemplary achievement by British Columba artists in mid-career."

== Selected exhibitions ==
=== Solo exhibitions ===
The Art Gallery of Alberta exhibited Slade's work titled Charrette Roulette: Language: Kathy Slade, Kay Higgins and Publication Studio Vancouver (2015), which was an "on-going collaborative project [that] posits publication as an art practice, while blurring the line between curatorial and editorial practice." For Edmonton Edition, PSV printed and bound books onsite working with artists to produce new artists’ books."

In 2012 and 2013, the artist exhibited It was a strange apartment; full of books… with Lisa Robertson at the Galerie Au 8 rue Saint Bon, Paris, France, and at Malaspina Printmakers, Vancouver, BC. In 2006, Slade exhibited 52 Transactions, which chronicled the artist's receipts from transactions at the Vancouver Public Library.

I Want It All I Want It Now was exhibited at the Or Gallery in Vancouver in 2003, which included the video installation Please Please Please depicting Slade’s point of view as she strolls through the streets of Vancouver leading from her studio to the Or Gallery with as she accompanies herself in song, covering The Smiths’ "Please Please Please Let Me Get What I Want."

In 2002, the artist exhibited "Embroidered Monochrome Propositions and Other New Work" at the Western Front Gallery in Vancouver featuring a number of monochrome paintings embroidered by machine, repeating a stitch to fill the entire canvas. These works draw upon histories of decorative art, feminism, technology, labour histories, and minimalist/conceptual practices.

=== Group exhibitions ===
Slade's work was featured in the exhibition Beginning with the Seventies: GLUT at the Morris and Helen Belkin Art Gallery, Vancouver BC, in 2018. This all female artist exhibition focused on the excess and abundance of the archive, language, and the position of the female reader as an artistic genre. Slade exhibited three artworks in this show, including a floor to ceiling mural in the UBC Walter C. Koerner Library.

In 2016, Slade's work was exhibited in the show titled Yesterday was Once Tomorrow (or, A Brick is a Tool) at Artexte in Montreal, QC, and in 2015 at Plug In ICA in Winnipeg, MB. The show focused on Canadian art magazines that were begun and terminated in the 1990s, and, "pinpoints, for the first time, a loose network of activity taking place in major parts of Canada." Also in 2016, the artist was featured in the Art Gallery of Alberta's exhibition titled The Blur In Between, which examined the merging of traditional art and design as disciplines.

The artist was included in the exhibition Barroco Nova: Neo Baroque Moves in Contemporary Art at the Museum London in London ON in 2011. The exhibition "presents a vast range of projects by 19 Canadian and international contemporary artists whose approaches rely on intensified appeals to our senses to produce an engaged address to our cultural moment: visions that arguably take up Liebnitzian notions of the fold and possible worlds."

In 2010, the artist exhibited in the Tate Modern's Turbine Hall along with 70 other arts organizations presenting examples of their work in an arts festival held in honor of the Tate's 10th birthday, referred to as No Soul For Sale. Also in that year, Slade was one of 70 international artists featured in the Vancouver Art Gallery's CUE: Artists' Video, an "exhibition of video art displayed on the portico of the Robson Street facade. In transforming its exterior into a freely accessible, open-air exhibition space, the Gallery has created an opportunity for the public to experience contemporary experimental film and video in new way."

Slade's work was again exhibited at the Vancouver Art Gallery in 2009 in the show How Soon is Now, which highlights contemporary BC artists. Also that year, the artist was included in a group exhibition at the Kamloops Art Gallery entitled Celebrity of the Self along with Tim Lee, Shannon Oksanen, Stephen Shearer, Kathy Slade, Althea Thauberger, and Weekend Leisure. In 2008, Slade exhibited alongside Aaron Carpenter and Steven Hubert in the exhibition titled Hold On at the Or Gallery; her short film "Tugboat" features "a tugboat 'wrapping doughnuts' in Vancouver’s industrial harbour. The 16mm film loop is both playful and melancholic, as it is unclear whether this workhorse of BC’s resource and shipping economies is caught in playful abandon or if the boat is revolving in a momentary lapse of agency."

In 2007 Slade exhibited at the Whitney Museum of American Art as part of Whitney Live, along with Rita McBride, Discoteca Flaming Star, Jay Batlle, David Gray, Michael Mahalchick, RH Quaytman, Glen Rubsamen, and Kimberly Sexton.
