= John Slade =

John Slade may refer to:

- John Slade (merchant) (1719–1792), British sea captain, shipowner and merchant
- John Slade (field hockey) (1908–2005), German hockey player
- John Slade (politician) (1819–1847), merchant and politician in Newfoundland
- John Ramsay Slade (1843–1913), British general
- John Slade, English schoolmaster and Roman Catholic martyr, see John Bodey
- John Slade, protagonist of Shadowgun, see Shadowgun
- John F. Slade III (born 1943), American judge
- Sir John Slade, 1st Baronet (1762–1859), British soldier during the Napoleonic Wars

== See also ==
- Jack Slade
