= Job Brothers & Co., Limited =

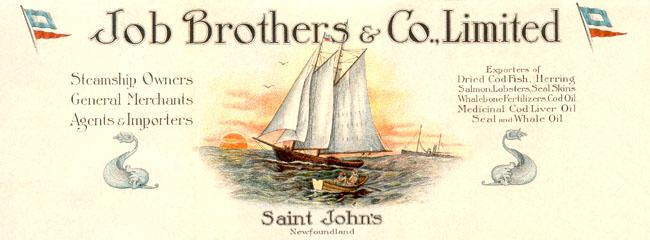
- Company type: Private
- Industry: Production and development of fisheries
- Founded: 1750
- Headquarters: St. John's, Newfoundland
- Key people: John Bulley & John Job (founders)

Job Brothers & Co., Limited (formerly: Bulley, Job & Company, Bulley, Job & Cross, Job Brothers; commonly referred to as Jobs) was a Colony of Newfoundland-based mercantile empire that spanned three centuries. The main business of the company centered on production and development of fisheries rather than trading. The Job Brothers & Co., Limited letterhead, however, self describes the company as "steamship owners, general merchants, agents, and importers" as well as "exporters of dried cod fish, herring, salmon, lobsters, seal skins, whalebone fertilizers, cod oil, medicinal cod liver oil, seal and whale oil". As president of Job's Brothers, Hazen Russell had the company's vessel, Blue Peter, outfitted as the first floating, frozen-fish processing factory in the world.

== Early history ==
House flag used by Job Brothers & Co

The business originated around 1750 with John Bulley of Teignmouth, Devon as the sole proprietor. Eventually, Bulley's son, Samuel took over the business. When his daughter Sarah married John Job (born Haccombe, Devon) in 1789, Bulley made Job his partner in the newly formed company, Bulley, Job and Company. The company's main division focused on the fish trade, including the purchase and export of codfish, with fishermen or other traders as clients. Another division handled the shipping and outfitting of vessels that participated in spring seal hunting.

The company and its partnerships evolved over time. In 1808, when Nathan Parker joined the company, it was renamed Parker, Bulley and Job. Within the next twelve years, when Parker retired and James Cross of Liverpool joined the company, it was renamed Bulley, Job & Cross. In 1834, at age 15, Stephen Rendell, later a merchant and politician, apprenticed with Jobs. An 1839 reorganization put Robert Job and Thomas Bulley Job in charge of Bulley, Job and Company in St. John's, while Samuel Job and John Job Jr. were in charge of Job Brothers in Liverpool, England. About the same time, with the retirement of Thomas Bulley, the company was renamed Job Brothers. The partnership included the four sons of John Job: Robert Job, Thomas Bulley Job, Samuel Job and John Job. Others joined the firm in the next few years thus leading to its renaming as Job Brothers & Company. Other partnerships ensued over the next century.

Between 1867 and 1872, Jobs built three large "wooden walls" (wooden-hulled naval vessels) that were used for sealing, including Neptune, at the same time also establishing plants at Bay Bulls, Catalina, and L'Anse-au-Loup that converted fish offal into fertilizer. In the last century, Jobs pioneered artificial fish drying at its plants in Blanc Sablon, L'Anse-au-Loup, and Forteau. Its steamship, Blue Peter, was the first floating, frozen-fish processing outfit in Newfoundland. Other diversification included manufacturing, mining, processing, and timber. Jobs bought Hector around 1871, rebuilt her and renamed her Diana. By 1898, it had acquired another steamer, Nimrod.

== Later years ==
In 1909, Erik broke her shaft and had to be tugged by another Jobs' vessel, Beothic. In the same year, Thomas Raffles Job (son of Thomas Bulley Job), Samuel Ernest Job, William Carson Job, and Robert Brown Job incorporated Job Brothers & Co., Limited. Thomas Raffles Job, grandson of the original John Job, became its president. The other three family members, great-grandsons of John Job, became the directors. In 1912, Jobs had a new steel steamer, Nascopie.

After Thomas Raffles Job died in 1917, William Carson Job became the company's second president. With William Carson Jobs retirement in 1919, Robert Brown Job became the company's third president. In 1928, the Hudson's Bay Company purchased a majority of the company's shares but these were re-acquired by Jobs fifteen years later. In 1945, Northatlantic Fisheries purchased sixty percent of Jobs' shares. Other Jobs plants were sold in the next two decades. The remaining Jobs plant in St. John's closed operations in 1967.
