= Sam Slade =

Sam Slade may refer to:

- Robo-Hunter, a British comic strip starring Sam Slade
- Sam Slade (politician), Canadian politician
- Sam Slade (rugby union), rugby union player

== See also ==
- Samuel Slade, Church of England clergyman
