= William Talbot =

William Talbot may refer to:

- Sir William Talbot (died 1396), MP for Cornwall in 1380 and 1385
- Sir William Talbot (died 1429), MP for Cornwall in 1402 and 1414
- Sir William Talbot, 1st Baronet (died 1633), Irish lawyer and politician
- Sir William Talbot, 3rd Baronet (c. 1643–1691), Irish politician and judge
- William Talbot (Jacobite) (died 1689), Irish Jacobite soldier
- William Talbot (died 1724), Irish Jacobite politician
- William Talbot (bishop) (1658–1730), Bishop of Oxford, Salisbury and Bishop of Durham
- William Talbot, 1st Earl Talbot (1710–1782), British nobleman and politician
- William Talbot (1715–1787), Irish MP for St Johnstown
- William Talbot (1717–1774), "Talbot of Kineton", evangelical clergyman of the Church of England and grandson of the bishop
- Talbot v. Jansen, the Supreme Court case involving an American named William Talbot
- William Talbot (1776–1851), Irish MP for Kilkenny
- William Talbot (Newfoundland politician) (died 1873), former member of the Newfoundland House of Assembly
- William Fox Talbot (1800–1877), inventor of the negative / positive photographic process
- William F. Talbot (died 1967), first director of SRI International
- William Phillips Talbot (1915–2010), American diplomat
- Billy Talbot (born 1943), American singer-songwriter
- William Talbot (piper), 19th century bagpiper
- William Talbot Handy (1894–1983), American Methodist minister
- William Talbot Handy, Jr. (1924–1998), American Methodist bishop
