= Robert Henry Prowse =

Newfoundland politician (1828–1904)

Robert Henry Prowse MHA
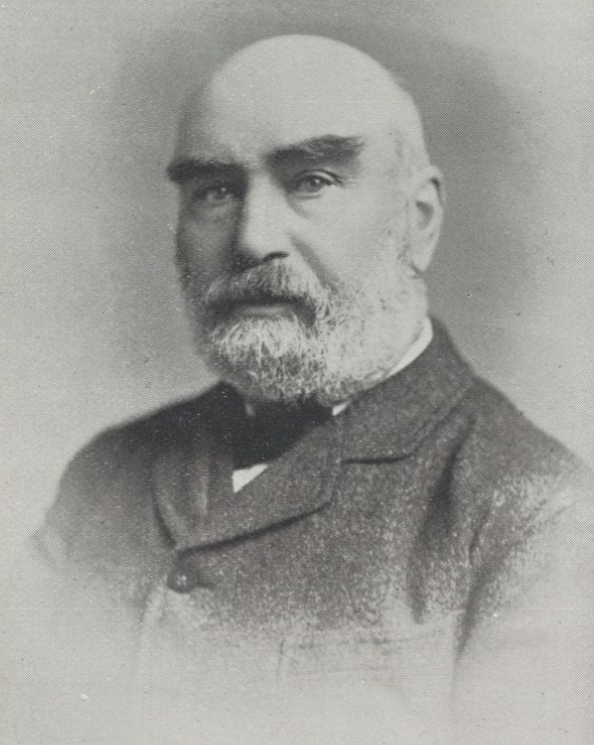
- Prowse in 1894

Member of the Newfoundland House of Assembly for Burgeo-La Poile
- In office May 7, 1855 – November 7, 1859
- Preceded by: District established
- Succeeded by: James Seaton

Personal details
- Born: April 19, 1828 Port de Grave, Newfoundland Colony
- Died: December 28, 1904 (aged 76) St. John's, Newfoundland Colony
- Party: Conservative
- Spouse: Jeanie Catherine McLea (m. 1853)
- Relatives: Daniel Woodley Prowse (brother)
- Education: Acadia College; University of Edinburgh
- Occupation: Merchant

Robert Henry Prowse (April 19, 1828 – December 28, 1904) was a merchant and politician in Newfoundland. As a Conservative supporter of Hugh Hoyles, he was the first elected representative of Burgeo-LaPoile in the Newfoundland House of Assembly, serving from 1855 to 1859.

== Business career and politics ==
Prowse was born in Port de Grave, the son of Robert Prowse and Jane (née Woodley). He was educated at Acadia College and the University of Edinburgh. Upon his return home, he became a partner in his father's firm and married Jeanie McLea.

When the Newfoundland Colony gained responsible government in 1855, Prowse served in the House of Assembly for one term as the first representative for the district of Burgeo-La Poile. Following his tenure in the assembly, he served as consul for Germany in Newfoundland. He was also a director for the St. John's Gas Light Company and president of the Chamber of Commerce.

His brother Daniel Woodley was a prominent Newfoundland historian who later succeeded him as the representative for Burgeo-La Poile in the Newfoundland assembly.
