= George Chandler (priest) =

Anglican priest

George Chandler (1779?–1859) was an Anglican priest.

== Education ==
Chandler was educated at Winchester College, New College, Oxford, and the Inner Temple. New College, Oxford awarded him his B.C.L. (Bachelor of Civil Law) in 1804 and D.C.L. (Doctor of Civil Law) in 1824.

== Career ==
Chandler was Bampton Lecturer in 1825, and Chairman of the Committee appointed by the Society for Promoting Christian Knowledge (SPCK) of General Literature. Some of the more time-consuming work, he did for the SPCK, was the editing of their school books.

Between 1825 and 1847, Chandler was Rector of All Souls Church, Langham Place, Marylebone, Middlesex, and from 1830 to 1859 was Dean of Chichester.

Because of his duties at All Souls, Chandler was only in Chichester for 90 days a year. It was not unusual for deanships to be part-time positions. The belief that deaneries should be full-time appointments had contributed to strained relations between deans and their chapters. Between 1830 and 1902 there were five Deans of Chichester, the first was Chandler and he probably was the one who had the best rapport with his chapter, whereas the four deans that succeeded him all had problems.

At the establishment of the Chichester Literary and Ecclesiological Society in February 1831, Chandler accepted the office of President and delivered the inaugural lecture. He spent much time on their affairs and for many years continued to give the annual opening address of the session. He was elected a Fellow of the Royal Society in 1833.

In partnership with William Otter (the Bishop of Chichester), a Theological College was created in Chichester in 1839, with Charles Marriott as the first principal.

== Building and restoration work ==
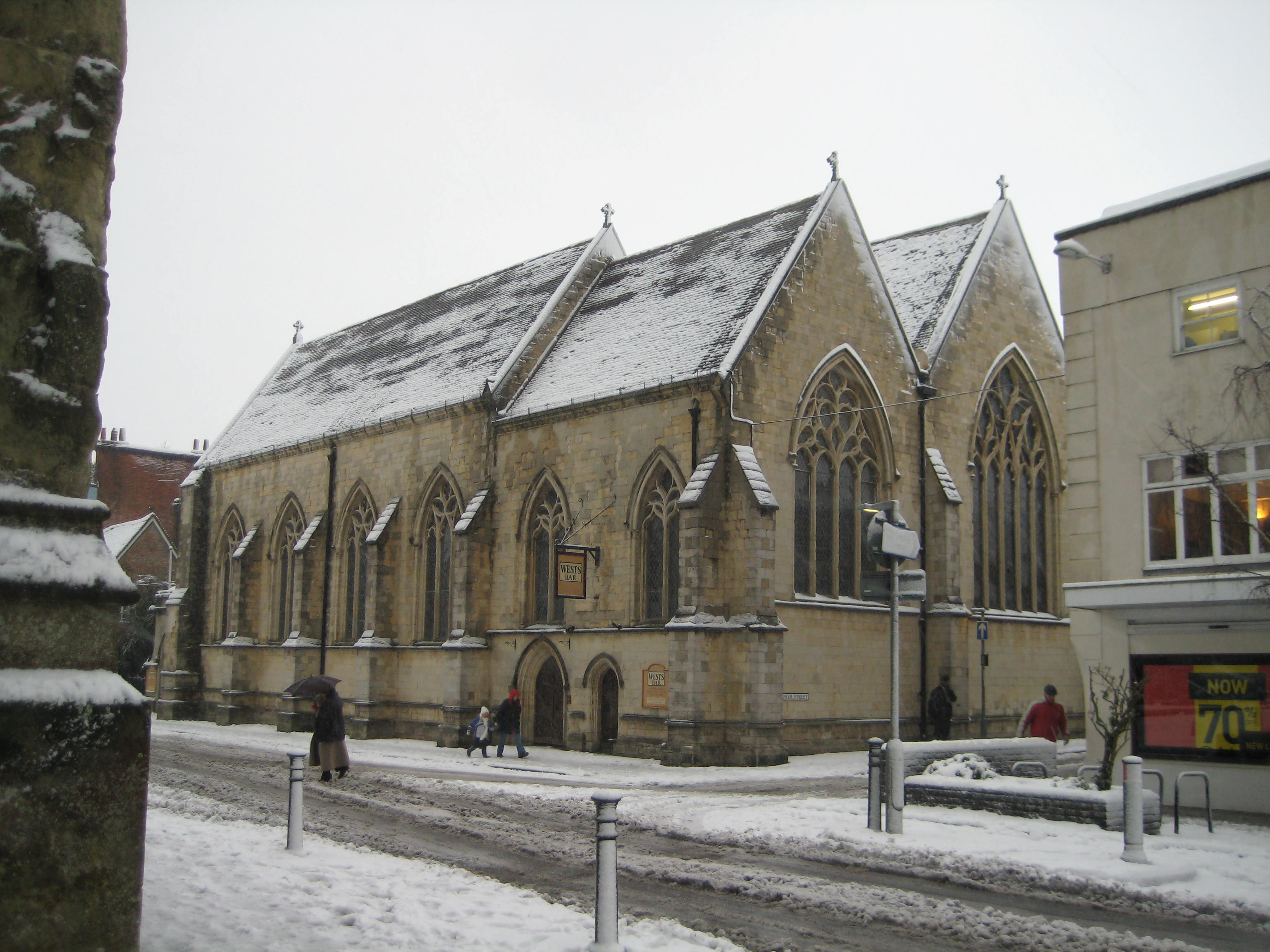
The former church of St Peter the Great.

Chichester Cathedral was in a poor state of repair when Chandler was appointed Dean. There had been a lot of damage to the cathedral during the Reformation, at the instigation of the Vicar General, Thomas Cromwell. The records and muniments were damaged during the civil war after the siege of Chichester, with the cathedral library itself nearly being sold off in London. The destruction of the contents of the cathedral had been compounded by years of neglect. Chandler took on the task of restoring the cathedral and work started during the 1840s. With restoration being carried out on the nave and its windows. Joseph Butler was appointed architect and surveyor in 1841. However Chandler refused to sanction the restoration of the choir, on the grounds that the architectural knowledge was not sufficiently advanced! The choir was not restored during Chandler's tenure but he did leave £2000 in his will for its restoration.

In the north transept of Chichester Cathedral, there was the parish church (or sub deanery) of St Peter the Great; its presence was possibly due to the cathedral being moved in 1075 from the Saxon see in Selsey to the site of the original St Peter's church in Chichester, hence the sharing of the property. In 1841 the partition was removed and plans for a separate parish church were supported by Chandler. After a public appeal, Richard Cromwell Carpenter was appointed as architect and the church built in 1848–52. Chandler provided funds for the pews in the new church out of his own pocket. The church could seat hundred people, making it the largest parish church in Chichester. However faced with a diminishing congregation and the possibility of expensive repair bills it was put up for sale in 1979. It now serves as a restaurant and bar.

== See also ==
- History of Sussex

Church of England titles
Preceded by Samuel Slade	Dean of Chichester; 1830–1859	Succeeded by Walter Farquhar Hook
