= Mae West (sculpture) =

Hyperboloid structure in Munich, Germany

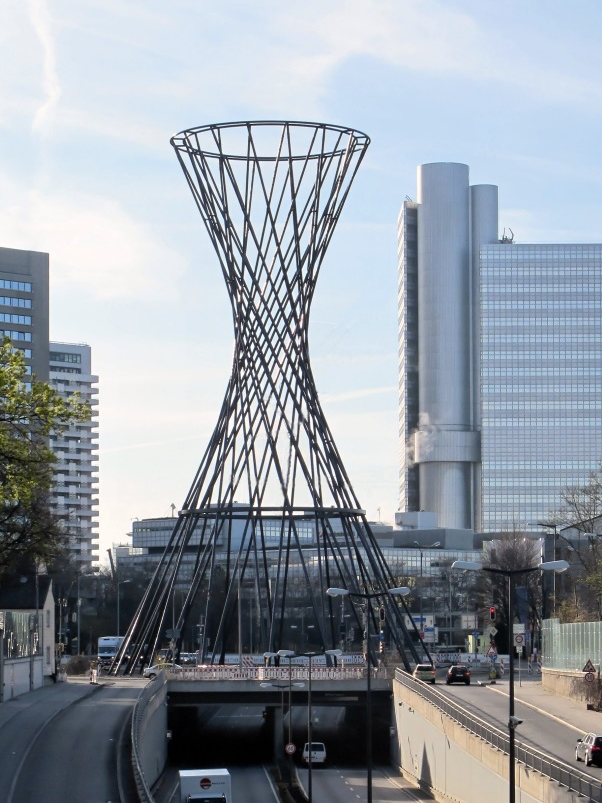
- Artist: Rita McBride
- Year: 2002-2011
- Dimensions: 52 m (171 ft)
- Location: Munich, Germany
- Coordinates: 48.1525779°N 11.6121773°E

Mae West is a sculpture in Munich-Bogenhausen designed by Rita McBride. Named after the eponymous actress, the plastic artwork is a 52 meter high hyperboloid of one sheet built from carbon fiber reinforced polymer.

Mae West was planned in 2002 for the altered Effnerplatz after construction of a tunnel for the so-called Mittlerer Ring. Following highly controversial discussions about size, shape and cost both within the city council and among the citizens, the sculpture was built between October 2010 and January 2011. Since December 2011, the Munich tram runs through it.

== Location ==
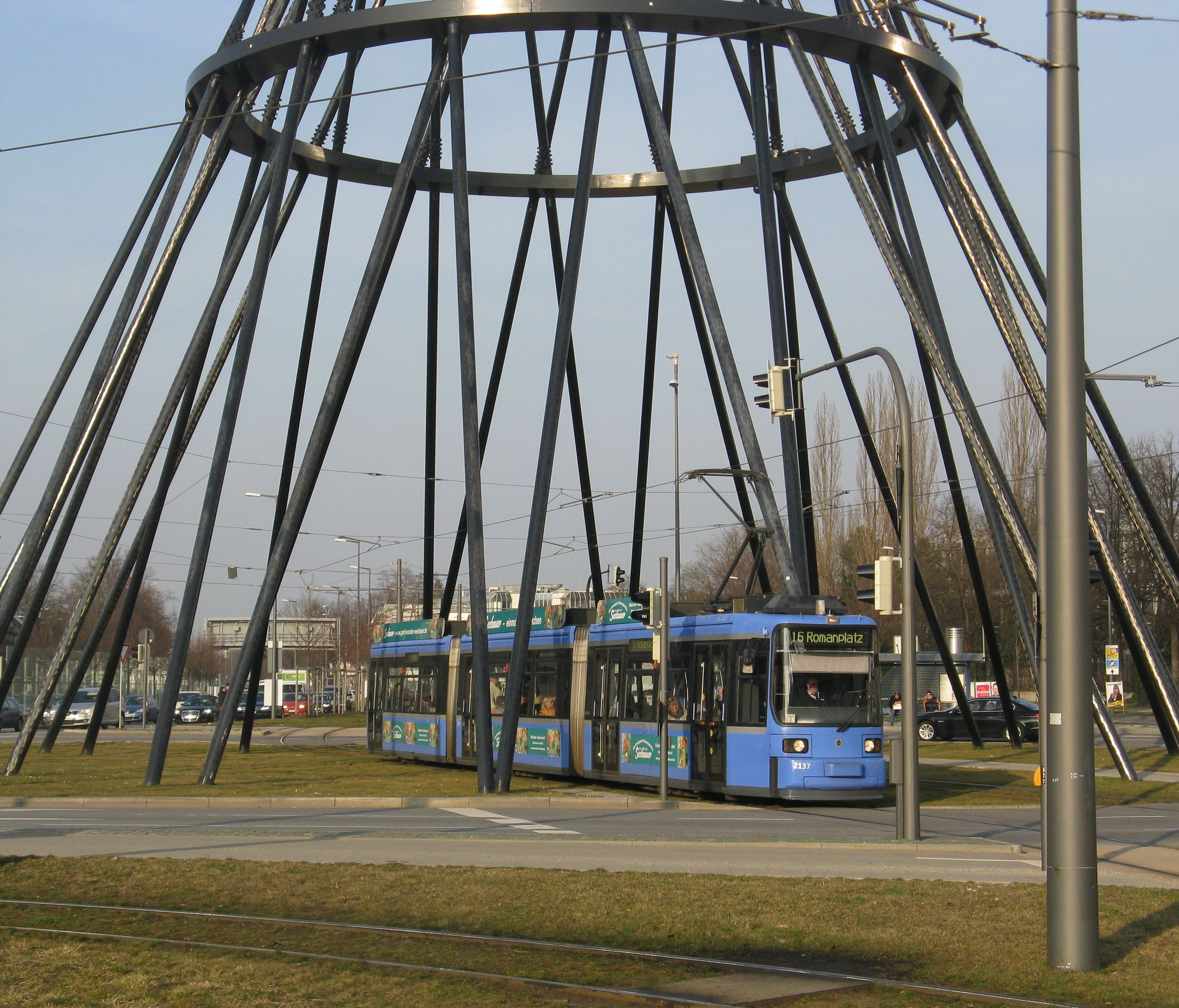
A tram passing through Mae West

Mae West is located at the center of the Effnerplatz (Effner square) in Munich-Bogenhausen, at the intersection of Mittlerer Ring, Bülowstraße and Effnerstraße. The sculpture stands on top of the Effnertunnel constructed for the Mittlerer Ring. The Arabellapark is to the east of the sculpture, and several stops of the Munich tram and Bus system are located nearby.

== History ==
=== Idea, planning and development ===
In 2002, due to the planning of the Effnertunnel, the newly available square was selected as the site of a new art project and eight artists were asked to develop ideas for the area. In the end, Rita McBride's idea won against drafts by, among others, Thomas Schütte and Dennis Oppenheim.

Due to the size of 52 m (171 ft) (previously 60 m) and the projected costs of € 1.5m, the sculpture was highly controversial. Munich mayor Christian Ude was the most prominent critic, comparing the sculpture to an egg cup. After heated discussions, Munich's city council voted 40–35 to build the sculpture, with the co-ruling Alliance 90/The Greens party joining the opposition parties to vote for the sculpture.

=== Construction ===
Construction of Mae West

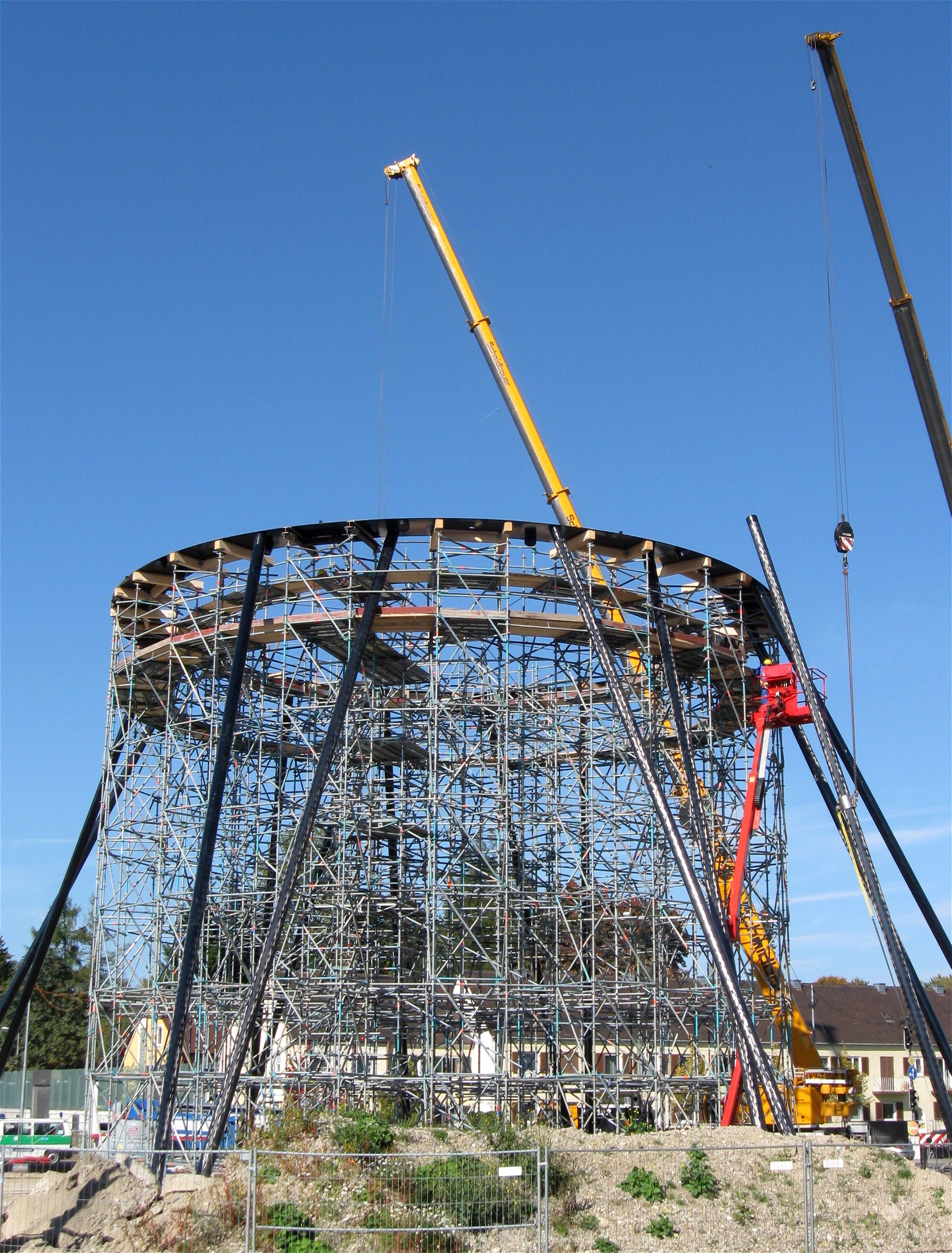
Construction of the lower part

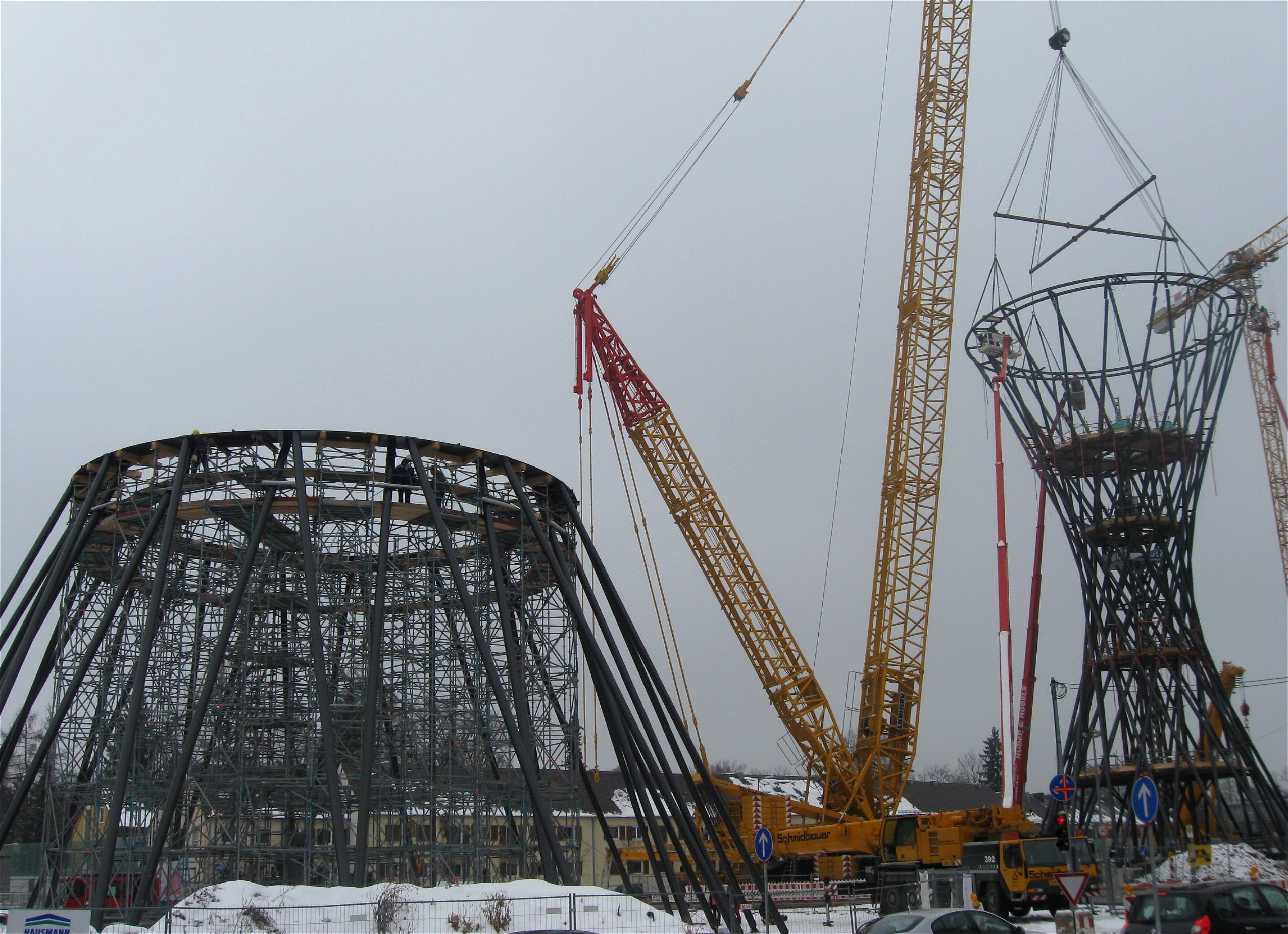
Raising of the top using a crane

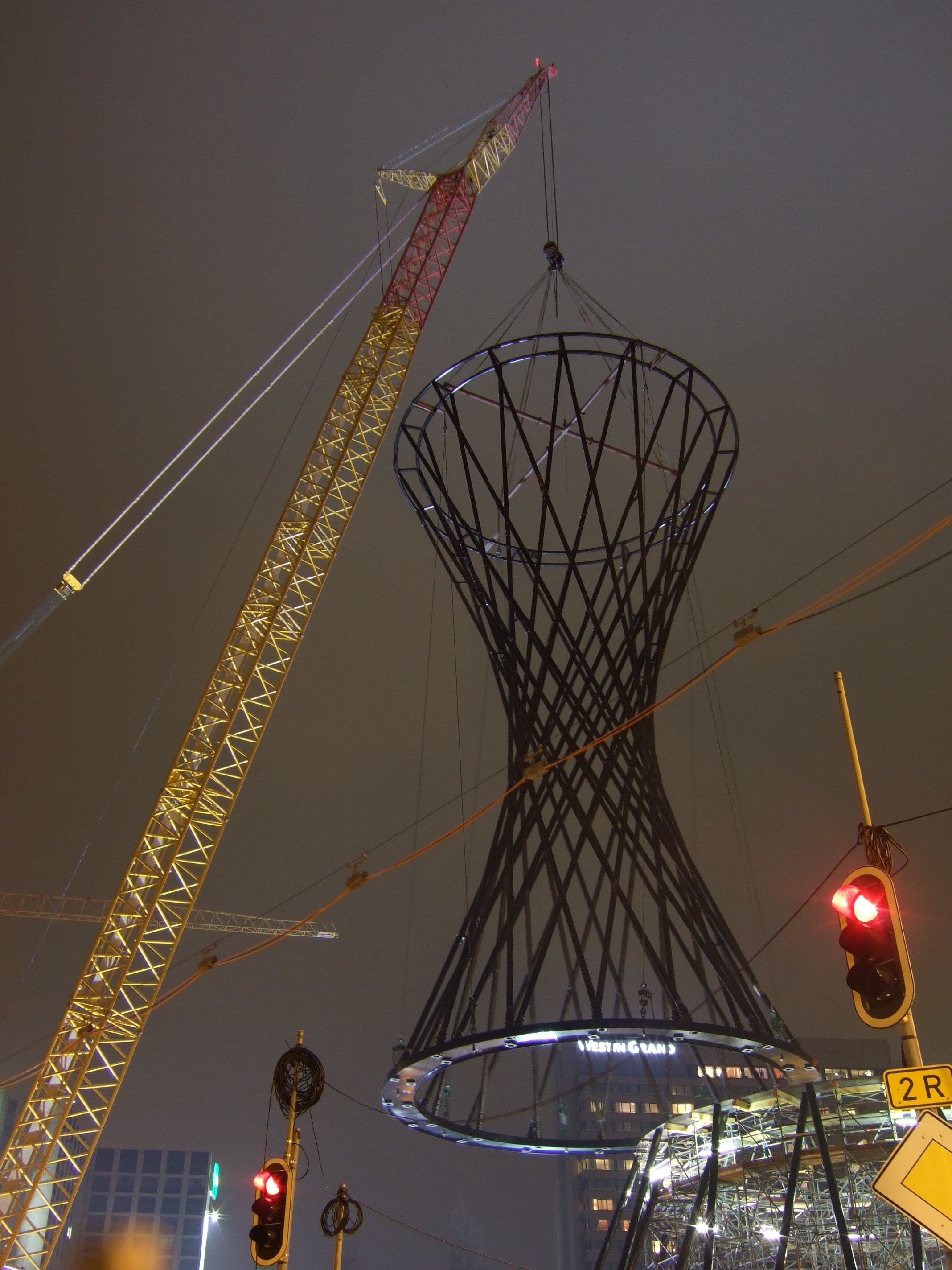
Addition of the top

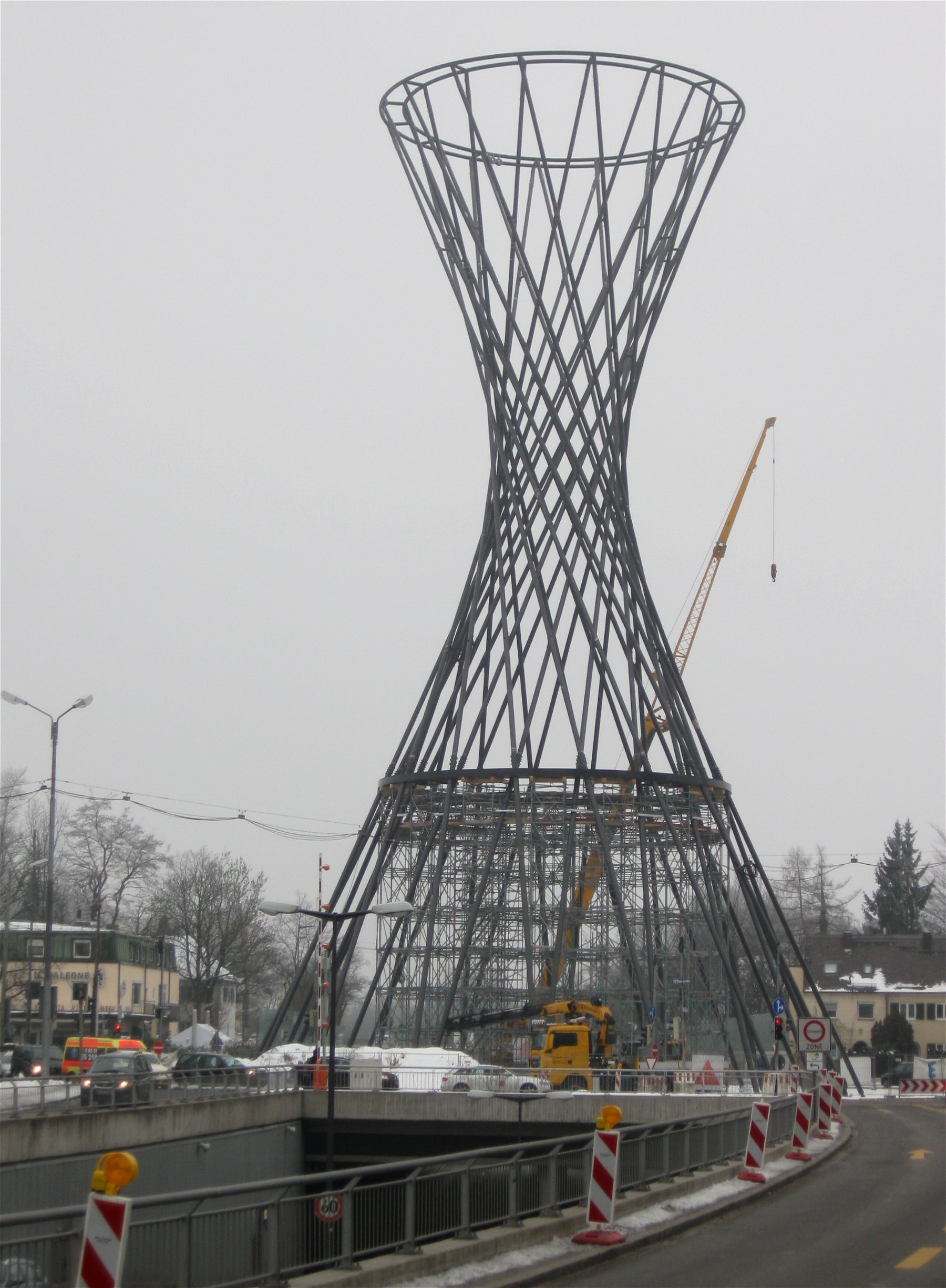
Mae West completed
