= Hazen Russell =

Hazen Russell (March 8, 1892 – November 14, 1983) was a fishery entrepreneur from New Brunswick. As a young man he moved to Newfoundland to work at the bank in Catalina. He spent the rest of his life living and working in Newfoundland. He founded the Bonavista Cold Storage Company and North Atlantic Fisheries Ltd. As the president of Job Brothers Ltd. he created the first factory ship in the world by refitting Blue Peter with a brine freezing system and a canning plant to pack salmon.
