= Slade (disambiguation) =

Slade are an English rock band.

Slade may also refer to:

== Organizations ==
- Slade Architecture, architecture and design firm

== Fiction ==
- "Slade" (short story), a 1970 short story by Stephen King
- Slade Wilson, aka Deathstroke, a DC Comics villain, known only as Slade in the Teen Titans animated series
- Slade Prison, a fictional prison in Porridge

== People ==
- Slade (surname)
- Slade Bolden (born 1999), American football player
- Slade Callaghan (born 1970), jockey in Thoroughbred horse racing
- Slade Cecconi (born 1999), American baseball player
- Slade Gorton (1928–2020), American politician
- Slade Griffin (born 1991), New Zealand rugby footballer
- Slade Norris (born 1985), American football linebacker
- Slade Willis (born 1950), Canadian football player

== Places ==
- Slade, Kentucky, in Powell County
- Slade, Swansea, a village in Wales
- Slade, a hamlet in the civil parish of Otterden, Kent, England
- Slade, a village and townland in County Wexford, Ireland
  - Slade Castle, a castle in Slade townland, County Wexford, Ireland
- Slade Avenue (Maryland), a long road primarily situated in Baltimore County, Maryland
- Slade Bay, beach near the village of Slade, south Wales
- Slade Brook, in Gloucestershire
- Slade Green, in south-east Greater London
- Slade Hall, a small Elizabethan manor house on Slade Lane in Longsight, Manchester, England
- Slade Hotel, Adrian, Minnesota, United States
- Slade (Greenwich ward), an electoral ward in Greenwich, London, England
- Slade (Kettering ward), an electoral ward in Kettering, Northamptonshire, England
- Slade Mudstone, a geologic formation in Wales
- Slade Point (South Australia), in the locality of Sceale Bay
- Slade School of Fine Art, UK art school

== Other uses ==
- SLADE, The Society of Lithographic Artists, Designers and Engravers, a defunct British printing industry trade union
- SLADE, a tool for editing Doom WADs
