= Simon Morris (politician) =

Newfoundland politician (1780–1857)

Simon Morris MHA

Member of the Newfoundland House of Assembly for Placentia-St. Mary's
- In office December 20, 1842 – November 20, 1848 Serving with John Dillon
- Preceded by: Patrick Doyle; John V. Nugent
- Succeeded by: John Delaney; Ambrose Shea

Personal details
- Born: c. 1780 Waterford, Ireland
- Died: February 5, 1857 (aged 76–77) St. John's, Newfoundland Colony
- Party: Liberal
- Children: Edward Morris
- Relatives: Patrick Morris (brother); John Kent (nephew)
- Occupation: Merchant

Simon Morris (ca 1780 – 1857) was an Irish-born politician in Newfoundland. He represented Placentia and St. Mary's in the Newfoundland House of Assembly from 1842 to 1848.

He was born in Waterford and came to Newfoundland in 1828 to join his brother Patrick, who was operating a trading firm. Morris also worked as cashier (general manager) for the Newfoundland Savings Bank.

His son Edward served in the Legislative Council of Newfoundland.
