= John Heywood (disambiguation) =

John Heywood was an English writer.

John Heywood may also refer to:

- John Heywood (MP), member of parliament for Lancaster in 1554
- John Heywood, pen name sometimes used by Australian poet John Kinsella
- John B. Heywood (engineer), British mechanical engineer
- John B. Heywood (photographer), American photographer
- John Heywood (weightlifter), Welsh weightlifter
- John Pemberton Heywood (1803–1877), banker from Liverpool, England

== See also ==
- John Haywood (disambiguation)
- John Hayward (disambiguation)
