= Henry David Winton =

English-Newfoundland newspaper publisher

Henry David Winton (June 10, 1793 – January 6, 1855) was an English-born printer and newspaper owner in Newfoundland.

The son of Reverend Robert Winton, he was born in Withycombe Raleigh, Exmouth. He was an apprentice to a printer and bookbinder in Dartmouth and continued in that trade in London. In 1816, Winton married Elizabeth Luttrell Nicholson. He came to Newfoundland in 1818 and opened a wholesale and retail stationery business in St. John's. In 1820, with a partner, he founded the Public Ledger and Newfoundland General Advertiser at St. John's. Under Winton, the paper criticized Roman Catholic politicians and helped sow discord between Catholic and Protestants in Newfoundland. In May 1835, Winton was attacked by a group of disguised men: he was knocked from his horse, one ear was cut with a knife and the other was sliced off.

He was strongly critical of Reformers. of responsible government for the colony and of the union of the assembly and legislative council introduced in 1842. In that same year, Winton ran unsuccessfully for the Burin seat in the assembly, losing to Clement Pitt Benning.

He died in St. John's at the age of 61. His son Henry took over the operation of the paper. His sons Robert and Francis were also newspaper owners.
