= John Haywood (cricketer) =

English cricketer (1878–1963)

John William Haywood (17 April 1878 – 2 February 1963) was an English cricketer active from 1901 to 1903 who played for Leicestershire. He was born in Harby, Leicestershire and died in Oakham. He appeared in three first-class matches as a righthanded batsman who bowled right arm medium pace. He scored 37 runs with a highest score of 16 and took four wickets with a best performance of two for 81.
