= Patrick Morris (merchant) =

Newfoundland politician (c. 1789–1849)

The Honourable Patrick Morris MHA
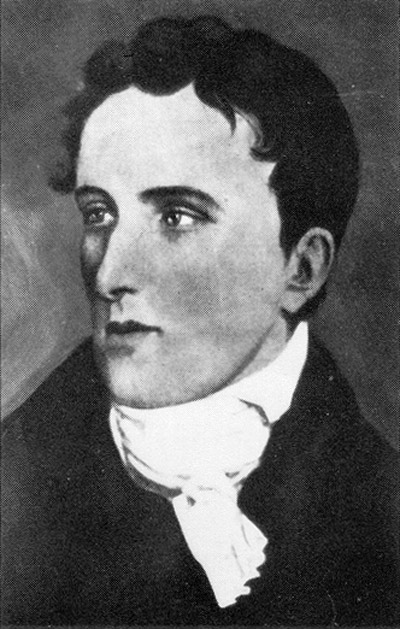

Member of the Newfoundland House of Assembly for St. John's
- In office November 15, 1836 – May 1840 Serving with William Carson and John Kent
- Preceded by: Patrick Kough
- Succeeded by: Laurence O'Brien

Personal details
- Born: c. 1789 Waterford, Ireland
- Died: August 22, 1849 (aged 59–60) St. John's, Newfoundland Colony
- Party: Liberal
- Spouse(s): Mary Foley (m. 1814) Frances Bullen (m. 1830)
- Children: 7
- Relatives: Simon Morris (brother); John Kent (nephew); Edward Morris (nephew)
- Occupation: Merchant, author

Patrick Morris (c. 1789 – August 22, 1849) was an Irish-born merchant, ship owner, farmer, author and politician in Newfoundland. He was one of the leading advocates for representative government in Newfoundland, which resulted in the creation of a bicameral legislature in 1832. He represented St. John's in the Newfoundland House of Assembly from 1836 to 1840.

== Early life and business ==
He was born in County Waterford and came to St. John's around 1804 as a clerk for a merchant from Waterford. Several years later, he went into business on his own. Passengers from Ireland, the main overseas source of seasonal labour, increased in concert with the volume of supplies. St John's controlled much of this inflated traffic. Morris's trade centered on the importation of passengers and provisions from his native Waterford and the return of cargoes of cod and oil. He did not restrict himself to the maritime but also timber, brick, limestone, and slate. He purchased a total of four brigs or deep-sea vessels between 1814 and 1825. Waterford gradually faded as a profitable source of supplies. Morris then sent his ships to Cork and Liverpool, and after 1825 to Hamburg and Danzig, where prices were half those in British ports.

== Politics and activism ==
Morris was president of the Newfoundland Agricultural Society. In 1828, he published a pamphlet, Arguments to prove the policy and necessity of granting to Newfoundland a constitutional government, which lobbied for local representative government in Newfoundland. In 1840, after leaving the House of Assembly, he was named to the Newfoundland Council as colonial treasurer.

== Personal life ==
Morris was married twice: to Mary Foley in 1814, by whom he had one child, and to Frances Bullen in 1830, by whom he had six children. He died at his home near St. John's in 1849, believed to be around 60 years of age.
