= Robert Job =

Canadian politician

Robert Job (c. 1794 – 1849) was a merchant and political figure in Newfoundland. He was elected to represent Bonavista Bay in the Newfoundland and Labrador House of Assembly in 1836.

He was born in England, the son of John Job and Sarah Bulley. Job began work with his father's firm in St. John's around 1810. By 1834, he was a partner in the St. John's branch of the firm Bulley and Job, which was employed in the cod fishery, the seal fishery and the export trade. He served on the Board of Road Commissioners and the Committee of Public Buildings. Job was a founding member of the first agricultural society in Newfoundland, the first chairman of the St. John's Gas Light Company, a director of the Bank of British North America and president of the St. John's Chamber of Commerce. The general election held in 1836 was declared void so Job never took his seat. He ran unsuccessfully for reelection in 1842. In 1843, he was appointed to the Executive Council. Job died in Liverpool in 1849.

His brother Thomas Bulley, also a partner in the family company, served as a member of the Newfoundland Council.
