= Patrick Doyle (businessman) =

Newfoundland politician

Patrick Doyle (c. 1777 – June 4, 1857) was born lived and died in Newfoundland. During his lifetime he was active in a number of areas involving commerce and politics. His first career was as a sea captain making voyages between St. John's and Bristol, England. By 1819 he owned a 46-ton sealing schooner, had acquired numerous properties on the St John's waterfront and was running a thriving import business. He maintained portions of his business interests throughout his life to provide him with the wealth and prosperity to pursue many other interests.

One of those interests involved the political life of Newfoundland. Between 1820 and 1832, he was a member of the political committee During that period he was part of the colony's struggle for representative government. The movement was led by William Carson and Patrick Morris. In 1837, he was legally elected to the Newfoundland House of Assembly.

At the end of his term in 1842, he became the police magistrate for St John's. In 1845 he was appointed a magistrate of the Court of Sessions, a position he held until his death.

His work with the community was extensive. A Roman Catholic, Doyle held a number of positions with the Benevolent Irish Society. This was a local organization that was aimed at improving education and reducing poverty. He also did work for charities involved with orphans and assisted the local church in finding a site for the new cathedral.

Doyle was a successful businessman who spent much of his time improving the situation for his fellow countrymen. He contributed greatly to Newfoundland during his lifetime.
