= Patrick Nowlan =

Newfoundland politician (1827–1896)

Patrick Nowlan MHA

Member of the Newfoundland House of Assembly for Harbour Main
- In office November 8, 1873 – November 6, 1882 Serving with Joseph Little
- Preceded by: John Kennedy
- Succeeded by: Richard MacDonnell
- In office November 7, 1859 – November 7, 1865 Serving with Charles Furey (1859–1861); Thomas Byrne (1861–1865)
- Preceded by: Thomas Byrne; William Talbot
- Succeeded by: Charles Furey; George Hogsett

Personal details
- Born: c. 1827 Burgeo, Newfoundland Colony
- Died: November 27, 1897 (aged 69–70) Brigus, Newfoundland Colony
- Party: Liberal (1859–1865, 1874–1882); Anti-Confederation (1873–1874)
- Spouse: Anne Mandeville
- Occupation: Merchant

Patrick Nowlan (c. 1827 – November 27, 1896) was a merchant and political figure in Newfoundland. He represented Harbour Main from 1859 to 1865 and from 1873 to 1882 in the Newfoundland House of Assembly.

He was born in Burgeo, where he became a trader and ship owner. Nowlan married Anne Mandeville. In the 1861 general election, the results of the election were set aside following violence at the polls; Nowlan and Thomas Byrne were later declared elected by a committee of the Newfoundland assembly.
