= Benjamin Slade =

Benjamin Slade may refer to:

- Sir Benjamin Slade, 7th Baronet (born 1946), baronet and businessman
- Ben Slade (born 1976), television personality
