= Glen Rubsamen =

American artist

- Born: 1957 (age 68–69); Hollywood, California
- Education: University of California, Los Angeles
- Spouse: Rita McBride
- Website: http://glenrubsamen.com/

Glen Rubsamen (born 1957) is a visual artist and writer, primarily working with painting and photography. Rubsamen splits his time between Los Angeles, California and Düsseldorf, Germany. Rubsamen is married to artist Rita McBride.

== Early life ==
Glen Rubsamen was born in Hollywood, California in 1957 to Gisela Roth/Rubsamen and Walter H. Rubsamen. He is the younger of two children. His sister Valerie Rubsamen was a professor of politics at Swarthmore College (retired) and author of numerous books and articles on media and the state in France. His father, Walter H. Rubsamen, was a professor of musicology at the University of California, Los Angeles, known primarily for his work on the literary sources of secular music in Italy in the fifteenth century and the history and politics of ballad opera, he traveled extensively for research with grants from various American institutions. His Mother Gisela Roth/Rubsamen is an art historian specializing in the Italian Baroque. Rubsamen earned his BA and MFA from the University of California, Los Angeles in 1978 and 1981 respectively.

== Books ==
Glen Rubsamen is the author and co-editor, with Rita McBride, of a variety of experimental artist publications, including Futureways, a group of short stories by different authors describing an art exhibition in the future; Those Useless Trees, a book about the relationship of trees to the new global urbanism; Rhynchophorus ferruginous, an investigation of a parasite that has caused the death of millions of primarily ornamental palm trees in the Near East and the Mediterranean and has had a profound effect on the cultural aesthetics of tourism; and Take All The Time You Need, a combination painting monograph and a quinquagenary agenda for organizing the next fifty years.

== Painting and photography ==
Glen Rubsamen's paintings and photographs are characterized by a documentary interest in compiling, like collectibles, situations in nature of great dramatic intensity in the romantic tradition, such as sunrises and sunsets, exuberant vegetation, or images of the apocalypse. Through brusque combinations of different perspectives and violent foreshortening of the objects and trees, Rubsamen shows us an uninhabited and almost aggressive world, an assaulted nature that makes us think of the devastating after-effects of a meteorological or technological catastrophe. These characteristics, combined with the absence of human presence, the tendency towards monochrome and the lack of spatio-temporal references create an atmosphere charged with austere quietude and spirituality. Rubsamen is the painter of a nature where the organic appears in artificial images.

== Galleries ==
Country	Name
Switzerland	Annemarie Verna Galerie
Switzerland	Mai 36 Galerie
Italy	Galleria Alfonso Artiaco
Italy	Valentina Bonomo
Germany	Cosar HMT
Sweden	Stene Projects
