= John William Hayward =

John William Hayward (1844–1913) was a Newfoundland artist and inventor. He was born July 18, 1844, in Harbour Grace to John Hayward and Flora Currie. His mother died in August, 1844. He also worked as a bank clerk in St. Johns, Newfoundland.

He did some important work about flags used to identify ships and signals:

Flag charts of the 1800s are much more numerous than those of the centuries before. However, and almost without exception, they were the province of one man, John William Hayward (1843-1913), a self-taught artist and son of a wealthy merchant family of the city. Along with landscape paintings and engraved vignettes of contemporary St. John’s life, Hayward produced many signal flag charts, many in watercolour, and some as mass-produced lithographed broadsheets complete with advertisements of prominent city businesses. Hayward’s charts showed many new businesses and families joining the ranks of prominence by acquiring their own house flags, and prominent they were. Families such as the Ayres, Bowrings, Bairds, and Harveys of St. John’s were perhaps more important to the commercial and social life of the city then than were the Eatons, Simpsons, or Gooderhams to Toronto, or the Rockefellers and Vanderbilts to New York. While "Hayward’s Flags" (as this aspect of his work is often called), may lose some accuracy to the researcher by their decorative Victorian exuberance, it is that same exuberance and his decorative depiction of the signal and commercial flags of St. John’s that gives important clues to the prominent place these flags played in the city’s life. Hayward’s charts bustle with the life of a busy day along the docks in the harbour.

He did also drawings and engravings. He was a self-taught artist.
