= John Hayward (Newfoundland politician) =

Newfoundland lawyer and politician (1819–1885)

The Honourable John Hayward MHA
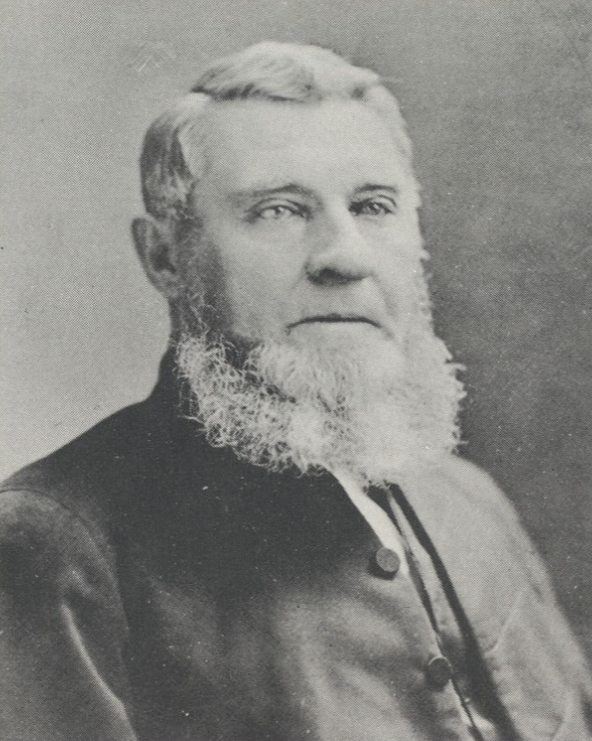

Member of the Newfoundland House of Assembly for Harbour Grace Conception Bay (1852–1855)
- In office November 18, 1852 – August 7, 1868 Serving with John Bemister (1852–1855); Edmund Hanrahan (1852–1855); William Talbot (1852–1855); James Prendergast (1855–1861); Henry J. Moore (1861–1865); William S. Green (1865–1868)
- Preceded by: Nicholas Molloy; Richard Rankin; James Prendergast
- Succeeded by: Joseph Godden

Personal details
- Born: c. 1819 Harbour Grace, Newfoundland Colony
- Died: March 13, 1885 (aged 65–66)
- Party: Conservative (1852–1855; 1861–1868); Liberal (1855–1861)
- Children: John William Hayward
- Occupation: Lawyer

John Hayward (c. 1819 – March 13, 1885) was a lawyer, judge and politician in Newfoundland. He served in the Newfoundland House of Assembly from 1852 to 1868.

== Early life and migration to the United States ==
Hayward was born and educated in Harbour Grace. He studied law with George Henry Emerson and was called to the Newfoundland bar in 1841. He served as chief clerk and registrar for the northern circuit court and as sub-collector of customs at Harbour Grace.

In 1849, John and his young family headed for Washington County, Wisconsin. They traveled during a week and a half. They took a boat from Newfoundland to New York City, then up the canals to Albany, New York, another boat to Buffalo, New York. They traveled to Wisconsin by wagon and bought a farm and had land cleared. After a few months, in a letter to his father-in-law, he seems full of optimism. In spite of that, he was back in Harbour Grace at the end of 1850, and was sub-collector of Customs in 1851.

== Politics ==
Hayward was elected to the assembly for Conception Bay in 1852 and for Harbour Grace in 1855 and again in 1859. He served as Solicitor General in the provincial cabinet until 1861. The results of the 1861 election in Harbour Grace were set aside due to violence at the polls; Hayward was re-elected in a by-election held later that year. He was elected again in 1865 and was named Solicitor General again. Hayward was opposed to the union with Canada proposed in 1868. He retired from politics in August of that year and was named an assistant justice in the Supreme Court of Newfoundland. Hayward retired from the bench due to illness in 1884 and died the following year.
