= John Slade (merchant) =

Canadian sea captain, shipowner, and merchant

John Slade (1719 – 17 February 1792) was a sea captain, shipowner and merchant who was a part of Newfoundland's development as an important trading destination in the fishing trade of the 18th century.
