= Jack Hayward (political scientist) =

English writer and academic (1931–2017)

Jack Ernest Shalom Hayward FBA (18 August 1931 – 8 December 2017) was an English writer and academic.

Until his death, he was the Professor of Politics at the University of Hull.

== Published works ==
- Jack Ernest Shalom Hayward (1983). Governing France: the one and indivisible republic. Weidenfeld and Nicolson. ISBN 978-0-297-78235-3.
- Jack Ernest Shalom Hayward (1986). The state and the market economy: industrial patriotism and economic intervention in France. Wheatsheaf Books. ISBN 978-0-7450-0012-1.
- Jack Ernest Shalom Hayward; Philip Norton (1986). The Political science of British politics. Wheatsheaf Books. ISBN 978-0-7450-0324-5.
