= Matthew W. Walbank =

Newfoundland lawyer and politician

Matthew William Walbank (September 29, 1821 – November 12, 1874) was an English-born lawyer and political figure in Newfoundland. He represented Bonavista Bay in the Newfoundland and Labrador House of Assembly from 1855 to 1859 and from 1861 to 1865.

He was born in Moretonhampstead, Devon, the son of Matthew William Walbank and Susan Arabella Keen. He studied law, came to St. John's in 1849 and practised law in partnership with William Whiteway during the 1850s. Walbank married Elizabeth Jane McLea. He was named registrar and chief clerk for the Supreme Court of Newfoundland in 1865. Walbank died in St. John's in 1874.
