= John Slade (politician) =

Newfoundland politician

John Slade (1819 – January 9, 1847) was a merchant and politician in Newfoundland. He represented Fogo in the Newfoundland House of Assembly from 1842 to 1847.

The son of Robert Slade, who was a merchant, he was born in Poole, Dorset. He began work at a young age with John Slade & Co., a firm established by his great uncle, John Slade. By 1842, he was manager for the firm's operations in Twillingate. Slade was elected to the Newfoundland House of Assembly at the age of 23, the youngest person ever elected to that assembly.

He died in Poole at the age of 28. and is buried in the churchyard of the parish church - St James. Inside the church is a memorial to the family "Sacred to the memory of JOHN SLADE merchant of this town who died 9 January 1847 aged 28 years. Also of ROBERT STANDLEY SLADE who died at Fogo in the island of Newfoundland February 21st 1846 aged 23 years. Also of ROBERT SLADE merchant and magistrate of this town, father of the above who died 3 January 1864 aged 68 years. His remains with those of his eldest son are interred in the churchyard near this place."
