= Billy Slade =

Welsh cricketer (1941–2019)

Personal information
- Full name: William Douglas Slade
- Born: 27 September 1941; Briton Ferry, Glamorgan, Wales
- Died: 22 December 2019 (aged 78)
- Batting: Right-handed
- Bowling: Right-arm medium

International information
- National side: Wales

Domestic team information
- Years: Team
- 1961–1967: Glamorgan

Career statistics
Competition	First-class	List A
Matches	67	4
Runs scored	1,482	52
Batting average	14.11	13.00
100s/50s	0/3	0/0
Top score	73*	28
Balls bowled	3,027	54
Wickets	32	0
Bowling average	46.65	–
5 wickets in innings	0	–
10 wickets in match	0	–
Best bowling	4/144	–
Catches/stumpings	100/–	2/–
- Source: Cricinfo, 26 October 2012

William Douglas Slade (27 September 1941 – 22 December 2019) was a Welsh cricketer. A right-handed batsman who bowled right-arm medium pace, he was born at Briton Ferry, Glamorgan.

== First-class career ==
Slade made his first-class debut for Glamorgan in the 1961 County Championship against Hampshire at St. Helen's, Swansea. In his first season, he made a further thirteen first-class appearances, scoring 370 runs at an average of 17.61, while recording his maiden half century against Leicestershire. However, in the following season he made just six first-class appearances, and struggled to break into Glamorgan's first eleven over the following three seasons, making eight first-class appearances in 1963, seven in 1964 and eight in 1965. In 1963 he made his List A debut against Somerset in the first-round of the Gillette Cup. Glamorgan progressed to the quarter-finals of the tournament, with Slade playing in Glamorgan's quarter-final defeat to Worcestershire.

In 1966, Slade appeared in fourteen first-class matches, twelve of which came in that season's County Championship. He scored 338 runs in the season, at an average of 13.52, and passed fifty just once, against Sussex. He also made a List A appearance in the 1966 Gillette Cup in a second-round defeat by Warwickshire. The 1967 season was to be his last in first-class cricket, with Slade making ten appearances, the last of which came against Middlesex. In his final season, he scored a total of 273 runs at an average of 15.16, with a high score of 42. He also made a single List A appearance in a 1967 Gillette Cup second-round defeat to Hampshire at the United Services Recreation Ground, Portsmouth. Throughout his time at Glamorgan, Slade had been unable to command a regular place in Glamorgan's starting eleven. He played a total of 67 first-class matches for the county, scoring 1,482 runs at an average of 14.11, with a high score of 73 not out against Derbyshire in 1963. He was part of the Glamorgan team which beat the Australians in 1964, just their second defeat to a county since 1912, Slade taking two close catches.

Slade was an exceptional fielder close to the wicket, usually at short leg. Don Shepherd said he had "fantastic hands". In 67 matches, he took 100 catches. He was also occasionally utilised as an off-spin bowler, taking 32 wickets at a bowling average of 46.65, with best figures of 4/144. In his four List A matches, he scored 52 runs at an average of 13.00, with a high score of 28.

== International career ==
Slade later captained Wales in the 1979 ICC Trophy against the Netherlands, Israel and the United States. Wales failed to progress from their group in the tournament, although they were not eligible for qualification for the 1979 World Cup even if they had won the event.

Slade coached cricket at Marlborough College, and in a number of other schools and clubs. He also ran a pub in the Vale of Neath. He suffered from dementia in his final years.
