= Thomas Byrne (Newfoundland politician) =

Newfoundland politician

Member of the House of Assembly for Harbour Main
- In office 1855–1859 Serving with William Talbot
- Preceded by: New District
- Succeeded by: Patrick Nowlan; Charles Furey

Personal details
- Party: Liberal

Thomas Byrne was a Newfoundland politician who represented the district of Harbour Main in the House of Assembly from 1855 to 1859.
