= Michael John Kelly =

Newfoundland politician (1815–1890)

Michael J. Kelly MHA

Member of the Newfoundland House of Assembly for Placentia-St. Mary's
- In office May 7, 1855 – November 7, 1859 Serving with John Delaney and George J. Hogsett
- Preceded by: Ambrose Shea
- Succeeded by: John English

Personal details
- Born: May 1815 St. John's, Newfoundland Colony
- Died: March 25, 1890 (aged 74) Brigus, Newfoundland Colony
- Party: Liberal
- Spouse: Bridget Doohan (m. 1842)
- Children: 1 daughter
- Occupation: School inspector

Michael John Kelly (May 1815 – March 25, 1890) was a political figure in Newfoundland. He represented Placentia and St. Mary's in the Newfoundland and Labrador House of Assembly from 1855 to 1859.

He was born in St. John's, the son of Gilbert Kelly and Margaret Knee. Kelly married Bridget Doohan in 1842. He served as acting colonial secretary in 1857. In the same year, he was named representative on the Roman Catholic board of education for Placentia district and acting fisheries superintendent. In 1858, Kelly was named inspector for Roman Catholic schools. He resigned his seat in the assembly but was sworn in again the following year. Kelly retired as a school inspector in 1879. He died in Brigus at the age of 74.
