= Samuel Slade =

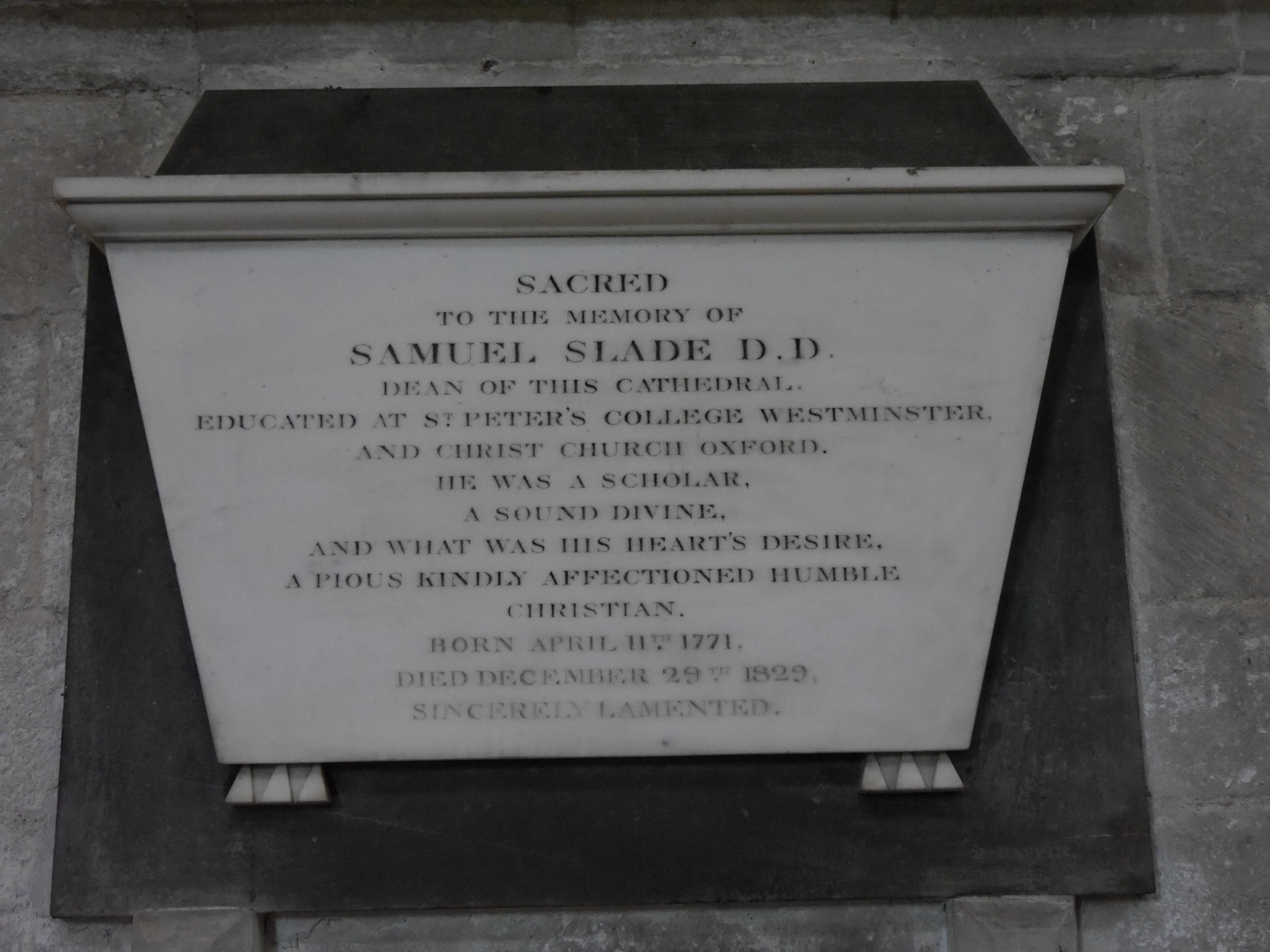
Memorial, Chichester Cathedral

Samuel Slade (1771–1829) was a Church of England clergyman, Dean of Chichester from 1824 until his death.

Samuel Slade was born on 11 April 1771. He was the son of Richard Slade, who was rector at Westwell, Oxfordshire from 1746 until his death, so Samuel may have been born in Westwell.

== Education ==
Slade was educated at St Peter's College, Westminster and elected to Christ Church, Oxford University in 1789, where he received his Doctorate of Divinity in 1796.

== Career ==
He became tutor to the Duke of Dorset, and in 1813 was first Chaplain to Lord Whitworth, then Lord-Lieutenant of Ireland. He was instituted Vicar of Staverton, Northamptonshire on 11 April 1815 and Rector of Hartfield, Sussex in 1817. On the 12 March 1824 he was granted the dignity dean of the Cathedral Church of Chichester, after the previous incumbent had been promoted to the bishopric of Gloucester. Samual Slade died on 29 December 1829, although it had been expected that he would have gone further in his career, if he had lived longer.

== Notes ==
Church of England titles
Preceded by Christopher Bethell	Dean of Chichester; 1824 – 1829	Succeeded by George Chandler
