= Rita McBride =

American artist and sculptor (born 1960)

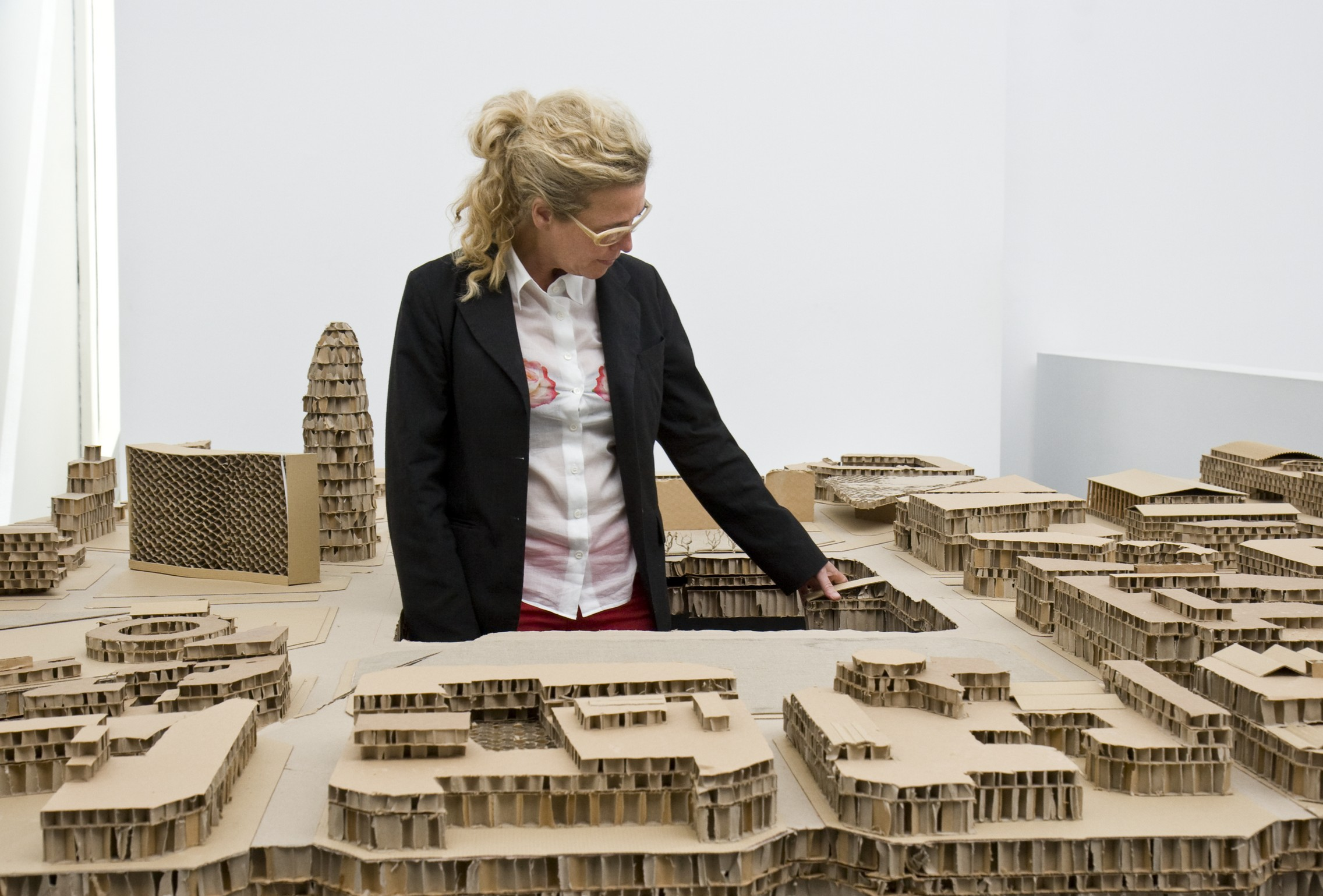
- Born: 1960 (age 65–66); Des Moines, Iowa
- Education: Bard College (BA), California Institute of the Arts (BFA)
- Known for: Director of the Kunstakademie Düsseldorf
- Notable work: Mae West
- Website: www.ritamcbride.net/index.html

Rita McBride (born 1960) is an American artist and sculptor. She is based in Los Angeles and Düsseldorf. Alongside her artistic practice, McBride is a professor at the Kunstakademie Düsseldorf, and served as its director until 2017. McBride is married to Glen Rubsamen, an American painter from Los Angeles.

Working at the intersection of architecture, design, and public space, McBride is known for her large scale works and installations, with her wider oeuvre incorporating performance, texts, and smaller scale sculptural work.

== Life ==
Rita McBride was born in Des Moines, Iowa in 1960. She received her BA from Bard College in New York in 1982 and her MFA from California Institute of the Arts in 1987, where she studied with Michael Asher and John Baldessari. After receiving her MFA, McBride began to exhibit her work widely initially with art galleries in Porto and Los Angeles. Her work has been the subject of more than seventy one-person exhibitions and twenty monographs.

== Work and commissions ==
McBride's practice is concerned not only with sculptural or architectural form, but likewise the situations and happenings which arise in the audience's relation to the works. Her most exhibited work, Arena (1997), for instance, is a modular structure which is assembled into a concave, arena-like seating area. First shown at the Witte de With in Rotterdam, Arena is activated by a calendar of programming curated by McBride and the host institution which range from lectures and artist talks to performance pieces by guest artists. McBride is the editor and co-author of a series of collaborative novels entitled Ways, each of which engage with a particular literary subgenre.

Major public commissions include Particulates, Dia Art Foundation, New York; Obelisk of Tutankhamum, Cologne, Germany (2017); Donkey's Way, Moenchengladbach (2016); Artifacts (C.W.D), P.S. 315, Queens, New York (2015); Bells and Whistles, The New School, New York, (2014).

Mae West (2011), one of McBride's most known public works, is a 52-meter tall carbon structure in Munich. Built for the Effnerplatz, a hub for public and private transit in eastern Munich, it remarkably includes access for a tram line to run through its latticed base. Mae West caused a number of debates within the city. The sculpture and its reception by the residents of the area is the subject of Day After Day, a film by Alexander Hick.

== Selected exhibitions ==
=== Selected solo exhibitions ===
- 2017–18: Particulates, Dia:Chelsea, New York
- 2017: Rita McBride: Explorer, Wiels, Brussels
- 2015–16: gesellschaft, kestnergesellschaft/Kunsthalle Düsseldorf
- 2014: Public Tilt, Museum of Contemporary Art San Diego
- 2013–14: Public Transaction, Museo Tamayo, Mexico City
- 2012: Public Tender, Museu d'Art Contemporani de Barcelona (MACBA), Spain
- 2010: Previously, Kunstmuseum Winterthur, Switzerland
- 2008: Public Works, Museum Abteiberg, Mönchengladbach, Germany
- 2008: Some Settlements, Konrad Fischer Galerie, Düsseldorf
- 2007: Rita McBride, Galleria Alfonso Artiaco, Naples
- 2004: Exhibition, SculptureCenter, Long Island City, New York
- 2002: Naked Came the Stranger, Kunstmuseum Liechtenstein, Vaduz
- 2000: Her House with the Upstairs in It, Deutscher Akademischer Austauschdienst Galerie (DAAD), Berlin
- 1999: Aloof and Incidental, Annemarie Verna Galerie and Mai 36 Galerie, Zürich
- 1997: The Donkey's Way and Piggybackback (in collaboration with Catherine Opie and Lawrence Weiner), Galeria Pedro Oliveira, Porto
- 1997: Hyperinclusion, OSMOS, Berlin
- 1997: Rita McBride, Alexander and Bonin, New York
- 1997: Arena & National Chain, Witte de With, Rotterdam
- 1994: Backsliding, sideslipping, one Great Leap and the "forbidden", Michael Klein Gallery, New York
- 1990: Rita McBride New Work, Margo Leavin Gallery, Los Angeles
- 1989: Rita McBride, Galeria Atlântica. Porto

=== Selected group exhibitions ===
- 2017–18: Studio for Propositional Cinema | in relationship to a Spectator, kestenergesellschaft, Hannover
- 2016: EVERYTHING ARCHITECTURE, BOZAR, Centre for Fine Arts, Brussels
- 2016: Liverpool Biennial 2016
- 2011: Making Is Thinking, Witte de With, Rotterdam
- 2007: The World as a Stage, Tate Modern, London and Institute of Contemporary Art, Boston
- 2003: Living Inside the Grid, New Museum, New York
- 2002: Taipei Biennial 2002: Great Theatre of the World, Taipei Fine Art Museum
- 2000: What If: Art on the Verge of Architecture and Design, Moderna Museet, Stockholm
- 1998: Where: Allegories of Site in Contemporary Art, Whitney Museum of American Art at Champion, Stamford, CT
- 1994: Breakdown, Museum of Contemporary Art, San Diego
- 1991: There's no There, There, Indianapolis Museum of Art

== Collections ==
- Ellipse Foundation, Alcoitão/Cascais
- Museu d'Art Contemporani de Barcelona
- Bundeskunstsammlung Zeitgenössischer Kunst, Bonn
- The Art Institute of Chicago
- Museum Ludwig, Cologne
- Des Moines Art Center, Iowa
- FRAC Bourgogne, Dijon
- Kunstsammlung Nordrhein-Westfalen, Düsseldorf
- Niedersächsische Sparkassenstiftung, Hannover
- San Diego Museum of Contemporary Art, La Jolla, California
- Hammer Museum, Los Angeles
- Los Angeles County Museum of Art, Los Angeles
- Museum of Contemporary Art, Los Angeles
- De Vleeshal, Middelburg, Netherlands
- Museum Abteiberg, Mönchengladbach
- New York Public Library
- Queens Museum of Art, New York
- Whitney Museum of American Art, New York
- Neues Museum, Nuremberg
- FRAC Île-de-France, Paris
- Museu de Serralves, Porto
- Witte de With Center for Contemporary Art, Rotterdam
- The Achenbach Foundation, San Francisco
- De Young Museum, San Francisco
- Legion of Honor, San Francisco
- Kunstmuseum St. Gallen
- De Pont Foundation for Contemporary Art, Tilburg
- Kunstmuseum Liechtenstein, Vaduz
- Institut d'Art Contemporain, Villeurbanne
- Wake Forest University Collection, Winston-Salem, North Carolina
- Kunstmuseum Winterthur
- Kunsthaus Zürich

== Bibliography ==
- Rita McBride: Public Works, 1988 – 2015. Texts by Gina Ashcraft, Gregor Jansen, Mark von Schlegell, Susanne Titz, and Christina Végh. Hannover, Kestner Gesellschaft; Kunsthalle Düsseldorf; Cologne; Verlag der Buchhandlung Walther König, 2016 ISBN 978-3-86335-850-1
- Fernández-Galiano, Luis, Mark Wigley, Bartomeu Marí and Anne Pöhlmann. Rita McBride. Oferta pública / Public Tender. Barcelona: Museu d'Art Contemporani de Barcelona (MACBA), 2012 ISBN 978-84-92505-62-3
- Schwarz, Dieter, Daniel Kurjakovic, and Iris Wien. Previously. Winterthur: Kunstmuseum Winterthur, 2010
- McBride, Rita. Explorer. London: Occasional Papers, 2018 ISBN 978-0-9954730-2-7
