= Joshua George Falle =

Newfoundland politician

Member of the House of Assembly for Burin
- In office 1848–1852
- Preceded by: Clement Pitt Benning
- Succeeded by: Clement Pitt Benning

Joshua George Falle was a Newfoundland politician representing the district of Burin in the House of Assembly from 1848 to 1852.
