= Laurence O'Brien =

Irish-Newfoundlander politician and merchant

The Honourable Laurence O'Brien MHA MLC

1st President of the Legislative Council of Newfoundland
- In office June 18, 1855 – April 28, 1870
- Prime Minister: Philip Francis Little; John Kent; Hugh Hoyles; Frederick Carter; Charles Fox Bennett
- Governor: Sir Charles Henry Darling; Sir Alexander Bannerman; Anthony Musgrave; Stephen John Hill
- Preceded by: Position established
- Succeeded by: Edward Morris

Member of the Legislative Council of Newfoundland
- In office 1850 – April 28, 1870
- Appointed by: John Le Marchant

Member of the Newfoundland House of Assembly for St. John's
- In office May 1840 – 1850 Serving with William Carson (1840–1843); John Kent (1840–1842, 1848–1850); John V. Nugent (1842–1848); Robert J. Parsons (1843–1850)
- Preceded by: Patrick Morris
- Succeeded by: Philip Francis Little

Personal details
- Born: 1792 Clashmore, County Waterford, Ireland
- Died: April 28, 1870 (aged 77–78) St. John's, Newfoundland Colony
- Party: Liberal
- Spouse: Margaret Manning (m. 1853)
- Relatives: Lawrence O'Brien Furlong (grandson)
- Occupation: Merchant, mechanic, publican

Laurence O'Brien (1792 – April 28, 1870) was an Irish-born merchant and politician in Newfoundland. He represented St. John's in the Newfoundland and Labrador House of Assembly from 1841 to 1850 as a Liberal.

He was born in Clashmore, County Waterford and came to Newfoundland sometime between 1808 and 1810, later establishing himself in St. John's the company of Lawrence O'Brien and Company, a wholesale and retail trading company. O'Brien owned a wharf, warehouses and a retail store, and was also the owner of several trading ships. He was also involved in the seal fishery. He was involved in the formation of the Bank of Newfoundland and was a promoter of the Union Bank. In 1832, he married Margaret Manning. He was first elected to the Newfoundland assembly in an 1840 by-election held after Patrick Morris was named to the colony's Council. In 1843, O'Brien was named to the Executive Council. He resigned his seat in the assembly in 1850 after he was named to the Legislative Council. O'Brien was named president for the Legislative Council and Executive Council in 1855. He served as colonial administrator for Newfoundland in 1863. O'Brien died near St. John's in 1870.
