= Bill Slade =

English football manager

Personal information
- Date of birth: 1898
- Place of birth: Walsall, England
- Date of death: 1968

Managerial career
- Years: Team
- 1931: Coventry City (caretaker)
- 1932–1934: Walsall

William Slade (1898 – 1968) was an English football manager who took charge at Coventry City and Walsall.

== Biography ==
Slade played amateur football for a number of minor teams, before he was appointed a director at Coventry City in 1922, aged just 24. In 1931 he was made caretaker manager of the Third Division South club, after the sacking of Jimmy McIntyre.

In February 1932, he became manager of Walsall. He forged a strong link between Coventry and Walsall, and took Bill Coward, Chris Ball, Bill Sheppard and Freddie Lee from Highfield Road to Fellows Park. The club's kit was also changed to a blue and white strip for an historic match against an all-conquering First Division Arsenal in the FA Cup in January 1933; the "Saddlers" achieved a famous 2–0 victory, and Slade's entire front line that day had previously played for Coventry. It was reported that the Arsenal paid more for their player's boots than Slade did for his entire team. The match is described by the Walsall F.C. website as "one of the most significant days in our history". The club finished fifth in the Third Division North in 1932–33, and fourth in 1933–34, however Slade was sacked after a poor start to 1934–35. He died sometime in 1968.
