= James Seaton (Newfoundland politician) =

Canadian politician

James Seaton (1805–1876) was a journalist and political figure in Newfoundland. He represented Burgeo-LaPoile in the Newfoundland and Labrador House of Assembly from 1859 to 1860.

He was born in Moulin, Perthshire, Scotland on 29 May 1805 [Scotland's Births and Baptisms, 1564-1950], son of Alexander Seaton and Margaret Kennedy. He emigrated from Scotland to Quebec before 1836, moving to Newfoundland before 1846 where he took up journalism and printing.

He was editor of the St. John's Morning Courier from 1846 to 1849 and then was editor of the Times and General Commercial Gazette for six months. In 1856, he founded the Newfoundland Express and served as editor until 1876. Seaton also founded the Weekly Express which operated from 1858 to 1859. He resigned his seat in the Newfoundland assembly in 1860.

He died 1 August 1876 in St. John, Newfoundland and is buried in the St. Johns General Protestant Cemetery (Find-a-Grave)
