= Richard Rankin (politician) =

Newfoundland politician

Member of the House of Assembly for Conception Bay
- In office 1848–1852 Serving with Nicholas Molloy; Edmund Hanrahan; James Luke Prendergast
- Preceded by: Thomas Ridley; John Munn; Edward Hanarahan; James Luke Prendergast
- Succeeded by: John Bemister; Edmund Hanrahan; John Hayward; Willaim Talbot

Personal details
- Party: Conservative

Richard Rankin was a Newfoundland politician who represented the district of Conception Bay in the House of Assembly from 1848 to 1852.

In the early 1800s, he established one of the first mercantile businesses in Lower Island Cove.
