= Thomas Bulley Job =

Newfoundland politician

Thomas Bulley Job (1806 – November 30, 1878) was an English-born merchant and political figure in Newfoundland. He represented Trinity Bay in the Newfoundland and Labrador House of Assembly from 1846 to 1852 as a Conservative.

He was born in Teignmouth, Devon, the son of John Job, Sr. and Sarah Bulley. With his brother Robert, he operated the St. John's branch of the firm Bulley and Job, which had been founded by his father with a partner. Job was named to the Legislative Council of Newfoundland in 1852, serving until the introduction of responsible government in 1855.

Job moved to Liverpool shortly afterwards, where he served on the town council from 1858 to 1864. He also was a borough justice and member of the Dock Board.

== Personal life ==
In 1834, Job married Jessie, the daughter of William Carson. They had two children, a daughter, Sophia Job (b. 1843), and a son, Thomas Raffles Job (1837–1917). T.R. Job's son, Robert Brown Job, was the oldest elected member of the Newfoundland National Convention.

Job died in Liverpool in 1878.
