= George Henry Emerson (Twillingate and Fogo) =

Newfoundland politician (1798–1889)

The Honourable George Henry Emerson MHA MLC

Solicitor General
- In office 1855–1857
- Premier: Philip Little
- Preceded by: Portfolio established
- Succeeded by: John Hayward

Member of the Legislative Council of Newfoundland
- In office June 13, 1855 – 1859
- Nominated by: Philip Little
- Appointed by: Sir Charles Darling
- Succeeded by: Robert J. Pinsent

Member of the Newfoundland House of Assembly for Twillingate and Fogo
- In office November 20, 1848 – May 7, 1855
- Preceded by: John Slade
- Succeeded by: William Ellis; Thomas Knight

Personal details
- Born: 1798 Windsor, Nova Scotia
- Died: July 3, 1889 (aged 90–91) St. John's, Newfoundland Colony
- Party: Liberal
- Children: Prescott Emerson
- Relatives: Hugh A. Emerson (brother); George H. Emerson (grandson); Edward Emerson (great-grandson)
- Occupation: Lawyer

George Henry Emerson (1798 – July 3, 1889) was a lawyer and political figure in Newfoundland. He represented Twillingate and Fogo in the Newfoundland and Labrador House of Assembly from 1848 to 1855.

== Legal and political career ==
He was born in Windsor, Nova Scotia and came to Newfoundland in 1830. Emerson was called to the bar in 1831. He served as a member of the Legislative Council from 1855 to 1859, serving as solicitor general from 1855 to 1857. Emerson died in St. John's in 1889.

His son Prescott and his brother Hugh were also lawyers and both served in the Newfoundland assembly.
