= John Bemister =

Newfoundland politician (1815–1892)

The Honourable John Bemister MHA

Colonial Secretary
- In office 1865–1869
- Premier: Frederick Carter
- Preceded by: Robert Carter (acting)
- Succeeded by: Robert Alsop

Receiver General
- In office February 1862 – 1869
- Premier: Hugh Hoyles; Frederick Carter
- Preceded by: Thomas Glen
- Succeeded by: Thomas Glen

Member of the Newfoundland House of Assembly for Bay de Verde Conception Bay (1852–1855)
- In office November 18, 1852 – April 5, 1870 Serving with Edmund Hanrahan, John Hayward, and William Talbot (as MHAs for Conception Bay)
- Preceded by: Nicholas Molloy; Richard Rankin (as MHAs for Conception Bay)
- Succeeded by: James J. Rogerson

Personal details
- Born: c. 1815 Carbonear, Newfoundland Colony
- Died: December 19, 1892 (aged 76–77) Harbour Grace, Newfoundland Colony
- Party: Conservative
- Spouse: Jane Taylor (m. 1839)
- Children: 4 daughters
- Occupation: Merchant

John Bemister (c. 1815 – December 19, 1892) was a merchant and political figure in Newfoundland. He represented Conception Bay from 1852 to 1855 and Bay de Verde from 1855 to 1869 in the Newfoundland and Labrador House of Assembly.

== Biography ==
He was born in Carbonear, the son of William Willis Bemister and Ann Howell. He was first employed as clerk and bookkeeper in his father's firm and then operated branches in New Perlican on Trinity Bay and in Carbonear. In 1839, he married Jane Taylor. He was named to the Executive Council in 1861 and became receiver general in 1862. After he was reelected in 1869, he resigned his seat to become sheriff for the Northern District, retiring in 1891. Bemister died in Harbour Grace the following year.
