= Nicholas Molloy =

Newfoundland politician

Doctor Nicholas Molloy

Member of the House of Assembly for Conception Bay
- In office 1848–1852 Serving with Richard Rankin, Edmund Hanrahan, and James Luke Prendergast
- Preceded by: John Munn; Thomas Ridley; Edmund Hanrahan; James Luke Prendergast
- Succeeded by: William Talbot; John Hayward; John Bemister; Edmund Hanrahan

Nicholas Molloy was a Newfoundland Politician who served in the House of Assembly for the Liberal Party from 1848 until 1852 in the District of Conception Bay.
