= Robert John Parsons =

Newfoundland politician (1802–1883)

Robert J. Parsons MHA

Member of the Newfoundland House of Assembly for St. John's East St. John's (1843–1855)
- In office 1843 – November 9, 1878 Serving with John V. Nugent (1843–1848); Laurence O'Brien (1843–1850); John Kent (1848–1869); Philip Little (1850–1855); Peter Winser (1855); John Kavanagh (1857–1869); James Jordan (1869–1873); William P. Walsh (1869–1873); John J. Dearin (1873–1878); Robert J. Kent (1873–1878)
- Preceded by: William Carson
- Succeeded by: Robert J. Parsons Jr.

Personal details
- Born: c. 1802 Harbour Grace, Newfoundland Colony
- Died: June 20, 1883 (aged 80–81) St. John's, Newfoundland Colony
- Party: Liberal (1843–1869, 1874–1878); Anti-Confederation (1869–1874)
- Spouse: Eliza Flood (m. 1835)
- Children: Robert J. Parsons Jr.
- Occupation: Journalist

Robert John Parsons (c. 1802 – June 20, 1883) was a journalist and politician in Newfoundland. He represented St. John's East in the Newfoundland and Labrador House of Assembly from 1843 to 1878.

== Politics and legacy ==
He was born in Harbour Grace. Parsons apprenticed as a printer with the Royal Gazette in St. John's and was foreman in Henry David Winton's printing office for six years. He became managing editor for the Newfoundland Patriot, becoming owner and editor in 1840. In 1835, he married Eliza Flood. Parsons died in St. John's in 1883.

His son Robert John Parsons, Jr. also served in the Newfoundland assembly.
