= John Delaney (meteorologist) =

Newfoundland meteorologist and politician

Member of the House of Assembly for Placentia-St. Mary's
- In office 1848–1852 Serving with Ambrose Shea
- Preceded by: John Dillon; Simon Morris
- Succeeded by: George James Hogsett; Ambrose Shea
- In office 1855–1860 Serving with Michael John Kelly (1855–1859); George James Hogsett (1855–1860); J. W. English (1860–1860)

Personal details
- Born: 1811 Ireland
- Died: April 26, 1883 (aged 71–72) St. John's, Newfoundland Colony
- Spouse: Elizabeth Troy

John Delaney (1811 – April 26, 1883) was an Irish-born civil servant, meteorologist and political figure in Newfoundland. He represented Placentia and St. Mary's in the Newfoundland and Labrador House of Assembly from 1848 to 1852 and from 1855 to 1860 as a Liberal.

He married Elizabeth Troy, the sister of Father Edward Troy, before coming to St. John's in 1831. Delaney was door-keeper for the House of Assembly from 1835 to 1843. In 1852, he was named keeper of the House of Assembly and, in 1853, surveyor of roads. He played an active role in the passing of the Postal Act in 1851. Delaney was defeated when he ran for reelection in 1852. In 1860, he was named postmaster general; Delaney improved mail service in Newfoundland, introducing delivery to all parts of the island and door-to-door delivery in St. John's. From 1857 to 1864 and from 1871 to 1873, Delaney, with assistance from his sons, recorded weather observations at St. John's and submitted them to the Smithsonian Institution as part of a record of North American climate. He also established six weather stations staffed by volunteers to record weather data to the Meteorological Office of Canada. In 1873, he was named a fellow of the Royal Meteorological Society. Delaney died in St. John's in 1883.
