= Peter Winser =

Newfoundland politician

Peter Winser (ca 1781 – October 11, 1865) was a merchant and political figure in Newfoundland. He represented Ferryland in the Newfoundland and Labrador House of Assembly from 1836 to 1842 and from 1848 to 1855.

Winser is thought to have been born in England. He came to Aquaforte around 1815, where he established himself as a merchant. Winser was defeated when he ran for reelection in 1842. He resigned his seat in the assembly in 1855 after he was named a magistrate, serving in that function until 1863, when he was forced to retire after Edmund Hanrahan was named magistrate at Ferryland.
