= Philip Francis Little =

Newfoundland politician (1824–1897)

The Honourable Philip Francis Little
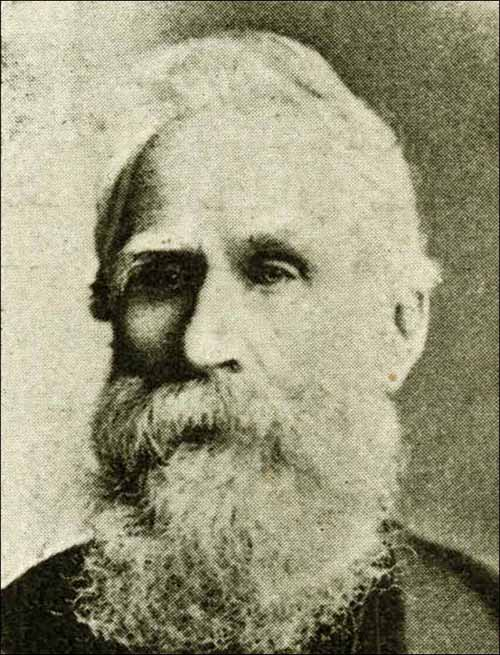

1st Premier of Newfoundland
- In office May 7, 1855 – July 15, 1858
- Monarch: Victoria
- Governor: Charles Henry Darling; Alexander Bannerman
- Preceded by: Office established
- Succeeded by: John Kent

Member of the Newfoundland House of Assembly for St. John's West St. John's (1850–1855)
- In office 1850–1858 Serving with John Kent (1850–1855); Robert J. Parsons (1850–1855); John Fox (1855–1858); Ambrose Shea (1855–1858)
- Preceded by: Laurence O'Brien
- Succeeded by: J. J. Gearin

Personal details
- Born: Philip Francis Little; 1824 Charlottetown, Prince Edward Island Colony
- Died: October 21, 1897 (aged 72–73) Monkstown, Dublin, Ireland
- Party: Liberal
- Spouse: Mary Jane Holdright (m. 1864)
- Children: 11, including Patrick
- Relatives: Joseph Little (brother); Patrick J. Scott (brother-in-law); Ciarán Cuffe (great-grandson)
- Occupation: Lawyer

Philip Francis Little (1824 – October 21, 1897) was the first Premier of Newfoundland between 1855 and 1858.

== Early life and legal career ==
Little was born in Charlottetown, Prince Edward Island to Cornelius Little and Brigid Little (née Costin). He studied law there with Charles Young and was admitted to the bar in 1844.

He emigrated to Newfoundland in 1846 and articled in law, the first Roman Catholic to practise law in St. John's. His strong views on responsible government, his connections in St. John's Catholic society, and his ability to unite disparate elements of the Liberal Party propelled him to a leadership role in politics.

== Politics ==
Little led the charge for responsible government along with John Kent. After it was granted in 1854, he went on to run a successful campaign as leader of the predominantly Roman Catholic Liberal Party. He became Newfoundland's first Premier in 1855 and served concurrently as the colony's Attorney-General. D.W. Prowse would record that it was, "as near to perfection as possible". With the period of 1855-1857 described as being "the sunshine of prosperity." Little only remained in office until July 15, 1858, when he resigned to be succeeded by John Kent.

He resigned in 1858 saying "I go now before the milk of Human kindness goes sour for me". He was right in that Newfoundland was about to enter an era of sectarian strife.

He was appointed as assistant justice on the Supreme Court of Newfoundland in September 1858, briefly serving as acting Chief Justice in 1859. In 1861, riots broke out over disputed election results from Harbour Grace, and Little played a prominent role in dispersing and calming the crowds.

== Personal life ==
He married Mary Jane Holdright, from a wealthy Anglo-Irish family, in 1864. Philip Little retired to Ireland in 1868 and worked for the Home Rule movement there. He and his wife had 13 children, the youngest of whom, Patrick, became a politician. Philip Francis Little died at age 73 in 1897 in Monkstown, Dublin.

== Bibliography ==
- Biography at The Canadian Encyclopedia
