= William Talbot (Newfoundland politician) =

Newfoundland politician (1792–1873)

William Talbot MHA

Member of the Newfoundland House of Assembly for Harbour Main
- In office May 7, 1855 – November 7, 1859 Serving with Thomas Byrne
- Preceded by: District established
- Succeeded by: Charles Furey; Patrick Nowlan

Member of the Newfoundland House of Assembly for Conception Bay
- In office November 18, 1852 – May 7, 1855
- Preceded by: Nicholas Molloy; Richard Rankin
- Succeeded by: District redistributed

Personal details
- Born: c. 1792 County Kilkenny, Ireland
- Died: April 27, 1873 (aged 80–81) Harbour Grace, Newfoundland Colony
- Party: Liberal
- Children: Thomas Talbot
- Occupation: Farmer

William Talbot (c. 1792 – April 28, 1873) was an Irish-born Newfoundland farmer, fisherman and politician. He served in the Newfoundland House of Assembly from 1852 to 1859.

Originally from County Kilkenny, Ireland, Talbot emigrated to the Newfoundland Colony around 1814 and owned a farm in Harbour Grace. He was elected to the assembly for Conception Bay in 1852 and then was elected for Harbour Main in 1855. Around 1859, he retired from politics due to failing eyesight. He died on April 28, 1873 in Harbour Grace.

His son Thomas Talbot also served in the Newfoundland assembly.
