= Clement Pitt Benning =

Newfoundland politician

Clement Pitt Benning (1785 – April 30, 1865) was a merchant, magistrate and political figure in Newfoundland. He represented Burin in the Newfoundland and Labrador House of Assembly from 1842 to 1848 and from 1852 to 1859 as a Liberal.

He was probably born in Ireland and came to Placentia Bay in 1804 as an agent for William Spurrier of Poole. When Spurrier's firm failed in 1829, Benning went into business on his own. He was also employed as a building contractor and was a partner in a ferry between Burin and Placentia. In 1831, he was named conservator of the peace for Burin and Placentia. In 1859, he was named a stipendiary magistrate for Lamaline. Benning died in Burin in 1865.
