= 12th General Assembly of Newfoundland =

Colony of Newfoundland legislature

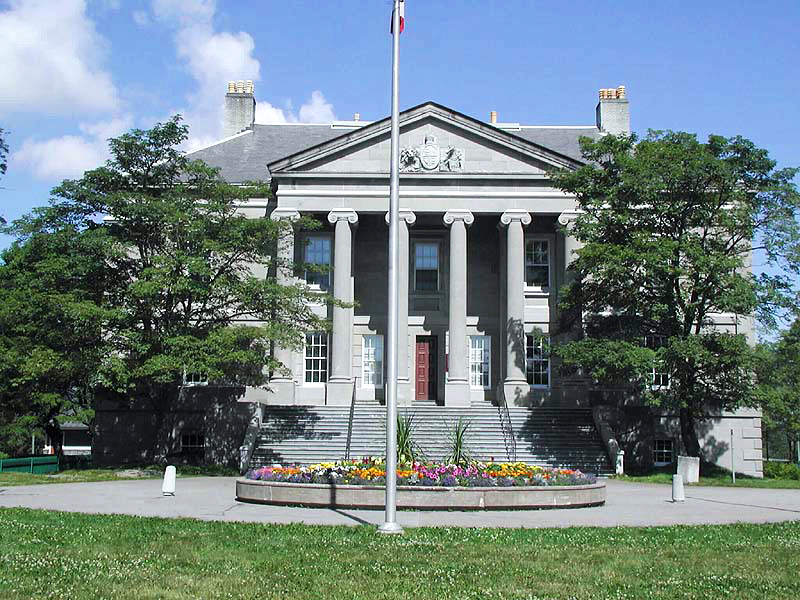
- Colonial Building seat of the Newfoundland government and the House of Assembly from January 28, 1850, to July 28, 1959.

History
- Founded: 1874
- Disbanded: 1878
- Preceded by: 11th General Assembly of Newfoundland
- Succeeded by: 13th General Assembly of Newfoundland

Leadership
- Premier: Frederick Carter
- Premier: William Whiteway since 1878

Elections
- Last election: 1874 Newfoundland general election

The members of the 12th General Assembly of Newfoundland were elected in the Newfoundland general election held in November 1874. The general assembly sat from 1875 to 1878.

The Conservative Party led by Frederick Carter formed the government. After Carter resigned in early 1878, William Whiteway became party leader and Premier.

Prescott Emerson was chosen as speaker, serving until 1877. James S. Winter succeeded Emerson as speaker.

Sir Stephen John Hill served as colonial governor of Newfoundland until 1876. Sir John Hawley Glover succeeded Hill as governor.

== Members of the Assembly ==
The following members were elected to the assembly in 1874:

Member	Electoral district	Affiliation	First elected / previously elected
James J. Rogerson	Bay de Verde	Conservative	1870
John H. Warren	Bonavista Bay	Conservative	1874
Charles Bowring	Bonavista Bay	Conservative	1873
Alexander J.W. McNeilly	Bonavista Bay	Conservative	1873
Prescott Emerson	Burgeo-La Poile	Conservative	1869
Charles R. Ayre	Burin	Conservative	1873
James S. Winter	Burin	Conservative	1873
John Rorke	Carbonear	Conservative	1863
Richard Raftus	Ferryland	Anti-Confederate	1873
James G. Conroy	Ferryland	Anti-Confederate	1874
Robert Alexander	Fortune Bay	Conservative	1874
Ambrose Shea	Harbour Grace	Conservative	1848, 1874
Joseph Godden	Harbour Grace	Conservative	1865, 1874
Joseph I. Little	Harbour Main	Anti-Confederate	1867
Patrick Nowlan	Harbour Main	Anti-Confederate	1859, 1873
Charles Fox Bennett	Placentia and St. Mary's	Anti-Confederate	1869
James Collins	Placentia and St. Mary's	Anti-Confederate	1873
Michael E. Dwyer	Placentia and St. Mary's	Anti-Confederate	1874
Nathaniel Rabbits	Port de Grave	Conservative	1874
Robert J. Kent	St. John's East	Anti-Confederate	1873
Robert John Parsons	St. John's East	Anti-Confederate	1843
John J. Dearin	St. John's East	Anti-Confederate	1873
Lewis Tessier	St. John's West	Anti-Confederate	1873
Maurice Fenelon	St. John's West	Anti-Confederate	1873
Patrick J. Scott	St. John's West	Anti-Confederate	1873
William Whiteway	Trinity Bay	Conservative	1859, 1873
John Steer	Trinity Bay	Conservative	1873
James H. Watson	Trinity Bay	Conservative	1874
Frederick Carter	Twillingate and Fogo	Conservative	1859
Charles Duder	Twillingate and Fogo	Conservative	1873
William Kelligrew	Twillingate and Fogo	Conservative	1874

== By-elections ==
None
