= 1874 Newfoundland general election =

Election in the Colony of Newfoundland

- November 7, 1874

31 seats of the Newfoundland House of Assembly 16 seats needed for a majority

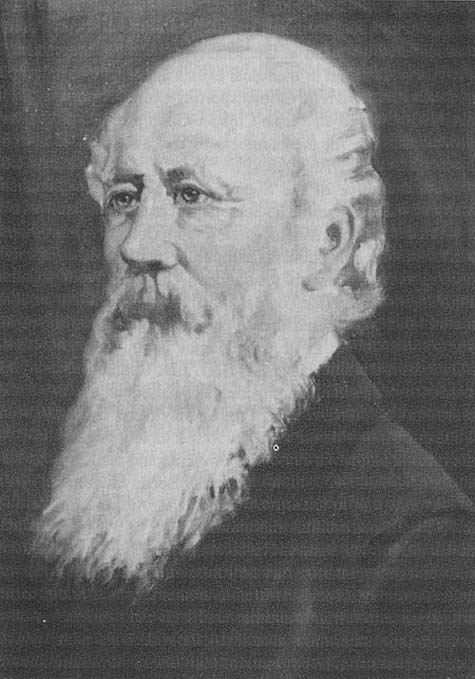
	First party	Second party
Leader	Frederick Carter	Charles Fox Bennett
Party	Conservative	Anti-Confederation
Leader since	1865	1869
Leader's seat	Twillingate and Fogo	Placentia and St. Mary's
Last election	14 (Note: This figure includes Carter's double election in the districts of Harbour Grace and Twillingate and Fogo.)	17
Seats won	18	13
Seat change	▲4	▼4
Popular vote	10,284	8,260
Percentage	55.14%	44.28%
Swing	▲15.64% (Note: Based on incomplete figures from the previous election)	▼16.22%
- Results by district
Premier before election
Frederick Carter
Conservative
Premier after election
Frederick Carter
Conservative

The 1874 Newfoundland general election was held on November 7, 1874 to elect members of the 12th General Assembly of Newfoundland in the Colony of Newfoundland. The Conservative Party led by Frederick Carter formed the government. The Anti-Confederate government of Charles Fox Bennett had collapsed amidst a bribery scandal.

== Results ==
Party	Leader	1873	Candidates	Seats won	Seat change	% of seats (% change)	Popular vote	% of vote (% change)
Conservative	Frederick Carter	14	19	18	▲4	58.06% (▲12.90%)	10,284	55.14% (▲15.64%)
Anti-Confederation	Charles Fox Bennett	17	24	13	▼4	41.94% (▼12.90%)	8,260	44.28% (▼16.22%)
Other		0	1	0	Steady	0.00%	108	0.57% (▲0.57%)
Totals		31	44	31	Steady	100%	18,652	100%

== Results by district ==
- Names in **boldface type** represent party leaders.
- † indicates that the incumbent did not run again.
- ‡ indicates that the incumbent ran in a different district.

=== St. John's ===
Electoral district	Candidates		Incumbent
Electoral district	Conservative (historical)	Anti-Confederation	Incumbent
St. John's East	James Wheeler; 519; 14.79%	Robert Kent; 1,006; 28.66%	John Dearin
St. John's East	James Wheeler; 519; 14.79%	Robert Parsons; 1,000; 28.49%	Robert Parsons
St. John's East	James Wheeler; 519; 14.79%	John Dearin; 985; 28.06%	Robert Kent
St. John's West		Lewis Tessier; Won by acclamation	Lewis Tessier
St. John's West		Patrick Scott; Won by acclamation	Patrick Scott
St. John's West		Maurice Fenelon; Won by acclamation	Maurice Fenelon

=== Conception Bay ===
Electoral district	Candidates			Incumbent
Electoral district	Conservative (historical)	Anti-Confederation	Independent	Incumbent
Bay de Verde	James Rogerson; Won by acclamation			James Rogerson
Carbonear	John Rorke; 348; 79.63%	Francis Taylor; 89; 20.37%		John Rorke
Harbour Grace	Ambrose Shea; 1,008; 47.91%		William Wood (Independent); 108; 5.13%	Ambrose Shea
Harbour Grace	Joseph Godden; 988; 46.96%		William Wood (Independent); 108; 5.13%	William Wood
Harbour Main		Joseph Little; Won by acclamation		Joseph Little
Harbour Main		Patrick Nowlan; Won by acclamation		Patrick Nowlan
Port de Grave	Nathaniel Rabbitts; 448; 57.00%	John Bartlett; 338; 43.00%		John Bartlett

=== Avalon Peninsula ===
Electoral district	Candidates	Incumbent
Electoral district	Anti-Confederation	Incumbent
Ferryland	Richard Raftus; Won by acclamation	Thomas Glen†
Ferryland	James Conroy; Won by acclamation	Richard Raftus
Placentia and St. Mary's	**Charles Fox Bennett**; Won by acclamation	**Charles Fox Bennett**
Placentia and St. Mary's	James Collins; Won by acclamation	James Collins
Placentia and St. Mary's	Michael Dwyer; Won by acclamation	Vacant (Note: Henry Renouf had been elected in 1873, but his office was vacated when Premier Bennett appointed him as a district court judge.)

=== Eastern and Central Newfoundland ===
Electoral district	Candidates		Incumbent
Electoral district	Conservative (historical)	Anti-Confederation	Incumbent
Bonavista Bay	John Warren; 852; 20.76%	Francis Winton; 539; 13.13%	Charles Bowring
Bonavista Bay	Charles Bowring; 843; 20.54%	? Knowling; 524; 12.76%	A. J. W. McNeilly
Bonavista Bay	A. J. W. McNeilly; 833; 20.29%	William Barnes; 514; 12.52%	John Burton†
Trinity Bay	William Whiteway; Won by acclamation		John Steer
Trinity Bay	John Steer; Won by acclamation		John Warren‡ (ran in Bonavista Bay)
Trinity Bay	James Watson; Won by acclamation		William Whiteway
Twillingate and Fogo	**Frederick Carter**; 1,008; 19.09%	Smith McKay; 795; 15.06%	**Frederick Carter**
Twillingate and Fogo	Charles Duder; 997; 18.89%	? Rolls; 780; 14.78%	Charles Duder
Twillingate and Fogo	William Kelligrew; 961; 18.20%	? Lemessurier; 738; 13.98%	Smith McKay

=== Southern Newfoundland ===
Electoral district	Candidates		Incumbent
Electoral district	Conservative (historical)	Anti-Confederation	Incumbent
Burgeo and LaPoile	Prescott Emerson; Won by acclamation		Prescott Emerson
Burin	Charles Ayre; 552; 31.47%	? Bennett; 328; 18.70%	James Winter
Burin	James Winter; 550; 31.36%	? Scott; 324; 18.47%	Charles Ayre
Fortune Bay	Robert Alexander; 377; 55.69%	Robert Pinsent; 300; 44.31%	Vacant (Note: Thomas Bennett had been elected in 1873, but his office was vacated when Premier Charles Fox Bennett appointed him as a district court judge in Harbour Grace.)
