= Time in Canada =

Time zones in Canada

| Standard | DST | Time zone name (Note: The time zone column does not have legal meaning and may deviate from the government-designated name of the time zone.) |
|---|---|---|
| UTC−07:00 (year-round) | | Mountain (Note: Year-round UTC−7 is referred to as Pacific Time (PCT) by the British Columbia government (not to be confused with Pacific Standard Time in the United States) and as Yukon Standard Time by the Yukon government.) |
| UTC−07:00 | UTC−06:00 | Mountain |
| UTC−06:00 (year-round) | | Central (Note: Year-round UTC−6 is referred to as Alberta Time by the Alberta government and as Northwest Territories Time by the Northwest Territories government.) |
| UTC−06:00 | UTC−05:00 | Central |
| UTC−05:00 (year-round) | | Eastern (Note: Year-round UTC−5 is referred to as Manitoba Standard Time (MBT) by the Manitoba government.) |
| UTC−05:00 | UTC−04:00 | Eastern |
| UTC−04:00 (year-round) | | Atlantic |
| UTC−04:00 | UTC−03:00 | Atlantic |
| UTC−03:30 | UTC−02:30 | Newfoundland |

Canada is divided into five time zones, ranging from UTC−2:30 to UTC−7. The statutory names used for these zones vary between the country's provinces, but the traditional names are Mountain, Central, Eastern, Atlantic and Newfoundland time. (Note: At any given time in Canada, either five or six UTC offsets are active in Canada: UTC−7, UTC−6, UTC−5, UTC−4, UTC−3:30 (standard time only), UTC−3 (DST only), and UTC−2:30 (DST only).) The boundaries of time zones and the use of daylight saving time have shifted numerous times throughout Canada, and have extended from UTC−1:30 to UTC−9.

Most of Eastern Canada and Nunavut operate on standard time from the first Sunday in November to the second Sunday in March and daylight saving time the rest of the year; the rest of the country keeps the same time year-round. The divisions between time zones were originally based on proposals by Scottish Canadian railway engineer Sandford Fleming, who pioneered the use of the 24-hour clock, the world's time zone system, and a standard prime meridian.

As of 2026, some Canadian provinces have started or are transitioning to observing a form of permanent daylight saving time. As a result, the Pacific Time Zone was phased out completely in November 2026 and is no longer used anywhere in Canada.

== Official time ==
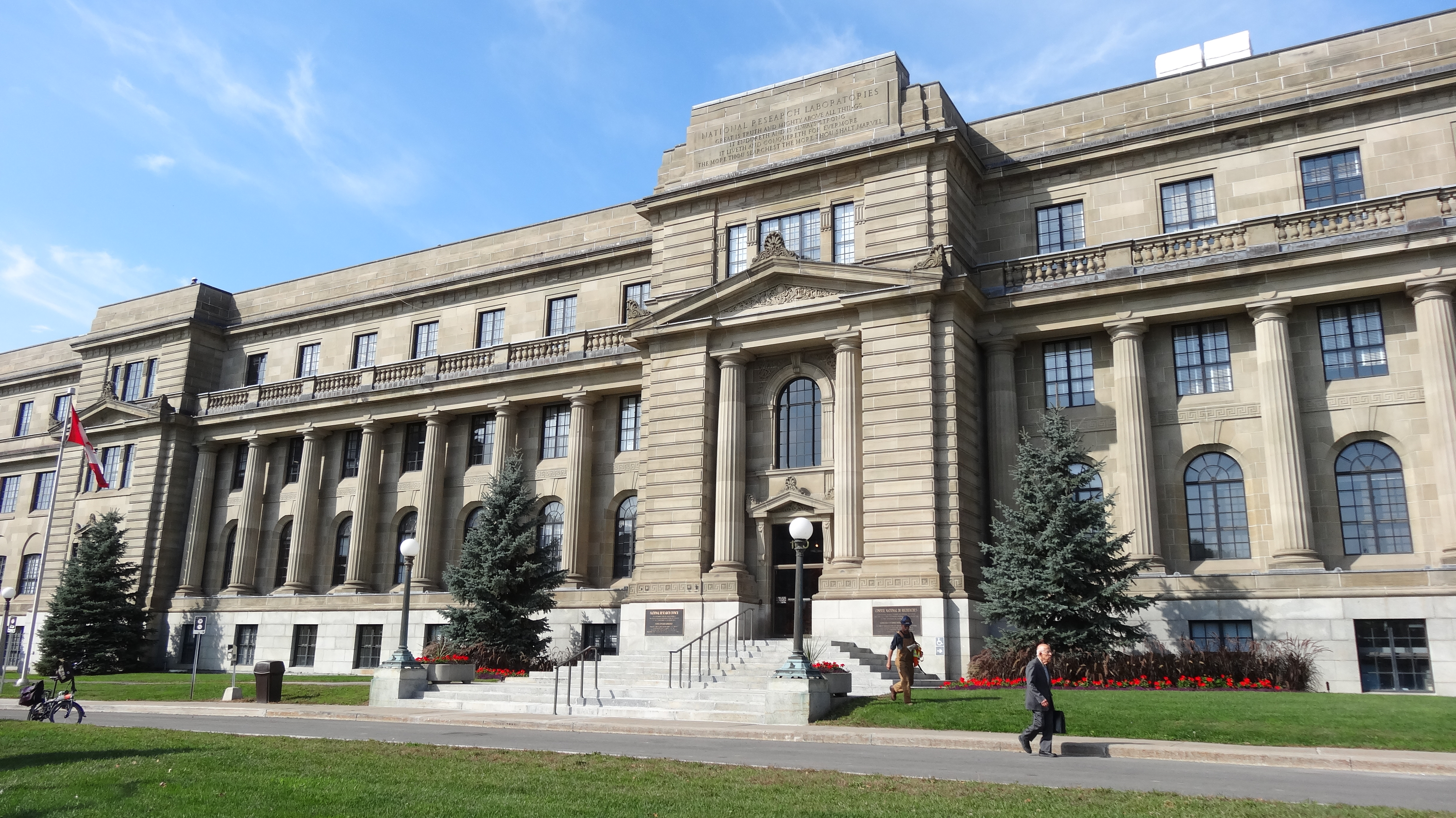
National Research Council laboratories in Ottawa

The National Research Council (NRC) maintains Canada's official time through the use of atomic clocks. The official time is specified in legislation passed by the individual provinces. In Alberta, British Columbia, Manitoba, the Northwest Territories, Saskatchewan, Quebec, and Yukon, it is based on Coordinated Universal Time. The other provinces use mean solar time. The NRC provides both Coordinated Universal Time and mean solar time in its signals. It makes time servers available for direct synchronization with computers. The Canadian Broadcasting Corporation aired a daily time signal, the National Research Council Time Signal, beginning 5 November 1939. The signal was discontinued on 15 October 2023.

== Time notation ==
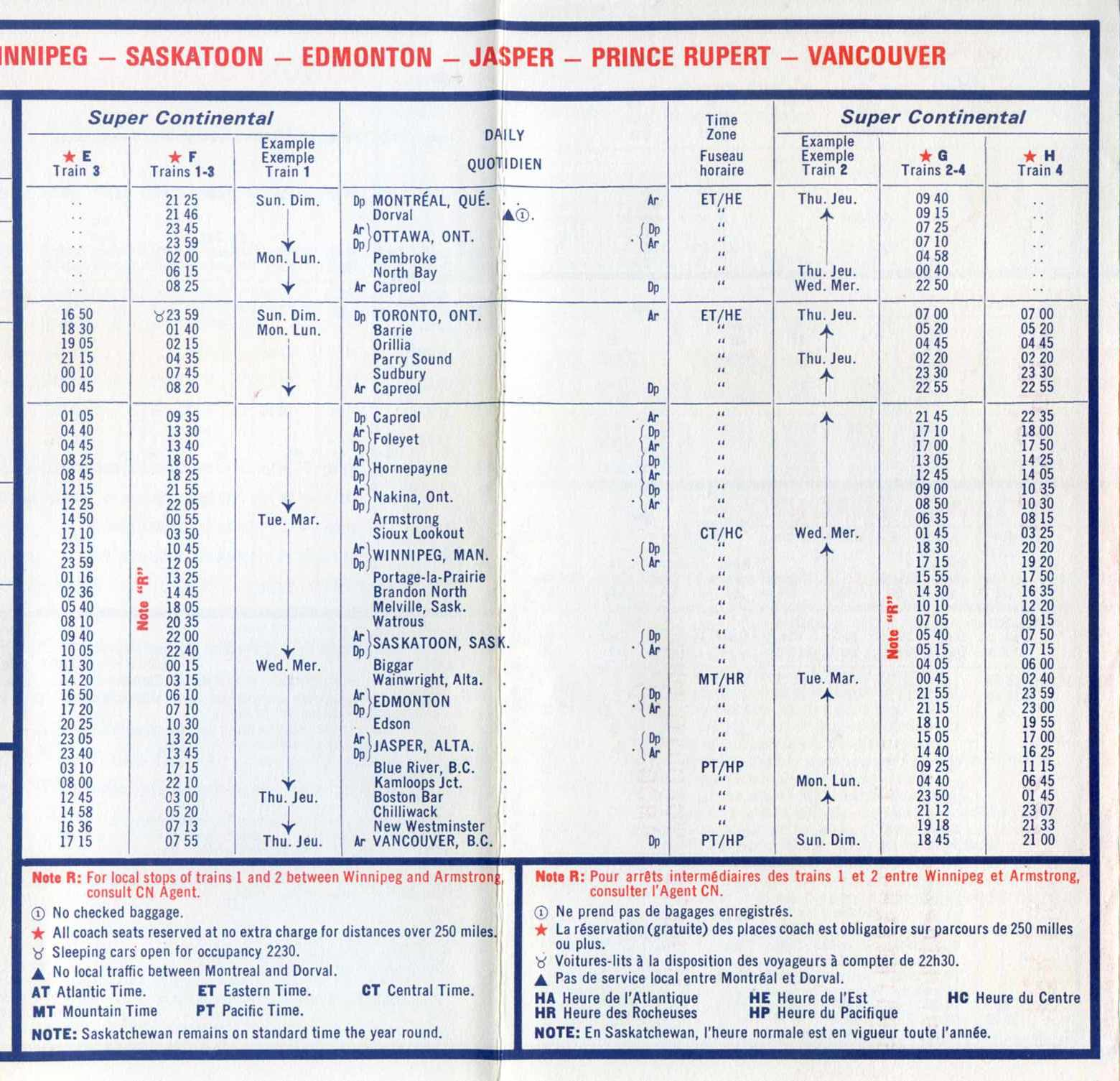
Canadian National timetable from 1975 using the 24-hour clock

The Government of Canada recommends use of the 24-hour clock (e.g. 19:56), which is widely used in contexts such as transportation schedules, parking meters, and data transmission. Speakers of Canadian French predominantly use this system, but most Canadian English speakers use the 12-hour clock in everyday speech (e.g. 7:56 pm), even when reading from a 24-hour display, similar to the use of the 24-hour clock in the United Kingdom.

== Zones ==
=== Mountain Time Zone ===
Mountain Standard Time (MST) UTC−07:00 year-round

- British Columbia, where it is called Pacific Time (PCT)
  - All of province except three southeastern municipalities observing Central Time
- Northwest Territories
  - Cantung Mine (unofficial) (Note: Tungsten (Cantung) Airport is shown as observing PST/PDT. Starting 2026, PST/PDT was no longer used in Canada. It is unknown if this region switched to permanent MST like other areas using PST/PDT or to permanent CST alongside the rest of the Northwest Territories. Unofficial websites show it as matching Vancouver time.)
- Yukon, where it is called Yukon Standard Time

Mountain Standard Time (MST) UTC−07:00 and Mountain Daylight Time (MDT) UTC−06:00

- Nunavut
  - Kitikmeot Region
  - Kivalliq Region west of 102°W
  - Qikiqtaaluk Region west of 102°W

=== Central Time Zone ===
Central Standard Time (CST) UTC−06:00 year-round

- British Columbia
  - Regional District of East Kootenay
  - Golden
  - Columbia-Shuswap Regional District Electoral Area A
- Northwest Territories, where it is called Northwest Territories Time
- Alberta, where it is called Alberta Time (ABT)
- Saskatchewan

Central Standard Time (CST) UTC−06:00 and Central Daylight Time (CDT) UTC−05:00

- Nunavut
  - Qikiqtaaluk Region between 85°W and 102°W
  - Kivalliq Region east of 102°W except areas using EST year-round

=== Eastern Time Zone ===
Eastern Standard Time (EST) UTC−05:00 year-round

- Saskatchewan
  - Creighton (unofficial)
- Manitoba, where it is called Manitoba Standard Time (MBT)
- Nunavut
  - Southampton Island, including Coral Harbour
  - Eureka station (unofficial)
- Ontario (northwestern)
  - West of 90°W (except Shebandowan–Upsala area)
  - Kitchenuhmaykoosib Inninuwug First Nation (Big Trout Lake) area

Eastern Standard Time (EST) UTC−05:00 and Eastern Daylight Time (EDT) UTC−04:00

- Nunavut
  - East of 85°W
- Ontario
  - East of 90°W (except Big Trout Lake area)
  - Shebandowan–Upsala area (unofficial)
- Quebec
  - All of province except areas using AST or AST/ADT

=== Atlantic Time Zone ===
Atlantic Standard Time (AST) UTC−04:00 year-round

- Quebec
  - Areas east of the Natashquan River

Atlantic Standard Time (AST) UTC−04:00 and Atlantic Daylight Time (ADT) UTC−03:00

- Newfoundland and Labrador
  - All of Labrador except the southeastern tip
- New Brunswick
- Nova Scotia
- Prince Edward Island
- Quebec
  - Listuguj Mi'gmaq First Nation
  - Magdalen Islands

=== Newfoundland Time Zone ===
Newfoundland Standard Time (NST) UTC−03:30 and Newfoundland Daylight Time (NDT) UTC−02:30

- Newfoundland and Labrador
  - Island of Newfoundland
  - Southeastern tip of Labrador

== History ==
Port Arthur, Ontario, was the first place in the world to introduce daylight saving time, on 1 July 1908. Four Canadian cities, by local ordinance, observed DST in 1916. Brandon, Manitoba, adopted it on 17 April. It was followed by Winnipeg on 23 April, Halifax on 30 April, and Hamilton, Ontario, on 4 June.

Five Canadian cities, by local ordinance, subsequently used daylight saving time before 1918: Regina, Saskatchewan, on April 23, 1914; Brandon and Winnipeg, Manitoba, on April 24, 1916; Halifax, Nova Scotia, on May 1, 1916; and Hamilton, Ontario, on June 4, 1916. St. John's, Newfoundland (now Newfoundland and Labrador) also used DST before 1918, but Newfoundland itself did not become a province of Canada until 1949.

In practice, DST across Canada has – since the late 1960s – been closely or completely synchronized with its observance in the United States to promote consistent economic and social interaction. When the United States extended DST in 1987 to the first Sunday in April, all DST-observing Canadian provinces followed suit to mimic the change. The latest United States change to daylight saving time – the Energy Policy Act of 2005, which began observance in 2007, adding parts of March and November to the period in which daylight saving time is observed – was also adopted by the various provinces and territories of Canada. The new transition dates were adopted by each of Canada's provinces and territories (except Saskatchewan) between 2005 and 2007, resulting in Canada and the US remaining synchronized.

=== Transition to permanent daylight saving time ===
In 2019, the legislature of British Columbia (BC) began the process of eliminating the practice of observing daylight saving time in the province. On 31 October 2019, the government introduced Bill 40 in the legislature, which would define Pacific Time as "7 hours behind Coordinated Universal Time (UTC)". In a press release, the provincial government stated its intention to maintain alignment of clock time with Washington, Oregon, California, and Yukon. The move followed a consultation earlier in 2019, in which the province received over 223,000 responses, 93% of which said they would prefer year-round DST as compared to the status quo of changing the clocks twice a year. The premier of British Columbia discussed the issue with Yukon premier Sandy Silver, who said in October that he needed more consultation with Yukon stakeholders, and with Alberta and Alaska.

In 2020, Yukon abandoned seasonal time change and moved to permanently observing Pacific Daylight Time year-round. In 2021, Alberta conducted a referendum on whether the province should adopt permanent daylight time, in which 50.24% of respondents voted to continue switching between standard and daylight time. On 2 March 2026, BC premier David Eby announced that, following the 2019 consultation, British Columbia would permanently adopt daylight time on 8 March 2026, effectively moving the province onto year-round Mountain Standard Time; the remaining parts of the province that used Mountain Time with DST and were in sync with Alberta's time zone were unaffected by this move. Following BC's decision, Alberta and the Northwest Territories moved to adopt permanent year-round Central Standard Time in April 2026, despite the results of the 2021 Alberta referendum. This put the province and territory in sync with Saskatchewan year-round. In September 2026, Golden, British Columbia, and Columbia-Shuswap Regional District (CSRD) Area A, two municipalities in BC previously aligned with Alberta in observing Mountain Time with DST followed BC's decision to permanently adopt Mountain Standard Time, putting them in sync with the rest of BC as opposed to Alberta, while earlier in August, the Regional District of East Kootenay followed the decisions of Alberta and the Northwest Territories to adopt permanent year-round Central Standard Time, retaining the previous synchronization with Alberta. Later, on 22 September, Golden and CSRD Area A reversed their decision and chose to stay aligned with Alberta, thereby adopting year-round Central Standard Time (UTC−06:00).

On 17 September 2026, Manitoba premier Wab Kinew announced that Manitoba would be permanently adopting daylight time, effectively moving the province onto year-round Eastern Standard Time (UTC−05:00).

On 13 October 2026, Ontario member of Provincial Parliament Greg Rickford announced that parts of Northwestern Ontario would be permanently adopting daylight time to maintain their traditional alignment with Manitoba.

== Daylight saving time ==
Daylight saving time (DST) is observed in six of ten provinces (all in Eastern Canada) and one of three territories, with exceptions. The six jurisdictions that do not observe DST are all located geographically west of their legislated time zones by one hour or more, meaning that they effectively use daylight time year-round. Under the Constitution of Canada, laws related to timekeeping are a purely provincial matter, which has historically led to a fragmented adoption timeline across the country.

Saskatchewan was the first major jurisdiction to end seasonal clock shifts, adopting year-round Central Standard Time for much of the province in 1966. Decades later, Yukon followed suit by permanently adopting year-round Pacific Daylight Time in March 2020. A coordinated sweeping shift across provinces occurred in late 2026, when a wave of western and central jurisdictions, led by British Columbia, abandoned the semi-annual clock change to adopt permanent daylight time.

On November 1, 2026, British Columbia transitioned most of the province to a form of year-round permanent Pacific Daylight Time (UTC−07:00), Alberta and the Northwest Territories permanently adopted year-round Mountain Daylight Time (UTC−06:00), and Manitoba and Northwestern Ontario permanently adopted year-round Eastern Standard Time (UTC−05:00). As of late 2026, the majority of Ontario, Quebec, Nunavut, and Atlantic Canada continue to observe seasonal time adjustments.

== Former time zones ==
- The Yukon Time Zone (UTC−09:00) covered most of Yukon from 1900 until 1966. In 1973, the last portions of Yukon switched to Pacific Time, leaving UTC−09:00 unused in Canada.
- In 1988, Newfoundland observed "double daylight saving time" from 3 April until 30 October, meaning that the time was set ahead by 2 hours. All of Newfoundland and southern Labrador, which observes UTC−03:30 as its standard time zone, observed UTC−01:30. This happened only in 1988, and the province now adjusts its time by only one hour for daylight saving time.
- Pacific Standard Time (UTC−08:00) was used in Yukon and most of British Columbia until 2020 and 2026, respectively. Both jurisdictions switched to year-round Pacific Daylight Time (UTC−07:00, equivalent to Mountain Standard Time), leaving UTC−08:00 unused in Canada.

== IANA time zone database ==
Data for Canada from zone.tab of the IANA time zone database. Columns marked with * are the columns from zone.tab itself.

| C.c.* | Coordinates* | TZ* | Comments* | UTC offset | UTC offset DST | Description | Map |
|---|---|---|---|---|---|---|---|
| CA | +4734−05243 | America/St_Johns | Newfoundland, Labrador (SE) | −03:30 | −02:30 | Uses UTC−03:30 with daylight saving time Includes the entire Island of Newfoundland and the Labrador Straits region of Labrador | |
| CA | +5125−05707 | America/Blanc-Sablon | AST – QC (Lower North Shore) | −04:00 | | Has used UTC−04:00 year-round since the IANA cutoff date in 1970; alias for America/Puerto_Rico Includes all of Le Golfe-du-Saint-Laurent Regional County Municipality | |
| CA | +4612−05957 | America/Glace_Bay | Atlantic – NS (Cape Breton) | −04:00 | −03:00 | Now in sync with America/Halifax but did not adopt daylight saving time until 1972 Likely includes all of Cape Breton Island and possibly part of mainland Nova Scotia | |
| CA | +5320−06025 | America/Goose_Bay | Atlantic – Labrador (most areas) | −04:00 | −03:00 | Now in sync with America/Halifax but from 1987–2011, started and ended daylight saving time at 12:01 am rather than 2:00 am Includes all of Labrador except for the Labrador Straits region | |
| CA | +4439−06336 | America/Halifax | Atlantic – NS (most areas), PE | −04:00 | −03:00 | Uses UTC−04:00 with daylight saving time Includes a majority of Nova Scotia, all of Prince Edward Island, and Quebec's Magdalen Islands and Listuguj Miꞌgmaq First Nation | |
| CA | +4606−06447 | America/Moncton | Atlantic – New Brunswick | −04:00 | −03:00 | Now in sync with America/Halifax but prior to 2007, started and ended daylight saving time at 12:01 am rather than 2:00 am Includes all of New Brunswick | |
| CA | | America/Pangnirtung | | −05:00 | −04:00 | Redirects to America/Iqaluit | — |
| CA | +6344−06828 | America/Iqaluit | Eastern – NU (most areas) | −05:00 | −04:00 | Now in sync with America/Toronto but used −04:00 with daylight saving time until 1995 | |
| CA | | America/Montreal | | −05:00 | −04:00 | Redirects to America/Toronto as of version 2015c | — |
| CA | +4339−07923 | America/Toronto | Eastern – ON & QC (most areas) | −05:00 | −04:00 | Uses UTC−05:00 with daylight saving time Includes a majority of Ontario and Quebec. Legally, its western boundary is the 90th meridian west but in practice, it is not observed by Big Trout Lake. Adoption of daylight saving time in Ontario may have been patchy until 1974. | |
| CA | | America/Nipigon | | −05:00 | −04:00 | Redirects to America/Toronto as of version 2022f Created for places observing Eastern time that allegedly did not observe DST 1967–1973 but this was not well sourced | — |
| CA | | America/Thunder_Bay | | −05:00 | −04:00 | Redirects to America/Toronto Created because of a claim that Thunder Bay did not use DST in 1973 | — |
| CA | +484531−0913718 | America/Atikokan | EST – ON (Atikokan), NU (Coral H) | −05:00 | | Has used UTC−05:00 year-round since the IANA cutoff date in 1970; alias for America/Panama Includes four areas: Atikokan, Ontario; Mishkeegogamang First Nation in Ontario; Southampton Island, Nunavut; and Eureka station, Nunavut | |
| CA | +624900−0920459 | America/Rankin_Inlet | Central – NU (central) | −06:00 | −05:00 | Uses UTC−06:00 with daylight saving time | |
| CA | | America/Rainy_River | | −05:00 | | Redirects to America/Winnipeg as of version 2022f Created for places observing Central Time that allegedly did not observe daylight saving time from 1967–1973, but this is not well sourced | — |
| CA | +744144−0944945 | America/Resolute | Central – NU (Resolute) | −06:00 | −05:00 | Now in sync with America/Rankin_Inlet but skipped daylight saving time in 2007 Includes Southampton Island | |
| CA | +4953−09709 | America/Winnipeg | EST – Manitoba, ON (northwest) | −05:00 | | Used UTC−06:00 with daylight saving time until 2026 Includes Big Trout Lake and Denare Beach in practice, though by law they should be in America/Toronto and America/Regina, respectively | |
| CA | +690650−1050310 | America/Cambridge_Bay | Mountain – NU (west) | −07:00 | −06:00 | Now uses UTC−07:00 with daylight saving but used UTC−06:00 with daylight saving from 1999 to 2001 Includes the western third of Nunavut | |
| CA | +5024−10439 | America/Regina | CST – SK (most areas) | −06:00 | | Has used UTC−06:00 year-round since the IANA cutoff date in 1970 | |
| CA | +5017−10750 | America/Swift_Current | CST – SK (midwest) | −06:00 | | Used UTC−07:00 year-round until 1972 Includes southwest Saskatchewan. Map is approximate; the exact boundaries are based on old school districts. | |
| CA | +5333−11328 | America/Edmonton | CST – AB, BC(E), NT(E), SK(W) | −06:00 | | Used UTC−07:00 with daylight saving time until 2026 Includes all of Alberta, City of Lloydminster in Saskatchewan, Regional District of East Kootenay and Columbia-Shuswap Regional District Area A in British Columbia, and the eastern half of the Northwest Territories | |
| CA | | America/Yellowknife | | −06:00 | | Redirects to America/Edmonton | — |
| CA | +4906−11631 | America/Creston | MST – BC (Creston) | −07:00 | | Has used UTC−07:00 year-round since the IANA cutoff date in 1970; alias for America/Phoenix | |
| CA | +5546−12014 | America/Dawson_Creek | MST – BC (Dawson Cr, Ft St John) | −07:00 | | Used UTC−07:00 with daylight saving time until 1973 Includes the eastern half of Peace River Regional District | |
| CA | +5848−12242 | America/Fort_Nelson | MST – BC (Ft Nelson) | −07:00 | | Used UTC−07:00 with daylight saving time until 2015 Includes Northern Rockies Regional Municipality in British Columbia | |
| CA | +4916−12307 | America/Vancouver | MST – BC (most areas) | −07:00 | | Used UTC−08:00 with daylight saving time until 2026 Includes a majority of British Columbia | |
| CA | +682059−1334300 | America/Inuvik | CST – NT (west) | −06:00 | | Used UTC−08:00 with daylight saving time until 1979 and used UTC−07:00 with daylight saving time from 1979 to 2026 Defined as areas in NWT west of 120th meridian west | |
| CA | +6043−13503 | America/Whitehorse | MST – Yukon (east) | −07:00 | | Used UTC−08:00 with daylight saving time until 2020 Includes a majority of Yukon | |
| CA | +6404−13925 | America/Dawson | MST – Yukon (west) | −07:00 | | Used UTC−09:00 with daylight saving time until 1973 and used UTC−08:00 with daylight saving time from 1973–2020 Includes all of Yukon west of 138th meridian west | |

== See also ==
- Lists of time zones
- Newfoundland's Daylight Saving Act of 1917
- 1972 British Columbia time plebiscite
- Effects of time zones on North American broadcasting
- National Research Council Time Signal
- Date and time notation in Canada
