= James McLoughlan =

Newfoundland politician (1830–1913)

The Honourable Captain James McLoughlan MLC MHA

Member of the Legislative Council of Newfoundland
- In office February 19, 1884 – March 16, 1913
- Nominated by: William Whiteway
- Appointed by: John Hawley Glover

Member of the Newfoundland House of Assembly for St. John's West
- In office October 30, 1879 – November 6, 1882 Serving with Patrick J. Scott and Lewis Tessier
- Preceded by: Maurice Fenelon
- Succeeded by: James J. Callanan; Philip D. White

Personal details
- Born: c. 1830 Taghmon, Ireland
- Died: March 16, 1913 (aged 82–83) St. John's, Newfoundland
- Party: Liberal
- Spouse: Catherine Stafford
- Children: 3
- Occupation: Merchant

James McLoughlan (c. 1830 – March 16, 1913) was an Irish-born merchant and politician in Newfoundland. The head of a mercantile firm providing vessels and supplies for the seal fishery, McLoughlan served in the House of Assembly as a member for St. John's West supporting opposition leader Joseph Ignatius Little from 1879 to 1882. He was subsequently appointed by premier William Whiteway to the Legislative Council in 1884, and he served there for the remainder of his life. At the time of his death, McLoughlan was the most senior member of the upper house.

== Early life and career ==
McLoughlan was born in Taghmon, County Wexford, Ireland to a family with connections to the Grand Bank fisheries. He immigrated to St. John's, Newfoundland in 1848 to assist his uncle and namesake James McLoughlan with his mercantile firm providing vessels and supplies for the cod and seal fisheries. He commanded one of his uncle's schooners in 1853. Following his uncle's death, McLoughlan took over the family business in 1870.

== Politics ==
McLoughlan entered politics when he ran in an 1879 by-election for St. John's West triggered by the appointment of incumbent Maurice Fenelon as the inspector of the colony's Roman Catholic schools. Robert J. Pinsent, the co-leader of the opposition party who had recently been defeated in the 1878 general election, had originally expressed interest in running for the seat, but he instead accepted an appointment to the Supreme Court. Both McLoughlan and his opponent, Philip D. White, supported the opposition interest against premier William Whiteway. This resulted in an election fought on denominational rather than ideological lines with McLoughlan representing the Roman Catholic community and White receiving the support of the Protestant churches. In what was described by contemporary observers as a spirited but peaceful contest, McLoughlan narrowly defeated White by a margin of 55 votes. Much of McLoughlan's support came from the more heavily Catholic communities outside of St. John's including Petty Harbour and Topsail. Much of the opposition party later joined Whiteway in support of the development of the Newfoundland Railway. McLoughlan subsequently chose not to run for re-election in the 1882 general election.

Premier Whiteway nominated McLoughlan to the Legislative Council, the colony's upper house, in 1884. Serving in the legislature for nearly 30 years, McLaughlan became the Legislative Council's most senior member and its second oldest member behind James Baird. He died in St. John's on March 16, 1913.

== Electoral history ==
St. John's West by-election, October 30, 1879
Party	Candidate	Votes	%	±%
Liberal	James McLoughlan	675	52.12	N/A
Liberal	Philip D. White	620	47.88	N/A
Liberal hold		Swing		N/A
Source: Morning Chronicle, November 1, 1879
