= YDT =

YDT may refer to:

- Boundary Bay Airport near Vancouver, Canada
- A US Navy hull classification symbol: Diving tender (YDT)
- Yukon Daylight Time, no longer observed; see Yukon Time Zone
