= Ayre and Sons =

Defunct Newfoundland department store chain

Ayre & Sons, Ltd.
- Company type: Private (1859-1991)
- Industry: Retail (Department store & Supermarket)
- Founded: 1859
- Defunct: 1991
- Fate: Filed for bankruptcy
- Headquarters: St. John's, Newfoundland
- Key people: Charles R. Ayre
- Products: Everything from clothing to farming implements
- Number of employees: 70,000

Ayre & Sons, Ltd. was a department store chain in Newfoundland, Canada. The chain was formed in 1859 in St. John's, Newfoundland by Charles R. Ayre. Ayre opened his flagship store on Water Street in St. John's in 1859. After Newfoundland joined the Canadian confederation in 1949, Ayre's opened some more stores across the province in the 1960s, with locations in Mount Pearl, Carbonear, Corner Brook, and Wabush. A location in the Avalon Mall in St. John's also opened when the mall opened in 1967. However, the company began to encounter financial problems in the 1980s, and in 1991, Ayre and Sons filed for bankruptcy.

== Ayre's Supermarkets ==
Ayre's also began to open supermarkets in the 1960s, under the name Ayre's Supermarkets. The chain was sold to Dominion Stores Ltd. in 1963, with six locations in the St. John's area (five in St. John's plus one in Mount Pearl), as well as supermarkets in Carbonear and Corner Brook. As a result, Ayre's Supermarkets later adopted the Dominion brand. Following the sale of Dominion to A&P Canada, the Dominion stores in Newfoundland and Labrador were resold to local owners in 1987 and subsequently merged with two smaller local chains. The newly amalgamated parent company was named Amalco Foods, but the combined chain's brand name remained "Dominion". The amalgamated chain was acquired by Loblaw Companies Limited in 1995.

== Locations ==
- St. John's
  - Water Street - The original flagship store of Ayre and Sons, opened in 1859.
  - Avalon Mall - Ayre's Department Store. Opened 1967. Converted to expansion of mall interior following a major renovation program in 1993, with Scotiabank and across from that Gap among its tenants. The space that occupied that then renovated in early 2018 once more to become Charm Diamond Centres, Claire's (2019), The Source and Jump Plus with Scotiabank remaining.
  - Churchill Square - Ayre's Supermarket. Became a Dominion store until 2007, where Loblaw rebranded the store a SaveEasy.
  - Summerville - Ayre's Supermarket. Located in a mini-mall on Elizabeth Avenue at Paton Street. The Dominion store was closed in 1994, and the plaza was demolished in 1998 to make way for a condominium complex.
  - Parade Street - Ayre's Supermarket - became a Dominion store until December 21, 1992, when it was destroyed by a major fire, which also claimed several other buildings and businesses. The St. John's Central Fire Station now stands on the site.
  - Hamilton Avenue - Ayre's Supermarket - became a Dominion store until 1995 - now closed
  - Torbay Road Mall - Ayre's Supermarket - became a Dominion store until 1993, at which point it moved to a then-larger store on Newfoundland Drive (closed in 2007) - was IGA from 1996 to 1999 - now Shoppers Drug Mart
- Mount Pearl - Centennial Square (Commonwealth Avenue) - Ayre's Supermarket. The store later became a Dominion store until 1993. At that time, closed and was relocated to the Pearlgate Mall. The latter was branded as "Dominion Marketplace" until it was taken over by Loblaw. In 1997, Coleman's Supermarket (a local chain of supermarkets based in Corner Brook) opened in the former store; this is their first location in the St. John's area.
- Carbonear
- Corner Brook - Called Ayre's Supermarket, it operated in the Corner Brook Plaza. It became a Dominion store until 2002, when it moved to a larger store at the "big box" development at Murphy Square.
- Wabush
