= Dominion Stores (Newfoundland) =

Supermarket chain in Newfoundland, Canada

- Logo as of August 2024

- A Dominion store in St. John's
- Company type: Division
- Industry: Retail; Supermarket
- Predecessor: Ayre and Sons
- Founded: circa 1959; 67 years ago in St. John's, Newfoundland and Labrador (as Ayre's Supermarkets)
- Number of locations: 11 (2024)
- Area served: Newfoundland
- Products: Appliances; baked goods; preserved meats; clothing; dairy; delicatessen; frozen foods; gardening supplies; general grocery; meat; pharmaceuticals; seafood; snacks
- Brands: No Name; President's Choice
- Services: Online purchase collection; community room; dietitian; dry cleaning; fashion, liquor store; optometry; pharmacy; photo studio; tobacconist; walk-in clinic
- Parent: Loblaw Companies
- Website: newfoundlandgrocerystores.ca

Dominion Stores, commonly referred to as simply Dominion, is the primary brand name of the major-market supermarkets of Loblaw Companies Limited in the province of Newfoundland and Labrador, currently all located on the island of Newfoundland.

The Newfoundland operations were part of the national Dominion supermarket chain from 1963 to 1987 when that company was split up, with Loblaw acquiring the stores in 1995 but retaining a provincial licence to the Dominion brand. The current owner of the trademark, Metro Inc., which operated the Dominion banner in Ontario until 2008, has no other affiliation with the Newfoundland locations.

Under Loblaw ownership, the chain has shared branding and marketing with other Loblaw operations—particularly, since August 2024, Real Atlantic Superstore and Real Canadian Superstore—while maintaining the historic "Dominion" name.

== History ==
The chain began as Ayre's Supermarkets, a division of local department store chain Ayre and Sons, which operated five locations in St. John's by 1959. It was acquired by Argus Corporation via Dominion Stores Ltd. in 1963, eventually adopting the Dominion brand.

In 1976, Dominion Stores announced a joint venture with Newfoundland conglomerate Baine, Johnston & Co., to operate the latter's wholesale division, which was renamed Donovans Wholesale Ltd. Eight years later, in 1984, the companies agreed to combine their retail and wholesale food operations under local management, adding the 13 Dominion stores in the province to the venture.

The following year, Argus Corporation under new owner Conrad Black began to break up the national chain, including the sale of most Ontario stores and the rights to the name to A&P Canada; at that point, Dominion Stores Ltd. owned 60% of the Newfoundland operations. By 1987, the latter had been fully sold to Baine Johnston. Soon after, these stores were merged with two smaller local chains; the newly-amalgamated operating company was named Amalco Foods, but the combined chain's brand name remained "Dominion".

Later in 1987, Baine Johnston announced a new partnership with Loblaw Companies unit Atlantic Wholesalers involving what were by then 17 Dominion stores in the province. Atlantic Wholesalers also announced plans to separately open a location of its superstore format in St. John's, the fate of which is unclear.

Alternate logo used in national media due to the trademark of the name "Dominion"

Logo used from c. 1997 to 2024

Loblaw acquired the Dominion chain in Newfoundland outright in 1995, and soon after began implementing its own private-label products and store designs at these locations. Ultimately Dominion's traditional "Big D" logo was replaced with a derivative of the Loblaws logo, rotated to look like a D instead of an L.

Circa 2017, renovated Dominion stores changed the orientation of the logo to match the Loblaws logo. This version was only intermittently used in advertising, with flyers soon reverting to the "D" version. Loblaws stated that it would continue to use the Dominion brand in the region.

In 2018, ten Dominion stores across the province were selected by the Newfoundland and Labrador Liquor Corporation to operate licensed cannabis retail outlets.

In August 2024, alongside the rebranding of Loblaw's major market supermarkets in the Maritime provinces from Atlantic Superstore to Real Atlantic Superstore, Dominion stores similarly adopted revised branding and new pricing practices based on those of Real Canadian Superstore (including the maple leaf "L" logo used by Superstore and No Frills) though again remaining under the "Dominion" banner. In certain national advertising and e-commerce contexts, the chain has been referenced only with the maple leaf logo and the text "Stores in Newfoundland and Labrador", as Loblaw does not have rights to use the "Dominion" name across Canada.

== Operations ==
In all respects other than name, the majority of Dominion stores in Newfoundland operate with the same appearance and format as the company's flagship Loblaws and Atlantic Superstore supermarkets, with some St. John's area locations being similar in format to the Loblaw-owned Real Canadian Superstore. Since 2002, these locations have in fact been operated as part of the Atlantic Superstore unit, with nearly identical advertising campaigns to Atlantic Superstore, and at various points sharing close similarities with both Real Canadian Superstore and Loblaws.

The chain has relocated or consolidated a number of locations into the "market" or superstore formats. Whereas there were roughly six locations in the early 2000s in St. John's proper (and many more in years past), there are now only two Dominion stores in the city, neither built before 2000. This transition culminated with the opening of a Dominion on the site of the former Memorial Stadium in St. John's in 2007. Coincident with that opening, two medium-size locations in the east end of St. John's (older General Supermarket locations acquired in the early 1990s) were closed, while a third (Churchill Square) was converted to a SaveEasy. As a result, it is believed that all Dominion stores in the province have now been transitioned to the newer formats. Since then, SaveEasy in Churchill Square has closed. Most of the previous Newfoundland Drive location is now occupied by a Colemans store, with a Bank of Montreal branch occupying the remaining space. The Memorial Stadium location closed on May 8, 2026.

== See also ==
- List of supermarkets
- Loblaws
- Real Atlantic Superstore
- Real Canadian Superstore
