= James C. Tessier =

Newfoundland politician (1842–1900)

James C. Tessier MHA
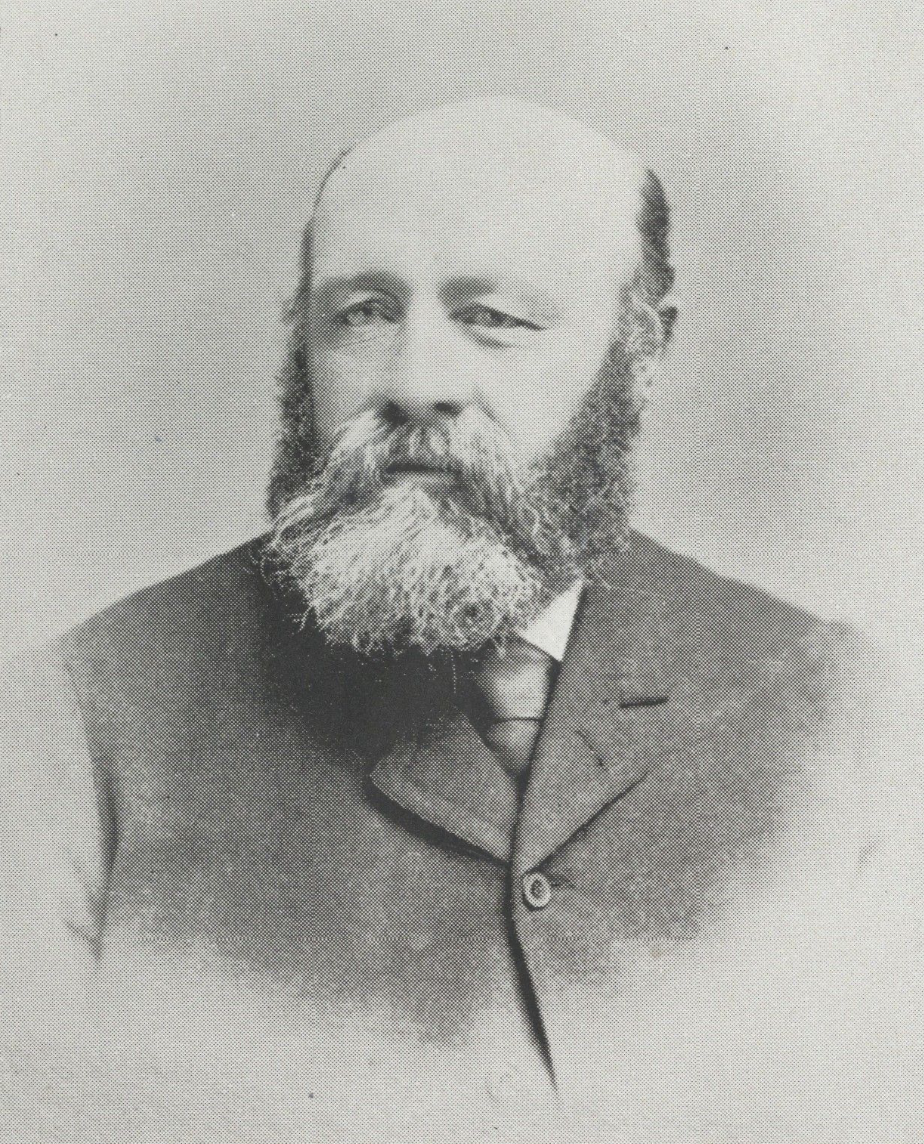
- Tessier in 1894

Member of the Newfoundland House of Assembly for St. John's West
- In office October 28, 1897 – November 8, 1900 Serving with James J. Callanan and Edward Morris
- Preceded by: Thomas P. Jackman; Patrick J. Scott
- Succeeded by: John Anderson; John Scott
- In office November 6, 1893 – November 10, 1894 Serving with Martin W. Furlong and Edward Morris
- Preceded by: James Day; Lawrence Gearin
- Succeeded by: Thomas P. Jackman; Patrick J. Scott; George Tessier

Personal details
- Born: January 18, 1842 London, England, U.K.
- Died: December 29, 1900 (aged 58) St. John's, Newfoundland Colony
- Party: Liberal
- Spouse(s): Ann Jackman Langmead (m. 1865) Julia Ann Trotman (m. 1883)
- Children: George Tessier
- Relatives: Peter G. Tessier (father); Lewis Tessier (uncle); Robert Carter (grandfather)
- Occupation: Merchant

James Carter Tessier (January 18, 1842 – December 29, 1900) was an English-born merchant and politician in Newfoundland. He represented St. John's West in the Newfoundland House of Assembly from 1893 to 1894 and from 1897 to 1900 as a Liberal.

== Career ==
The son of Peter G. Tessier and Jane Carter, who was the daughter of Robert Carter, he was born in London and came to Newfoundland in 1853. He worked in the family fishery supply business before establishing a fish exporting business in partnership with Robert Thorburn. The business was forced to close following the 1894 Bank Crash. He was married twice: first to Ann Jackman Langmead and then to Julia Ann Trotman. Tessier was unseated in 1894 after his election was appealed but was reelected in 1897.
