= James J. Callanan =

Newfoundland politician (1842–1900)

James J. Callanan MHA
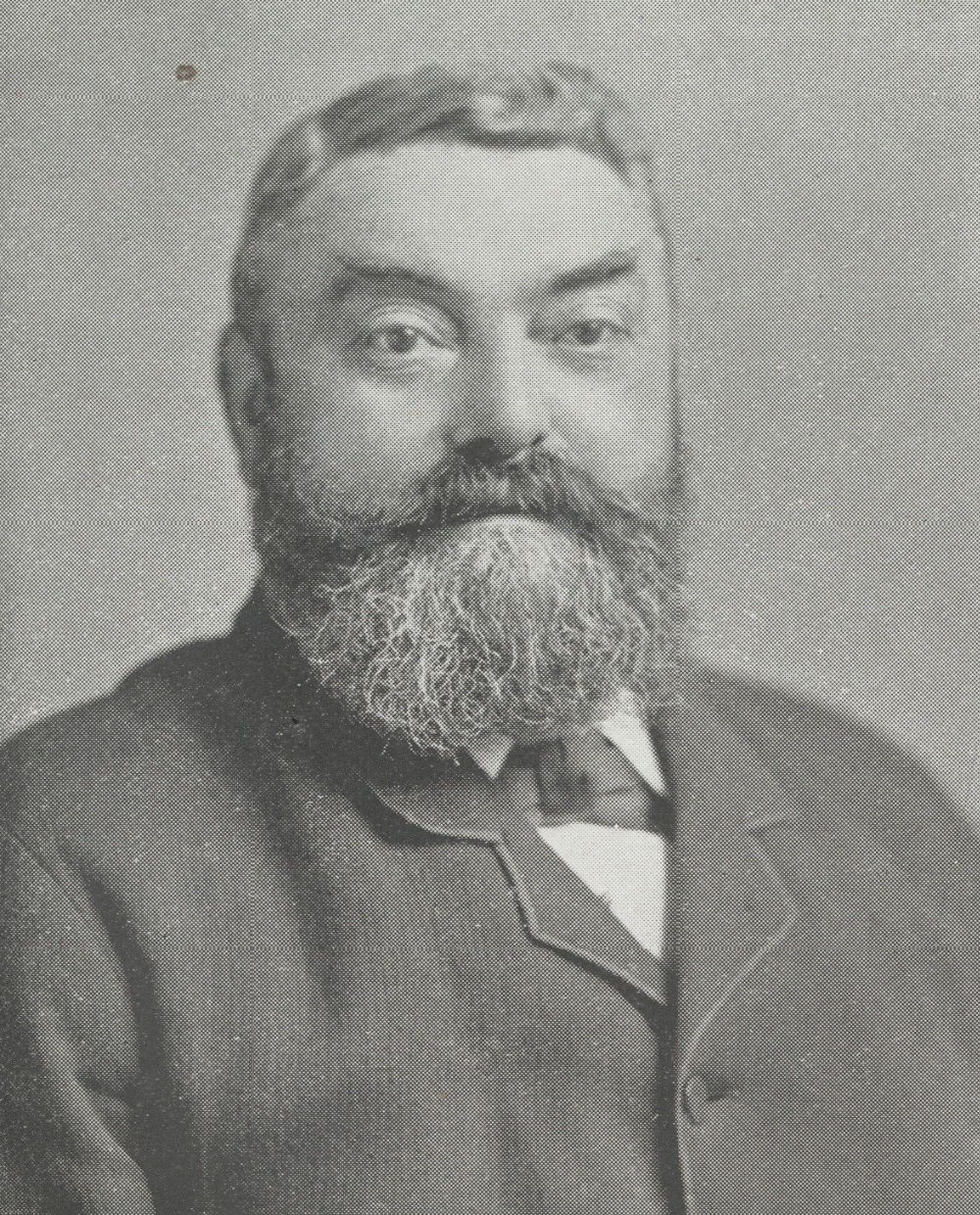
- Callanan in 1894

Member of the Newfoundland House of Assembly for St. John's West
- In office October 28, 1897 – June 8, 1900 Serving with Edward Morris and James C. Tessier
- Preceded by: Thomas P. Jackman; Patrick J. Scott
- Succeeded by: John Anderson; John Scott
- In office November 6, 1882 – November 6, 1889 Serving with Patrick J. Scott (1882–1889); Philip D. White (1882–1885); Edward Morris (1885–1889)
- Preceded by: James McLoughlan; Lewis Tessier
- Succeeded by: James Day; Lawrence Gearin

St. John's City Councillor At-large
- In office 1894 – January 23, 1896
- Appointed by: Augustus F. Goodridge

Personal details
- Born: 1842 St. John's, Newfoundland Colony
- Died: June 8, 1900 (aged 57–58) St. John's, Newfoundland Colony
- Party: Conservative (1882–1885, 1892–1897); Liberal (1885–1892, 1897–1900)
- Occupation: Fisherman, cooper, grocer

James J. Callanan (1842 – June 8, 1900) was a cooper, merchant and political figure in Newfoundland. He represented St. John's West in the Newfoundland and Labrador House of Assembly from 1882 to 1889 and from 1897 to 1900 as a Liberal.

== Business career ==
Callanan was born in St. John's and was tutored at home by private teachers. While working as a fisherman, he completed a coopering apprenticeship, establishing a cooperage in 1869 and joining the Mechanics Society the following year. In 1876, he became the president of the local Mechanics Institute in St. John's, and he remained in that role until 1890. In 1877, Callanan left his cooperage behind and established a retail and wholesale grocery business.

== Politics ==
Callanan entered the Newfoundland House of Assembly when he successfully ran as a Conservative candidate supporting Premier William Whiteway for the district of St. John's West in 1882. After he was re-elected in 1885 as a Liberal opposing Robert Thorburn's administration, Callanan lost his bid for a third term in 1889. He unsuccessfully attempted to regain his seat in 1893 as a Conservative candidate opposing Whiteway.

Callanan was then appointed to the St. John's City Council by the Augustus F. Goodridge administration in 1894, and he served until the subsequent 1896 municipal election. He then returned to the House of Assembly in 1897 as a supporter of Whiteway and he remained in office until his death in St. John's on June 8, 1900.
