= John Anderson (Newfoundland politician) =

Newfoundland politician (1855–1930)

The Honourable John Anderson MHA MLC
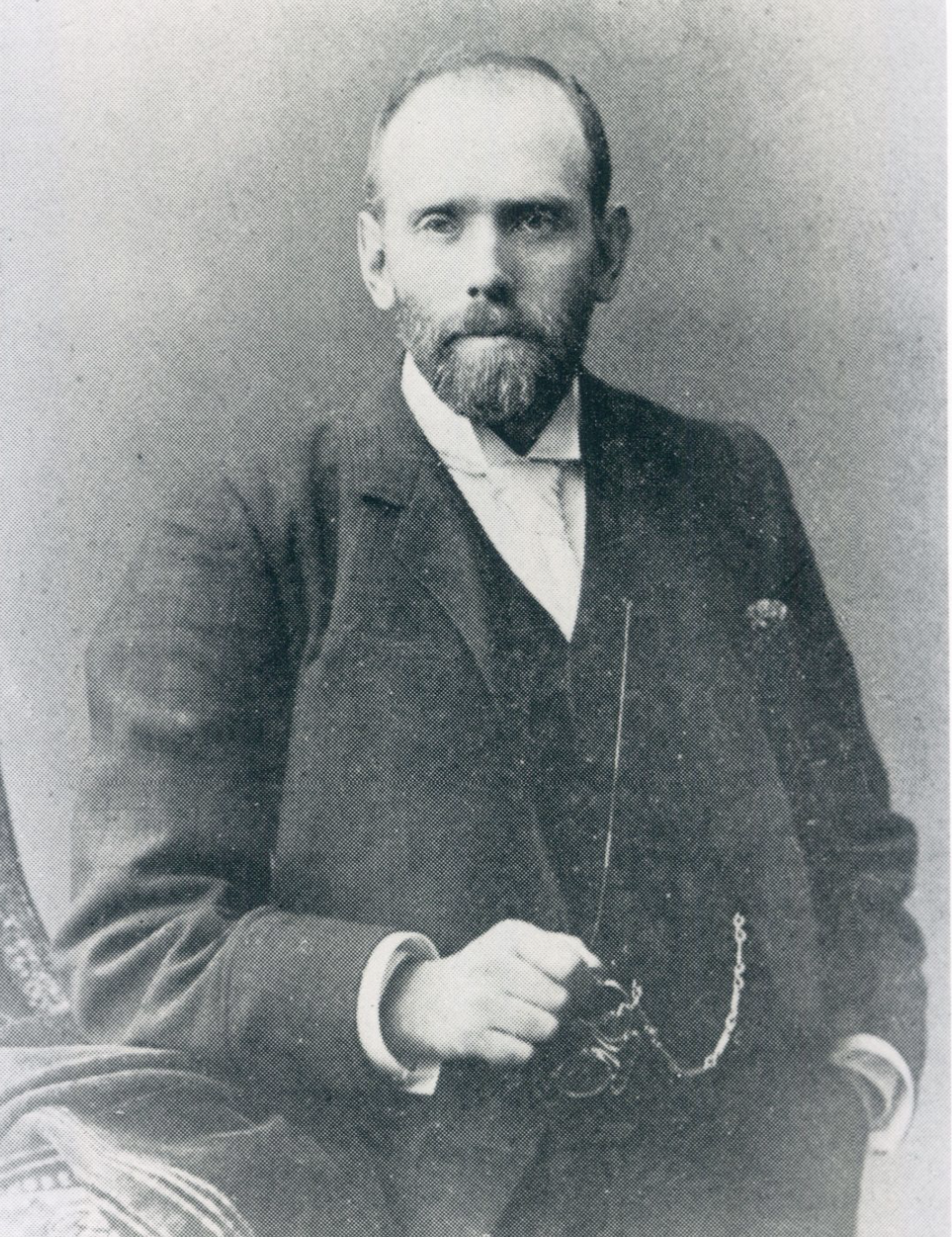
- Anderson in 1894

Member of the Legislative Council of Newfoundland
- In office 1905 – November 8, 1930
- Appointed by: Robert Bond
- Succeeded by: Harold Macpherson

Member of the Newfoundland House of Assembly for St. John's West
- In office November 8, 1900 – October 31, 1904 Serving with Edward Morris and John Scott
- Preceded by: James C. Tessier; James J. Callanan
- Succeeded by: John R. Bennett

Personal details
- Born: January 27, 1855 Saltcoats, Scotland
- Died: November 8, 1930 (aged 75) St. John's, Newfoundland
- Party: Liberal
- Spouses: Amelia Murray (m. 1884) Clymena "Minnie" Kaye (m. 1917)
- Children: 2 (John and Hugh)
- Occupation: Merchant

John Anderson (January 27, 1855 – November 8, 1930) was a Scottish-born Newfoundland businessman and politician. Anderson emigrated to Newfoundland as a young man and became the prosperous owner of a dry goods firm. As a Liberal supporter of Premier Robert Bond, he served as a member of the Newfoundland House of Assembly for St. John's West from 1900 to 1904 before Bond appointed him to the Legislative Council of Newfoundland. He was also a member of the St. John's City Council from 1902 to 1906 and a member of the municipal commission that governed the city from 1914 to 1916. As a municipal councillor, Anderson advocated for financial austerity measures and the construction of low-income housing.

Anderson is most well-known for his instrumental role in the introduction of daylight saving time in Newfoundland, which was the first North American country to adopt the measure. He had successfully persuaded the Legislative Council to pass a daylight saving bill in 1910, but it was rejected by the House of Assembly. However, the idea gained renewed interest in political circles during the First World War, and the House of Assembly passed the Daylight Saving Act of 1917.

== Early life, business career, and politics ==
Anderson was born in Saltcoats, Scotland as the son of John Anderson and Agnes (née King). He was educated at the local Saltcoats Academy. In 1875, he emigrated to St. John's, Newfoundland to work for the firm of James Baird as a draper's assistant. Anderson left Baird's business in 1884, and alongside Andrew Lumsden, he established the dry goods import firm Anderson & Lumsden. Lumsden left the business partnership in 1887 and Anderson became the sole owner of the mercantile enterprise. Now known as John Anderson Ltd., the business advertised itself as "The Great Provider" and expanded its wares to include a variety of clothing items.

A prominent "radical liberal," Anderson first entered politics in 1900 when he was elected to the House of Assembly as a Liberal candidate in St. John's West. He was subsequently elected to the St. John's city council in 1902 on a platform emphasizing financial management. Anderson thereafter focused on municipal politics and did not seek re-election to the House of Assembly in 1904, but Premier Bond appointed him to the Legislative Council, the colony's upper house, in 1905. He ran for mayor of St. John's in 1906, but his financial conservatism prevented him from getting support from labour unions like the Longshoremen's Protective Union, and he lost to Michael Gibbs.

== Daylight savings time advocacy ==
Anderson became interested in daylight saving time (DST) as a cost-saving measure in 1907 after reading a pamphlet by architect William Willett about his concept of British Summer Time. (Note: Some sources, like the Encyclopedia of Newfoundland and Labrador, state that Anderson had first encountered the idea after meeting Willett while on a business trip in London.) He believed that DST would allow Newfoundlanders to cut back on their usage of coal to heat their homes. Willett had originally suggested a gradual time shift of 20 minutes per week in the month of April, but Anderson convinced Willett that it would be easier to implement a single adjustment of one hour. Anderson put forward two bills in the Legislative Council to adopt DST measures in 1909 and 1910, and while the latter bill passed, there was public confusion about how the move would impact daily routines, and it was rejected by the House of Assembly. Anderson and Willett subsequently maintained a correspondence until Willett's death in 1915.

The concept of DST became more popular during the First World War, and after Britain adopted the measure, Anderson seized the opportunity to implement it in Newfoundland. He introduced the Daylight Saving Act of 1917 proposing that the clocks move forward one hour on the second Sunday of June and back one hour on the last Sunday in September. Anderson faced opposition from the Fishermen's Protective Union (FPU) who believed that the measure benefited St. John's merchants more than it would positively impact outport fishermen. He countered that labourers who woke up along with the Sun would not be adversely affected, and that the increased exposure to sunlight would be beneficial for the health of the whole population.

The bill was passed by the House of Assembly on June 17, 1917, and Newfoundland became the first North American country to introduce daylight saving measures. After his success, Anderson wrote several articles urging Canada and the United States to adopt a similar DST measure. For some time afterwards, DST became known in Newfoundland as "Anderson's time."

== Later life and death ==
Anderson was a member of the Newfoundland Patriotic Association (NPA) during the First World War and he would travel to England to visit wounded members of the Royal Newfoundland Regiment. Following the war, he established the Dominion Co-operative Building Association, which financed the construction of low-income and veteran's housing. As the company struggled to raise capital, only thirty of 600 projected houses were ultimately built, mostly along Merrymeeting Road in St. John's. Anderson died in St. John's on November 8, 1930.

== Family ==
Anderson was the father of theater producer and screenwriter John Murray Anderson and playwright Captain Hugh Abercrombie Anderson, a member of Order of the British Empire who wrote the musical Auld Lang Syne.
