= Time in Yukon =

Time zone of UTC minus 7 hours

Time zones in Canada

Standard	DST	Time zone name (Note: The time zone column does not have legal meaning and may deviate from the government-designated name of the time zone.)
UTC−07:00 (year-round)		Mountain (Note: Year-round UTC−7 is referred to as Pacific Time (PCT) by the British Columbia government (not to be confused with Pacific Standard Time in the United States) and as Yukon Standard Time by the Yukon government.)
UTC−07:00	UTC−06:00	Mountain
UTC−06:00 (year-round)		Central (Note: Year-round UTC−6 is referred to as Alberta Time by the Alberta government and as Northwest Territories Time by the Northwest Territories government.)
UTC−06:00	UTC−05:00	Central
UTC−05:00 (year-round)		Eastern (Note: Year-round UTC−5 is referred to as Manitoba Standard Time (MBT) by the Manitoba government.)
UTC−05:00	UTC−04:00	Eastern
UTC−04:00 (year-round)		Atlantic
UTC−04:00	UTC−03:00	Atlantic
UTC−03:30	UTC−02:30	Newfoundland

Yukon Standard Time is the name of a time zone established in 2020 and used in the territory of Yukon in Canada. Yukon Standard Time is also referred to as year-round Pacific Daylight Time (PDT) or year-round Mountain Standard Time (MST) as it does not observe daylight saving time, giving it a year-round calculation by subtracting seven hours from Coordinated Universal Time (UTC) resulting in UTC−07:00. This time zone is effectively the same as British Columbia's Pacific Time, used in most of the province since 2026.

== Former Yukon Time Zone (pre-1984) ==
The previous Yukon Time Zone was a time zone in the United States and Canada. Yukon Standard Time (YST) was obtained by subtracting nine hours from UTC resulting in UTC−09:00. (Note: UTC-based calculations began in 1972. Before that they were determined in reference to Greenwich Mean Time) Yukon Daylight Time (YDT) when observed was eight hours behind UTC. In 1983, the United States restructured the UTC−09:00 based time zone and renamed it to Alaska Time Zone in 1984.

== Extent and history ==
When it was created, the Yukon Time Zone included Yukon, and a small region around Yakutat, Alaska. (Alaska had been spread across four different time zones at the time.)

Yukon, which had adopted Yukon Standard Time in 1900 observed a one-hour advance in 1918 and 1919, and again year-round from February 1942 to September 1945 (Yukon War Time then, after V-J Day, Yukon Prevailing Time).

In 1965, from the last Sunday in April to the last Sunday in September, double daylight time – a two-hour advance – was observed. On July 1, 1966, most of the Yukon switched to Pacific Standard Time (PST), which is UTC−08:00, leaving Dawson City and Old Crow on Yukon time. The remaining area changed to the Pacific Time Zone on October 28, 1973, leaving only Yakutat on the Yukon Time Zone.

On October 30, 1983, coincident with the end of daylight saving time, Alaska switched in 1983 from four time zones to two time zones. The areas east of Yakutat set clocks back two hours to change from Pacific Daylight Time to what had been Yukon Standard Time, UTC−09:00, and the time zone was named Alaska Standard Time at the end of November 1984. Yakutat only set clocks back one hour on that date. Most of the remaining longitudes of Alaska left their clocks unchanged on that date, changing from Alaska–Hawaii Daylight Time (UTC−09:00) to the new Alaska Standard Time (UTC−09:00). Some areas that had been on Bering Time (UTC−11:00 in winter, UTC−10:00 in summer) such as Nome set their clocks ahead yet another hour on October 30, 1983, to adopt Alaska Standard Time (the former Yukon Standard Time), effectively changing their standard time zone by two hours. Most of the Aleutian Islands moved from the Bering Time Zone (UTC−11:00) to the Hawaii–Aleutian Standard Time Zone (UTC−10:00) (which was known as the Alaska–Hawaii Standard Time Zone until 1984).

In a motion brought forth in May 2017, the government of Yukon Territory began the process of ending the daylight saving time changes in the territory. DST changeover was officially ended in Yukon on November 1, 2020. Following most of British Columbia adopting year-round UTC−7 on March 8, 2026, Yukon Time is fully aligned British Columbia's Pacific Time.

== See also ==
- Time in Canada
