= Real Canadian Superstore =

Canadian supermarket chain owned by Loblaw Companies

- Official logo as of 2017

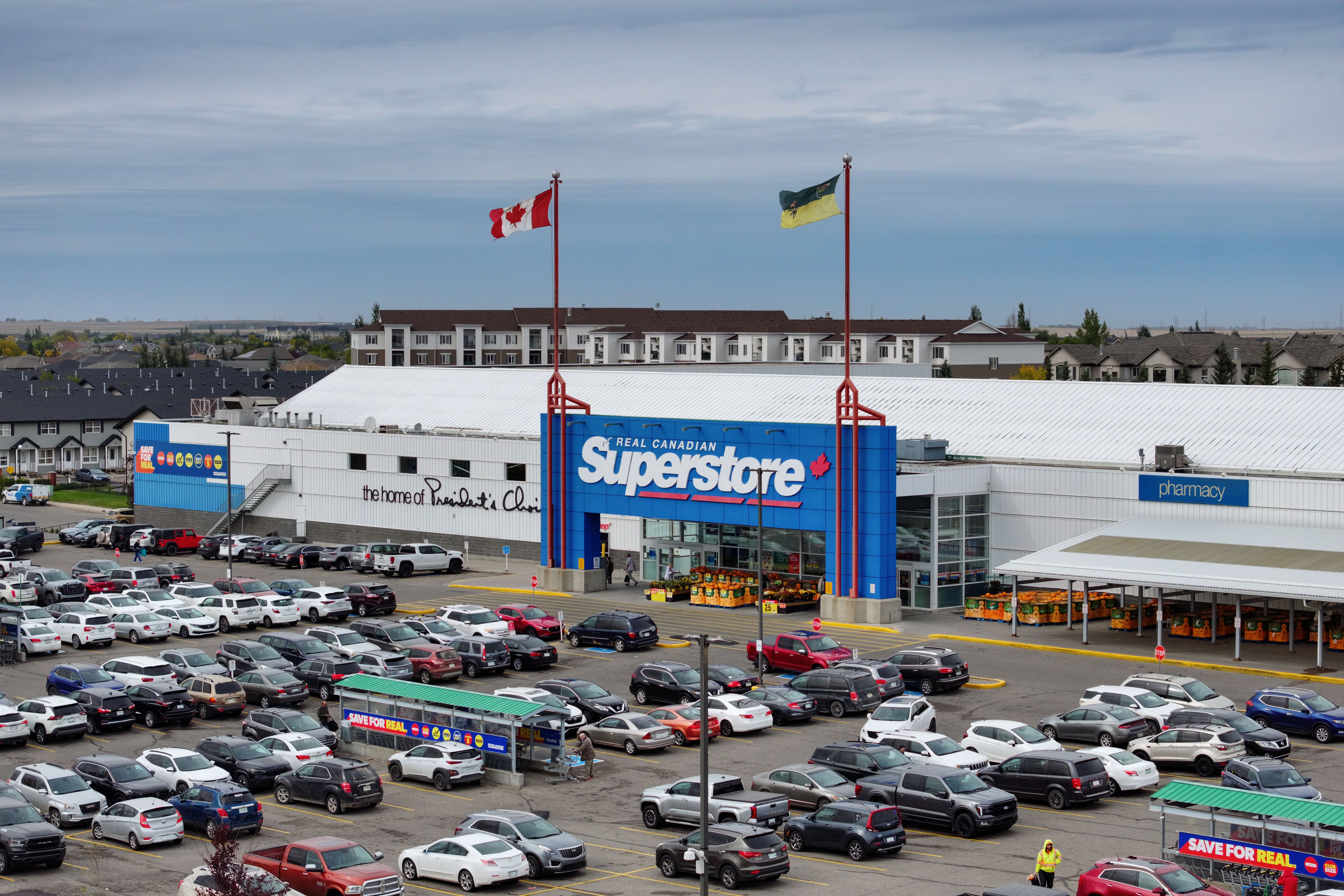
- A location in Regina, Saskatchewan
- Formerly: The Real Canadian Superstore; Loblaw Superstore
- Type: Subsidiary
- Industry: Retail; Supermarket
- Predecessor: SuperValu
- Founded: March 1979; 47 years ago in Saskatoon, Saskatchewan, Canada
- Headquarters: 1 President's Choice Circle, Brampton, Ontario, Canada
- Number of locations: 120 (2024)
- Area served: Ontario; Western Canada; Yukon
- Products: Appliances*, bakery, charcuterie, clothing*, dairy, deli, frozen foods, gardening centre^{†}, general grocery, liquor*, general merchandise, meat & poultry, pharmacy, photolab*, produce, seafood, snacks *Select locations, ^{†}Seasonal
- Brands: No Name; President's Choice
- Services: Click and collect (PC Express), community room, dietitian, dry cleaning, fashion (Joe Fresh), gasoline* (Mobil), fitness club (GoodLife Fitness), optical (Specsavers), pharmacy (Loblaw Pharmacy), photo studio (Photolab), walk-in clinic (medical clinic); *Select locations
- Parent: Loblaw Companies
- Website: realcanadiansuperstore.ca

Real Canadian Superstore is a chain of supermarkets owned by Canadian food retailing giant Loblaw Companies. Its name is often shortened to Superstore, or, less commonly, RCSS.

Originating in Western Canada in the late 1970s/early 1980s, the banner expanded into Ontario in the early 2000s as Loblaw attempted to fend off competition from department stores including U.S.-based Walmart.

Loblaw has tested alternative banners at some locations in Ontario, with some labelled as "Loblaw Superstore", and a few others as simply "Superstore"; for a time, this was reflected in the chain's marketing which used a separate logo to advertise all of these banners. The company has since reverted to marketing the entire chain as Real Canadian Superstore, although some locations might retain other signage.

== Overview ==
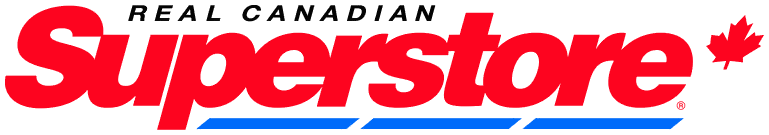
Logo used from 2007 to 2017, still in use at some locations.

Logo used until 2007, still used for signage in a few locations

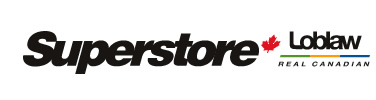
Logo previously used in advertising in Ontario; generic type for both Loblaw Superstore and Real Canadian Superstore

The stores carry a variety of goods, but the vast majority of space is devoted to groceries, and about a third of each store is set aside for electronics, housewares, and clothing. Items in the latter two categories are mainly from Loblaw's private labels, such as President's Choice, Life at Home, No Name, or Joe Fresh. As with many Loblaw stores, they offer corporate-branded services such as PhotoLab photo finishing and DrugStore pharmacies. Many outlets also boast a GoodLife Fitness club, drive-through pharmacies, Mobil gas bars, photo studios, community rooms, as well as walk-in medical clinics managed by Primacy Medical.

Loblaws is working to cut costs and compete effectively with this multi-format store. Each store has a similar layout, useful for both cost efficiency and shopper ease. Also, in an effort to cater to individual customer segments, Superstore buys specific products for different regions. Superstore locations now top 20,000 square metres (220,000 sq ft).

In the west, Superstores are operated by Loblaw subsidiary Westfair Foods Ltd. Ontario stores are operated as part of Loblaw's other banners, including Loblaws and Zehrs, although Superstore is considered a separate chain, and prices at one chain may not apply at the other. Loblaw is centralizing its head office operations, which includes the relocation of the General Merchandise personnel from Calgary, Alberta, to Brampton, Ontario, to consolidate operations.

In Alberta, where private liquor retailing is permitted, a chain of Real Canadian Liquorstores operate, mostly in proximity to Real Canadian Superstore locations in the province.

Employees of Loblaws and the Real Canadian Superstore are members of the United Food and Commercial Workers (UFCW) union.

== History ==
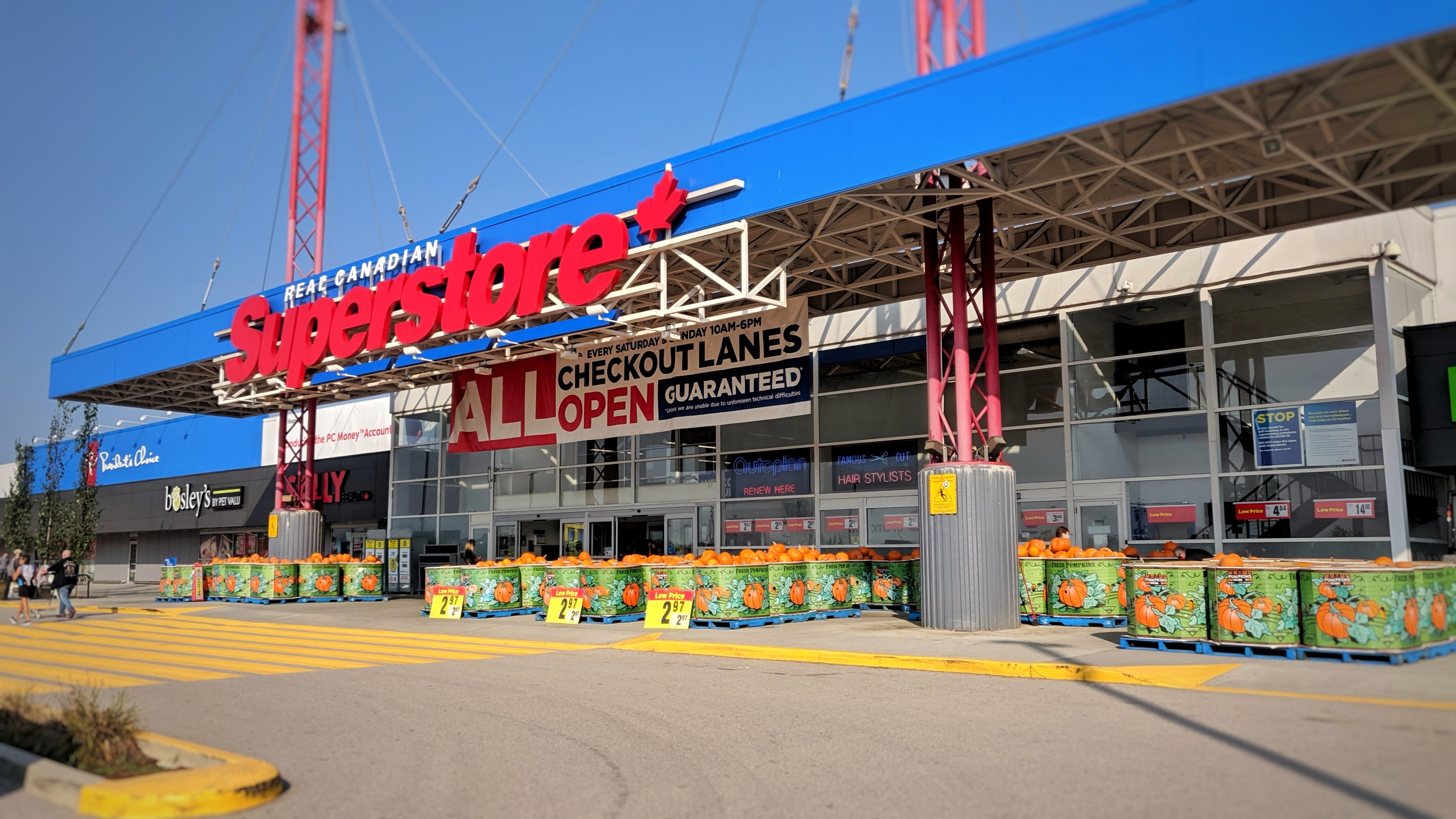
Real Canadian Superstore exterior in 2020

The first Real Canadian Superstore location opened in March 1979 in a former Loblaws location in Saskatoon, Saskatchewan under the name SuperValu. Numerous other SuperValu locations opened across Western Canada before most gradually expanded into Superstore sites; the SuperValu name is still in use in British Columbia.

The similarly-named Real Superstore was a United States chain from the 1970s up until the mid-1990s. It was owned by National Supermarkets (a brand of Loblaws) until it was purchased by Schnucks.

Superstore marks the return of Loblaw's superstore format in the Greater Toronto Area after the unsuccessful launch of the SuperCentre format in the 1980s and 1990s. In the early 21st century, Loblaw brought the Superstore banner to Ontario as a response to the introduction of large grocery sections in most Canadian Wal-Mart stores and other department stores, and as a pre-emptive strike against any plans by Wal-Mart to bring its "Supercenter" format to Canada. Originally, Ontario stores were co-branded with the local Loblaw banner (i.e., "Loblaws - The Real Canadian Superstore"), but most shortened their name to reduce confusion and allow separate weekly specials for each chain.

New Ontario locations began to open under the name Loblaw Superstore in late 2007. Since December 2008, Ontario stores have used common flyers displaying a combined "Superstore: Loblaw/Real Canadian" logo. However, Loblaw has not yet said whether one banner will eventually replace the other.

== Relationship with other Loblaw banners ==
In August 2024, Loblaw began the process of rebranding its Atlantic Superstore banner to Real Atlantic Superstore, updating the name, logo, and branding to align better with RCSS. A similar rebrand occurred simultaneously with Dominion stores in Newfoundland and Labrador, with the logo and branding updated, though keeping the Dominion name. The stated goal of the rebrand is to help customers make value choices, as well as reduce operating costs by aligning with a national chain.

In Quebec, Maxi and Co. and some larger Provigo (previously Loblaws) locations fill the void.

As well, there are a handful of large-format Loblaws and Zehrs stores in Ontario – including certain locations in Markham and Kitchener – which closely replicate the selection of food and general merchandise available at Superstores. Most of these locations were built around the same time as the first Ontario Superstores, but nevertheless chose to use older brand names.

== Slogans ==
- 2022–present — "Save For Real."
- 2019–2020 — "Shop Like A Mother"
- 2018 — "Truly Super"
- 2016-2017 — "We’re not just a store, we’re Superstore. And we don’t do average"
- 2008–2015 — "Big on Fresh, Low on Price"
- 2007 — "Great brands at great prices"

== See also ==
- Real Atlantic Superstore
- Real Canadian Liquorstore
- Dominion
- Loblaw Companies
- Extra Foods
- List of supermarket chains in Canada
