= Thomas R. Bennett =

Newfoundland politician and judge (1830–1901)

Thomas R. Bennett MHA
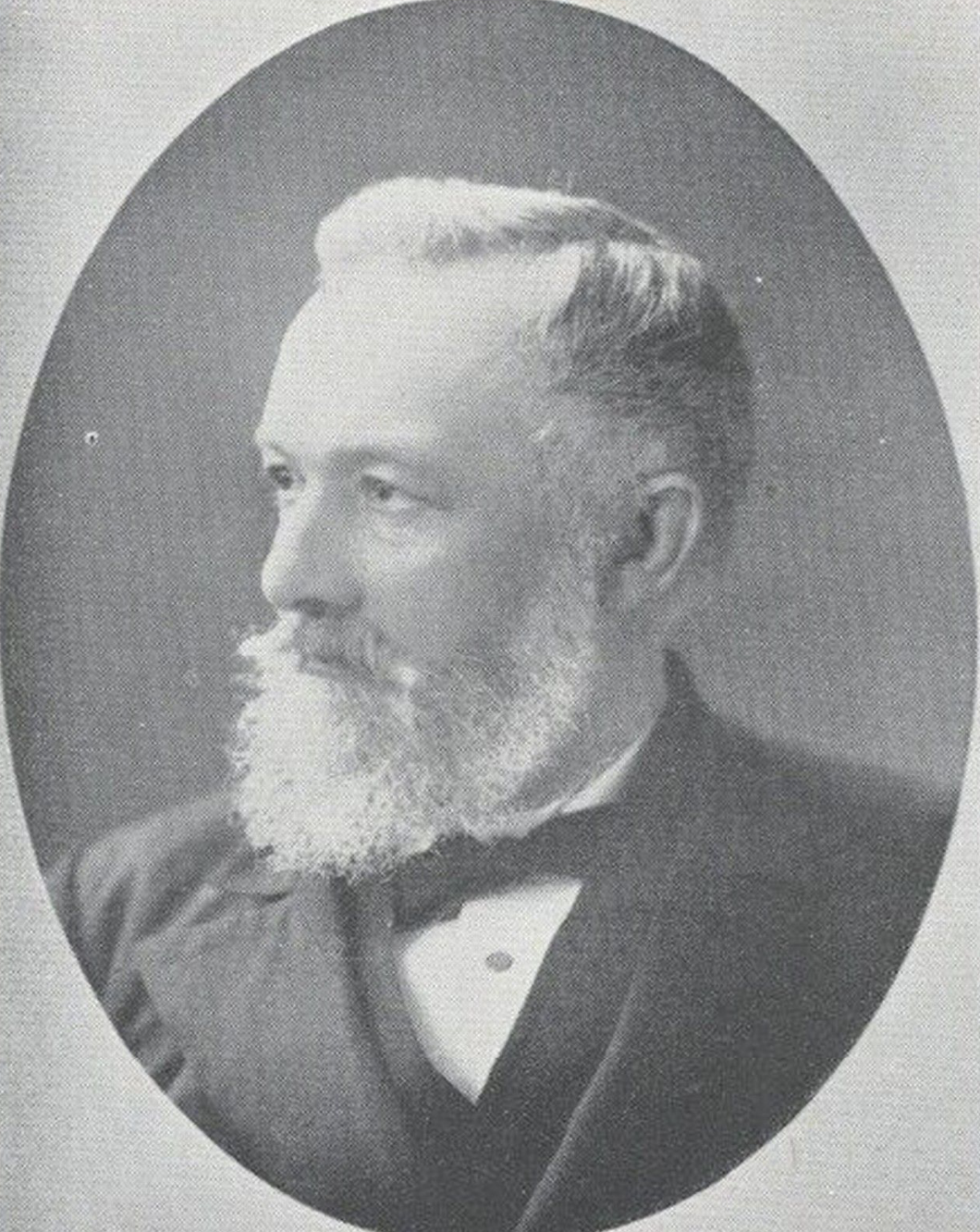
- Bennett in 1894

9th Speaker of the Newfoundland House of Assembly
- In office 1870–1873
- Preceded by: William Whiteway
- Succeeded by: Prescott Emerson

Member of the Newfoundland House of Assembly for Fortune Bay
- In office November 7, 1865 – 1873
- Preceded by: Robert Carter
- Succeeded by: Robert Alexander

Personal details
- Born: Thomas Robert Bennett; 1830 Windsor, Nova Scotia
- Died: August 13, 1901 (aged 70–71) Harbour Grace, Newfoundland Colony
- Party: Conservative
- Occupation: Merchant

Thomas R. Bennett (1830 – August 13, 1901) was a magistrate and political figure in Newfoundland. He represented Fortune Bay in the Newfoundland and Labrador House of Assembly from 1865 to 1874.

== Business career and politics ==
Bennett was born in Windsor, Nova Scotia. In 1853, he moved to Fortune Bay where he established a fishing supply business that traded primarily with the Southern United States until the outbreak of the American Civil War in 1861. Bennett was then elected to the House of Assembly as a Conservative supporter of Premier Frederick Carter for the district of Fortune Bay.

However, as the issue of Confederation with Canada became paramount, Bennett emerged as a prominent anti-Confederate, and he was elected as the Speaker of the House of Assembly when the Anti-Confederate party, led by Charles Fox Bennett, won the 1869 election.

== Legal career ==
Although he was re-elected in the 1873 election, Bennett did not take his seat in the house as Premier Bennett had appointed him as a district court judge in Harbour Grace. When American fishermen had their fishing equipment destroyed by local Fortune Bay fishermen and petitioned for $103,000 in damages, Bennett wrote the Newfoundland Colony's argument for the Halifax Fisheries Commission and successfully negotiated the payment down to $17,000. He was also one of the primary enforcers of the Bait Act under the second William Whiteway administration in 1890.

Bennett retired as a judge in 1898, and then died in Harbour Grace on August 13, 1901.
