= Real Atlantic Superstore =

Maritime subsidiary of the Loblaw Companies

- Current logo as of August 2024

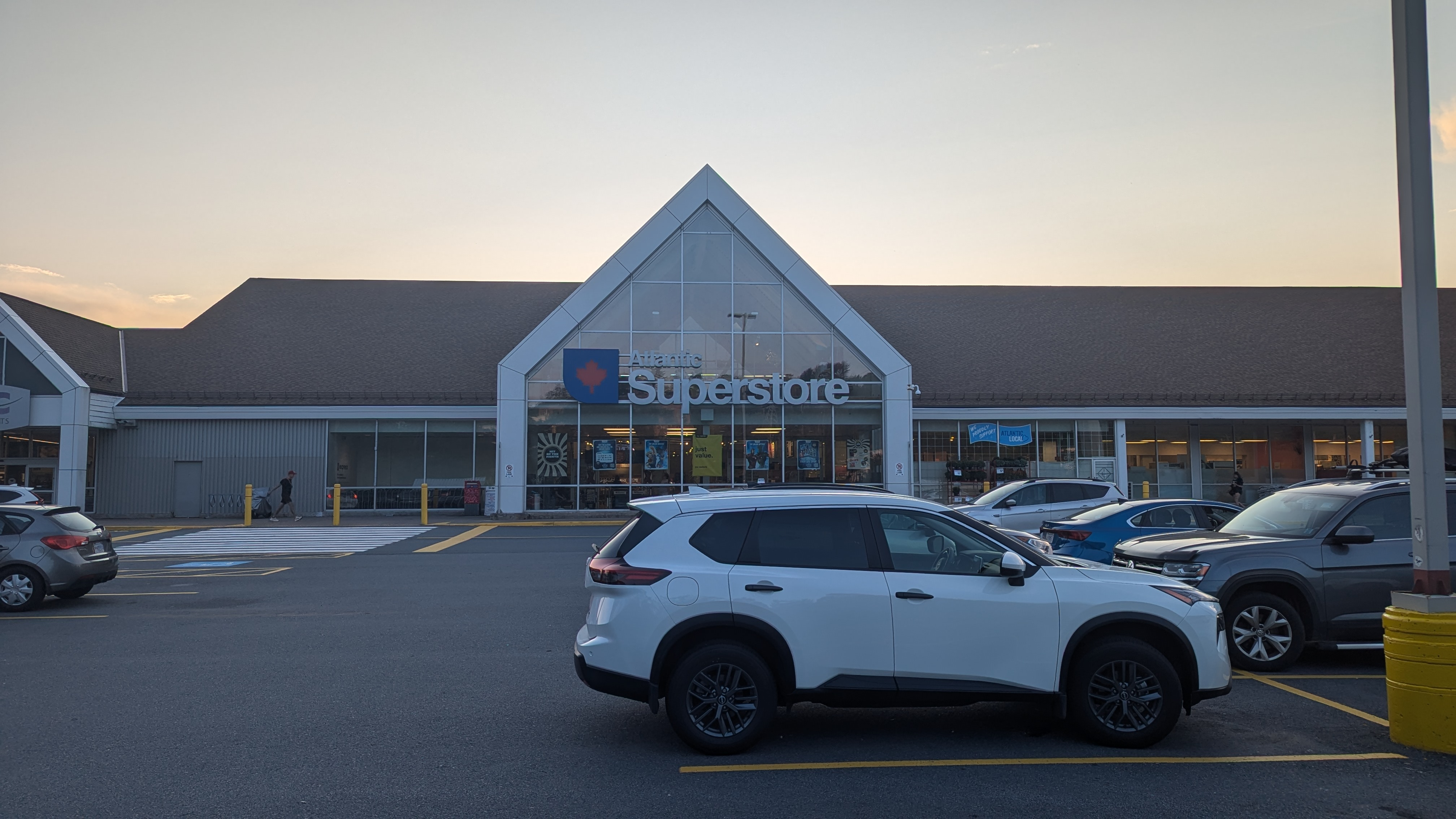
- A store located in Bedford, Nova Scotia
- Formerly: The Real Atlantic Superstore; Atlantic Superstore (2014-2024)
- Type: Subsidiary
- Industry: Retail; Supermarket
- Predecessor: Atlantic SuperValu; SaveEasy
- Founded: 1986; 40 years ago in Moncton, New Brunswick, Canada
- Headquarters: 3601 Joseph Howe Drive, Halifax, Nova Scotia, Canada
- Number of locations: 52 (2024)
- Area served: The Maritimes
- Products: Appliances*, bakery, charcuterie, clothing*, dairy, deli, frozen foods, gardening centre^{†}, general grocery, general merchandise, meat & poultry, pharmacy, produce, seafood, snacks *Select locations, ^{†}Seasonal
- Brands: No Name; President's Choice
- Services: Click and collect (PC Express), community room, dietitian, dry cleaning, fashion (Joe Fresh), gasoline (Mobil), liquor store, optical, pharmacy, photo studio (Photolab), smoke shop, walk-in clinic Select locations
- Parent: Loblaw Companies Limited
- Slogan: (Real Atlantic Superstore) Save For Real.
- Website: atlanticsuperstore.ca

Previous logo from 2014 to 2024.

Real Atlantic Superstore is a Canadian supermarket chain. The chain operates in the Maritime Provinces of New Brunswick, Nova Scotia, and Prince Edward Island. It is owned by George Weston Limited through Loblaw Companies Limited, and operates under the Atlantic Wholesalers division of Loblaws. Its name is often shortened to Superstore, or, less commonly, RASS.

== Store services ==
Despite the similarity in name to sister chain Real Canadian Superstore, not all Real Atlantic Superstores are hypermarkets: many are large supermarkets with little general merchandise. Others, however, are marketed as "one stop" stores (much like Real Canadian Superstore) and carry a wide variety of goods, including groceries, electronics, housewares, clothing, and generally offer services such as photo finishing and a pharmacy.

Previous logo used from 1992 to 2014. Used in an all-orange scheme after 2010.

Real Atlantic Superstore has added self checkout registers at its larger stores which allow customers to scan the barcode of an item and make payment without any interaction with store employees.

Starting on April 22, 2009, some locations began charging 5 cents per plastic bag at checkouts, to promote the use of environmentally friendly reusable bags. On March 1, 2010, this practice was stopped. Following Canada's single-use plastics ban, plastic bags are no longer available in stores. 15 cent paper bags are available for purchase at some, but not all locations.

In December 2017, click and collect, under the PC Express banner began in Atlantic Canada, starting with Atlantic Superstore locations in Halifax.

== History ==
Loblaw entered Atlantic Canada through the acquisition of Atlantic Wholesalers, owner of the SaveEasy chain, in 1976.

In 1986, the company opened its first large-scale grocery store in Moncton, New Brunswick, using the name The Real Atlantic Superstore. In 1995, the name was shortened to Atlantic Superstore, and following the 2024 rebrand, the name was lengthened again to the present name, Real Atlantic Superstore. Further, the store designs were reformatted to the "market style" with the slogan "Low Prices and More!". Most SaveEasy stores, excluding those in rural areas, were eventually converted to the SuperValu or Superstore format, either through renovation or relocation.

During the 1990s, the company's headquarters were relocated from Sackville, New Brunswick to Dartmouth, Nova Scotia. New warehousing facilities for just in time logistics distribution were built, and a huge expansion campaign brought new large-format stores to many centres in the region within a period of only several years. In the early 2000s, a marketing campaign was introduced to the superstores, changing their slogan to "Eat Well, Spend Less". This was like a campaign carried out in Loblaws stores in Ontario. With the arrival of the Real Canadian Superstore concept in Ontario, Real Atlantic Superstore used a similar marketing campaign with the slogan "Prices You Can Trust". This concept was used until 2009 when the "Just Lower Prices" campaign was launched.

On August 8, 2024, Real Atlantic Superstore launched its anticipated but controversial rebrand that better aligned the banner with its sister chain Real Canadian Superstore. The rebrand brought about new signage within and outside of its stores. The name, Real Atlantic Superstore, will be retained, despite earlier rumours that the name would be discontinued and replaced with Real Canadian Superstore. However, with the rebrand, came a new logo, which did take on RCSS's branding style with a new logo to match, now including "Real" in the name. RASS also adopted RCSS's slogan, "Save for Real." The changes in store are said to help direct customers in store and help them make value choices.

== Slogans ==
- "Low Prices and More!"
- "Eat Well, Spend Less"
- "Prices You Can Trust"
- "Just Lower Prices"
- "Bringing More to the Table"
- 2024–present — "Save For Real."

== See also ==
- List of supermarket chains in Canada
- Dominion
- Real Canadian Superstore
