= Hugh Abercrombie Anderson =

Canadian writer

Hugh "Abercrombie" Anderson MBE
- Born: 10 February 1890; St. John's, Newfoundland Colony
- Died: 9 November 1965 (aged 75); Queens, New York, U.S.
- Occupations: Military Officer (Captain), manager of a theatrical business
- Writing career
- Pen name: Hugh Abercrombie

Captain Hugh Abercrombie Anderson MBE (10 February 1890 – 9 November 1965) was a Newfoundland writer.

Born in St. John's, Anderson was the son of politician, John Anderson. Following an education at Bishop Feild College and Edinburgh Academy, the first few years of his career were at the family business in St. John's, after which Anderson entered the military and rose to the rank of Captain. In 1921, he became manager of a theatrical business in New York City owned by his brother John Murray Anderson, a director and producer. Anderson's dramatization of Robert Louis Stevenson's The Suicide Club received favourable reviews in 1929. He also co-authored the libretto for Lola Carrier Worrell's musical Babylonia.

Under the pen name of Hugh Abercrombie he wrote the musical Auld Lang Syne.

Anderson was made MBE. He died at his home in Queens, New York.

== See also ==
- List of people of Newfoundland and Labrador
- List of communities in Newfoundland and Labrador
