= Joseph Boyd (politician) =

Newfoundland politician (1835–1898)

Joseph Boyd MHA
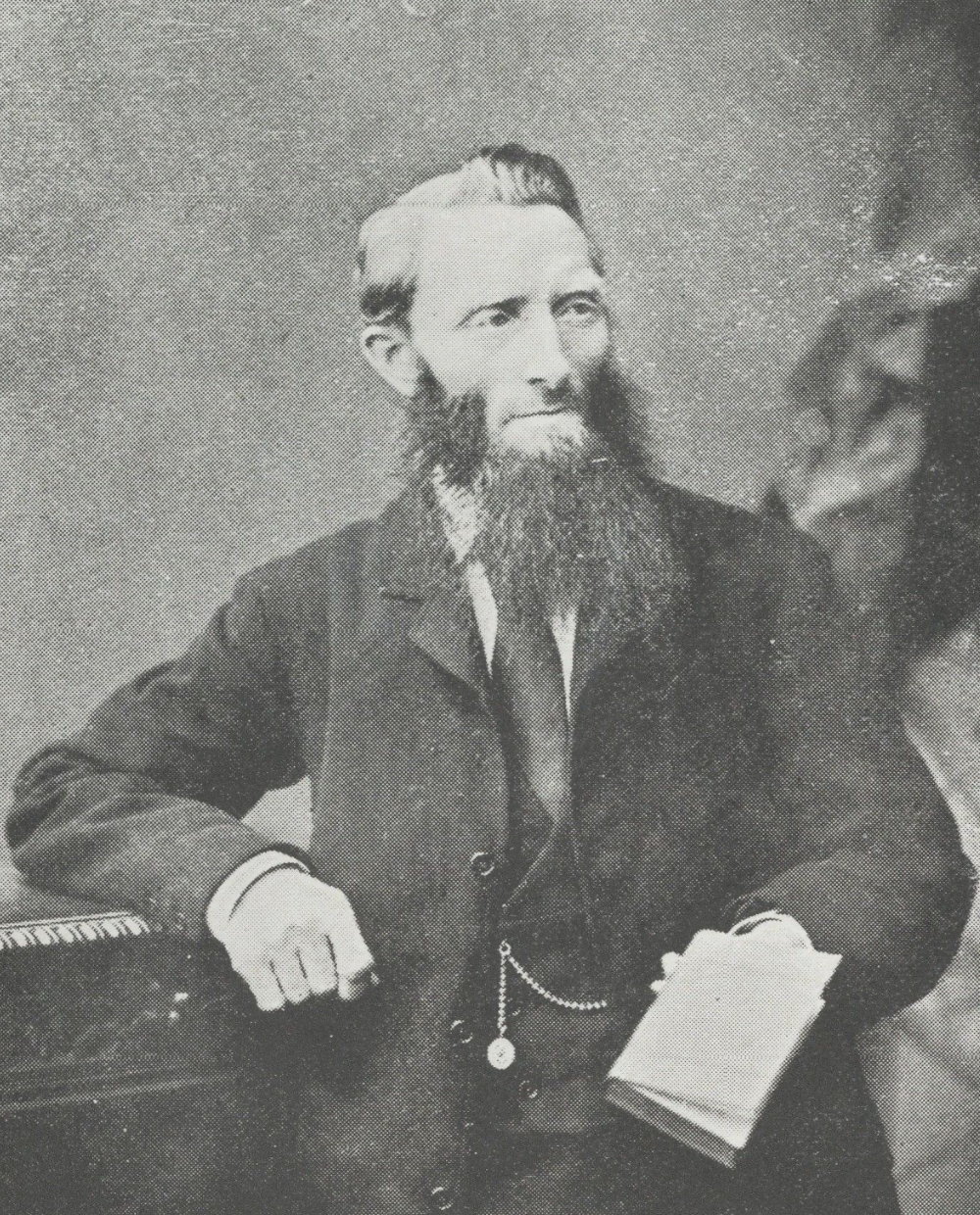
- Boyd in 1894

Member of the Newfoundland House of Assembly for Trinity Bay
- In office November 6, 1882 – October 31, 1885 Serving with Robert Bond and William Whiteway
- Preceded by: John Rendell; James H. Watson
- Succeeded by: Walter B. Grieve; Robert Thorburn; Ellis C. Watson

Personal details
- Born: November 8, 1835 St. John's, Newfoundland Colony
- Died: July 15, 1898 (aged 62) Carbonear, Newfoundland Colony
- Party: Conservative
- Spouse: Sarah Mews (m. 1868)
- Occupation: Blacksmith

Joseph Boyd (November 8, 1835 – July 15, 1898) was a blacksmith and politician in Newfoundland. As a Conservative supporter of Premier William Whiteway, he represented Trinity Bay in the Newfoundland House of Assembly from 1882 to 1885.

== Family and politics ==
Boyd was born on November 8, 1835 in St. John's, Newfoundland as the son of James and Martha Boyd. His father's family hailed from County Wexford, Ireland, and his mother's family were American Loyalists.

Boyd became a blacksmith and took an active interest in Newfoundland politics. He successfully ran for the House of Assembly as a Conservative candidate for the district of Trinity Bay in 1882, where he served alongside Premier William Whiteway and eventual Prime Minister Robert Bond. Choosing to retire following the political chaos caused by the Harbour Grace Affray, he was appointed as the sergeant-at-arms in the House of Assembly in 1885. After becoming a Justice of the Peace in 1889, Boyd attempted to re-enter the assembly as a Liberal supporter of Whiteway in an 1892 by-election for the district of Burin, losing to James S. Winter.

Following his electoral defeat, Boyd was named superintendent of the St. John's Poor Asylum. He died in Carbonear on July 15, 1898.
