= SuperValu (Canada) =

Canadian supermarket chain

- Industry: Retail
- Founded: 1951; 75 years ago
- Founder: Kelly Douglas Limited
- Headquarters: Canada
- Parent: Loblaw Companies

SuperValu is a chain of franchised and independent grocery stores in Canada that currently operates in the provinces of British Columbia and Alberta.

== Background ==
Founded in British Columbia in 1951 by Loblaw Companies Limited as a chain of independently-owned supermarkets supplied by Loblaws' wholesale subsidiary, Kelly Douglas & Company. In the 1960s, 1970s and 1980s, many SuperValu stores were created from former Loblaws corporate stores as the banner expanded across western Canada. Loblaw Companies Limited (through its Westfair Foods division) still supplies SuperValu stores and owns the SuperValu name.

In the mid-1970s, a larger version of SuperValu was created - dubbed the Real Canadian Superstore, these warehouse-sized grocery stores were closer to department stores in scope. Today, only a handful of smaller SuperValu stores remain, all in British Columbia. Most others have either been rebranded to other Loblaw banners, such as Extra Foods, Your Independent Grocer or expanded into Real Canadian Superstore outlets (or the related Real Canadian Wholesale Club). Atlantic SuperValu stores have since been replaced by the larger Real Atlantic Superstore.

== See also ==
- List of supermarket chains in Canada
