= James Gervé Conroy =

Newfoundland politician (1836-1915)

James Gervé Conroy MHA
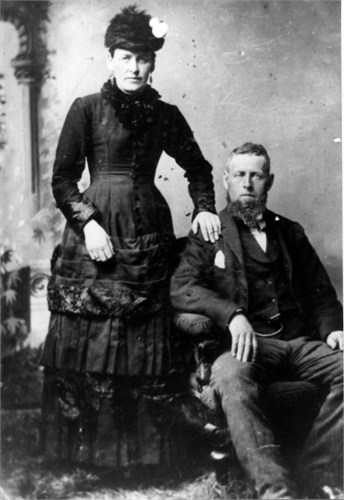
- Conroy and his wife

Member of the Newfoundland House of Assembly for Ferryland
- In office November 7, 1874 – November 2, 1880 Serving with Richard Raftus (1874–1878); Daniel Greene (1878–1880)
- Preceded by: Thomas Glen
- Succeeded by: Augustus F. Goodridge

Personal details
- Born: James Gervé Conroy; April 12, 1836 Boyle, County Roscommon, Ireland, U.K.
- Died: January 28, 1915 (aged 78) Montreal, Quebec, Canada
- Party: Opposition
- Spouse: Elizabeth O'Neill (m. 1870)
- Children: 1 son (Charles)
- Occupation: Lawyer, teacher

James Gervé Conroy (April 12, 1836 – January 28, 1915) was an Irish-born lawyer, judge and politician in Newfoundland. He represented Ferryland in the Newfoundland House of Assembly from 1874 to 1880, where he was one of the leaders of the opposition against William Whiteway and his government's railway policy.

== Early life and family ==
Conroy was from Boyle, County Roscommon in Ireland. After studying law in Ireland and Paris, he was admitted to the English and Irish bars. In 1870, he married Elizabeth Catherine Mary Theresa O'Neill, the daughter of a barrister from Dublin. They had a son, Charles O'Neill Conroy, who would also become a lawyer.

Conroy and his young family emigrated to St. John's, Newfoundland in 1872, where he taught at the private Catholic school St. Bonaventure's College while awaiting his admission to the Newfoundland bar. Following his 1873 admission, Conroy established a legal firm with John Hoyles Boone called Boone and Conroy. In 1875, he became the founding editor of the St. John's Advertiser newspaper, later renamed the Terra Nova Advocate, which promoted the interests of the Catholic community in St. John's.

== Politics ==
Conroy was elected to the Newfoundland House of Assembly in 1874 as a representative of the district of Ferryland. He opposed Conservative premiers Frederick Carter and William Whiteway, and he emerged as one of the leaders of the opposition against the Whiteway government alongside Robert Pinsent in the subsequent 1878 election. Although Conroy had the support of the Catholic clergy, Whiteway's policy promoting the development of a trans-insular railway was broadly popular. While on the campaign trail in Tors Cove within his own district, Conroy was assaulted by a group of Catholic men, who threw lobs of rotten squid at him and Father Nicholas Roche. The opposition party, loosely organized and broadly unpopular, were soundly defeated by Whiteway's government, although Conroy saw re-election in his district of Ferryland.

== Later life ==
Conroy retired from politics in 1880 and was named a stipendiary magistrate and a judge in the court for the Central District. He served on the bench until his death in Montreal at the age of 78 while receiving medical treatment there. Conroy was buried in St. John's.
