= Newfoundland Time Zone =

Time zone in Newfoundland and Labrador

- Time zone
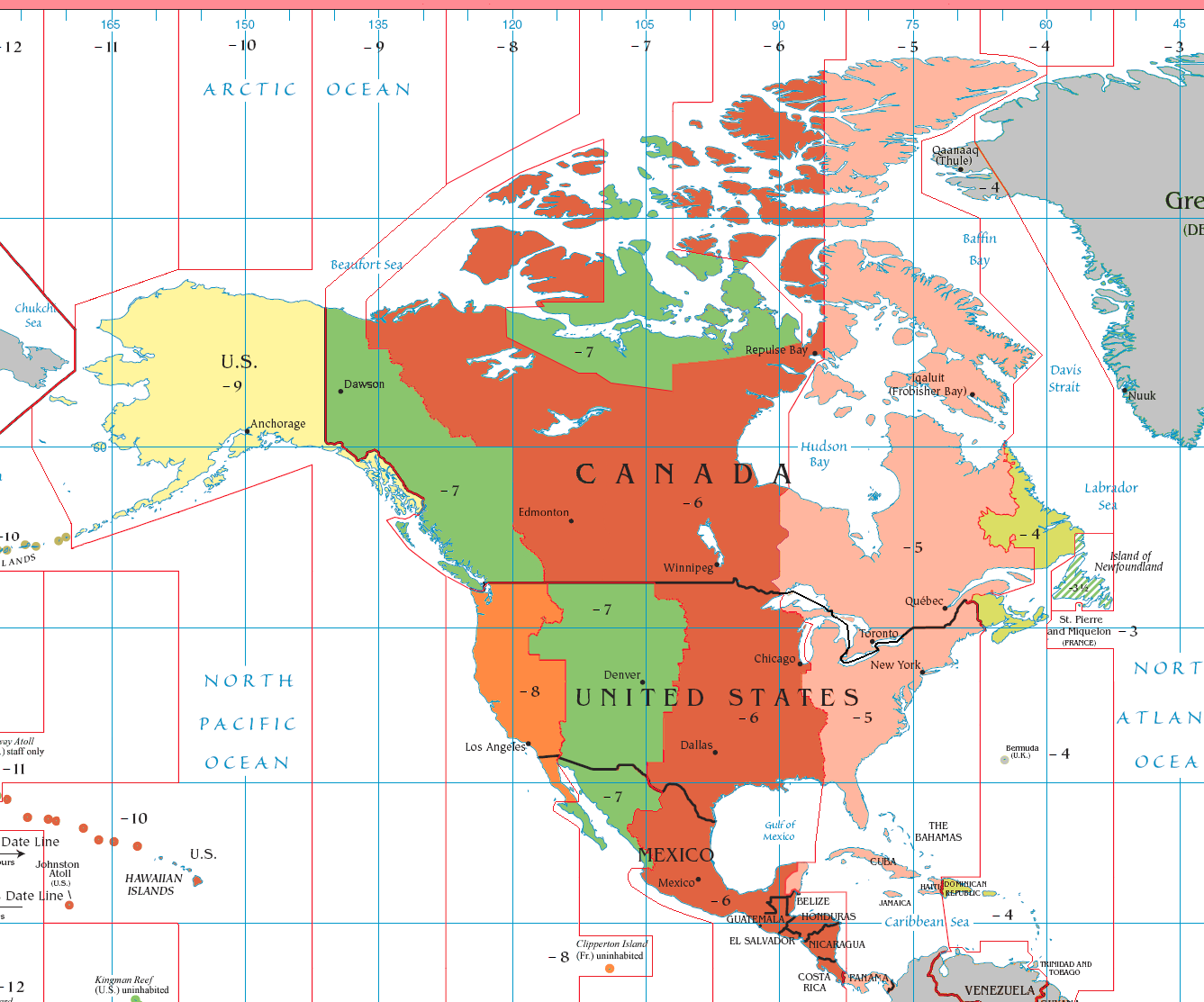

UTC offset
- NST: UTC−03:30
- NDT: UTC−02:30

Current time
- :: NST [refresh] :: NDT [refresh]

Observance of DST
- DST is observed throughout this time zone.

The Newfoundland Time Zone (NT) is a geographic region that keeps time by subtracting 3.5 hours from Coordinated Universal Time (UTC) during standard time, resulting in UTC−03:30; or subtracting 2.5 hours during daylight saving time. The clock time in this zone is based on the mean solar time of the meridian 52 degrees and 30 arcminutes west of the Greenwich Observatory. It is observed solely in the Canadian province of Newfoundland and Labrador. The Newfoundland Time Zone is the only active time zone with a half-hour offset from UTC in the Americas.

== Scope ==
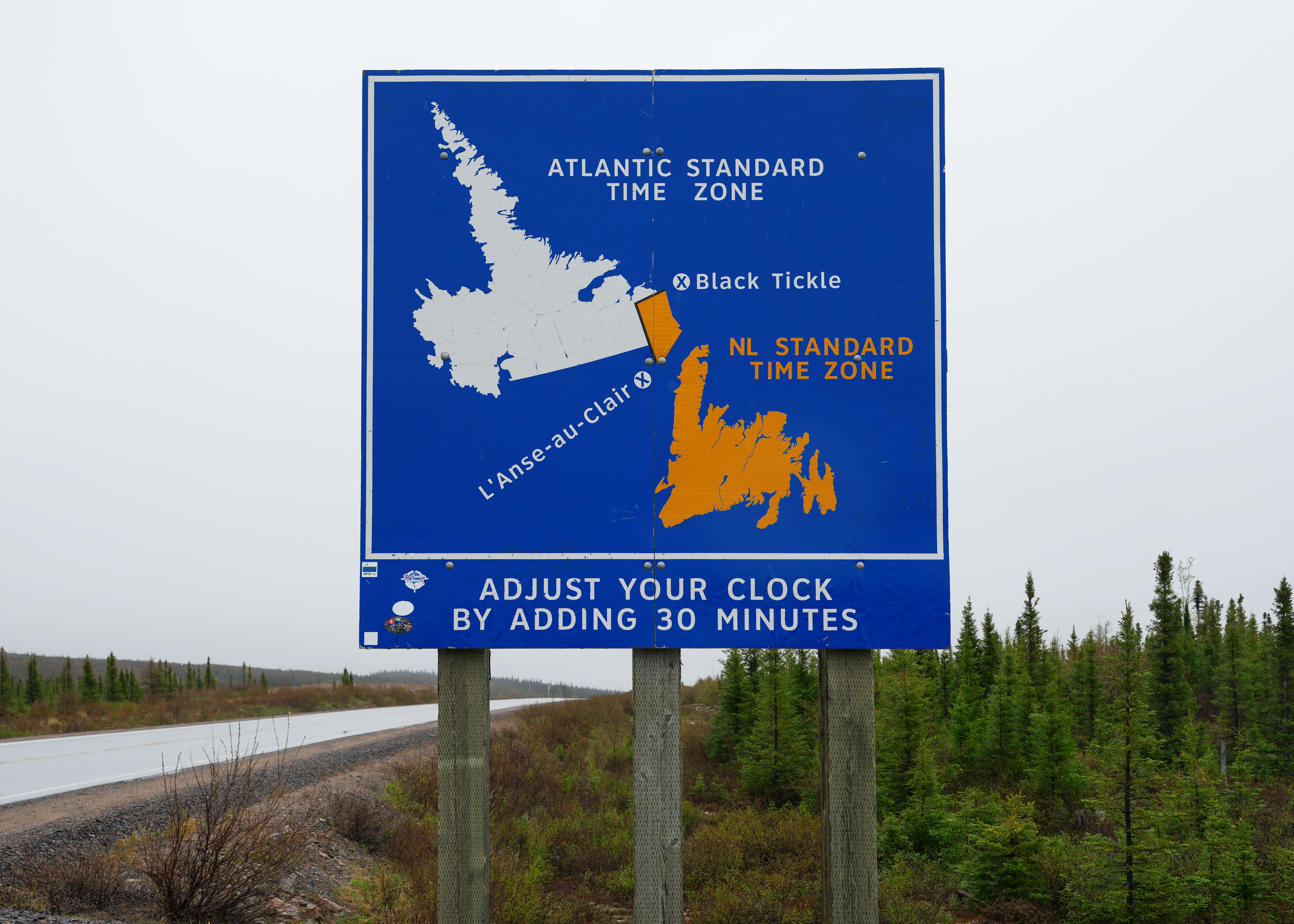
Newfoundland time-zone sign on the Trans-Labrador Highway between Cartwright Junction and Port Hope Simpson

Officially, per Newfoundland and Labrador provincial law, the entire province observes Newfoundland Time. In practice, however, Newfoundland Time is observed only on the island of Newfoundland, its smaller offshore islands, and the southeastern Labrador communities including and south of Black Tickle. The rest of Labrador, from Cartwright north and west, observes Atlantic Time along with the rest of Atlantic Canada. Southeastern Labrador prefers Newfoundland Time in part to synchronize with the schedule of radio broadcasts from Newfoundland.

This time zone exists because of the location of the island, with St. John's being exactly three-and-a-half hours from Greenwich. In 1935, the Newfoundland Commission of Government adopted a Standard Time Act which set standard time across the Dominion of Newfoundland at 3.5 hours behind Greenwich Mean Time (GMT).

In 1963, the Newfoundland government attempted to move the province to Atlantic Time in tandem with the rest of Atlantic Canada, but withdrew in the face of stiff public opposition.

Daylight saving time is observed throughout the province. In 1988, the provincial government experimented with double daylight saving time, moving clocks ahead two hours during daylight saving time instead of just one. However, this forced children to go to school in the dark in October. In 2006, the province enacted an extension to daylight saving time, starting in 2007, following the lead of the United States and other Canadian provinces.

This unusual time zone puts the island of Newfoundland an hour and a half ahead of Central Canada, a half hour ahead of the rest of Atlantic Canada, and half an hour behind Saint-Pierre and Miquelon. Because of this, it will hit milestones of time before (almost) any other part of the continent, a quirk that draws attention to Newfoundland. For instance, the Newfoundland releases of Harry Potter and the Half-Blood Prince and Halo 2 were publicized across Canada. Also, it is very common for the lone independently owned-and-operated TV station in the province, CJON-DT (known on-air as "NTV"), to use a "World Television Premiere" bumper at the start of some programming that airs before most other North American stations air them.

Likewise, in the case of Canada-wide broadcasts timed to air at the same local hour in the rest of the country through the use of a different feed for each time zone (most commonly the CBC's radio and TV networks), Newfoundland uses Atlantic-time broadcasts. References to programs airing thirty minutes "later" than the Maritimes (e.g. "6:00, 6:30 in Newfoundland") are commonly heard across Canada. However, the province's two full-fledged stations, CJON and CBNT-DT (both based in St. John's), originate local programming with phrasing such as "coming up at 6:00, 5:30 in most of Labrador."

== Major metropolitan areas ==
- St. John's, Newfoundland and Labrador
- Corner Brook, Newfoundland and Labrador

== See also ==
- Newfoundland's Daylight Saving Act of 1917
