= Peter G. Tessier =

Canadian politician

Peter Germon Tessier (1819 – 1886) was an English-born merchant in Newfoundland. He served in the Legislative Council of Newfoundland.

He was born in Newton Abbott, Devon and came to Newfoundland with his brother Lewis in 1842. The brothers were partners with Samuel Langley until 1847, when they opened a fishery supply business. The company expanded into the trade in salt cod; it continued to operate after his death, closing in 1893.

Tessier was married twice: first to Anne Carter and then to Jane Weston (née Carter); both were daughters of Robert Carter. His son James C. Tessier served in the Newfoundland assembly.
