= James H. Watson =

Newfoundland politician (1845–1908)

James H. Watson MHA
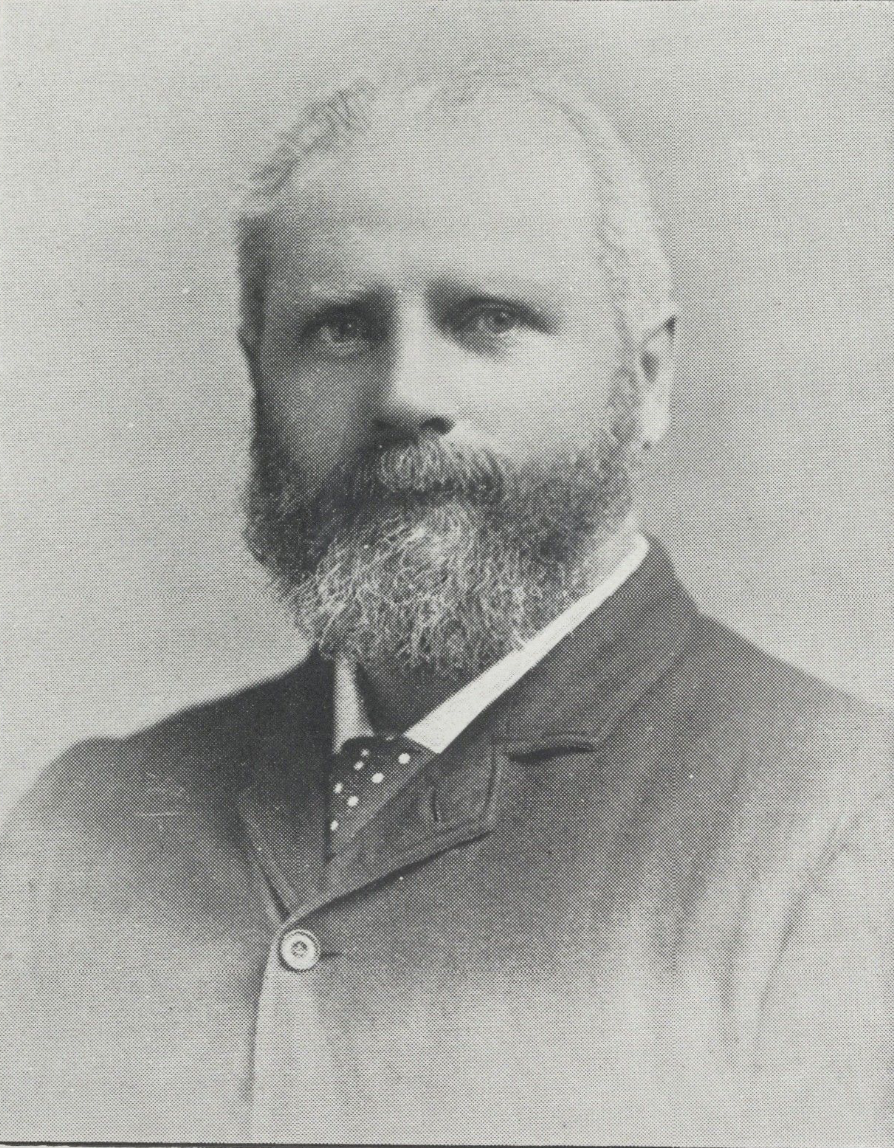
- Watson in 1894

Member of the Newfoundland House of Assembly for Trinity Bay
- In office November 6, 1893 – October 16, 1894 Serving with Robert Bond and William Whiteway
- Preceded by: David Webber
- Succeeded by: George W. Gushue; William Horwood; George M. Johnson
- In office November 7, 1874 – November 6, 1882 Serving with John Steer (1874–1878); William Whiteway (1874–1882); John Rendell (1878–1882)
- Preceded by: John H. Warren
- Succeeded by: Robert Bond; Joseph Boyd

Personal details
- Born: 1845 Torquay, Devon, England, U.K.
- Died: December 28, 1908 (aged 62–63) Torquay, Devon, England, U.K.
- Party: Conservative (1874–1882); Independent (1882); Liberal (1893–1894)
- Spouse(s): Elizabeth Bryatt (m. 1872) ? Reed
- Relatives: Ellis C. Watson (brother); Robert Watson (nephew)
- Occupation: Merchant

James Humphrey Watson (1845 – December 29, 1908) was an English-born merchant and political figure in Newfoundland. He represented Trinity Bay in the Newfoundland and Labrador House of Assembly from 1874 to 1882 and from 1893 to 1894.

== Business career and politics ==
Watson was born in Torquay, Devon as the son of William Watson. He came to Newfoundland in 1869 and entered business with his brother Ellis at Hant's Harbour. The two brothers worked as dealers for the Job Brothers mercantile firm.

Watson entered politics in 1874 when he successfully ran as a Conservative candidate supporting Frederick Carter for the district of Trinity Bay. After winning re-election in 1878, he broke with Carter's successor William Whiteway and unsuccessfully ran as an independent in 1882. His brother Ellis would take his old seat as an opponent to Whiteway in the 1885 election.

In the meantime, James Watson returned to business, setting up in L'Anse-au-Loup, Labrador in 1890. He was appointed as an assistant clerk for the House of Assembly in 1892 before he was elected again in 1893 as a Liberal supporter of Whiteway. However, Watson was unseated by a Conservative-led petition under the Corrupt Practices Act in 1894. Although the Supreme Court of Newfoundland decreed that most of those convicted could not run for office again, Watson was an exception to this rule. Despite this, he chose not to re-enter electoral politics, and he was instead made a customs inspector in St. John's.

Watson returned to England in 1904 and later died at Torquay in 1908.
