= Richard Raftus =

Newfoundland politician (1845–1879)

Richard Raftus MHA

Member of the Newfoundland House of Assembly for Ferryland
- In office November 8, 1873 – November 9, 1878 Serving with Thomas Glen (1873–1874); James G. Conroy (1874–1878)
- Preceded by: Thomas Badcock
- Succeeded by: Daniel Greene

Personal details
- Born: 1845 St. John's, Newfoundland Colony
- Died: September 7, 1879 (aged 33–34) St. John's, Newfoundland Colony
- Party: Anti-Confederation (1873–1874); Liberal (1874–1878)
- Spouse: Hannah Powers
- Occupation: Lawyer

Richard Raftus (1845 – September 7, 1879) was a lawyer and politician in Newfoundland. He represented Ferryland in the Newfoundland House of Assembly from 1874 to 1878.

The son of Thomas Raftus and Mary Butler, he was born in St. John's and was educated at St. Bonaventure's College. Raftus studied law with Joseph Ignatius Little and was admitted to the Newfoundland bar in 1871. He married Hannah Powers. Raftus also wrote poetry and acted in local theatre.

He died suddenly at the age of 34 in St. John's.
