= Churchill Square (St. John's) =

Shopping area in St. John's, Newfoundland, Canada

Churchill Square (St. John's) (Newfoundland and Labrador)

Churchill Square is a shopping area in St. John's, Newfoundland, located on Elizabeth Avenue near Memorial University of Newfoundland. "The Square", as it is often referred to, contains two parallel rows of shops on each side of a parking lot. The eastern row is much more uniform, and contains apartments on the upper levels.

A larger building between the two rows, Terrace on the Square, contains a clock tower and a small shopping mall with several more shops, as well as business offices on the top levels.

Facing the square, across Elizabeth Avenue, is a bust of Winston Churchill. The bust was sculpted by Dr. Elizabeth Bradford Holbrook.
