= Maurice Fenelon =

Newfoundland politician (1834–1897)

The Honourable Maurice Fenelon MHA MLC
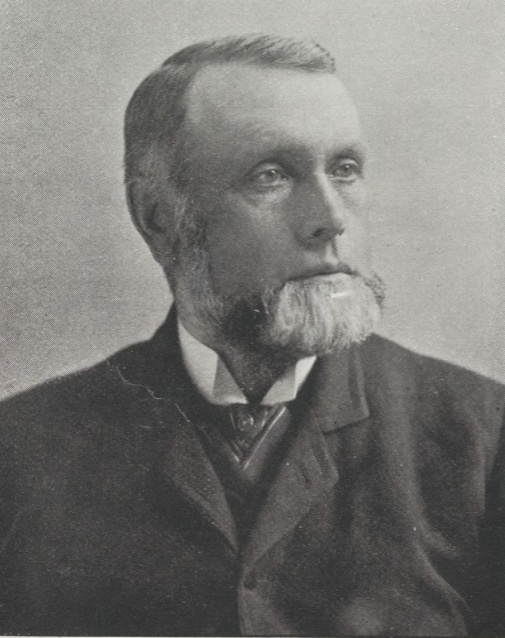

Colonial Secretary
- In office 1886–1889
- Premier: Robert Thorburn
- Preceded by: Edward Dalton Shea
- Succeeded by: Robert Bond

Member of the Legislative Council of Newfoundland
- In office 1894 – January 31, 1897
- Appointed by: Augustus F. Goodridge
- In office 1886–1889
- Appointed by: Robert Thorburn

Member of the Newfoundland House of Assembly for St. John's West
- In office January 16, 1871 – December 1878 Serving with Peter Brennan (1871–1873); Lewis Tessier (1871–1878); Patrick J. Scott (1873–1878)
- Preceded by: Thomas Talbot
- Succeeded by: James McLoughlan

Personal details
- Born: 1834 County Carlow, Ireland
- Died: January 31, 1897 (aged 62–63) St. John's, Newfoundland Colony
- Party: Anti-Confederation (1871–1874); Liberal (1874–1878)
- Spouse: Ellen Kitchen
- Children: 1 (John)
- Occupation: Teacher

Maurice Fenelon (1834 – January 31, 1897) was an Irish-born educator, merchant and political figure in Newfoundland. He represented St. John's West in the Newfoundland and Labrador House of Assembly from 1871 to 1878.

He was born in County Carlow and came to St. John's in 1856 to teach at Saint Bonaventure's College. He moved to the United States in 1867 but by 1870 had returned to St. John's and was teaching at the St John's Academy. He also opened a book store in St. John's. Fenelon married Ellen Kitchen. He was first elected to the Newfoundland assembly in an 1871 by-election as an anti-Confederate. He resigned his seat in 1878 and was named inspector for Roman Catholic schools in 1879. In 1886, he was named to the Legislative Council of Newfoundland and appointed to the Executive Council as colonial secretary by Robert Thorburn. In 1889, he was removed from the Executive Council after a change in government and was an unsuccessful candidate for a seat in the assembly in 1889 and 1892. His business was destroyed in the Great Fire of 1892. Fenelon was named to the Legislative Council in 1894 by Conservative leader Augustus Frederick Goodridge and served until his death in St. John's in 1897. Also in 1894, he was named a director for the Commercial Bank of Newfoundland.

His son, John J. Fenelon (1880-1934) was admitted to the bar in London, and then the Newfoundland Bar. He established a practice in St. John's and became a Bencher with the Law Society. William Joseph Browne, Member of the Canadian Parliament, began his legal career as a law clerk to John Fenelon.
