= Charles R. Ayre =

Newfoundland politician (1819–1889)

The Honourable Charles R. Ayre MLC MHA
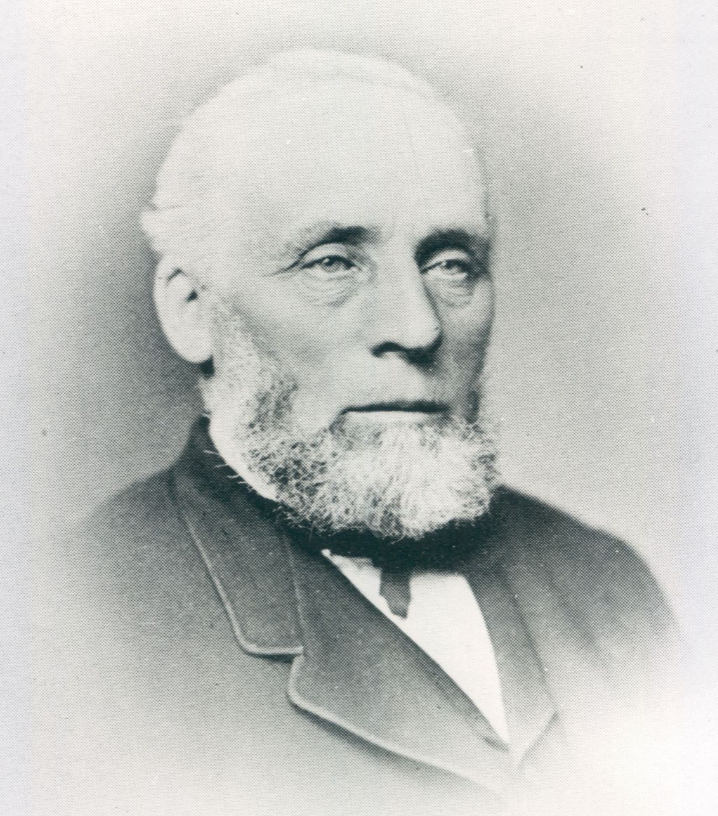

Minister without portfolio
- In office 1885 – April 12, 1889
- Premier: Robert Thorburn

Member of the Legislative Council of Newfoundland
- In office 1879 – April 12, 1889
- Appointed by: William Whiteway

Member of the Newfoundland House of Assembly for Burin
- In office November 8, 1873 – November 9, 1878 Serving with James S. Winter
- Preceded by: Frederick Carter; Edward Evans
- Succeeded by: James J. Rogerson

Personal details
- Born: Charles Robert Ayre; December 19, 1819 Exeter, Devon, England
- Died: April 12, 1889 (aged 69) St. John's, Newfoundland Colony
- Party: Conservative
- Occupation: Businessman

Charles Robert Ayre (December 22, 1819 – April 12, 1889) was an English-born merchant and political figure in Newfoundland. He represented Burin in the Newfoundland House of Assembly from 1873 to 1878 as a Conservative.

He was born in Exeter and came to Newfoundland in 1842 as a clerk. By 1856, he had established his own business, Ayre and Sons, in St. John's with John Steer. Ayre served in the Legislative Council of Newfoundland from 1879 to 1889 and was a minister without portfolio in the Executive Council in 1885. He died in St. John's at the age of 69.

His son John also served in the Newfoundland assembly.
