= John Steer (merchant) =

Newfoundland politician (1824–1918)

John Steer MHA
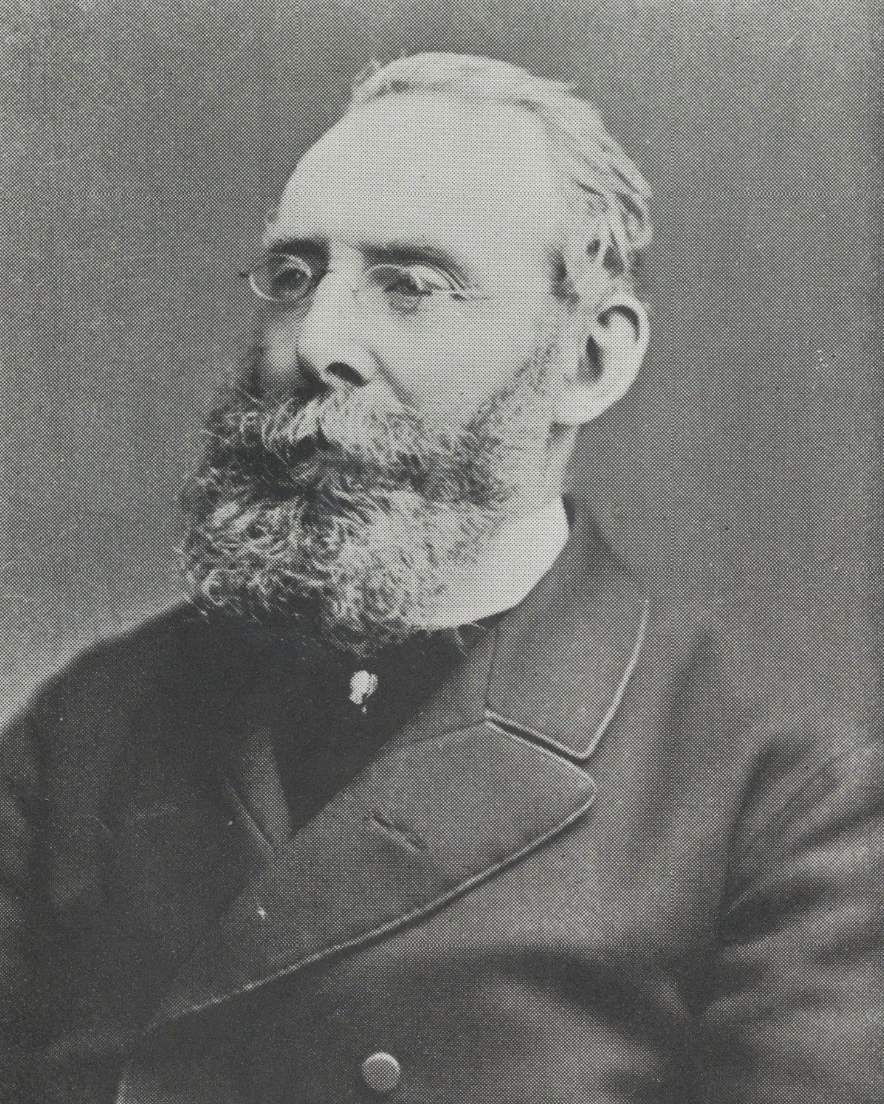
- Steer in 1894

Member of the Newfoundland House of Assembly for Trinity Bay
- In office November 8, 1873 – November 9, 1878 Serving with John H. Warren (1873–1874); William Whiteway (1874–1878); James H. Watson (1874–1878)
- Preceded by: Alexander Graham; Stephen Rendell
- Succeeded by: John Rendell

Personal details
- Born: October 9, 1824 Torquay, Devon, England, U.K.
- Died: October 26, 1918 (aged 94) St. John's, Newfoundland
- Party: Conservative
- Spouse: Amelia Ayre (m. 1851)
- Children: 2 (Charles and Francis)
- Relatives: Charles R. Ayre (brother-in-law)
- Occupation: Merchant

John Steer (October 9, 1824 – October 26, 1918) was an English-born merchant and politician in Newfoundland. As a Conservative supporter of Premier Frederick Carter, he represented Trinity Bay in the Newfoundland House of Assembly from 1873 to 1878.

== Business career and politics ==
Steer was born in Torquay, Devon and came to Newfoundland in 1827. He first worked as a dry goods clerk for the mercantile firm Job Brothers. Steer married Amelia, the sister of Charles R. Ayre. He worked in partnership with his brother-in-law from 1844 to 1858 before opening his own dry goods store called John Steer Ltd. Steer served in the House of Assembly for several years as a Conservative supporter of Premier Frederick Carter. His two sons, Charles Robert Steer and Francis Henry Steer, would eventually operate the family business alongside him.

Steer died in St. John's on October 26, 1918. His son Francis would later serve in the Legislative Council of Newfoundland.
