= Lewis Tessier =

Newfoundland politician (1820–1884)

Lewis Tessier MHA

Member of the Newfoundland House of Assembly for St. John's West
- In office March 31, 1870 – November 6, 1882 Serving with Peter Brennan (1870–1873); Thomas Talbot (1870–1871); Maurice Fenelon (1871–1878); Patrick J. Scott (1872–1882)
- Preceded by: Henry Renouf
- Succeeded by: James J. Callanan; Philip D. White

Personal details
- Born: c. 1820 Newton Abbot, Devon, England
- Died: April 30, 1884 (aged 63–64) St. John's, Newfoundland Colony
- Party: Anti-Confederation (1870–1874); Liberal (1874–1882)
- Relatives: Peter G. Tessier (brother); James C. Tessier (nephew)
- Occupation: Merchant

Lewis Tessier (c. 1820 – April 30, 1884) was an English-born merchant and political figure in Newfoundland. He represented St. John's West in the Newfoundland and Labrador House of Assembly from 1870 to 1882 as a Liberal.

He was born in Newton Abbot, Devon, and came to Newfoundland with his brother Peter G. Tessier in 1835. The brothers established the mercantile company P. & L. Tessier in 1847. By the 1870s, the firm had become one of the largest fishing supply and fish export businesses in Newfoundland. Tessier was opposed to union with Canada. He died in St. John's in 1884.

His former residence in St. John's is now the home of the Heritage Foundation of Newfoundland and Labrador.

== See also ==
- List of Newfoundland and Labrador by-elections
