= Daylight Saving Act of 1917 =

Canadian time zone law

The Daylight Saving Act of 1917 was enacted by the Dominion of Newfoundland to adopt daylight saving time (DST), thus making it one of the first jurisdictions in North America to do so, only a year after the United Kingdom on May 21, 1916.

== History ==
While living in Paris in 1784, Benjamin Franklin wrote a satirical essay, in which he suggested that Parisians get up earlier in the morning. Modern DST was first proposed by the New Zealand entomologist George Vernon Hudson in 1895. William Willett, a London building contractor, independently invented DST and pitched it to the British Parliament in 1907. In that same year Willett spoke with John Anderson, who was on a business trip in Britain, and explained to him the benefits of adopting DST and its economic benefits. Germany and its allies were the first European countries to adopt DST in 1916, followed quickly by the United Kingdom and many other western European countries, all in an effort to save fuel during the First World War.

Upon his return to Newfoundland, Anderson became a strong proponent of daylight saving time and three times introduced a bill to the Legislative Council for its adoption. The first two attempts, in 1909 and 1910, failed. In 1917, spurred on perhaps by the recent adoptions of DST in Europe, Anderson introduced a third bill which passed on June 17, 1917. The new law stated that at nine o'clock in the evening of the second Sunday in June clocks would be put ahead to ten o'clock and would not be turned back until the last Sunday in September. It is not clear exactly when clocks were put ahead in 1917, as the bill became law one week after DST was scheduled to take effect. In St. John's DST was first applied on April 8, 1917, by virtue of a local ordinance. DST in Newfoundland came to be known as "Anderson’s Time", at least in the years immediately following its adoption.

Daylight-saving time remained a provincial jurisdiction in Newfoundland since 1949. In 1952, the timing was changed such that it began just after midnight of the last Sunday in April and ended at midnight of the last Sunday in September. In 1970, it was extended to the midnight of the last Sunday in October.
