= Patrick J. Scott =

Newfoundland politician (1848–1899)

The Honourable Patrick J. Scott KC

Receiver General
- In office 1895–1897
- Premier: William Whiteway
- Preceded by: William J. S. Donnelly
- Succeeded by: Alan Goodridge (as Minister of Finance and Customs)

Member of the Newfoundland House of Assembly for St. John's West
- In office November 10, 1894 – October 28, 1897 Serving with Thomas Jackman (1894–1897); George Tessier (1894–1895); Edward Morris (1895–1897)
- Preceded by: Martin W. Furlong; Edward Morris; James C. Tessier
- Succeeded by: James J. Callanan; James C. Tessier
- In office November 8, 1873 – November 6, 1889 Serving with Maurice Fenelon (1873–1878); Lewis Tessier (1873–1882); James J. Callanan (1882–1889); Philip D. White (1882–1885); Edward Morris (1885–1889)
- Preceded by: Peter Brennan
- Succeeded by: James Day; Lawrence Gearin

Personal details
- Born: December 25, 1848 St. John's, Newfoundland Colony
- Died: October 22, 1899 (aged 50) St. John's, Newfoundland Colony
- Party: Anti-Confederation (1873–1874); Liberal (1874–1878, 1894–1897); Conservative (1882–1885); Reform (1885–1889)
- Spouse: Eleanor Margaret Little (m. 1882)
- Relatives: Joseph Little (brother-in-law); Philip Little (brother-in-law)
- Education: Saint Bonaventure's College
- Occupation: Lawyer

Patrick J. Scott (December 25, 1848 – October 22, 1899) was a lawyer and political figure in Newfoundland. He represented St. John's West in the Newfoundland and Labrador House of Assembly from 1873 to 1882, from 1885 to 1889 and from 1894 to 1897.

He was born in St. John's and educated at Saint Bonaventure's College. He studied law with George James Hogsett and John Little and was admitted to the Newfoundland bar in 1874. Scott married Eleanor Margaret Little, the sister of Joseph Ignatius Little, in 1882. He was defeated when he ran for reelection in 1889 and in 1893 and in an 1890 by-election in St. John's East. He was elected again in an 1894 by-election held after several Liberals elected in 1893 were forced to resign. Scott was named to the Executive Council as receiver general in 1894. He was defeated when he chose to run in Placentia and St. Mary's in the 1897 general election. He died in St. John's of heart failure at the age of 50.
