= Lawrence Gearin =

Canadian politician

Lawrence J. Gearin (died February 4, 1900, at age 64) was a merchant and politician in Newfoundland. He represented St. John's West in the Newfoundland House of Assembly from 1889 to 1893 as a Liberal. His surname also appears as Geran.

The son of a sealing captain, Gearin was born in St. John's. He was a grocer and president of the St. John's Steam Laundry Company. He was also a founding member of the local St. Vincent de Paul Society. Gearin ran unsuccessfully for St. John's municipal council in 1888. He was elected to the Newfoundland assembly in 1889 and did not run for reelection in 1893. He died in St. John's.
