= Robert Alexander (Newfoundland politician) =

Canadian politician

Robert Alexander (1822 – January 1884) was a merchant and politician in Newfoundland. He represented Fortune Bay in the Newfoundland and Labrador House of Assembly from 1874 to 1878 as a Conservative.

He was born in Newfoundland, the son of William Alexander and Elizabeth Newell. In 1861, he became managing partner in St. John's for a Scottish mercantile firm, J. and W. Stewart and Company. Alexander was a member of the local Chamber of Commerce from 1864 to 1876 and a director for the Union Bank of Newfoundland from 1863 to 1876. He died in Liverpool, England during a visit to attempt to improve his health.
