= 1932 Newfoundland general election =

Election in the Dominion of Newfoundland

- June 11, 1932

27 seats of the Newfoundland House of Assembly 14 seats needed for a majority
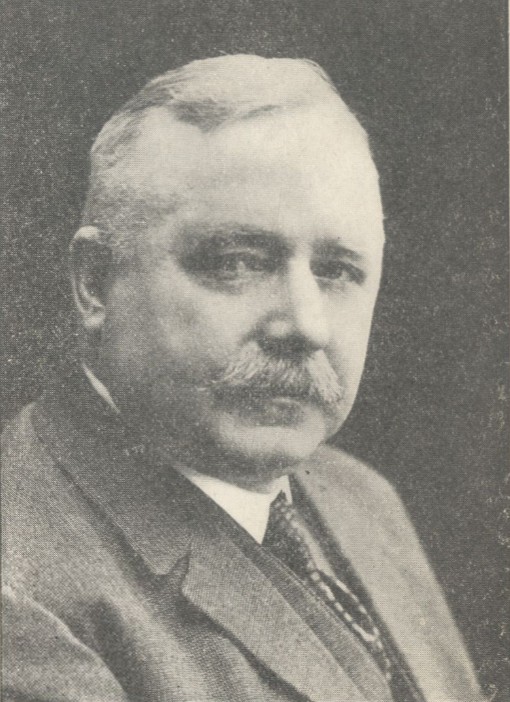

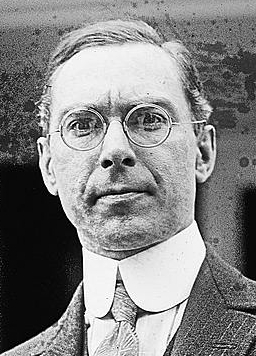
	First party	Second party
Leader	Frederick C. Alderdice	Richard Squires
Party	United Newfoundland	Liberal
Leader since	1932	1928
Leader's seat	St. John's West (Note: Not the incumbent, but ran in this seat and won)	Humber; Ran in Trinity South (lost)
Last election	12 seats, 42.85% (Note: As the Liberal-Conservative-Progressive Party)	28 seats, 54.98% (Note: As a coalition government with the Fishermen's Protective Union)
Seats won	24	2
Seat change	▲12	▼26
Popular vote	82,037	32,726
Percentage	70.85%	28.26%
Swing	▲28.00%	▼26.72%
- Results by district
Prime Minister before election
Richard Squires
Liberal
Prime Minister after election
Frederick C. Alderdice
United Newfoundland

The 1932 Newfoundland general election was held on June 11, 1932 to elect members of the 28th General Assembly of Newfoundland. It was the final legislative general election held in the Dominion of Newfoundland.

As a result of a riot which occurred in 1932 due to Newfoundland's deteriorating economic situation, Prime Minister Sir Richard Squires dissolved the House of Assembly and called an election. His Liberals were reduced to two seats while Frederick C. Alderdice's United Newfoundland Party won 24 seats and was elected to government. The size of the House was reduced from 40 to 27 as an economic measure.

Alderdice was not able to rescue the public finances. By this time, Newfoundlanders despaired of the ability of their politicians to solve their problems. The British government commissioned a report from William Warrender Mackenzie, 1st Baron Amulree which was scathing about the political culture of Newfoundland.

The price of British government financial aid was the abandonment of responsible and representative government. The legislature was dissolved. The Commission of Government came into operation on February 16, 1934, ending more than a century of legislative democracy in Newfoundland.

== Results ==
Party	Leader	1928	Candidates	Seats won	Change in seats	% of seats (% change)	Popular vote	% of vote (% change)
United Newfoundland	Frederick C. Alderdice	12	26	24	▲12	88.89% (▲58.89%)	82,037	70.85% (▲28.00%)
Liberal	Richard Squires	28	26	2	▼26	7.41% (▼62.59%)	32,726	28.26% (▼26.72%)
Other		0	3	1	▲1	3.70% (▲3.70%)	1,034	0.90% (▼1.27%)
Totals		40	55	27	▼13	100%	115,797	100%

== Results by district ==
- Names in **boldface type** represent party leaders.
- † indicates that the incumbent did not run again.
- ‡ indicates that the incumbent ran in a different district.

=== St. John's ===
Electoral district	Candidates			Incumbent
Electoral district	Liberal (historical)	United (historical)	Other	Incumbent
St. John's East	Leo Murphy; 1,390; 8.32%	Gerald Byrne; 6,987; 41.83%		**Frederick C. Alderdice**‡ St. John's City East (ran in St. John's West)
St. John's East	Leo Murphy; 1,390; 8.32%	Gerald Byrne; 6,987; 41.83%		Gerald Byrne; St. John's City East
St. John's East	Thomas J. Mahoney; 1,356; 8.12%	Edward Emerson; 6,969; 41.73%		Merged district
St. John's East	Thomas J. Mahoney; 1,356; 8.12%	Edward Emerson; 6,969; 41.73%		John Tobin†; St. John's East Extern
St. John's West	Kenneth Ruby; 2,884; 14.05%	**Frederick C. Alderdice**; 7,554; 36.81%	George Ayre (Independent); 214; 1.04%	Alexander Campbell‡ St. John's City West (ran in St. George's-Port au Port)
St. John's West	Kenneth Ruby; 2,884; 14.05%	**Frederick C. Alderdice**; 7,554; 36.81%	George Ayre (Independent); 214; 1.04%	Joseph Fitzgibbon‡ St. John's City West (ran in Placentia and St. Mary's)
St. John's West	James Power; 2,548; 12.42%	Patrick Halley; 7,320; 35.67%		Merged district
St. John's West	James Power; 2,548; 12.42%	Patrick Halley; 7,320; 35.67%		Frank Bennett†; St. John's West Extern

=== Conception Bay ===
Electoral district	Candidates		Incumbent
Electoral district	Liberal (historical)	United (historical)	Incumbent
Carbonear-Bay de Verde	Richard Cramm; 1,955; 37.03%	John Puddester; 3,325; 62.97%	James Moore†; Carbonear
Carbonear-Bay de Verde	Richard Cramm; 1,955; 37.03%	John Puddester; 3,325; 62.97%	Merged district
Carbonear-Bay de Verde	Richard Cramm; 1,955; 37.03%	John Puddester; 3,325; 62.97%	John Puddester; Bay de Verde
Harbour Grace	Frank Archibald; 620; 20.98%	Harry Winter; 2,335; 79.02%	Frank Archibald
Harbour Main-Bell Island	Albert Walsh; 1,938; 18.18%	Charles Furey; 3,480; 32.65%	Philip Lewis‡ Harbour Main (ran in Placentia and St. Mary's)
Harbour Main-Bell Island	Albert Walsh; 1,938; 18.18%	Charles Furey; 3,480; 32.65%	Albert Walsh; Harbour Main
Harbour Main-Bell Island	Joseph Greene; 1,872; 17.56%	William Browne; 3,370; 31.61%	Merged district
Harbour Main-Bell Island	Joseph Greene; 1,872; 17.56%	William Browne; 3,370; 31.61%	Joseph Greene; Bell Island
Port de Grave	Robert Smith; 1,074; 32.87%	James Ayre; 2,193; 67.13%	John Parsons†; Bay Roberts
Port de Grave	Robert Smith; 1,074; 32.87%	James Ayre; 2,193; 67.13%	Merged district
Port de Grave	Robert Smith; 1,074; 32.87%	James Ayre; 2,193; 67.13%	Robert Smith; Port de Grave

=== Avalon and Burin Peninsulas ===
Electoral district	Candidates		Incumbent
Electoral district	Liberal (historical)	United (historical)	Incumbent
Burin	H. B. C. Lake; 1,383; 36.63%	Samuel Foote; 2,393; 63.37%	James Winter†; Burin East
Burin	H. B. C. Lake; 1,383; 36.63%	Samuel Foote; 2,393; 63.37%	Merged district
Burin	H. B. C. Lake; 1,383; 36.63%	Samuel Foote; 2,393; 63.37%	H. B. C. Lake; Burin West
Ferryland	W. Loyola Whelan; 395; 14.07%	Michael Shea; 2,412; 85.93%	Peter Cashin†
Placentia and St. Mary's	Joseph Fitzgibbon; 472; 15.92%	Philip Lewis; 2,492; 84.08%	Edward Emerson‡ Placentia East (ran in St. John's East)
Placentia and St. Mary's	Joseph Fitzgibbon; 472; 15.92%	Philip Lewis; 2,492; 84.08%	Merged district
Placentia and St. Mary's	Joseph Fitzgibbon; 472; 15.92%	Philip Lewis; 2,492; 84.08%	James Bindon†; St. Mary's
Placentia West	J. J. St. John; 613; 21.06%	William Walsh; 2,298; 78.94%	Leo Murphy‡ (ran in St. John's East)
Trinity South	**Richard Squires**; 1,686; 41.62%	Harold Mitchell; 2,365; 58.38%	Edwin Godden‡ (ran in Fogo)

=== Eastern and Central Newfoundland ===
Electoral district	Candidates			Incumbent
Electoral district	Liberal (historical)	United (historical)	Other	Incumbent
Bonavista North	Joseph Davis; 1,020; 26.32%	William C. Winsor; 2,856; 73.68%		J. H. Scammell†; Bonavista Centre
Bonavista North	Joseph Davis; 1,020; 26.32%	William C. Winsor; 2,856; 73.68%		Merged district
Bonavista North	Joseph Davis; 1,020; 26.32%	William C. Winsor; 2,856; 73.68%		Nathan Winsor†; Bonavista North
Bonavista South	Joey Smallwood; 812; 18.71%	Herman Quinton; 3,528; 81.29%		William Coaker†; Bonavista East
Bonavista South	Joey Smallwood; 812; 18.71%	Herman Quinton; 3,528; 81.29%		Merged district
Bonavista South	Joey Smallwood; 812; 18.71%	Herman Quinton; 3,528; 81.29%		Herman Quinton; Bonavista South
Fogo	Edwin Godden; 734; 23.44%	Harold Earle; 2,397; 76.56%		Richard Hibbs†
Grand Falls	William Earle; 1,420; 33.66%	Kenneth Brown; 2,799; 66.34%		William Earle
Grand Falls	William Earle; 1,420; 33.66%	Kenneth Brown; 2,799; 66.34%		Merged district
Grand Falls	William Earle; 1,420; 33.66%	Kenneth Brown; 2,799; 66.34%		Helena Squires‡ Lewisporte (ran in Twillingate)
Green Bay	Roland Starkes; 1,271; 54.13%	Frederick Wells; 1,077; 45.87%		Roland Starkes
Trinity North	Bert King; 726; 16.37%	John Stone; 2,888; 65.13%	Reuben Vardy (Independent); 820; 18.49%	F. Gordon Bradley‡ Trinity Centre (ran in Humber)
Trinity North	Bert King; 726; 16.37%	John Stone; 2,888; 65.13%	Reuben Vardy (Independent); 820; 18.49%	Merged district
Trinity North	Bert King; 726; 16.37%	John Stone; 2,888; 65.13%	Reuben Vardy (Independent); 820; 18.49%	William Halfyard†; Trinity North
Twillingate	Helena Squires; 1,206; 44.92%	Norman Gray; 1,479; 55.08%		Kenneth Brown‡ (ran in Grand Falls)

=== Southern and Western Newfoundland ===
Electoral district	Candidates			Incumbent
Electoral district	Liberal (historical)	United (historical)	Other	Incumbent
Burgeo and La Poile	Philip Butler; 585; 23.71%	James Winter; 1,882; 76.29%		Arthur Barnes†; Burgeo
Fortune Bay and Hermitage			Harris Mosdell (Independent); Won by acclamation	Harris Mosdell; Fortune Bay
Fortune Bay and Hermitage			Harris Mosdell (Independent); Won by acclamation	Merged district
Fortune Bay and Hermitage			Harris Mosdell (Independent); Won by acclamation	Philip Fudge†; Hermitage
Humber	F. Gordon Bradley; 2,612; 54.01%	S. D. Cook; 2,224; 45.99%		**Richard Squires**‡ (ran in Trinity South)
St. Barbe	Edward Spencer; 572; 31.33%	George Whitely; 1,254; 68.67%		Walter Skanes†
St. George's-Port au Port	Alexander Campbell; 768; 22.89%	William Abbott; 2,587; 77.11%		Joseph Downey†; St. George's
St. George's-Port au Port	Alexander Campbell; 768; 22.89%	William Abbott; 2,587; 77.11%		Merged district
St. George's-Port au Port	Alexander Campbell; 768; 22.89%	William Abbott; 2,587; 77.11%		William Abbott; Port au Port
White Bay	Joseph Strong; 814; 34.10%	Joseph Moore; 1,573; 65.90%		Joseph Strong
