= 27th General Assembly of Newfoundland =

Dominion of Newfoundland legislature

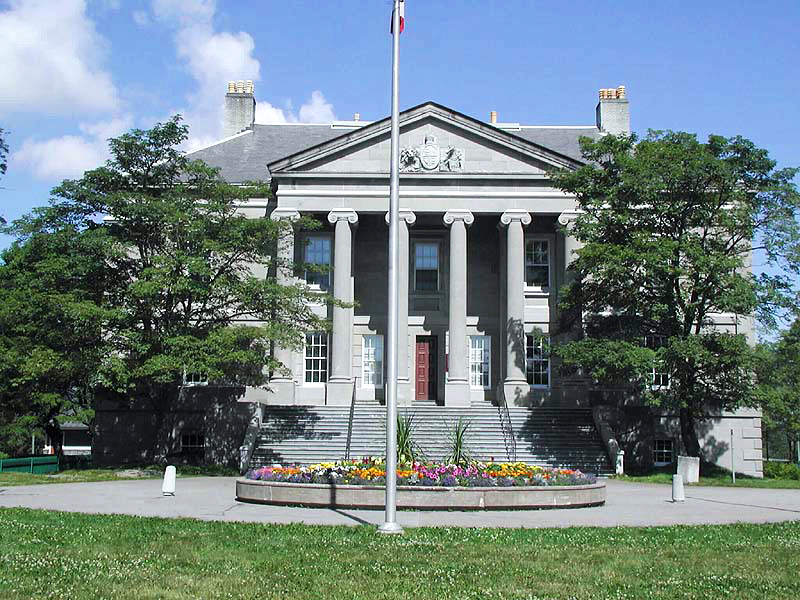
- Colonial Building seat of the Newfoundland government and the House of Assembly from January 28, 1850, to July 28, 1959.

History
- Founded: 1928
- Disbanded: 1932
- Preceded by: 26th General Assembly of Newfoundland
- Succeeded by: 28th General Assembly of Newfoundland

Leadership
- Premier: Richard Squires

Elections
- Last election: 1928 Newfoundland general election

The members of the 27th General Assembly of Newfoundland were elected in the Newfoundland general election held in June 1928. The general assembly sat from 1928 to 1932.

The Liberal Party led by Richard Squires formed the government in partnership with members of the Fishermen's Protective Union.

Albert J. Walsh served as speaker.

Sir John Middleton served as governor of Newfoundland.

== Members of the Assembly ==
The following members were elected to the assembly in 1928:

Member	Electoral district	Affiliation	First elected / previously elected
John C. Puddester	Bay de Verde	Conservative	1924
John Parsons	Bay Roberts	Liberal	1928
J. M. Greene	Bell Island	Liberal	1928
J. H. Scammell	Bonavista Centre	Liberal	1919
William F. Coaker	Bonavista East	Liberal	1913, 1928
Robert G. Winsor	Bonavista North	Liberal	1904, 1924
Nathan G. Winsor (1930)	Bonavista North	Liberal	1930
Herman W. Quinton	Bonavista South	Conservative	1928
Walter M. Chambers	Burgeo	Conservative	1924
Arthur Barnes (1928)	Burgeo	Liberal	1904, 1919, 1928
James A. Winter	Burin East	Conservative	1928
H. B. C. Lake	Burin West	Liberal	1924
James Moore	Carbonear	Conservative	1923, 1928
Peter J. Cashin	Ferryland	Liberal	1923
Richard Hibbs	Fogo	Liberal	1924
Harris M. Mosdell	Fortune Bay	Liberal	1926
William Earle	Grand Falls	Liberal	1928
Roland G. Starkes	Green Bay	Liberal	1928
Frank C. Archibald	Harbour Grace	Liberal	1919, 1928
Philip J. Lewis	Harbour Main	Liberal	1928
Albert J. Walsh	Harbour Main	Liberal	1928
Philip Fudge	Hermitage	Liberal	1928
Richard A. Squires	Humber	Liberal	1909, 1919, 1928
George F. Grimes	Lewisporte	Liberal	1924
Helena Squires (1930)	Lewisporte	Liberal	1930
L. Edward Emerson	Placentia East	Conservative	1928
Michael S. Sullivan	Placentia West	Conservative	1923
Leo J. Murphy (1930)	Placentia West	Liberal	1930
William H. Abbott	Port au Port	Conservative	1928
R. J. Smith	Port de Grave	Liberal	1928
W. R. Skanes	St. Barbe	Liberal	1928
Joseph F. Downey	St. George's	Liberal	1908, 1923, 1928
Frederick C. Alderdice	St. John's City East	Conservative	1928
Gerald G. Byrne	St. John's City East	Conservative	1928
Alexander Campbell	St. John's City West	Liberal	1928
J. M. Fitzgibbon	St. John's City West	Liberal	1928
John M. Tobin	St. John's East Extern	Conservative	1928
Frank Bennett	St. John's West Extern	Conservative	1928
James J. Bindon	St. Mary's	Liberal	1928
F. Gordon Bradley	Trinity Centre	Liberal	1924 (Note: First Elected as a Liberal-Conservative)
William W. Halfyard	Trinity North	Liberal	1913
Edwin J. Godden	Trinity South	Liberal	1924
Kenneth M. Brown	Twillingate	Liberal	1923
J. A. Strong	White Bay	Liberal	1928

== By-elections ==
By-elections were held to replace members for various reasons:

Electoral district	Member elected	Affiliation	Election date	Reason
Burgeo	Arthur Barnes (Note: Elected by acclamation)	Liberal	1928	W M Chambers resigned for health reasons
Bonavista North	Nathan G. Winsor	Liberal	May 17, 1930	R G Winsor died June 1, 1929
Lewisporte	Helena E. Squires (Note: First woman elected to Newfoundland assembly)	Liberal	May 17, 1930	G F Grimes died August 10, 1929
Placentia West	Leo J. Murphy	Liberal	May 17, 1930	M S Sullivan died 1929
