= 1928 Newfoundland general election =

Election in the Dominion of Newfoundland

- October 29, 1928

40 seats of the Newfoundland House of Assembly 21 seats needed for a majority
- Turnout: 75.62% (▲8.34pp)
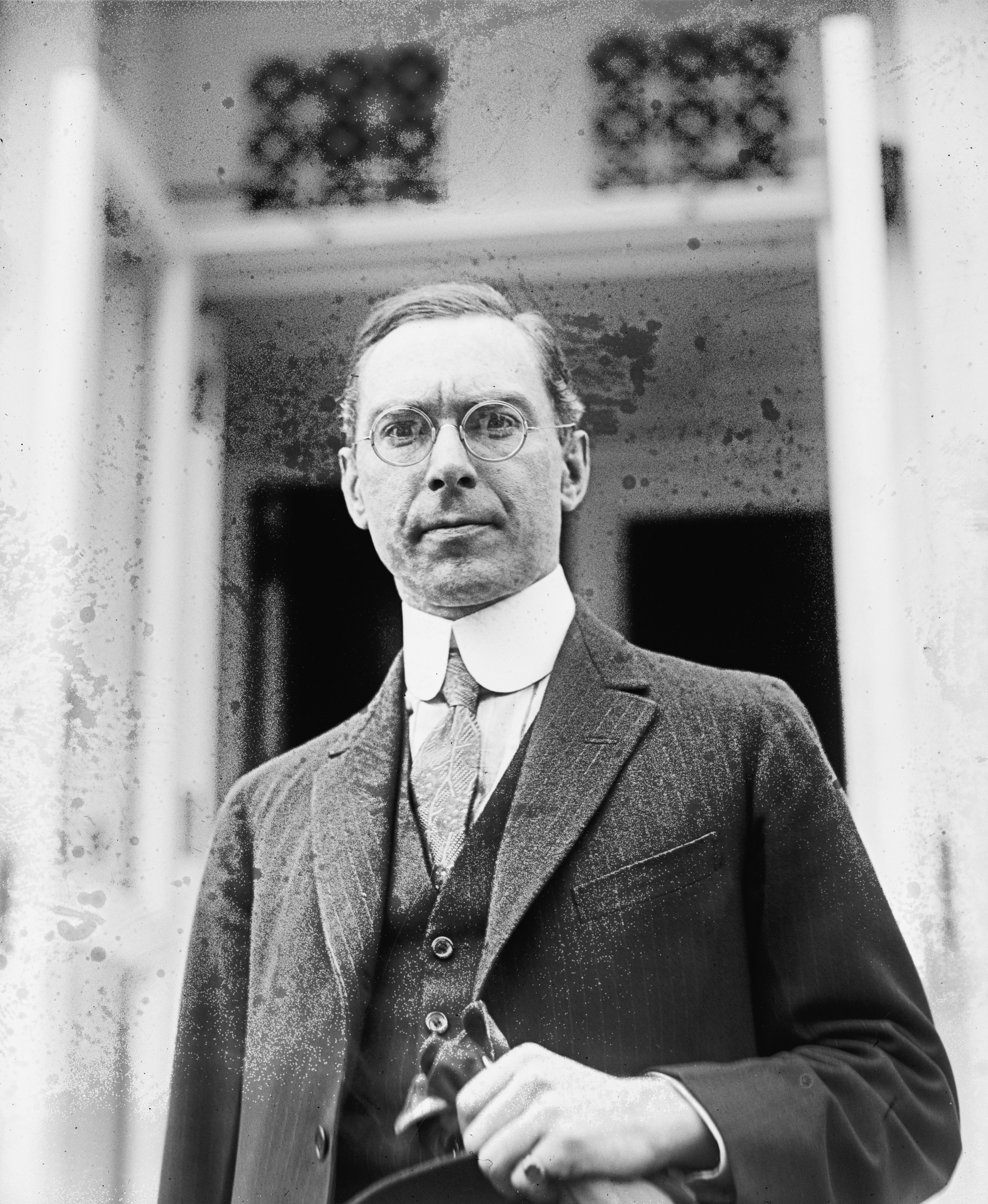

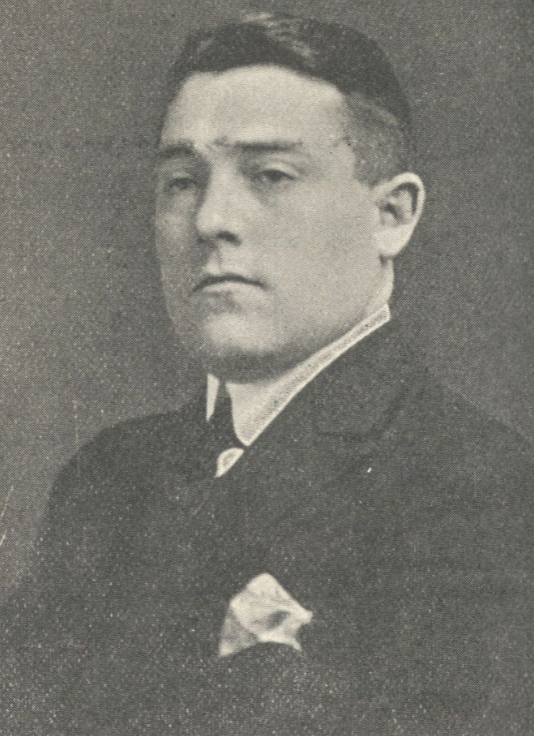

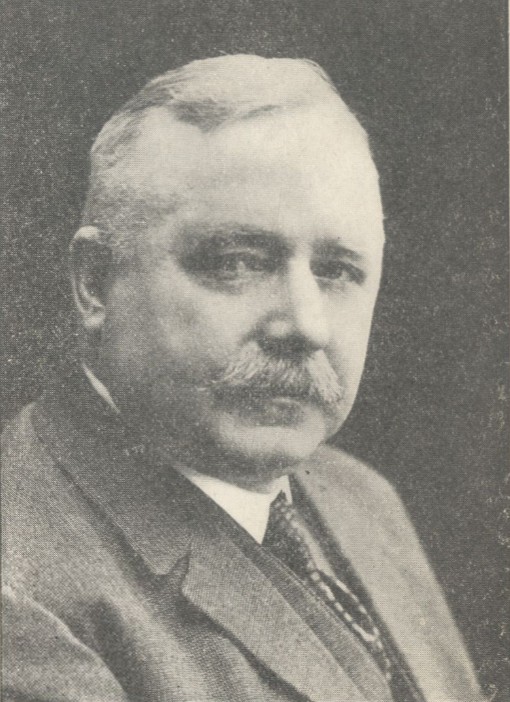
	First party	Second party
Leader	Richard Squires and J. H. Scammell	Frederick C. Alderdice
Party	Liberal	Liberal-Conservative Progressive
Leader since	1928 / 1926	1928
Leader's seat	Humber / Bonavista Centre (Note: Not the incumbent, but stood in this district and won)	St. John's City East
Last election	10 seats, 40.88% (Note: As the Liberal-Progressive Party)	25 seats, 57.94%
Seats won	28	12
Seat change	▲18	▼13
Popular vote	58,750	45,787
Percentage	54.98%	42.85%
Swing	▲14.10%	▼15.09%
- Results by district
Prime Minister before election
Frederick C. Alderdice (Note: On August 15, 1928, Walter Stanley Monroe resigned from the premiership, and was replaced by his cousin and Member of the Legislative Council, Frederick C. Alderdice.)
Liberal-Conservative Progressive
Prime Minister after election
Richard Squires
Liberal

The 1928 Newfoundland general election was held on October 29, 1928 to elect members of the 27th General Assembly of Newfoundland in the Dominion of Newfoundland. The Liberal Party led by Richard Squires defeated the Conservative Party led by Frederick C. Alderdice and formed the government with the support of Fishermen's Protective Union members. Legislation had been introduced so that persons named to the Executive Council were no longer required to run for reelection.

In April 1925, women over the age of 25 had been granted the right to vote; in the 1928 general election, 90 per cent of women eligible to vote cast a ballot. Helena Squires became the first woman elected to the Newfoundland assembly in a 1930 by-election.

== Results by party ==
Party	Leader	1924	Candidates	Seats won	Seat change	% of seats (% change)	Popular vote	% of vote (% change)
Liberal	Richard Squires	10	40; Liberal 26; FPU 14 (Note: In a 1932 Fishermen's Advocate article, Coaker states that the FPU fielded 14 candidates in the 1928 election, and that all of them were elected except for Samuel Brown, who was narrowly defeated in Bonavista South. However, he does not identify these candidates. The results by district table below only denotes those who had previously been elected as a member of the FPU, as well as the above-mentioned Samuel Brown.)	28	▲18	70.00% (▲42.22%)	58,750	54.98% (▲14.10%)
Fishermen's Protective Union (Note: As part of an electoral alliance with the Liberal party)	J. H. Scammell	–	40; Liberal 26; FPU 14	28	▲18	70.00% (▲42.22%)	58,750	54.98% (▲14.10%)
Liberal-Conservative Progressive	Frederick C. Alderdice	25	40	12	▼13	30.00% (▼39.44%)	45,787	42.85% (▼15.09%)
Other		1	8	0	▼1	0.00% (▼2.50%)	2,317	2.17% (▲0.99%)
Totals		36	88	40	▲4	100%	106,854 (Note: This figure includes votes cast for more than one candidate in multi-member districts. A total of 89,689 individual votes were cast in this election.)	100%

== Results by district ==
- Names in **boldface type** represent party leaders.
- † indicates that the incumbent did not run again.
- ‡ indicates that the incumbent ran in a different district.

=== St. John's ===
Electoral district	Candidates			Incumbent
Electoral district	Liberal-Conservative	Liberal (historical)	Other	Incumbent
St. John's City East; 84.26% turnout	**Frederick C. Alderdice**; 3,826; 28.91%	William Brophy; 2,956; 22.34%		William Higgins†; St. John's East
St. John's City East; 84.26% turnout	**Frederick C. Alderdice**; 3,826; 28.91%	William Brophy; 2,956; 22.34%		Cyril Fox†; St. John's East
St. John's City East; 84.26% turnout	Gerald G. Byrne; 3,687; 27.86%	St. Clair Churchill; 2,764; 20.89%		William Brophy; St. John's East
St. John's East Extern; 80.01% turnout	John Tobin; 1,256; 57.43%	Thomas S. Devine; 931; 42.57%		New district
St. John's City West; 86.41% turnout	William Howley; 3,373; 21.73%	Alexander Campbell; 4,352; 28.04%	J. Sinclair Tait (Independent); 296; 1.91%	John Crosbie†; St. John's West
St. John's City West; 86.41% turnout	William Howley; 3,373; 21.73%	Alexander Campbell; 4,352; 28.04%	J. Sinclair Tait (Independent); 296; 1.91%	William Browne; St. John's West
St. John's City West; 86.41% turnout	William Browne; 3,333; 21.47%	Joseph Fitzgibbon; 4,169; 26.86%	J. Sinclair Tait (Independent); 296; 1.91%	William Linegar†; St. John's West
St. John's West Extern; 90.00% turnout	Frank Bennett; 1,317; 51.53%	Kenneth Ruby; 1,239; 48.47%		New district

=== Conception Bay ===
Electoral district	Candidates			Incumbent
Electoral district	Liberal-Conservative	Liberal (historical)	Other	Incumbent
Bay de Verde; 82.07% turnout	John Puddester; 1,638; 59.46%	William H. Cave; 1,117; 40.54%		Richard Cramm (ran in Carbonear)
Bay de Verde; 82.07% turnout	John Puddester; 1,638; 59.46%	William H. Cave; 1,117; 40.54%		John Puddester
Bay Roberts; 67.71% turnout	Augustus Calpin; 608; 33.76%	John Parsons; 1,193; 66.24%		New district
Bell Island; 88.22% turnout	Richard A. Howley; 582; 34.62%	Joseph Greene; 1,099; 65.38%		New district
Carbonear; 73.83% turnout	James Moore; 1,065; 45.92%	Henry Cowan; 689; 29.71%	Richard Cramm (Independent); 565; 24.36%	Robert Duff†
Harbour Grace; 80.56% turnout	Edward Oke; 388; 19.72%	Frank Archibald; 1,440; 73.17%	Ernest Simmons (Independent); 140; 7.11%	Albert Hickman†
Harbour Grace; 80.56% turnout	Edward Oke; 388; 19.72%	Frank Archibald; 1,440; 73.17%	Ernest Simmons (Independent); 140; 7.11%	John R. Bennett†
Harbour Grace; 80.56% turnout	Edward Oke; 388; 19.72%	Frank Archibald; 1,440; 73.17%	Ernest Simmons (Independent); 140; 7.11%	Charles Russell†
Harbour Main; 70.35% turnout	Charles Furey; 1,468; 24.70%	Philip Lewis; 1,532; 25.78%		William Woodford†
Harbour Main; 70.35% turnout	William Walsh; 1,463; 24.62%	Albert Walsh; 1,480; 24.90%		Cyril Cahill‡ (ran in Placentia East)
Port de Grave; 72.97% turnout	Henry Burt; 331; 15.00%	Robert Smith; 1,349; 61.15%	Joseph Cantwell (Independent); 526; 23.84%	F. Gordon Bradley‡ (ran in Trinity Centre)

=== Avalon Peninsula ===
Electoral district	Candidates			Incumbent
Electoral district	Liberal-Conservative	Liberal (historical)	Other	Incumbent
Ferryland; 90.83% turnout	Michael Shea; 1,146; 48.01%	Peter Cashin; 1,241; 51.99%		Peter Cashin
Ferryland; 90.83% turnout	Michael Shea; 1,146; 48.01%	Peter Cashin; 1,241; 51.99%		Philip Moore†
Placentia East; 82.59% turnout	Edward Emerson; 753; 43.00%	Cyril Cahill; 733; 41.86%	Thomas F. McGrath (Independent); 265; 15.13%	Michael Sullivan‡ Placentia and St. Mary's (ran in Placentia West)
Placentia East; 82.59% turnout	Edward Emerson; 753; 43.00%	Cyril Cahill; 733; 41.86%	Thomas F. McGrath (Independent); 265; 15.13%	William Walsh‡ Placentia and St. Mary's (ran in Harbour Main)
Placentia East; 82.59% turnout	Edward Emerson; 753; 43.00%	Cyril Cahill; 733; 41.86%	Thomas F. McGrath (Independent); 265; 15.13%	Edward Sinnott†; Placentia and St. Mary's
St. Mary's; 84.37% turnout	Charles J. Ellis; 713; 41.67%	James Bindon; 966; 56.46%	Michael Condon (Independent); 32; 1.87%	New district
Trinity South; 72.57% turnout	Harold Mitchell; 962; 43.02%	Edwin Godden; 1,274; 56.98%		Edwin Godden; Trinity Bay

=== Eastern Newfoundland ===
Electoral district	Candidates		Incumbent
Electoral district	Liberal-Conservative	FPU	Incumbent
Bonavista Centre; 64.70% turnout	Walter Monroe; 839; 39.06%	J. H. Scammell; 1,309; 60.94%	Walter Monroe; Bonavista Bay
Bonavista East; 69.88% turnout	Frederick House; 784; 27.36%	William Coaker; 2,081; 72.64%	Lewis Little†; Bonavista Bay
Bonavista North; 76.88% turnout	William C. Winsor; 1,149; 42.00%	Robert G. Winsor; 1,587; 58.00%	William C. Winsor; Bonavista Bay
Bonavista South; 68.67% turnout	Herman Quinton; 973; 51.98%	Samuel Brown; 899; 48.02%	New district
Trinity Centre; 70.27% turnout	Wallace Goobie; 609; 30.16%	F. Gordon Bradley (Liberal); 1,410; 69.84%	Isaac Randell†; Trinity Bay
Trinity North; 66.62% turnout	John G. Stone; 846; 46.43%	William Halfyard; 976; 53.57%	William Halfyard; Trinity Bay

=== Central Newfoundland ===
Electoral district	Candidates			Incumbent
Electoral district	Liberal-Conservative	FPU	Other	Incumbent
Fogo; 60.35% turnout	Robert G. Brown; 482; 23.29%	Richard Hibbs; 1,588; 76.71%		Richard Hibbs
Grand Falls; 89.18% turnout	James S. Ayre; 1,087; 37.04%	William Earle (Liberal); 1,848; 62.96%		New district
Green Bay; 64.28% turnout	Walter Milley; 389; 21.26%	Roland Starkes (Liberal); 1,357; 74.15%	Peter Parsons (Independent); 84; 4.59%	New district
Lewisporte; 55.49% turnout	William Drover; 334; 24.94%	George Grimes; 1,005; 75.06%		New district
Twillingate; 60.92% turnout	Thomas Ashbourne; 804; 46.58%	Kenneth Brown; 922; 53.42%		Kenneth Brown
Twillingate; 60.92% turnout	Thomas Ashbourne; 804; 46.58%	Kenneth Brown; 922; 53.42%		George Grimes‡ (ran in Lewisporte)
Twillingate; 60.92% turnout	Thomas Ashbourne; 804; 46.58%	Kenneth Brown; 922; 53.42%		Thomas Ashbourne

=== Southern Newfoundland ===
Electoral district	Candidates		Incumbent
Electoral district	Liberal-Conservative	Liberal (historical)	Incumbent
Burgeo; 65.93% turnout	Walter Chambers; 1,070; 52.02%	Arthur Barnes; 987; 47.98%	Walter Chambers; Burgeo and LaPoile
Burin East; 78.71% turnout	James Winter; 1,187; 50.81%	Jacob Hanham; 1,149; 49.19%	J. J. Long†; Burin
Burin West; 81.71% turnout	Samuel Foote; 1,026; 43.24%	H. B. C. Lake; 1,347; 56.76%	H. B. C. Lake; Burin
Fortune Bay; 62.27% turnout	Harry A. Winter; 928; 45.94%	Harris Mosdell; 1,092; 54.06%	Harris Mosdell
Hermitage; 66.45% turnout	Rendell Jeans; 644; 38.89%	Philip Fudge; 1,012; 61.11%	New district
Placentia West; 79.54% turnout	Michael Sullivan; 1,512; 62.95%	Thomas J. Connors; 890; 37.05%	New district

=== Western Newfoundland ===
Electoral district	Candidates			Incumbent
Electoral district	Liberal-Conservative	Liberal (historical)	Other	Incumbent
Humber; 83.52% turnout	John A. Barrett; 632; 17.35%	**Richard Squires**; 3,011; 82.65%		New district
Port au Port; 83.04% turnout	William Abbott; 623; 52.13%	John Joy; 572; 47.87%		New district
St. Barbe; 78.94% turnout	Joseph Quinton; 548; 30.65%	Walter Skanes; 1,240; 69.35%		J. H. Scammell‡ (ran in Bonavista Centre)
St. George's; 78.67% turnout	Thomas Power; 489; 29.73%	Joseph Downey; 747; 45.41%	Edwin Gillis (Independent); 409; 24.86%	Thomas Power
White Bay; 65.86% turnout	Joseph Moore; 923; 43.54%	Joseph Strong; 1,197; 56.46%		New district
