= 28th General Assembly of Newfoundland =

Dominion of Newfoundland legislature

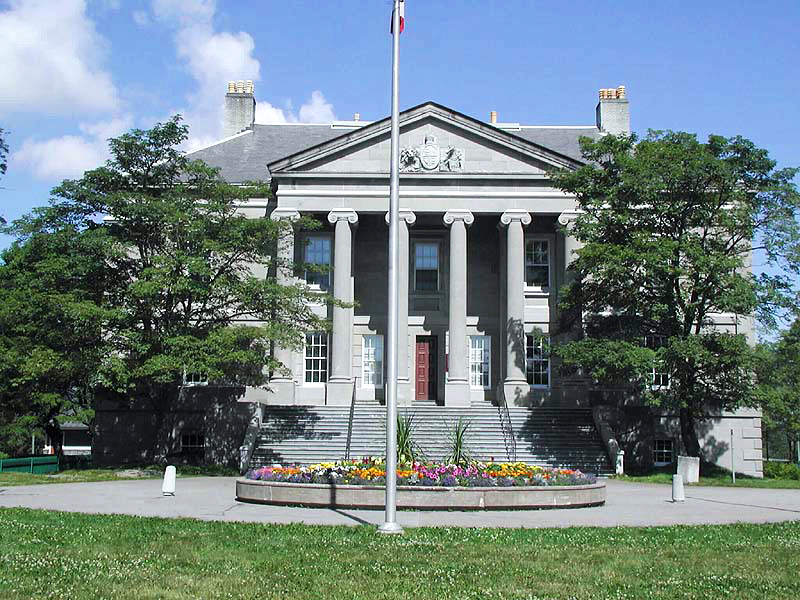
- Colonial Building seat of the Newfoundland government and the House of Assembly from January 28, 1850, to July 28, 1959.

History
- Founded: 1932
- Disbanded: 1934
- Preceded by: 27th General Assembly of Newfoundland
- Succeeded by: 29th General Assembly of Newfoundland (Commission of Government/National Convention)

Leadership
- Premier: Frederick C. Alderdice

Elections
- Last election: 1932 Newfoundland general election

The members of the 28th General Assembly of Newfoundland were elected in the Newfoundland general election held in June 1932. The general assembly sat from 1932 to 1934.

The United Newfoundland Party led by Frederick C. Alderdice formed the government.

James A. Winter served as speaker.

Sir David Murray Anderson served as governor of Newfoundland.

Overwhelmed by debt, the government proposed that it would temporarily reduce its debt payments. Instead, Canada and Britain helped make payments on its debt while a royal commission of enquiry considered Newfoundland's political future. The report, delivered in November 1933, recommended the suspension of responsible government. A Commission of Government would administer Newfoundland until its finances improved and its people wanted a return to responsible government.

== Members of the Assembly ==
The following members were elected to the assembly in 1932:

| Member | Electoral district | Affiliation | First elected / previously elected |
|---|---|---|---|
| William C. Winsor | Bonavista North | United Newfoundland Party | 1904, 1924, 1932 |
| Herman W. Quinton | Bonavista South | United Newfoundland Party | 1928 |
| James A. Winter | Burgeo | United Newfoundland Party | 1928 |
| Samuel J. Foote | Burin | United Newfoundland Party | 1919, 1932 |
| John C. Puddester | Carbonear-Bay de Verde | United Newfoundland Party | 1924 |
| Michael A. Shea | Ferryland | United Newfoundland Party | 1932 |
| Harold J. Earle | Fogo | United Newfoundland Party | 1932 |
| Harris M. Mosdell | Fortune Bay and Hermitage | Independent | 1926 |
| Kenneth M. Brown | Grand Falls | United Newfoundland Party | 1923 |
| Roland G. Starkes | Green Bay | Liberal | 1928 |
| Harry A. Winter | Harbour Grace | United Newfoundland Party | 1923, 1932 |
| Charles Furey | Harbour Main-Bell Island | United Newfoundland Party | 1932 |
| William J. Browne | Harbour Main-Bell Island | United Newfoundland Party | 1924, 1932 |
| F. Gordon Bradley | Humber | Liberal | 1924 (Note: First Elected as a Liberal-Conservative) |
| Phillip J. Lewis | Placentia and St. Mary's | United Newfoundland Party | 1928 |
| William J. Walsh | Placentia West | United Newfoundland Party | 1913, 1932 |
| James S. Ayre | Port de Grave | United Newfoundland Party | 1932 |
| George Whitely | St. Barbe | United Newfoundland Party | 1932 |
| William H. Abbott | St. George's-Port au Port | United Newfoundland Party | 1928 |
| Gerald G. Byrne | St. John's East | United Newfoundland Party | 1928 |
| L. Edward Emerson | St. John's East | United Newfoundland Party | 1928 |
| Frederick C. Alderdice | St. John's West | United Newfoundland Party | 1928 |
| Patrick F. Halley | St. John's West | United Newfoundland Party | 1932 |
| John G. Stone | Trinity North | United Newfoundland Party | 1913, 1932 |
| Harold Mitchell | Trinity South | United Newfoundland Party | 1932 |
| Norman Gray | Twillingate | United Newfoundland Party | 1932 |
| Joseph Moore | White Bay | United Newfoundland Party | 1932 |

== By-elections ==
None
