= 1924 Newfoundland general election =

Election in the Dominion of Newfoundland

- June 2, 1924

36 seats of the Newfoundland House of Assembly 19 seats needed for a majority
- Turnout: 67.28% (▼15.49pp)
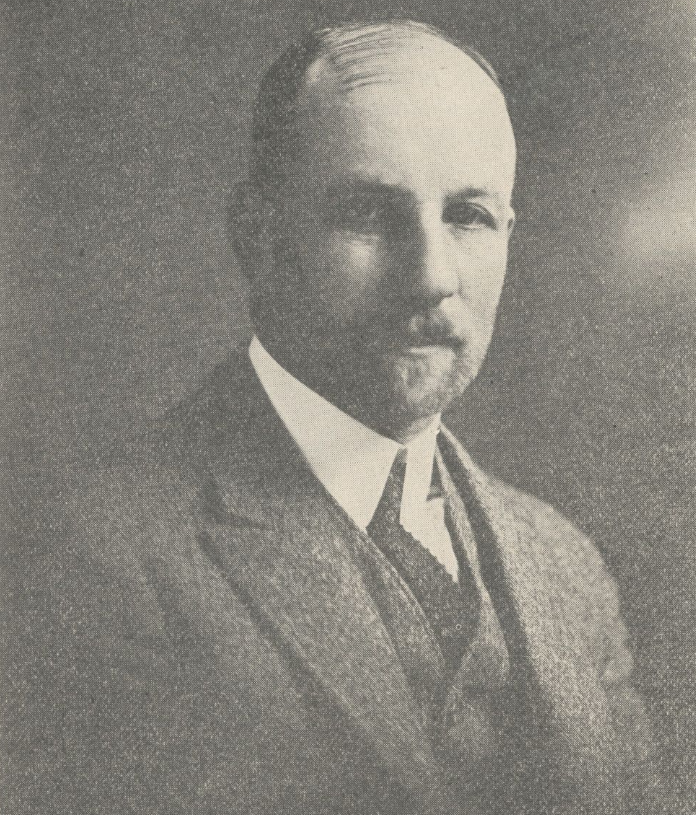

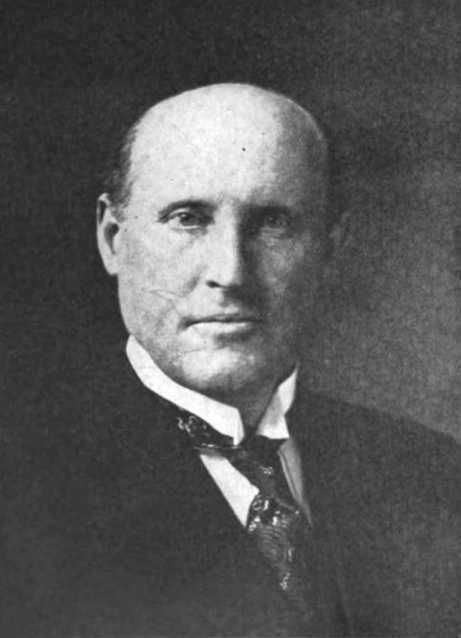
| | First party | Second party |
|---|---|---|
| Leader | Walter Monroe | Albert Hickman |
| Party | Liberal-Conservative Progressive | Liberal-Progressive |
| Leader since | 1924 | 1924 |
| Leader's seat | Bonavista Bay (Note: Not the incumbent, but stood in this district and won) | Harbour Grace |
| Last election | 13 seats, 48.01% (Note: As the Liberal-Labour-Progressive Party) | 23 seats, 51.50% (Note: As the Liberal Reform Party in a coalition with the Fishermen's Protective Union) |
| Seats won | 25 | 10 |
| Seat change | ▲12 | ▼13 |
| Popular vote | 57,391 | 40,492 |
| Percentage | 57.94% | 40.88% |
| Swing | ▲9.93% | ▼10.62% |
- Results by district
Prime Minister before election
Albert Hickman
Liberal-Progressive
Prime Minister after election
Walter Stanley Monroe
Liberal-Conservative Progressive

The 1924 Newfoundland general election was held on June 2, 1924 to elect members of the 26th General Assembly of Newfoundland in the Dominion of Newfoundland. The Liberal-Progressives and Liberal-Conservative Progressives were new parties formed as a result of the collapse of the ruling Liberal Reform Party. The Liberal-Conservative Progressives were led by Walter Stanley Monroe and won the election weeks after the party's creation. During his time in office, Monroe alienated a number of his supporters: Peter Cashin, F. Gordon Bradley, C. E. Russell, Philip F. Moore, Lewis Little and H. B. C. Lake, who all defected to the opposition Liberal-Progressive Party. In 1925, universal suffrage was introduced in Newfoundland: women aged 25 and older were allowed to vote (men could vote at the age of 21). Monroe was replaced by Frederick C. Alderdice as Prime Minister in August 1928.

== Results ==
| Party | Leader | 1923 | Candidates | Seats won | Seat change | % of seats (% change) | Popular vote | % of vote (% change) |
|---|---|---|---|---|---|---|---|---|
| Liberal-Conservative Progressive | Walter Monroe | 13 | 36 | 25 | ▲12 | 69.44% (▲33.33%) | 57,391 | 57.94% (▲9.93%) |
| Liberal-Progressive | Albert Hickman | 23 | 36 | 10 | ▼13 | 27.78% (▼36.11%) | 40,492 | 40.88% (▼10.62%) |
| Other | | 0 | 1 | 1 | ▲1 | 2.78% (▲2.78%) | 1,166 | 1.18% (▲0.68%) |
| Totals | | 36 | 73 | 36 | Steady | 100% | 99,049 (Note: This figure includes votes cast for more than one candidate in multi-member districts. A total of 42,645 individual votes were cast in this election.) | 100% |

== Results by district ==
- Names in **boldface type** represent party leaders.
- † indicates that the incumbent did not run again.
- ‡ indicates that the incumbent ran in a different district.

=== St. John's ===
| Electoral district | Candidates | | Incumbent |
| Electoral district | Liberal-Progressive | Liberal-Conservative | Incumbent |
|---|---|---|---|
| St. John's East; 74.21% turnout | Michael Caul; 1,088; 7.89% | William Higgins; 3,654; 26.49% | William Higgins |
| St. John's East; 74.21% turnout | Charles Ryan; 1,081; 7.84% | Cyril Fox; 3,557; 25.79% | Cyril Fox |
| St. John's East; 74.21% turnout | Lewis Edward Emerson; 1,039; 7.53% | Nicholas Vinnicombe; 3,375; 24.47% | Nicholas Vinnicombe |
| St. John's West; 87.50% turnout | Joseph Fitzgibbon; 1,676; 11.87% | John Crosbie; 3,298; 23.36% | Charles Hunt† |
| St. John's West; 87.50% turnout | Reg Dowden; 1,661; 11.77% | William Browne; 3,115; 22.06% | Michael Cashin† |
| St. John's West; 87.50% turnout | Andrew Duffy; 1,359; 9.63% | William Linegar; 3,009; 21.31% | Richard Squires† |

=== Conception Bay ===
| Electoral district | Candidates | | Incumbent |
| Electoral district | Liberal-Progressive | Liberal-Conservative | Incumbent |
|---|---|---|---|
| Bay de Verde; 72.55% turnout | William Cave; 851; 23.88% | Richard Cramm; 1,025; 28.77% | William Cave |
| Bay de Verde; 72.55% turnout | Wallace Goobie; 708; 19.87% | John Puddester; 979; 27.48% | Richard Cramm |
| Carbonear; 66.07% turnout | Robert Duff; 423; 54.16% | John Rorke Jr. 358; 45.84% | James Moore† |
| Harbour Grace; 71.07% turnout | **Albert Hickman**; 1,049; 17.66% | John R. Bennett; 1,034; 17.41% | Archibald Piccott† |
| Harbour Grace; 71.07% turnout | Frank Archibald; 957; 16.11% | Charles Russell; 1,014; 17.07% | Ernest Simmons |
| Harbour Grace; 71.07% turnout | Augustus Calpin; 938; 15.79% | Ernest Simmons; 947; 15.95% | Augustus Calpin |
| Harbour Main; 59.66% turnout | Matthew Hawco; 628; 22.42% | William Woodford; 884; 31.56% | Matthew Hawco |
| Harbour Main; 59.66% turnout | Leo Carter; 504; 17.99% | Cyril Cahill; 785; 28.03% | William Woodford |
| Port de Grave; 60.23% turnout | Robert Smith; 519; 49.76% | F. Gordon Bradley; 524; 50.24% | Harry A. Winter† |

=== Avalon Peninsula ===
| Electoral district | Candidates | | Incumbent |
| Electoral district | Liberal-Progressive | Liberal-Conservative | Incumbent |
|---|---|---|---|
| Ferryland; 90.08% turnout | Joseph P. Burke; 384; 14.95% | Peter Cashin; 1,016; 39.55% | Peter Cashin |
| Ferryland; 90.08% turnout | Thomas Coady; 322; 12.53% | Philip Moore; 847; 32.97% | Philip Moore |
| Placentia and St. Mary's; 72.34% turnout | James Bindon; 916; 10.57% | Michael Sullivan; 2,523; 29.10% | Michael Sullivan |
| Placentia and St. Mary's; 72.34% turnout | P. J. Murphy; 473; 5.46% | William Walsh; 2,448; 28.24% | William Walsh |
| Placentia and St. Mary's; 72.34% turnout | M. J. Ryan; 392; 4.52% | Edward Sinnott; 1,917; 22.11% | Edward Sinnott |

=== Eastern Newfoundland ===
| Electoral district | Candidates | | Incumbent |
| Electoral district | Liberal-Progressive | Liberal-Conservative | Incumbent |
|---|---|---|---|
| Bonavista; 68.79% turnout | Chesley Forbes; 2,056; 15.93% | **Walter Monroe**; 2,330; 18.06% | William Coaker† |
| Bonavista; 68.79% turnout | Arthur Barnes; 2,003; 15.52% | Lewis Little; 2,264; 17.54% | Robert G. Winsor† |
| Bonavista; 68.79% turnout | Leonard Stick; 1,994; 15.45% | William C. Winsor; 2,258; 17.50% | John Abbott† |
| Trinity; 52.96% turnout | William Halfyard; 1,814; 19.85% | Harold Mitchell; 1,388; 15.19% | William Halfyard |
| Trinity; 52.96% turnout | Isaac Randell; 1,697; 18.57% | William A. King; 1,336; 14.62% | Isaac Randell |
| Trinity; 52.96% turnout | Edwin Godden; 1,645; 18.00% | Arch Tait; 1,257; 13.76% | Richard Hibbs‡ (ran in Fogo) |

=== Central Newfoundland ===
| Electoral district | Candidates | | Incumbent |
| Electoral district | Liberal-Progressive | Liberal-Conservative | Incumbent |
|---|---|---|---|
| Fogo; 63.22% turnout | Richard Hibbs; 859; 55.70% | Martin G. Dalton; 683; 44.29% | George Grimes‡ (ran in Twillingate) |
| Twillingate; 61.88% turnout | Kenneth Brown; 2,532; 21.67% | James S. Ayre; 1,737; 14.86% | Kenneth Brown |
| Twillingate; 61.88% turnout | George Grimes; 2,219; 18.99% | Walter B. Milley; 1,556; 13.31% | Arthur Barnes‡ (ran in Bonavista) |
| Twillingate; 61.88% turnout | Thomas Ashbourne; 2,205; 18.87% | Joseph Peters; 1,437; 12.30% | George Jones† |

=== Southern and Western Newfoundland ===
| Electoral district | Candidates | | | Incumbent |
| Electoral district | Liberal-Progressive | Liberal-Conservative | Other | Incumbent |
|---|---|---|---|---|
| Burgeo and LaPoile; 62.76% turnout | Harvey Small; 537; 40.44% | Walter Chambers; 791; 59.56% | | Harvey Small |
| Burin; 58.87% turnout | George Harris; 850; 25.01% | H. B. C. Lake; 871; 25.63% | | George Harris |
| Burin; 58.87% turnout | Marmaduke Winter; 818; 24.07% | J. J. Long; 860; 25.30% | | Samuel Foote† |
| Fortune Bay; 48.71% turnout | Frederick Lukins; 120; 8.47% | Charles Jeffrey; 131; 9.24% | William Warren; 1,166; 82.29% | William Warren |
| St. Barbe; 71.50% turnout | J. H. Scammell; 1,140; 50.44% | Joseph Moore; 1,120; 49.56% | | J. H. Scammell |
| St. George's; 65.50% turnout | Joseph Downey; 1,035; 49.33% | Thomas Power; 1,063; 50.67% | | Joseph Downey |
