= Joseph Moore (Newfoundland politician) =

Newfoundland politician (1864–1940)

Joseph Moore MHA

Member of the Newfoundland House of Assembly for White Bay
- In office June 11, 1932 – February 16, 1934
- Preceded by: Joseph Strong
- Succeeded by: Sam Drover (post-Confederation)

Personal details
- Born: March 6, 1864 Carbonear, Newfoundland Colony
- Died: August 20, 1940 (aged 76) St. John's, Newfoundland
- Party: United Newfoundland
- Spouse: Deborah Mifflin (m. 1887)
- Relatives: Ernest Gear (son-in-law)
- Occupation: Businessman

Joseph Moore (March 6, 1864 – August 20, 1940) was a merchant and politician in Newfoundland. As a member of the United Newfoundland Party supporting Frederick C. Alderdice, Moore served as the member of the Newfoundland House of Assembly for White Bay from 1932 to 1934.

== Business career and politics ==
Moore was born on March 6, 1864 in Carbonear as the son of Henry Moore, a merchant, and Agnes (née Taylor). He took charge of his father's enterprise in 1889 and renamed it J. & F. Moore. He established new branches and stores across the country including in St. Anthony, Griquet, and Cook's Harbour.

Moore first attempted to enter the political arena in 1923 as a Liberal-Labour-Progressive candidate for the district of St. Barbe, failing to oust incumbent Fishermen's Protective Union (FPU) MHA J. H. Scammell. After two more unsuccessful candidacies in 1924 and 1928, Moore was finally elected to the House of Assembly in 1932 as a United Newfoundland Party candidate supporting Frederick C. Alderdice for the district of White Bay. However, the House of Assembly would vote to abolish itself less than two years later following the recommendations of the Amulree Commission in 1934.

Moore retired following the abolition of self-government, and he died in St. John's on August 20, 1940.
