= Ernest Gear =

Newfoundland politician (1887–1955)

Ernest Gear MHA
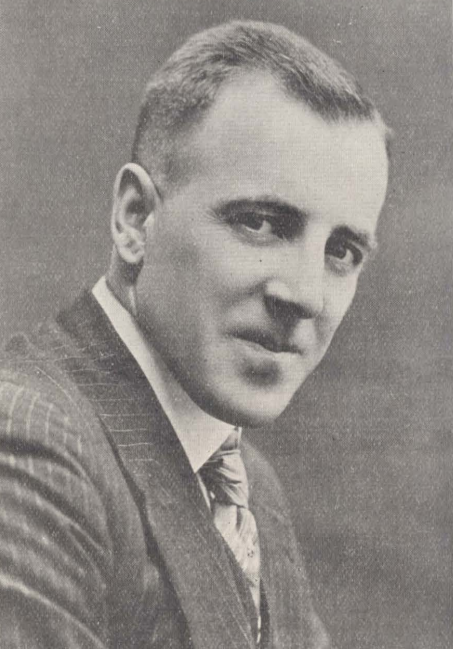
- Gear in 1933

Member of the Newfoundland House of Assembly for Port de Grave
- In office March 21, 1933 – February 16, 1934
- Preceded by: James S. Ayre
- Succeeded by: George Makinson (post-Confederation)

Personal details
- Born: Ernest Frederick Gear; June 24, 1887 St. John's, Newfoundland Colony
- Died: December 16, 1955 (aged 68) St. John's, Newfoundland, Canada
- Party: United Newfoundland
- Spouse: Irene Moore (m. 1921)
- Children: 2
- Relatives: Henry Gear (father); Joseph Moore (father-in-law)
- Occupation: Businessman

Ernest Frederick Gear (June 24, 1887 – December 16, 1955) was a businessman and politician in Newfoundland. As a member of the United Newfoundland Party supporting Frederick C. Alderdice, Gear served as the member of the Newfoundland House of Assembly (MHA) for Port de Grave from 1933 to 1934. He was the last person to be elected to the House of Assembly before the legislature voted to abolish itself in accordance with the recommendations of the Amulree Commission.

== Early life and military service ==
Gear was born in St. John's as the son of businessman Henry Gear and Ellen Boyd (née McDougall). He was educated at the Methodist College in St. John's.

When the First World War broke out in August 1914, Gear was living in Canada. He enlisted as a Private in the 1st Canadian Division and was assigned to the 7th Battery of the Royal Field Artillery. Gear was gassed during the Battle of Hill 70 and wounded in the later stages of the Battle of Passchendaele. Upon returning home in St. John's, Gear took over as the managing director of his father's secondary business Gear and Company. In 1921, he married Irene Moore, daughter of Joseph Moore, who would eventually become Gear's colleague in the House of Assembly as the representative for White Bay.

== Politics ==
Gear entered politics after James S. Ayre, the incumbent MHA for Port de Grave, resigned due to ill health. On March 21, 1933, he successfully contested the resulting by-election as a candidate for the United Newfoundland Party supporting Prime Minister Frederick C. Alderdice, defeating former MHA and seasoned campaigner Richard Cramm.

At the time of the by-election, the Dominion of Newfoundland was under the examination of the Amulree Commission, which would recommend the abolition of the legislature later that year. The House of Assembly unanimously ratified the conclusions of the commission, and it was formally abolished on February 16, 1934. Gear was the last person to be elected in Newfoundland until the Newfoundland National Convention was convened in 1946. The Dominion would eventually vote to join Canada in 1948.

Following the abolition of self-government, Gear returned to his business in St. John's. He died on December 16, 1955.

== Electoral history ==
Port de Grave by-election, March 21, 1933
| Party | Candidate | Votes | % | ±% |
|---|---|---|---|---|
| United Newfoundland | Ernest Gear | 1,752 | 55.67 | ▼11.46 |
| Liberal | Richard Cramm | 1,395 | 44.33 | ▲11.46 |
| Total valid votes | | 3,147 | 99.78 | |
| Total rejected ballots | | 7 | 0.22 | |
| Total votes | | 3,154 | | |
| United Newfoundland hold | | Swing | | -22.92 |
Source: Newfoundland Gazette, April 18, 1933
