= Walter Stanley Monroe =

9th Prime Minister of Newfoundland (1924–1928)

The Right Honourable Walter Stanley Monroe MLC MHA
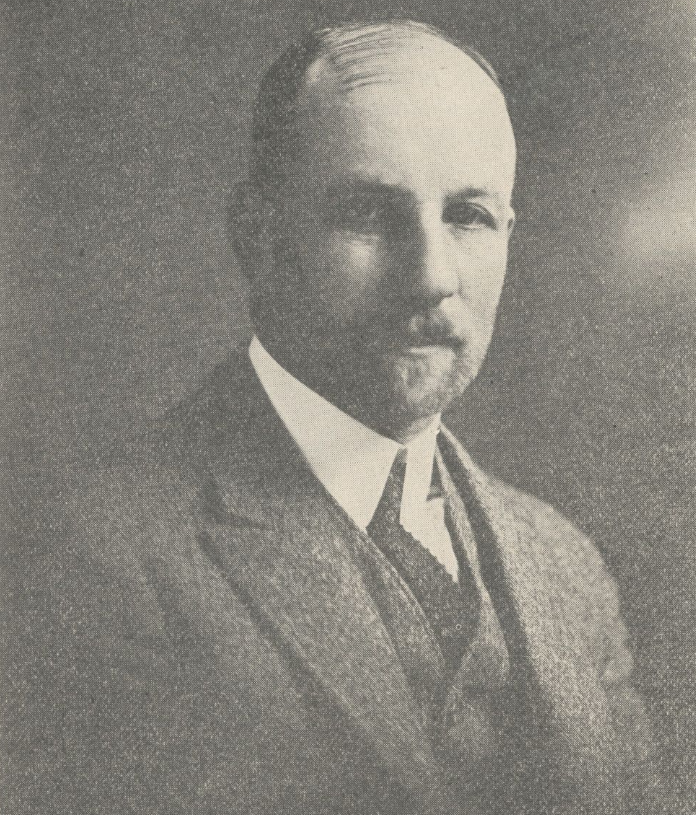
- Monroe in 1927

9th Prime Minister of Newfoundland
- In office June 9, 1924 – August 15, 1928
- Monarch: George V
- Governor: William Allardyce
- Preceded by: Albert Hickman
- Succeeded by: Frederick C. Alderdice

Member of the Legislative Council of Newfoundland
- In office February 7, 1933 – February 16, 1934
- Nominated by: Frederick C. Alderdice
- Appointed by: Murray Anderson

Member of the Newfoundland House of Assembly for Bonavista Bay
- In office June 2, 1924 – October 29, 1928 Serving with Lewis Little and William C. Winsor
- Preceded by: William Coaker; Robert G. Winsor; John Abbott
- Succeeded by: J. H. Scammell; William Coaker; Robert G. Winsor; Herman Quinton

Personal details
- Born: May 14, 1871 Dublin, Ireland
- Died: October 6, 1952 (aged 81) St. John's, Newfoundland, Canada
- Party: Liberal-Conservative Progressive
- Spouse: Helen Isobel Smith (m. 1899)
- Children: 1 son (Arthur)
- Relatives: John Monroe (father); Moses Monroe (uncle); Frederick C. Alderdice (cousin); Moses Harvey (greatuncle)
- Occupation: Businessman

Walter Stanley Monroe (May 14, 1871 – October 6, 1952) was an Irish businessman and politician who served as the prime minister of Newfoundland from 1924 to 1928 as the leader of the Liberal-Conservative Progressive Party.

== Early life and family ==
Monroe was born on May 14, 1871 in 35 Fitzwilliam Square, Dublin, Ireland as the first son of John Monroe, a distinguished lawyer who became Solicitor-General for Ireland, and his wife Elizabeth Moule from Elmley Lovett, Worcestershire, England. He was educated at Harrow School, England. At the age of 17 in 1888, Monroe emigrated to Newfoundland to join his uncle, Moses Monroe, who was a prominent merchant in St. John's.

== Business and politics ==
Following Moses Monroe's death, Walter Monroe became a successful businessman in his own right. He established the export firm Bishop and Monroe Company alongside Robert Bishop. They dissolved their partnership in 1909, and Monroe became the sole owner of the Monroe Export Company. A prominent figure in the St. John's business community, Monroe became the president of the Imperial Tobacco Company as well as the director of the Colonial Cordage Company.

Monroe first entered politics in the 1923 general election when he ran as one of the opposition Liberal-Labour-Progressive candidates for the district of Bonavista Bay. Although Monroe lost to the incumbent Fishermen's Protective Union (FPU) ticket led by William Coaker, the election was unexpectedly close. When the government of Richard Squires collapsed and his attorney general William Warren took over as prime minister, Monroe was appointed as a Minister without portfolio in Warren's administration. Warren was unable to hold onto a majority government, and in the ensuing political chaos, a group of St. John's merchants convened and cobbled together the Liberal-Conservative Progressive party with Monroe as its leader. The new party, which campaigned on "good, clean government," won a secure majority government in the ensuing 1924 election.

== Prime Minister (1924–1928) ==
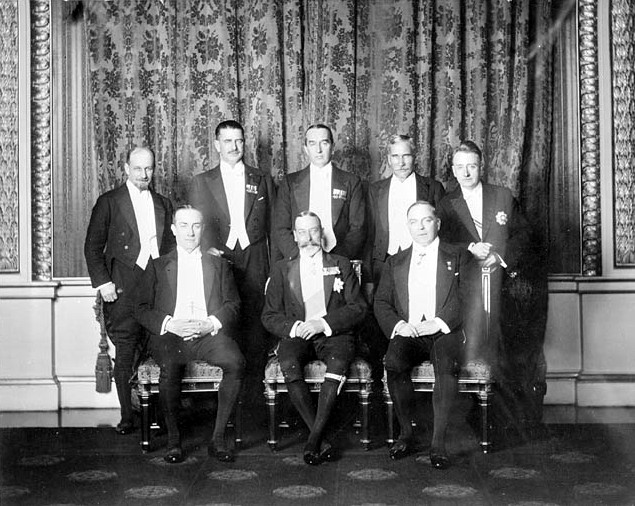
Monroe (Back row first left) at the 1926 Imperial Conference

One of Monroe's first initiatives as prime minister was to abolish the personal income tax and reduce the corporate taxes paid by the banks. This financial loss was intended to be replaced with increased tariffs. The opposition contended that Monroe sought to protect his cabinet's business interests by making certain businesses (including Imperial Tobacco and Colonial Cordage) exempt from the duties paid on imports. Other major corporations, including the Anglo-Newfoundland Development Company, petitioned to receive similar concessions, which limited the impact of the tariffs.

Monroe was sympathetic to the suffragist cause, and his government introduced a women's franchise bill to the House of Assembly in 1925. The bill passed unanimously on March 9 and became law on April 3, 1925, allowing Newfoundland women to vote in elections for the first time.

Newfoundland's financial situation continued to worsen during Monroe's premiership as revenues did not meet expectations. His administration attempted to invest in road work programs to provide additional employment, but the increase in government jobs could not match the growing unemployment rate. Amidst increased relief payments, Monroe wrote to the Evening Telegram in 1926 warning that "able bodied poor relief has got to stop at once if this country wishes to maintain her independence." Having doubts about the dominion's capacity for self-government, he told his fellow delegates at the 1926 Imperial Conference that Newfoundland "had no particular desire to relinquish the watchful protection of the mother country."

In 1927, the Monroe government saw the successful settlement of the Labrador boundary dispute with Canada after Newfoundland successfully argued its case at the Judicial Committee of the Privy Council in London.

== Later life ==
Monroe resigned the premiership on August 15, 1928, and he named his cousin Frederick C. Alderdice as his successor. He ran for re-election to the House of Assembly in 1928, but lost his seat to Coaker and the FPU ticket. In 1933, Monroe was made a member of the Legislative Council of Newfoundland by Alderdice. Along with much of Newfoundland's mercantile elite, he was an active supporter of a temporary commission of government, which was installed in 1934 following the voluntary dissolution of Newfoundland's legislative body. Monroe continued managing the Monroe Export Company until World War II.

Monroe died at his home in St. John's on October 6, 1952. He was the only pre-confederation Prime Minister of Newfoundland to live to confederation.

Political offices
Preceded by Albert Hickman	Prime Minister of Newfoundland; 1924–1928	Succeeded by Frederick C. Alderdice
