= Herman William Quinton =

Canadian politician (1896–1952)

The Honourable Herman William Quinton
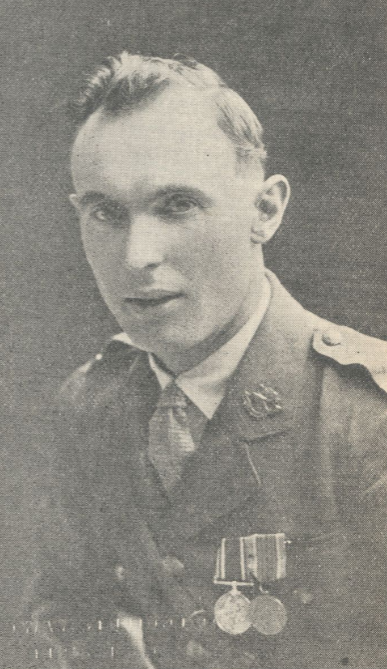
- Quinton in military uniform, 1927

Senator from Burgeo-La Poile, Newfoundland
- In office January 24, 1951 – April 2, 1952
- Nominated by: Louis St. Laurent
- Appointed by: Viscount Alexander of Tunis
Ministerial and commission offices
Minister of Finance
In office July 29, 1949 – 1950
Premier	Joey Smallwood
Preceded by	Gordon A. Winter (acting)
Succeeded by	Joey Smallwood
Commissioner for Public Health and Welfare
In office 1947–1949
Preceded by	John C. Puddester
Succeeded by	James Chalker (as Minister of Health)
Minister of Public Works
In office 1932–1934
Prime Minister	Frederick C. Alderdice
Preceded by	Richard Hibbs
Succeeded by	Thomas Lodge (as Commissioner of Public Utilities)
Legislative offices
Member of the Newfoundland House of Assembly for Burgeo-La Poile
In office May 27, 1949 – 1950
Preceded by	James A. Winter (pre-Confederation)
Succeeded by	George Norman
Member of the Newfoundland House of Assembly for Bonavista South
In office October 29, 1928 – February 16, 1934
Preceded by	Lewis Little; Walter S. Monroe; William C. Winsor (as MHAs for Bonavista Bay)
Succeeded by	Ted Russell (post-Confederation)

Personal details
- Born: October 26, 1896 Red Cliff, Newfoundland Colony
- Died: April 2, 1952 (aged 55) St. John's, Newfoundland, Canada
- Party: Liberal-Conservative (1928–1932); United Newfoundland (1932–1934); Liberal (1949–1952)
- Spouse: Ella Blackmore (m. 1921)
- Children: 2
- Relatives: Dave Quinton (nephew)
- Education: Bishop Feild College
- Occupation: Teacher, merchant

Military service
- Allegiance: Newfoundland
- Branch/service: British Army
- Rank: Lieutenant
- Unit: Royal Newfoundland Regiment
- Battles/wars: First World War: Western Front

Herman William Quinton (October 28, 1896 – April 2, 1952) was a Newfoundlander and Canadian politician.

== Military service and mercantile career ==
Quinton was born in Red Cliff, Bonavista Bay to Jacob Quinton and Sarah (née Benger). After graduating from Bishop Feild College in St. John's, he worked as a school teacher from 1913 to 1914 and, afterwards, joined Sir William Coaker in the Fisherman's Union Trading Company managing various branches before becoming dry goods superintendent.

Quinton served with the Newfoundland Regiment during World War I and saw action in France and Belgium. He achieved the rank of lieutenant in 1918. He became secretary-treasurer of the Great War Veterans' Association of Newfoundland in 1924.

Following the war, he went back to the Trading Company before joining A.E. Hickman & Co. as a travelling salesman. From 1928 to 1932, Quinton was manager for an export division of the Monroe Export Co.

He married Ella Blackmore in 1921.

== Politics ==
Quinton was elected to the Newfoundland House of Assembly in 1928 representing Bonavista and was re-elected in 1932 defeating a young Joey Smallwood. He served as minister of public works in the Newfoundland government until responsible government was suspended in 1934 in favour of a Commission of Government appointed by London. He was appointed magistrate for St. Barbe district.

Following the death of Sir John Charles Puddester, Quinton was appointed to the Commission of Government in 1947 to fill Puddester's portfolio as Commissioner of Public Health and Welfare. In this period, the dominion was considering whether or not to join Canada as a province, and Quinton was one of only two commissioners to support joining confederation. Following Newfoundland's entry into Canadian Confederation, he was elected to the new House of Assembly representing Burgeo-LaPoile for the Liberal Party of Newfoundland and served in the new provincial government as Minister of Finance in Premier Joey Smallwood's first Cabinet.

He retired from provincial politics in 1950 and was appointed to the Senate of Canada on January 24, 1951 on the recommendation of Louis St-Laurent. He represented the senatorial division of Burgeo-Lapoile, Newfoundland as a member of the Liberal Party of Canada until his death in St. John's at the age of 55.
