= John Hubert Penson =

British civil servant and botanist (1893–1979)

John Hubert Penson CB CMG MC

Commissioner of Finance of Newfoundland
- In office 10 May 1937 – February 1941
- Preceded by: Everard Trentham
- Succeeded by: Ira Wild

Personal details
- Born: 21 January 1893 Hornsey, London, United Kingdom
- Died: 1 June 1979 (aged 86) Southern General Hospital, Glasgow, United Kingdom
- Education: University of London

John Hubert Penson (21 January 1893 – 1 June 1979) was a British civil servant and botanist. He served as Commissioner of Finance on the Newfoundland Commission of Government between 1937 and 1941.

== Biography ==
Penson was born in Hornsey, London, to Arthur Penson, a dairy manager in Cirencester. He graduated from the University of London with a first class degree in history in 1912. On 26 August 1916, he was assigned to the 5th Division Signal Company of the Royal Engineers as a second lieutenant; he was promoted to lieutenant in 1918. That same year, he received the Military Cross for "gallantry...in maintaining communications which had to be constantly repaired under heavy shell fire." A year later, in 1919, he received a first bar on his Military Cross for gallantry during the Russian Civil War, while he was attached to the 45th Battalion of Royal Fusiliers.

In November 1919, Penson was admitted to the bar as a member of Lincoln's Inn; the following year, he entered the Treasury. He was granted the right to wear the Officer's Cross of the Order of Polonia Restituta in 1925. In November 1928, he was appointed assistant secretary to the Royal Commission on National Museums and Galleries; between 1931 and 1934, he was attached to the government of Newfoundland, serving as an assistant and later as acting minister of finance. On 10 May 1937, he was appointed Commissioner of Finance of Newfoundland, succeeding Everard Trentham. Though disliked by the Dominions Office, his policies were met with approval by Humphrey Walwyn, who interfered when the Dominions Office considered replacing him in 1940. His term as Commissioner ended in February 1941, after which he was appointed to the British embassy in Washington, D.C. He was made a Companion of the Order of St Michael and St George on 31 December 1941.

In 1944, Penson was appointed secretary-general for the British supply mission located in Washington, D.C. After World War 2, he was appointed attaché to the British embassy in Washington, where he would stay until his retirement. He was appointed Companion of the Order of the Bath in the 1952 New Year Honours. After retirement, he moved back to Glasgow, engaging in botanical work in northern Britain, especially Scotland. Penson died on 1 June 1979 at Southern General Hospital in Glasgow.
