= Richard Cramm =

Newfoundland lawyer and politician (1889–1958)

Richard Cramm MHA

Member of the Newfoundland House of Assembly for Bay de Verde
- In office May 3, 1923 – October 29, 1928 Serving with William Cave (1923–24); John Puddester (1924–28)
- Preceded by: Frederick LeGrow
- Succeeded by: John Puddester (as sole member)

Personal details
- Born: October 13, 1889 Small Point, Newfoundland Colony
- Died: April 15, 1958 (aged 68) St. John's, Newfoundland, Canada
- Party: Liberal Reform (1923–24); Liberal-Conservative Progressive (1924–28)
- Spouse: Ollie Lynette Moores (m. 1924)
- Education: Tilton Seminary; Wesleyan University
- Occupation: Lawyer

Richard Cramm (October 13, 1889 – April 15, 1958) was a Newfoundland lawyer and politician. He represented Bay de Verde in the Newfoundland House of Assembly from 1923 to 1928.

== Education and law career ==
The son of John Cramm and Margaret King, he was born in Small Point and was educated in nearby Salem, at the Tilton Seminary in New Hampshire and at the Wesleyan University in Middletown, Connecticut. Upon returning home, Cramm published a book in 1921 called The First Five Hundred about the Royal Newfoundland Regiment during World War I.

Cramm studied law and was admitted to practice as a solicitor in 1923. He was called to the Newfoundland bar in 1924 and was named King's Counsel in 1928. In 1924, he married Ollie Lynette Moores.

== Politics ==
Cramm was elected to the Newfoundland assembly in 1923 as a member of the Liberal Reform party led by Richard Squires. After Squires stepped down as party leader, he was a supporter of his successor William Warren. However, after the Hollis Walker Report was released which recommended criminal charges against Squires, Cramm joined the opposition and moved the motion of no confidence which brought down Warren's administration.

Cramm was reelected in 1924 as a Liberal-Conservative led by Walter Monroe. He was named a minister without portfolio in the new cabinet and, in 1926, became acting Attorney General. Cramm was defeated in 1928 when he ran as an independent candidate in Carbonear. He returned to practising law in St. John's. In May and June 1932, he served as a minister without portfolio in the short-lived Squires cabinet.

In 1949, Cramm ran unsuccessfully as a Progressive Conservative candidate in the Canadian federal riding of Trinity—Conception.
