= Norman Gray (Newfoundland politician) =

Newfoundland politician (1875–1952)

Norman Gray MHA

Member of the Newfoundland House of Assembly for Twillingate
- In office June 11, 1932 – February 16, 1934
- Preceded by: Kenneth M. Brown
- Succeeded by: Leslie Curtis (post-Confederation)

Personal details
- Born: September 20, 1875 Twillingate, Newfoundland Colony
- Died: July 13, 1952 (aged 76) Twillingate, Newfoundland, Canada
- Party: United Newfoundland
- Occupation: Merchant

Norman Gray (September 20, 1875 – July 13, 1952) was a merchant and politician in Newfoundland. He represented Twillingate in the Newfoundland House of Assembly from 1932 to 1934 as a United Newfoundland Party member.

He was born in Twillingate and began work there, later moving to St. John's, where he found work in a department store. He moved to Botwood to open a branch there. He opened his own business in Angle Brook. After leaving politics in 1934, he operated Gray Stores Ltd. Gray died in Twillingate at the age of 76.
