= Thomas Lodge (civil servant) =

British civil servant (1882–1958)

Thomas Lodge CB (23 May 1882 – 10 February 1958) was a British civil servant and Liberal Party politician.

== Early life and education ==
Born in Liverpool, Lodge was educated at the Liverpool Institute and Trinity College, Cambridge, from which he graduated in history in 1904.

== Career ==
Lodge joined the Board of Trade as an upper division clerk in 1905 and was promoted to principal clerk in 1917. In February 1918, he was appointed assistant secretary of the Ministry of Shipping, and in July 1919 he became secretary and represented the department at the Versailles Conference. He was appointed Companion of the Order of the Bath (CB) in the 1920 New Year War Honours.

He resigned from the Civil Service in March 1920, and from 1921 to 1930 served as honorary financial adviser to Fridtjof Nansen in his philanthropic work for the League of Nations and Russia. He was a member of the Commission of Government of Newfoundland from 1934 to 1937.

In 1939, he was Liberal prospective parliamentary candidate for Bedford. In 1945, he was Liberal parliamentary candidate for St Marylebone, finishing fourth with 8% of the vote.
