= James Moore (Newfoundland politician) =

Newfoundland politician (1869–1946)

James Moore MHA
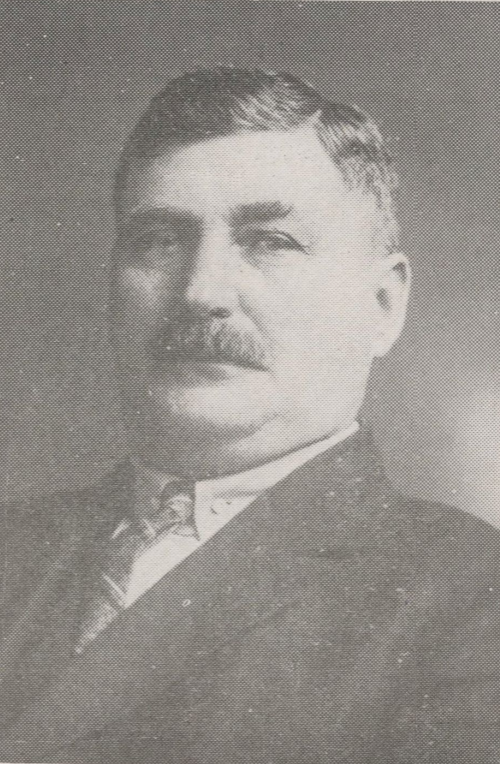
- Moore in 1930

Member of the Newfoundland House of Assembly for Carbonear
- In office October 29, 1928 – June 11, 1932
- Preceded by: Robert Duff
- Succeeded by: John C. Puddester (as MHA for Carbonear-Bay de Verde)
- In office May 3, 1923 – June 2, 1924
- Preceded by: William F. Penney
- Succeeded by: Robert Duff

Personal details
- Born: November 27, 1869 Carbonear, Newfoundland Colony
- Died: May 23, 1946 (aged 76) Carbonear, Newfoundland
- Party: Liberal-Labour-Progressive (1923–1924); Liberal-Conservative Progressive (1928–1932)
- Spouse: Georgina Torphy (m. 1892)
- Children: 5
- Occupation: Businessman

James Moore (November 27, 1869 – May 23, 1946) was a merchant and politician in Newfoundland. He represented Carbonear in the Newfoundland House of Assembly from 1923 to 1924 and again from 1928 to 1932.

== Early life and business career ==
Moore was born on November 23, 1869 in Carbonear as the son of Robert and Patience Moore. He was educated at St. James' Anglican School in Carbonear. Following his father Robert's death in 1901, Moore assumed control of his enterprise. His son, also named James, joined him in 1927 to form James Moore & Son.

Moore entered politics in 1923 when he successfully ran as the Liberal-Labour-Progressive candidate supporting John R. Bennett for the district of Carbonear. Although he was defeated by Liberal candidate Robert Duff in 1924, he retook the seat in 1928 following Duff's retirement. Moore chose to retire in 1932, and he spent the remainder of his life in Carbonear before dying there on May 23, 1946.
