= James S. Ayre =

Newfoundland politician (1881–1953)

The Honourable James S. Ayre MHA

Minister without portfolio
- In office 1932 – March 21, 1933
- Prime Minister: Frederick C. Alderdice

Member of the Newfoundland House of Assembly for Port de Grave
- In office June 11, 1932 – March 21, 1933
- Preceded by: Robert Smith
- Succeeded by: Ernest Gear

Personal details
- Born: James Stewart Ayre; August 15, 1881 St. John's, Newfoundland Colony
- Died: October 16, 1953 (aged 72) St. John's, Newfoundland, Canada
- Party: United Newfoundland
- Education: Liverpool College
- Occupation: Businessman

James Stewart Ayre (August 15, 1881 – October 16, 1953) was a businessman and political figure in Newfoundland. He represented Port de Grave in the Newfoundland and Labrador House of Assembly from 1932 to 1933.

== Early life and background ==
He was born in St. John's and educated at the Methodist College there and at Liverpool College in England. After completing his education, he entered the family business in 1898, becoming a director in 1914 and chairman of the board in 1937. Ayre was also president of the Newfoundland Clothing Company.

== Politics ==
He ran unsuccessfully for a seat in the Newfoundland assembly in 1924 and in 1928 before being elected in 1932. Ayre resigned his seat in 1933. He served in the Newfoundland Executive Council as a minister without portfolio. Ayre died in St. John's in 1953.
