= John Parsons (Newfoundland politician) =

Newfoundland politician

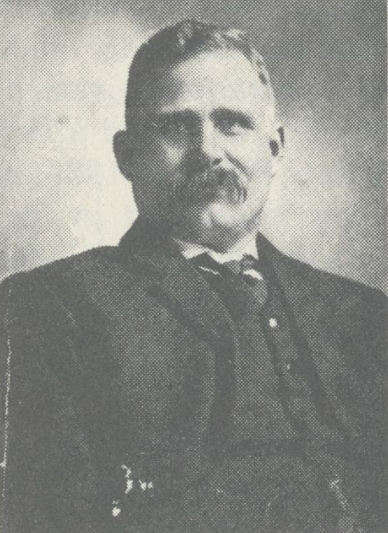

Member of House of Assembly of Bay Roberts
- In office 1928–1932
- Preceded by: District created
- Succeeded by: James S. Ayre

Personal details
- Born: 1868 Bay Roberts, Newfoundland Colony
- Died: March 18, 1949 (aged 80–81) Dominion of Newfoundland
- Party: Liberal

John Parsons (1868 – March 18, 1949) was a businessman, ship's captain and political figure in Newfoundland. He represented Bay Roberts in the Newfoundland and Labrador House of Assembly from 1928 to 1932 as a Liberal.

He was born in Bay Roberts, the son of James Parsons and Ellen King, and was educated there. Parsons married Susannah Calpin. He operated a wholesale-retail business in the Bay Roberts area and also captained ships operating in the seal fishery. He opposed union with Canada. Parsons joined the opposition Conservatives in 1932 after Squires was accused of corruption. He did not run for reelection in 1932.
