= Michael A. Shea =

Newfoundland politician (1894–1954)

Michael Shea MHA

Member of the Newfoundland House of Assembly for Ferryland
- In office June 11, 1932 – February 16, 1934
- Preceded by: Peter Cashin
- Succeeded by: Peter Cashin (post-Confederation)

Personal details
- Born: Michael Anthony Shea; March 4, 1894 St. John's, Newfoundland Colony
- Died: May 4, 1954 (aged 60) St. John's, Newfoundland, Canada
- Party: United Newfoundland Party
- Spouse: Ellen Mary Evans
- Occupation: Businessman

Michael Anthony Shea (March 4, 1894 – May 4, 1954) was a politician in the Dominion of Newfoundland. He represented Ferryland in the Newfoundland House of Assembly from 1932 to 1934 as a United Newfoundland Party member.

The son of John P. Shea and Jane Griffon, he was born in St. John's and was educated there. Shea left school in 1909 to work as a clerk at the Monroe Export Co. In 1926, he became a director of the company. Shea was also a director for Newfoundland Wholesale Dry Goods Ltd. He ran unsuccessfully for a seat in the Newfoundland assembly in 1928 before being elected in 1932.

Shea married Ellen Mary Evans. He died in St. John's at the age of 60.
