= Charles James Furey =

Newfoundland politician (1874–1973)

Charles Furey MHA

Member of the Newfoundland House of Assembly for Harbour Main-Bell Island
- In office 11 June 1932 – 6 February 1934 Serving with William Browne
- Preceded by: Philip Lewis
- Succeeded by: David Jackman (post-Confederation)

Personal details
- Born: Charles James Furey; July 20, 1874 Harbour Main, Newfoundland Colony
- Died: March 10, 1973 (aged 98) Harbour Main, Newfoundland, Canada
- Party: United Newfoundland
- Spouse: Susie Gellately
- Relations: Charles Furey (father)
- Profession: Telegraph and train station operator

Charles James Furey (July 20, 1874 – March 10, 1973) was a businessman and political figure in Newfoundland. He represented Harbour Main-Bell Island in the Newfoundland and Labrador House of Assembly from 1932 to 1934 as a member of the United Newfoundland Party.

Furey was born in Harbour Main, the son of Charles J. Furey, and was educated in Harbour Main and Avondale. Furey trained as a telegraph operator and then travelled and worked in various places in the United States and Canada. In 1902, he returned to Newfoundland and became a train station operator in Port Blandford.

In 1912, he returned to Harbour Main, where he became a fish dealer. Furey ran unsuccessfully for a seat in the Newfoundland assembly in 1928 before being elected in 1932. After 1934, he served as a relief officer with the Department of Health and helped set up the Harbour Main school board. Furey died in Harbour Main at the age of 98.
