= Nathan G. Winsor =

Canadian business manager and politician

- Born: Nathan George Winsor; July 16, 1892; Swain's Island, Newfoundland Colony
- Died: June 29, 1959 (aged 66)
- Occupations: business manager, politician
- Known for: Newfoundland House of Assembly (1930–1932)
- Spouse: Gertrude Blackwood (m. 1914)
- Parents: Jacob Winsor (father); Mary Hill (mother)

Nathan George Winsor (July 16, 1892 – June 29, 1959) was a business manager and politician in Newfoundland. He represented Bonavista North in the Newfoundland House of Assembly from 1930 to 1932.

The son of Jacob Winsor and Mary Hill, he was born in Swain's Island, Bonavista Bay and was educated there and in Wesleyville. After completing his education, he was employed in fishing for 15 years. In 1910, he became mail officer for the SS Dundee. Winsor operated his own general store in Wesleyville for a few years before being hired by the Union Trading Company store there in 1919. He became store manager in 1929 following Robert G. Winsor's death. He was elected to the Newfoundland assembly in a 1930 by-election, replacing Robert G. Winsor.

Winsor married Gertrude Blackwood in 1914.

He died in Wesleyville at the age of 66.
