= Harold Mitchell (Newfoundland politician) =

Newfoundland politician (1891–1952)

The Honourable Harold Mitchell MHA

Minister without portfolio
- In office 1932–1934
- Prime Minister: Frederick C. Alderdice

Member of the Newfoundland House of Assembly for Trinity South
- In office June 11, 1932 – February 16, 1934
- Preceded by: Edwin J. Godden
- Succeeded by: Maxwell Button (post-Confederation)

Personal details
- Born: May 1891 St. John's, Newfoundland Colony
- Died: September 14, 1952 (aged 61) New York City, New York, U.S.
- Party: United Newfoundland
- Occupation: Broker

Military service
- Allegiance: Newfoundland
- Branch/service: British Army
- Rank: Sergeant
- Unit: Royal Newfoundland Regiment
- Battles/wars: First World War: Gallipoli campaign

Harold Mitchell (May 1891 – September 14, 1952) was a politician in Newfoundland. He represented Trinity South in the Newfoundland House of Assembly from 1932 to 1934 as a United Newfoundland Party member.

The son of John B. Mitchell and Anna Barnes, he was born in St. John's and later entered the family brokerage agency. In 1915, Mitchell joined the Newfoundland Regiment. He was wounded at Gallipoli and returned home to Newfoundland. He helped form the Great War Veterans' Association and served as the first president of the local branch of the association. Mitchell was an unsuccessful candidate for the Trinity Bay seat in the Newfoundland assembly in 1924 and 1928; he was elected in 1932, defeating Sir Richard Squires. He served in the Newfoundland cabinet as a minister without portfolio.

Mitchell died in New York City in 1952.
