= Kenneth M. Brown =

Newfoundland politician (1887–1955)

The Honourable Kenneth M. Brown OBE MHA
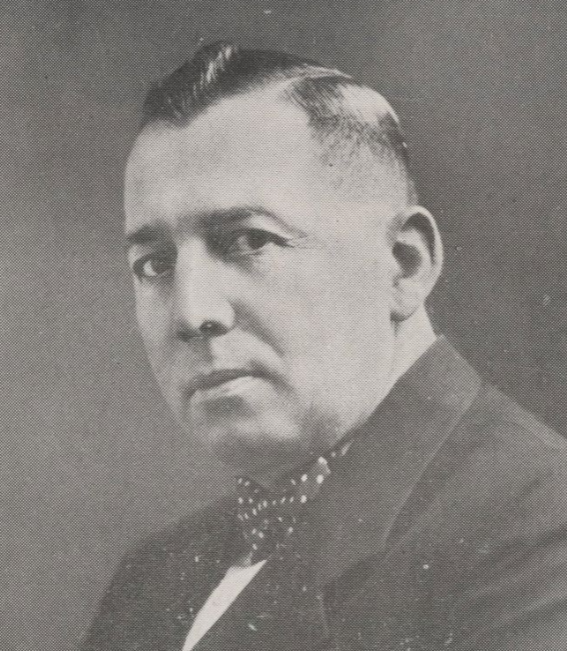
- Brown in 1930

President of the Fishermen's Protective Union
- In office November 16, 1934 – May 15, 1948
- Preceded by: J. H. Scammell
- Succeeded by: Charles Granger

Member of the Newfoundland National Convention for Bonavista South
- In office September 11, 1946 – January 30, 1948

Minister of Labour
- In office 1932 – February 16, 1934
- Prime Minister: Frederick Alderdice
- Preceded by: Portfolio established
- Succeeded by: Charles Ballam (post-Confederation)

Member of the Newfoundland House of Assembly for Grand Falls
- In office June 29, 1932 – February 16, 1934
- Preceded by: William Earle
- Succeeded by: Edward S. Spencer (post-Confederation)

Member of the Newfoundland House of Assembly for Twillingate
- In office May 3, 1923 – June 29, 1932 Serving with Arthur Barnes (1923–1924); George Jones (1923–1924); George F. Grimes (1924–1928); Thomas Ashbourne (1924–1928)
- Preceded by: Walter Jennings; Solomon Samson
- Succeeded by: Norman Gray

Personal details
- Born: Kenneth McKenzie Brown; August 3, 1887 King's Cove, Newfoundland Colony
- Died: February 28, 1955 (aged 67) St. John's, Newfoundland, Canada
- Party: Fishermen's Protective Union (1923–1932); United Newfoundland (1932–1934)
- Spouse(s): Mary Jane Crocker (m. 1913) Violet Irene Hollett (m. 1918)
- Relations: William Brown (grandfather)
- Children: 7
- Occupation: Seaman, paper mill worker

Kenneth McKenzie Brown OBE (August 3, 1887 – February 28, 1955) was a pulp and paper worker and politician in the Dominion of Newfoundland. He represented Twillingate from 1923 to 1932 as a member of the Fisherman's Protective Union and Grand Falls from 1932 to 1934 as a member of the United Newfoundland Party in the Newfoundland House of Assembly.

Brown was elected to the Newfoundland National Convention in 1946 where he was an opponent of Newfoundland's Confederation with Canada. He suffered a stroke during the convention while arguing against sending a delegation to Ottawa to work out potential Terms of Union.

== Early life ==
Brown was born in King's Cove, Bonavista Bay, the son of James Brown and Caroline Gill. He was a grandson of William Brown who was elected to represent the district of Bonavista Bay in the 1st General Assembly of Newfoundland in 1832.

Brown worked as a seaman on the British Columbia coast where he commanded his own steam ship and studied navigation at the Vancouver Nautical Academy. He returned to Newfoundland in 1912 with the body of his brother, Garland Gill Brown, who had been accidentally killed in Nanaimo. He was employed by the Anglo-Newfoundland Development Company at its mill in Grand Falls. In 1921, he led his colleagues in a general strike which successfully lessened wage reductions.

== Politics ==
Brown was a member of the Fisherman's Protective Union (FPU). He was elected to the Newfoundland House of Assembly in 1923 as one of the three members for the district of Twillingate. Following the collapse of Richard Squires' second administration in 1932, Brown defected to the nascent United Newfoundland Party led by opposition leader Frederick C. Alderdice. He was appointed as the Minister of Labour in Alderdice's cabinet before the institution of the Commission of Government. Brown would later comment that, when he left politics, he was "a shade worse off than when I entered it."

Brown became the president of the FPU in 1936. From 1944 to 1947, he was president of the Newfoundland Seamen's Association.

Brown was elected by acclamation to represent Bonavista South in the Newfoundland National Convention, and he came to oppose union with Canada. On October 30, 1946, Brown collapsed due to a cerebral hemorrhage while speaking at the convention against Joey Smallwood's resolution to send a delegation to Ottawa. During what would be his final speech, Brown held a document concerning "places in Canada where people are just as backward as they are in Newfoundland," and he claimed that if he were to read it on the floor, "there would[n't] be ten men in this House who would vote for [Smallwood's] resolution." The document was lost following Brown's collapse and it was never recovered.

Although Brown somewhat recovered from his stroke and continued to cast his votes by mail, he remained bed-ridden at the General Hospital in St. John's. He later died on February 28, 1955.
