= Roland G. Starkes =

Canadian politician

Roland G. Starkes MHA

Member of the Newfoundland House of Assembly for Green Bay
- In office October 29, 1928 – February 16, 1934
- Preceded by: Kenneth M. Brown; George F. Grimes; Thomas Ashbourne (as MHAs for Twillingate)
- Succeeded by: Baxter Morgan (post-Confederation)

Personal details
- Born: Roland George Starkes; June 4, 1890 Nipper's Harbour, Newfoundland Colony
- Died: November 19, 1950 (aged 60) Montreal, Quebec, Canada
- Party: Liberal
- Spouse: Mary Noble
- Relations: Harold Starkes (son)
- Occupation: Store owner

Roland George Starkes (June 4, 1890 – November 19, 1950) was a businessman and politician in Newfoundland. He represented Green Bay in the Newfoundland and Labrador House of Assembly from 1928 to 1934 as a Liberal.

He was born in Nippers Harbour, the son of Daniel Starkes, and was educated there. Starkes married Mary Noble. He became manager of the Union Trading Company store at Nippers Harbour in 1920. In 1924, he opened his own business there, later opening branches in Grand Behat and Lewisporte. In 1946, he was elected to represent Green Bay at the Newfoundland National Convention. Starkes supported union with Canada. He later moved to Lewisporte where he owned and operated a hotel. Starkes died in Montreal in 1950.

His son Harold later served in the Newfoundland and Labrador assembly.
