= Arthur Barnes (Newfoundland politician) =

Newfoundland educator and politician (1866–1956)

The Honourable Arthur Barnes MHA
- Barnes in 1927

Colonial Secretary
- In office 1928–1932
- Prime Minister: Richard Squires
- Preceded by: Michael S. Sullivan
- Succeeded by: John C. Puddester (as Secretary of State)

Minister of Education
- In office 1920–1924
- Prime Minister: Richard Squires; William Warren; Alfred Hickman
- Preceded by: Portfolio established
- Succeeded by: Walter S. Monroe

Member of the Newfoundland House of Assembly for Burgeo
- In office 1928 – June 11, 1932
- Preceded by: Walter M. Chambers
- Succeeded by: James A. Winter

Member of the Newfoundland House of Assembly for Harbour Grace
- In office November 3, 1919 – May 3, 1923 Serving with Frank C. Archibald and George A. Gosse
- Preceded by: Edward Parsons; Archibald Piccott; Moses M. Young
- Succeeded by: Augustus Calpin; Archibald Piccott; Ernest Simmons
- In office October 31, 1904 – November 2, 1908 Serving with Eli Dawe and William Oke
- Preceded by: Augustus W. Harvey
- Succeeded by: Edward Parsons; Archibald Piccott

Personal details
- Born: November 17, 1866 Topsail, Newfoundland Colony
- Died: November 24, 1956 (aged 90) Bay Roberts, Newfoundland, Canada
- Party: Liberal
- Occupation: School teacher

Arthur Barnes (November 17, 1866 – November 24, 1956) was an educator and political figure in Newfoundland. He represented Harbour Grace from 1904 to 1908 and from 1919 to 1923 and Burgeo from 1928 to 1932 in the Newfoundland and Labrador House of Assembly as a Liberal.

== Early life and career ==
Barnes was born in Topsail, Conception Bay, the son of John Barnes and was educated in St. John's. Barnes taught school at Coley's Point, Bay Roberts and St. John's. He was vice-principal of Bishop Feild College and was principal for a school in Bay Roberts. His fiancée Emmeline Dawe died of tuberculosis before they could be married and Barnes took on the care of Dawe's mother, a widow. He served nine years as principal for the normal school in St. John's from 1908 to 1917.

== Politics ==
Barnes became the first Minister of Education for Newfoundland. Barnes was defeated when he ran for election in Bonavista in 1924. He was elected again in a 1928 by-election. From 1928 to 1932, he served under Prime Minister Richard Squires in the positions of Colonial Secretary and Railway Commissioner. Barnes resigned his seat in 1932 after he was promised a post as governor of the Bank of Newfoundland; he was not named to the post because of a change in government. He died in Bay Roberts at the age of 90.
