= Helena Squires =

Newfoundland politician (1879–1959)

Helena Squires MHA

Member of the Newfoundland House of Assembly for Lewisporte
- In office May 17, 1930 – June 11, 1932
- Preceded by: George F. Grimes
- Succeeded by: Kenneth M. Brown (as MHA for Grand Falls)

Personal details
- Born: Helena Emeline Strong; October 29, 1878 Little Bay Islands, Newfoundland Colony
- Died: March 21, 1959 (aged 80) Toronto, Ontario, Canada
- Party: Liberal
- Spouse: Richard Squires (m. 1905)
- Children: 7
- Education: Mount Allison University
- Occupation: Teacher

Helena Emeline Squires (née Strong; October 29, 1878 – March 21, 1959) was a Newfoundland teacher and politician. She was the wife of Prime Minister Sir Richard Squires. In 1930, she was elected as the member of the Newfoundland House of Assembly for Lewisporte, making her the first woman to ever stand for and win a seat in the House of Assembly.

== Biography ==
Lady Helena E. Squires (née Strong) was born in Little Bay Islands, Newfoundland, in 1879. She attended The St. John's Methodist College and Mount Allison University, where she was trained to be a teacher. She was also a social activist who worked to found a teachers school and a maternity hospital. She was elected in 1930 in a by-election and lost her seat in 1932.

She had 7 children with her husband Richard. One of her sons, also named Richard, served in the Canadian Army during World War II and died in 1942 during a tank training manoeuvre in England.

When Newfoundland joined Confederation in 1949, Lady Squires was elected the first president of the provincial Liberal Association, a position she held until 1958. She died in 1959 at her retirement home in Toronto.

== See also ==
- Women's Suffrage in Newfoundland
