= Walter Skanes =

Newfoundland politician (1896–1961)

Walter Skanes MHA
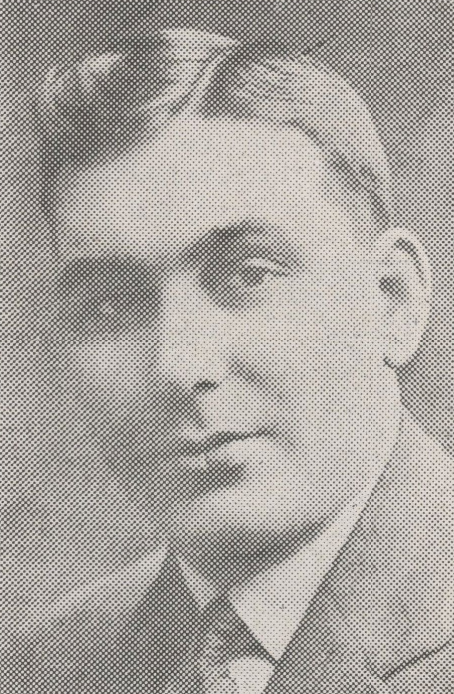
- Skanes in 1930

Member of the Newfoundland House of Assembly for St. Barbe
- In office October 29, 1928 – June 11, 1932
- Preceded by: J. H. Scammell
- Succeeded by: George Whitely

Personal details
- Born: Walter Roland Vallance Skanes; April 3, 1896 Trout River, Newfoundland Colony
- Died: November 3, 1961 (aged 65) St. John's, Newfoundland, Canada
- Party: Liberal
- Spouse: May Roberts (m. 1926)
- Children: 3
- Occupation: Mail clerk, civil servant

Walter Roland Vallance Skanes (April 3, 1896 – November 3, 1961) was a fisherman, oil worker, civil servant and political figure in Newfoundland. He represented St. Barbe in the Dominion of Newfoundland legislature from 1928 to 1932 as a Liberal.

== Biography ==
Skanes was born in Trout River as the son of Francis Skanes and Diana Payne. He was educated at Bonne Bay. In 1920, he became a travelling mail clerk. Skanes married May Roberts in 1926. After retiring from politics in 1932, he was employed in the civil service and private companies. He died in St. John's at the age of 65.
