= John M. Tobin (politician) =

Canadian politician and athlete (1885-1956)

- Born: October 25, 1885; St. John's, Newfoundland, British Empire
- Died: October 5, 1956 (aged 70); St. John's, Newfoundland, Canada

John M. Tobin (October 25, 1885 – October 5, 1956) was an athlete and politician in Newfoundland. He represented St. John's East Extern in the Newfoundland House of Assembly from 1928 to 1932.

The son of James Tobin, he was born in St. John's and was educated at Saint Bonaventure's College, St. Francis Xavier University and Loyola College in Montreal, Quebec. Tobin placed hockey with the Victorias and the Terra Novas. He also coached hockey and later was a hockey referee. Tobin served 50 years as secretary of the Newfoundland Hockey League. He also competed in the Royal St. John's Regatta and coached teams in that event. Tobin was elected to the Newfoundland assembly in 1928. He served on St. John's City Council as an alderman from 1937 to 1941. Tobin hosted a radio program about hockey during the 1940s. He died in St. John's at the age of 61.

== Tobin Tie Cup ==
John donated a Tie Cup to the St. John's Senior Hockey League in 1939. The Tobin Tie Cup was presented to the winner of the senior league playoff series between the top four teams after the regular season.

== Hall of Famer ==
Tobin was inducted into the Newfoundland and Labrador Sports Hall of Fame in 1977. He was named to the Hall of Fame for the Royal St. John's Regatta in 1990.
