= William Abbott (Newfoundland politician) =

Newfoundland politician (1888–1974)

William Abbott MHA

Member of the Newfoundland House of Assembly for St. George's-Port au Port Port au Port (1928–1932)
- In office October 29, 1928 – February 16, 1934
- Preceded by: Thomas Power (as MHA for St. George's)
- Succeeded by: William Keough (post-Confederation)

Personal details
- Born: February 18, 1888 Marches Point, Newfoundland Colony
- Died: December 21, 1974 (aged 86) Stephenville, Newfoundland, Canada
- Party: Liberal-Conservative Progressive (1928–1932); United Newfoundland (1932–1934)
- Occupation: Merchant

William Henry Abbott (February 18, 1888 – December 21, 1974) was a merchant and politician in the Dominion of Newfoundland. He represented Port au Port in the Newfoundland House of Assembly from 1928 to 1934 as a Conservative and then United Newfoundland Party member.

He was born in Marches Point, Cape St. George and was educated at Saint Bonaventure's College in St. John's. In 1903, he joined the family business, Abbott and Haliburton. Abbott was elected to the Newfoundland assembly in 1928 and reelected in 1932. He was government representative on the board of directors of the International Pulp and Paper Co. and served on the board of governors for the Newfoundland Broadcasting Company from 1939 to 1949.

Abbott died in Stephenville at the age of 86.
