= Joseph Strong (politician) =

Canadian politician

Joseph Adolphus Strong (January 5, 1878 – c. 1967) was a politician in Newfoundland. He represented White Bay in the Newfoundland House of Assembly from 1928 to 1932.

He was born in Little Bay Islands on Notre Dame Bay and worked as outside manager for a fish & supply business operating on Newfoundland's northeast coast and in Labrador. He was elected to the Newfoundland assembly as a Liberal in 1928 but was defeated when he ran for reelection in 1932.

Strong was a cousin of Helena Squires.
