= James J. Bindon =

Newfoundland politician

James J. Bindon (April 6, 1884 – November 14 1938) was a businessman and politician in Newfoundland. He represented St. Mary's in the Newfoundland and Labrador House of Assembly from 1928 to 1932 as a Liberal.

The son of John Bindon, he was born in Flatrock and was educated at St. Patrick's Hall. Bindon was employed by Royal Stores Ltd. in St. John's and Placentia. In 1909, he opened his own business in Placentia, later moving to St. John's. He ran unsuccessfully for a seat in the Newfoundland assembly in 1923 and 1924. Bindon served on the Executive Council as Minister of Finance and Customs in 1932.

He died in St. John's at the age of 54.
