= William Earle (Newfoundland politician) =

Canadian politician

William Earle (September 2, 1884 – November 25, 1968) was a paper mill worker and politician in Newfoundland. He represented Grand Falls in the Newfoundland House of Assembly from 1928 to 1932 as a Liberal.

He was born in Bay Roberts and moved to Grand Falls to work at the paper mill around the end of 1913. In 1925, Earle attempted to establish the Newfoundland Federation of Labour. He was elected to the Newfoundland assembly in 1928 but was defeated when he ran for reelection in 1932. After his defeat, he returned to work at the mill. Earle retired in the early 1950s. He died in Grand Falls at the age of 84.
