= Frank C. Archibald (Newfoundland politician) =

Canadian politician

Frank C. Archibald (1887 – January 15, 1972) was a businessman and politician in Newfoundland. He represented Harbour Grace from 1919 to 1923 and from 1928 to 1932 in the legislature of the Dominion of Newfoundland as a Liberal.

He was born in Harbour Grace, was educated there and entered the family business. Archibald ran unsuccessfully for reelection in 1923 as a member of the Liberal-Labour-Progressive party. He was named Minister of Marine and Fishery in the cabinet of Albert Hickman in 1924 but resigned after he was defeated in the 1924 general election. Elected in 1928 as a Liberal, he was defeated when he ran for reelection in 1932. After he retired from politics, Archibald managed an inn in Harbour Grace with his sister.
