= Edwin J. Godden =

Newfoundland politician (1888–1979)

Edwin J. Godden MHA
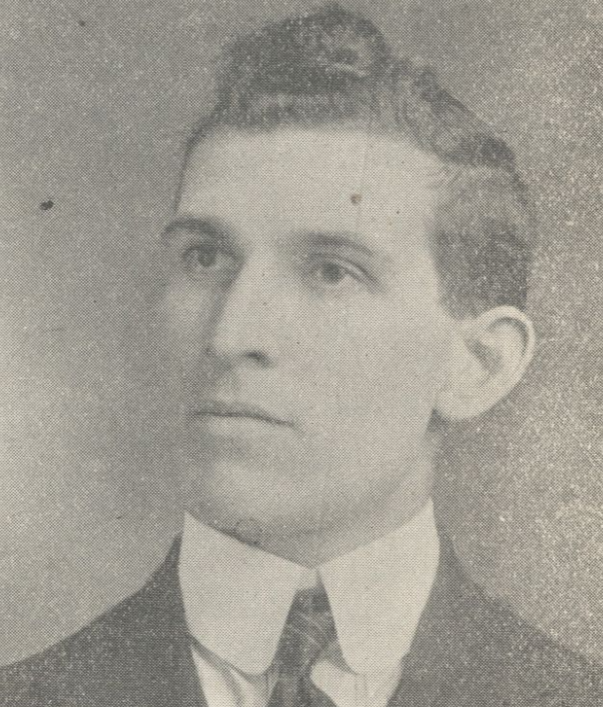
- Godden in 1927

Member of the Newfoundland House of Assembly for Trinity South Trinity Bay (1924–1928)
- In office June 2, 1924 – June 11, 1932 Serving with William Halfyard and Isaac Randell (1924–1928)
- Preceded by: Richard Hibbs
- Succeeded by: Harold Mitchell

Personal details
- Born: Edwin John Godden; June 27, 1889 Coggeshall, Essex, England, U.K.
- Died: December 18, 1979 (aged 91) St. John's, Newfoundland, Canada
- Party: Liberal
- Spouse: Gertrude Dawe (m. 1921)
- Children: 4
- Relatives: Henry Dawe (father-in-law)
- Occupation: Businessman

Edwin John Godden (June 27, 1888 – December 18, 1979) was an English-born businessman and political figure in Newfoundland. He represented Trinity Bay and then Trinity South in the Newfoundland and Labrador House of Assembly from 1924 to 1932 as a Liberal.

The son of George Godden, he was born in Coggeshall, Essex and educated in Colchester. Godden worked in England for three years, coming to Newfoundland in 1909. He first worked as an apprentice with George Knowling Limited, opening his own company in 1918. He lived in St. John's. Godden was a director for East End Stores Ltd., Goodyear House Ltd. and the Cape St. George Mining Company. He represented the government on the board of directors of the International Power and Paper Company in Corner Brook. Godden retired from politics in 1932.

In 1921, he married Gertrude Dawe, daughter of former MHA Henry Dawe. He died in St. John's at the age of 91.
