= Frank Bennett (politician) =

Newfoundland politician

Frank Bennett (February 19, 1895 – November 11, 1946) was a business manager and politician in Newfoundland. He represented St. John's West Extern in the Newfoundland House of Assembly from 1928 to 1932.

The son of Sir John Robert Bennett and Laura Jane Taylor, he was born in St. John's and was educated at Bishop Feild College and St. Andrew's College in Toronto. In 1912, he began work with Gaden's Ltd., a business owned by his father. Bennett served with the Royal Newfoundland Regiment from 1914 to 1916. After the war, he became managing director of Gaden's Aerated Water Co. Ltd. Bennett was elected to the Newfoundland assembly in 1928.

In 1923, he married Nina Louise Crosbie. Bennett was also a director of the Hawkes Bay Trading Company and of the Marine Agencies Limited. He died in St. John's at the age of 51.
