= Fishermen's Protective Union =

Newfoundland political party and service organization

- Banner and flag

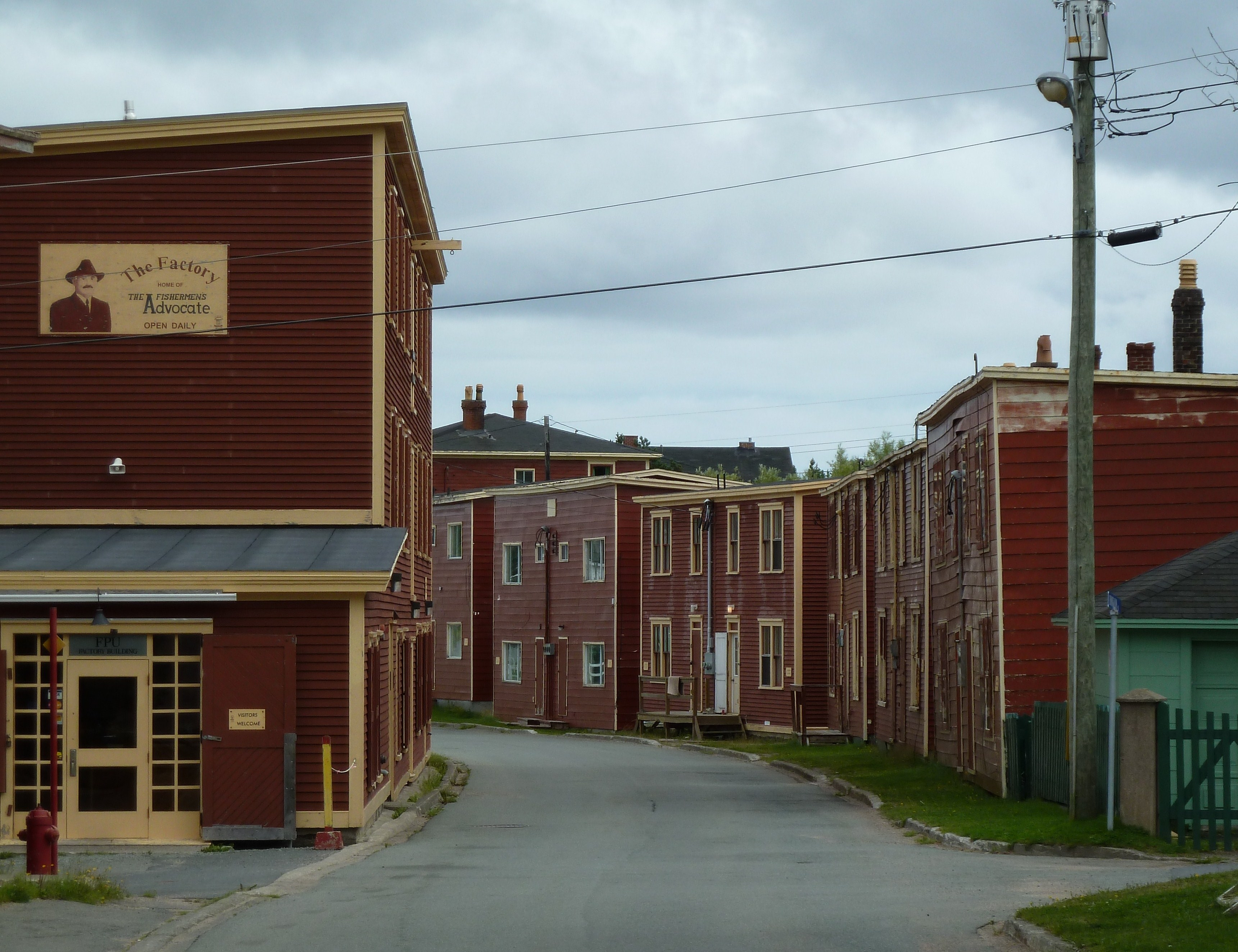
- Port Union factory building
- Abbreviation: FPU
- Established: November 3, 1908; 117 years ago
- Founder: William Coaker
- Founded at: Herring Neck
- Dissolved: 1977; 49 years ago
- Type: Cooperative, trade union, & political party
- Location: Dominion of Newfoundland
- Products: Salt cod
- Key people: Kenneth M. Brown, Charles Granger, & Harris M. Mosdell,
- Publication: The Fishermen's Advocate
- Subsidiaries: Union Party, Fishermen's Union Trading Co.

The Fishermen's Protective Union (sometimes called the Fisherman's Protective Union, the FPU, The Union or the Union Party) was a workers' organisation and political party in the Dominion of Newfoundland. The development of the FPU mirrored that of the United Farmers movement in parts of Canada.

== Origins and purpose ==
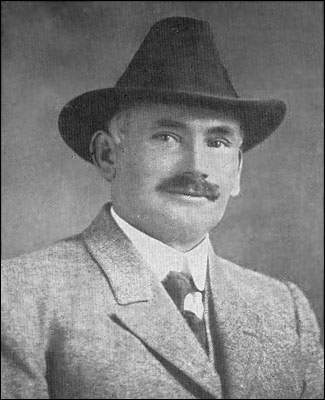
William Coaker

The FPU was founded on 3 November 1908 by William Coaker and nineteen men following a speech by him at the Orange Hall in Herring Neck as a cooperative movement for fishermen on the northeast coast of Newfoundland. It was the first serious attempt to organise fishermen as a mass political movement along class lines. With a rallying cry of "to each his own" the FPU sought to achieve reforms in Newfoundland society to attain an equitable distribution of wealth in the fishing industry. At its peak, it had more than 21,000 members in 206 councils across the island; more than half of Newfoundland's roughly 40,000 fishermen.

The FPU set up the Fishermen's Union Trading Co. (UTC or FUTC), which established stores throughout the province that would purchase fish from fishermen for cash. It would also import goods to sell to fishermen directly at a non-inflated price. This circumvented the St. John's fish merchants. Previously, merchants did not pay cash for fish but advanced fishermen staple goods at an inflated price on credit and then took the fishermen's cured fish at the end of the season at rates determined by the merchant. This Truck system kept most fishermen in perpetual debt to the merchant.

The FPU's newspaper, "The Fishermen's Advocate", was founded in 1910 and ceased publication in 1980. From 1914 to 1924, the Advocate was published in both daily and weekly editions, and for a short time in 1917, had three editions, evening, morning, and weekly. It published as a weekly from 1914 to 1980.

== Electoral Politics ==
The FPU believed that the interests of fishermen were being ignored by the mainstream parties, and that candidates elected on a class basis would be able to hold the balance of power and influence government in the interests of fishermen. As early as 1910, the FPU began to lay the groundwork for a formal entry into parliamentary politics. In the next few years, Coaker toured the country, enlisting members, helping start new councils, and rallying support for the FPU's eventual entry into politics.

=== The Bonavista Platform ===
In 1912, the FPU adopted the Bonavista Platform, a political manifesto calling for radical change in fishery policy, social policy and governance. Consisting of 31 planks, it advocated co-operative marketing and government regulation of fish grading. In social policy, it proposed the reduction of tariffs on staple foods, improvements to old age pensions, free and compulsory education and a minimum wage. The Platform also called for democratic reforms such as the right to recall Members of the Newfoundland House of Assembly and having a salary for elected representatives to make it feasible for those who are not independently wealthy to be involved in politics.

=== The Union Party ===
The FPU entered electoral politics in 1913 by establishing the Union Party, campaigning on the Bonavista Platform and in particular calling for government regulation of the fisheries, administrative and constitutional reform, and the extension of education and social welfare. Eight members of the FPU were elected to the House of Assembly in 1913 including Coaker himself, having won one of the three seats for the district of Bonavista. In his maiden speech to the House of Assembly, Coaker spoke of the significance of outport fishermen gaining a measure of political power. "It is not an accident we have come here," he said, "[a] revolution ... has been fought in Newfoundland. The fisherman, the toiler of Newfoundland has made up his mind that he is going to be represented on the floors of this House."

== Support and Opposition ==
From the early days of the FPU's founding, the union attracted sympathy and support in some quarters and fierce opposition in others. While the FPU was popular among many fishermen, it was deeply unpopular among merchants, the political elite, and some religious elites.

=== Relationship with Political and Business Elites ===
Coaker initially had had a warm relationship with the progressive Plaindealer newspaper and Edward Morris's People's Party, and had eschewed the Liberals, who, under Prime Minister Robert Bond had favoured limited government and retrenchment. But by the spring of 1909, he had incurred the enmity of the Plaindealer's editors and financiers, and over time the FPU shifted its support toward the Liberals.

The FPU was the target of heated rhetoric throughout much of its history, particularly in its early years. Journalists, parliamentarians and others attacked the union for attempting to undermine duly constituted order, for seeking to alter the inexorable law of supply and demand, or being "godless." Later, attacks on the FPU came in the form of attempts to associate it with the Bolshevik Revolution and Marxism. However, the acrimony between the FPU and Newfoundland's elites went both ways. One notable event in FPU history was its protests and petitions to arrest Abram Keanfor his role in the sealing disasters of 1914.

=== Where the FPU was inactive ===
The FPU was also mostly a non-factor in some areas of the country, including St. John's. While a United Trading Company store existed in the capital city, no local council did. The FPU did not seek to extend its influence or mandate to cover other members of the broader working class, though occasionally fishers or sealers held rallies in the city and sometimes received the support of locals.

Moreover, the FPU's decision to limit the union's political influence to a balance of power strategy limited any impulse there might have been to extend its influence further. As Coaker said of the Union Party, "No effort will be made to control public affairs... The Union [members] don’t want to rule..." This meant that even some fishing areas of the country, such as the southwest coast, were deprioritized and tended not to have many councils or UTC stores. This was partly because such fishers were involved in the inshore fishery, which was less conducive to or receptive of the union idea.

=== Relationship with Roman Catholics ===
The union had Protestant and Catholic supporters, but retained the bulk of its support from Newfoundland's Protestant fishers in the northeast of the island. It was distrusted and opposed by some elements within the Roman Catholic Church, including Archbishop M.F. Howley of St. John's and his successor, Archbishop E.P. Roche, who varyingly took issue with the union's links with the Orange Order, the initial requirement that members swear an oath of secrecy, its unionism, its alleged socialism and atheism, its decision to enter politics, and its perceived threat to the "feudal and paternal system" that had structured outport life.

The church's hostility initially discouraged the continuation of FPU locals in Catholic areas of the southern Avalon Peninsula, such as those in Argentia, Salmonier, Riverhead and Trepassey. Yet other Catholic officials, including the Bishop of St. George's, Neil McNeil, permitted Catholic membership in the union. Several parish priests, such as those in Tilting, were either permissive or supportive of Catholic membership in the union, and Catholic schools and community halls were often opened up to receive Coaker and FPU candidates during tours and election campaigns.

By late 1909, the Church quietly dropped its ban on Catholic membership in the union, partly due to these fissures within the church, pressure from lay Catholic fishers, and the FPU's elimination of the oath of secrecy. Catholic councils that had previously folded in Salmonier and Riverhead were reconstituted, and new FPU locals formed in heavily Catholic towns such as Branch, North Harbour, Witless Bay, and Petty Harbour. Coaker estimated that the union had 1,200 Catholic supporters in northern districts. The vice-president of the union, Andrew Broaders, was a Catholic from Bay de Verde, and during the acrimonious election of 1913, pressed the case that Catholics could belong in the union.

== Years in Office ==
The election held on 30 October 1913, launched a new chapter in the history of the FPU as it started to make political gains. However, within a year of their inaugural election, the Union Party's agenda was waylaid by the onset of the First World War.

=== The First World War Years ===
FPU members of the House of Assembly joined Edward Patrick Morris' wartime National Government of 1917 with Coaker as minister of fisheries. The FPU's reputation was hurt, however, by its support of the government's conscription policy which was unpopular in Newfoundland's outport fishing villages, particularly as by taking their sons overseas it hurt the ability of fishing families to earn enough to support themselves. Coaker had promised that there would be no conscription without a referendum but he and the FPU ended up supporting the government's decision to implement the measure without a vote resulting in some FPU council's passing resolutions to censure Coaker.

=== The Post-WWI Years ===
In 1919, the FPU joined with the Liberal Party of Newfoundland led by Richard Squires to form the Liberal Reform Party. The Liberal-Union coalition won 24 of 36 seats in the 1919 general election with half of the coalition's seats being won by Union candidates. Coaker was appointed Fisheries Minister and attempted to introduce regulations to control the prices of fish exported abroad but the rules were too weak and failed in its goal of preventing Newfoundland's exporters from undercutting each other.

The fishery declined in the 1920s, causing high unemployment, falling fish prices and emigration from the island. The influence of the FPU subsequently declined and it withdrew from electoral politics in 1924 though it attempted a return in the 1928 election winning 9 seats and becoming a junior partner in the government of Frederick C. Alderdice with much less influence then it enjoyed a decade earlier. Coaker became minister without portfolio and again attempted to pass reforms to the fishing industry but was not successful. The downward economic spiral caused by the decline of the fishing industry was aggravated further by the Great Depression resulting in the collapse of responsible government in 1934 and the implementation of direct rule from Britain via the Commission of Government.

Coaker resigned as FPU president in 1923 but retained his position as leader of the Fishermen's Union Trading Company.

== Decline ==
The FPU's political role ended entirely with the suspension of responsible government in 1934 (which Coaker supported). The union became a service organisation for its members, running businesses and its activities on behalf of fishermen and loggers. The FPU survived into the post-confederation period when democratic politics resumed in 1949 though it ran no candidates and had faded away by 1960. The Fishermen's Union Trading Co. survived until 1977 when it fell into receivership resulting in its ten remaining stores being sold.

== Legacy ==
In 1999, the town founded by the FPU, Port Union, was designated a National Historic Site of Canada as the only town in Canada to have been established by a union.

== Song ==
The original anthem of the FPU was titled "We are Coming Mr. Coaker" which was sung or chanted at FPU meetings to show support for Coaker and his movement to unite the fishermen. The author of the work is unknown. The source of the tune has been identified as the American Civil War song "We Are Coming, Father Abraham, Three Hundred Thousand More", a call to arms written in 1862 by James Sloan Gibbons.

We are coming, Mr. Coaker, from the East, West, North and South;
You have called us and we're coming, for to put our foes to rout.
By merchants and by governments, too long we've been misruled;
We're determined now in future, and no longer we'll be fooled.
We'll be brothers all and free men, we'll be brothers all and free men,
We'll be brothers all and free men, and we'll rightify each wrong;
We are coming, Mr. Coaker, we are coming, Mr. Coaker,
We are coming, Mr. Coaker, and we're forty thousand strong.
We are coming, Mr. Coaker, men from Green Bay's rocky shore,
Men who stand the snow-white billows down on stormy Labrador.
We are ready and awaiting, strong and solid, firm and bold,
To be led by you like Moses led the Israelites of old.
We are ready for to sever, we are ready for to sever,
We are ready for to sever, from the merchants' servile throng;
We are coming, Mr. Coaker, we are coming, Mr. Coaker,
We are coming, Mr. Coaker, and we're forty thousand strong.
We are coming, Mr. Coaker, blood of Saxon and of Celt,
You arouse a feeling in us, that before we never felt;
Valiant men from far Placentia, who the angry oceans brave,
They are with you heart and spirit, breasting Cape St. Mary's waves.
They are with the fight for freedom, they are with the fight for freedom,
They are with the fight for freedom, and the Union is their song;
We are coming, Mr. Coaker, we are coming, Mr. Coaker,
We are coming, Mr. Coaker, and we're forty thousand strong.

An additional verse was added to the song during the 1990s when Port Union was being brushed up to be a heritage site.

We're still people, Mr. Coaker, with a spirit strong and true;
We will follow in your footsteps, and we know just what to do.
We'll rebuild the town you dreamed of, and we will not back away;
For we're looking to our future, that began just yesterday.
Will we perish? We'll say NEVER! Will we perish? We'll say NEVER!
Will we perish? We'll say NEVER! Port Union's here to stay;
We are coming, Mr. Coaker, we are coming, Mr. Coaker,
We are coming, Mr. Coaker, and we're forty thousand strong.

== Leaders ==
- William Coaker, 1908–1923
- J.H. Scammell, 1923–1934
- K.M. Brown, 1934–1948
- C.R. Granger, 1948–1954
- Gilbert Yetman, 1954–1960

== See also ==
- List of political parties in Newfoundland and Labrador
- General elections in Newfoundland (pre-Confederation)
- Fish, Food and Allied Workers Union
