= John Charles Puddester =

Newfoundland politician (1881–1947)

The Honourable Sir John C. Puddester MHA
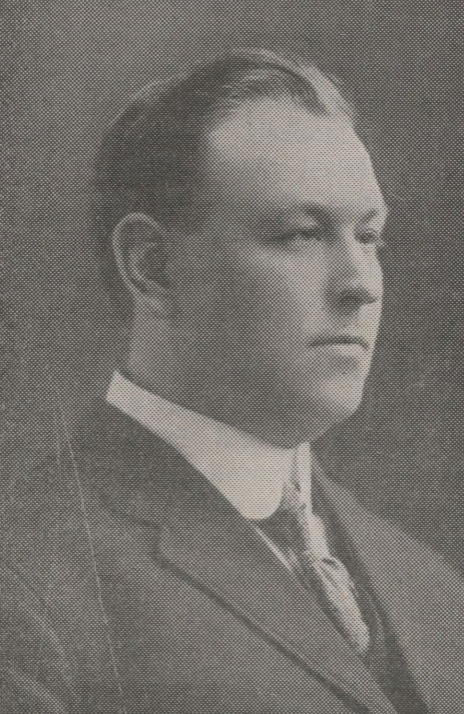
- Puddester in 1927

Vice-Chairman of the Commission of Government
- In office 1938 – April 27, 1947
- Preceded by: William R. Howley
- Succeeded by: Office abolished

Commissioner for Public Welfare
- In office February 16, 1934 – April 27, 1947
- Preceded by: Office established
- Succeeded by: Herbert Pottle

Secretary of State
- In office 1932 – February 16, 1934
- Prime Minister: Frederick C. Alderdice
- Preceded by: Arthur Barnes (as Colonial Secretary)
- Succeeded by: Frederick C. Alderdice (as Vice-Chairman)

Member of the Newfoundland House of Assembly for Carbonear-Bay de Verde Bay de Verde (1924–1932)
- In office June 2, 1924 – February 16, 1934 Serving with Richard Cramm (1924–1928)
- Preceded by: William H. Cave
- Succeeded by: Herbert Pottle (post-Confederation)

Personal details
- Born: John Charles Puddester; October 4, 1881 Northern Bay, Newfoundland Colony
- Died: 27 April 1947 (aged 65) Carbonear, Newfoundland
- Party: Liberal-Conservative Progressive (1924–1932); United Newfoundland Party (1932–1934)
- Spouse: Mary Moores
- Children: 9
- Occupation: Businessman, accountant

Sir John Charles Puddester (4 October 1881 – 22 April 1947) was a businessman and political figure in Newfoundland. He represented Bay de Verde from 1924 to 1932 and Carbonear-Bay de Verde from 1932 to 1934. Puddester was then appointed to the Commission of Government, serving until his death in 1947.

== Early life and career ==
Puddester was born in Northern Bay, the son of Mark Puddester and Sarah Sellers. Puddester married Mary Moores and had nine children.

After teaching school from 1899 to 1903, he became an accountant with the Reid Newfoundland Company, working there until 1916. From 1916 to 1932, he was business manager for the St. John's Daily News.

== Politics ==
Puddester first attempted to enter House of Assembly by running as a Conservative candidate for the district of Bay de Verde in 1923. Although he was defeated, he was elected when another election was called the following year. He served in the Executive Council as the Secretary of State.

After the House of Assembly voted to abolish itself and suspend responsible government, Puddester was appointed to the Commission of Government as the Commissioner of Public Health and Welfare before becoming its Vice-Chairman in 1938. In the 1930s and 1940s, Puddester initiated a program to transcribe parish baptism and marriage records dating from the period before civil registration began in 1891.

Puddester was knighted in 1939. He died in St. John's in 1947.
