= Harris M. Mosdell =

Newfoundland politician

The Honourable Harris M. Mosdell MLC MHA
- Mosdell in 1927

Minister without portfolio
- In office 1928–1932
- Prime Minister: Richard Squires

Member of the Legislative Council of Newfoundland
- In office April 18, 1922 – 1926
- Nominated by: Richard Squires
- Appointed by: Charles Alexander Harris

Member of the Newfoundland House of Assembly for Fortune Bay-Hermitage Fortune Bay (1926–1932)
- In office October 25, 1926 – February 16, 1934
- Preceded by: William Warren
- Succeeded by: John R. Courage (post-Confederation)

Personal details
- Born: Harris Munden Mosdell; June 27, 1883 Bay Roberts, Newfoundland Colony
- Died: April 30, 1944 (aged 60) Riverdale, Newfoundland
- Party: Fishermen's Protective Union (1914–1926); Liberal (1926–1932); Independent (1932–1934)
- Spouse: Bessie Mundy (m. 1911)
- Children: 2
- Education: University of Toronto (M.B.)
- Occupation: Doctor, newspaper editor, school teacher

Harris Munden Mosdell (June 27, 1883 – April 30, 1944) was a journalist, physician and political figure in Newfoundland. He represented Fortune Bay and then Fortune Bay-Hermitage in the Newfoundland and Labrador House of Assembly from 1926 to 1934 as a Liberal and then Independent member.

== Early life and career ==
Mosdell was born on June 27, 1883 in Bay Roberts, the son of Thomas Mosdell and Susannah Munden (née Way). After graduating from the local schools, Mosdell taught school for several years before purchasing a printing plant and establishing a newspaper, the Outlook, in Bay Roberts. He moved to Toronto in 1909 where he became a reporter and also studied medicine. After receiving a Bachelor of Medicine, he returned to Newfoundland in 1911 and began the practice of medicine at Woody Point.

== Politics ==
Mosdell became the editor of the Fishermen's Protective Union newspapers, the Fisherman's Advocate and the Daily Mail in 1914, later becoming editor of the Liberal Daily Star. Mosdell was named to the Legislative Council of Newfoundland in 1922. He resigned from the council in 1926 to run in a by-election for a seat in the Newfoundland assembly. He served in the Executive Council as a minister without portfolio. In 1930, he received an M.D. In 1934, he was named secretary in the Department of Public Health and Welfare. Mosdell married Bessie Mundy.
