= Newfoundland Commission of Government =

1934–1949 government of the Dominion of Newfoundland

The Commission of Government was a non-elected body that governed the Dominion of Newfoundland from 1934 to 1949. Established following the collapse of Newfoundland's economy during the Great Depression, it was dissolved when the dominion became the tenth province of Canada on March 31, 1949. It was composed of civil servants who were directly subordinate to the British Government in London.

== Background ==
Newfoundland's economic difficulties were exacerbated by debt incurred during the First World War and the collapse of fish prices during the Depression. In 1933, following a prolonged period of economic crisis and severe budgetary deficit, and civil unrest culminating in a riot which brought down the previous government, the government of Prime Minister Frederick C. Alderdice asked the British and Canadian governments to establish a royal commission (the Newfoundland Royal Commission) to investigate the dominion's continuing crisis and to suggest a solution to its problems.

The commission (commonly known as the "Amulree Commission") was chaired by Lord Amulree, appointed by the British government, and also included Charles Alexander Magrath, appointed by the Canadian government, and Sir William Ewen Stavert, who represented the Newfoundland government.

The commission recommended the temporary suspension of responsible government in Newfoundland, and replacing it with a Commission of Government made up of the British-appointed Governor and six commissioners appointed by the Crown made up of three British officials and three Newfoundland-born appointees.

Alderdice was in favour of this recommendation and accordingly put it to the House of Assembly, which duly approved the proposals and thus voted itself out of existence.

== Governance by the Commission ==
The Commission of Government was sworn in on 16 February 1934, with Alderdice as vice-chairman, and immediately set about reforming the administration of the country in hopes of balancing the government's budget. With the help of grants in aid from the United Kingdom, the Commission attempted to encourage agriculture and reorganize the fishing industry. While it did much to expand government health services to rural areas, for example, it could not solve the basic economic problems of a small export-oriented country during a time of worldwide economic stagnation.

American and Canadian military spending in Newfoundland during the 1940s caused an economic boom and allowed the Commission of Government to consider how to reintroduce a system of democratic government. However, the British government believed that wartime prosperity would be short-lived. So it established the Newfoundland National Convention in 1946 to debate constitutional options, which were submitted to the people in two referendums in 1948. By a slender majority, Newfoundlanders chose to become a province of Canada, rather than return to the status of a self-governing dominion. The Commission of Government continued to govern Newfoundland until March 31, 1949, when Newfoundland joined Canada.

== Chairmen of Commission of Government ==
Term	Chairman
1934–1935	Sir David Murray Anderson
1936–1946	Sir Humphrey T. Walwyn
1946–1949	Sir Gordon MacDonald

== Members of the Commission of Government ==
Name	From	To	Role
Frederick Charles Alderdice	16 February 1934	1936	Commissioner for Home Affairs and Education, Vice Chairman 1934-1936
Sir John Hope Simpson	16 February 1934	1936	Commissioner of Natural Resources and Acting-Commissioner of Justice
William Richard Howley	16 February 1934	1937	Commissioner for Justice and Attorney General 1934-1937; Vice-Chairman 1936-1937
Thomas Lodge	16 February 1934	1937	Commissioner of Public Utilities
John Charles Puddester (knighted in 1939)	16 February 1934	1947	Commissioner of Public Health and Welfare; Vice-Chairman 1938-1947
Everard Noel Rye Trentham	16 February 1934	1937	Commissioner of Finance
James Alexander Winter	20 April 1936	1941	Commissioner of Home Affairs and Education
Robert Benson Ewbank	28 July 1936	1939	Commissioner of Natural Resources
Sir Wilfrid Wentworth Woods	15 January 1937	1944	Commissioner of Public Utilities
John Hubert Penson	10 May 1937	1941	Commissioner of Finance
Lewis Edward Emerson (knighted in 1944)	15 September 1937	1944	Commissioner of Justice and Attorney General 1937-1940, Commissioner of Defence 1940-1944
John Henry Gorvin	31 May 1939	1941	Commissioner of Natural Resources
Ira Wild	16 February 1941	1946	Commissioner of Finance
Peter Douglas Hay Dunn	30 June 1941	1945	Commissioner of Natural Resources
Harry Anderson Winter	20 May 1941	1947	Commissioner of Home Affairs and Education 1941-1944, Commissioner of Justice and Commissioner of Defence 1944-1947
Sir George Ernest London	5 September 1944	1945	Commissioner of Public Utilities
Albert Joseph Walsh (knighted in 1949)	5 September 1944	1949	Commissioner of Home Affairs and Education 1944-1949, Commissioner of Defence 1947-1949
James Scott Neill	28 September 1945	1949	Commissioner for Public Utilities and Supply
William Henry Flinn	28 September 1945	1949	Commissioner of Natural Resources
Richard Lewis Malcolm James	12 September 1946	1949	Commissioner of Finance
Herman William Quinton	1 January 1947	1949	Commissioner of Public Health and Welfare 1947-1949
Herbert Lench Pottle	19 September 1947	1949	Commissioner for Public Welfare

== See also ==
- List of Newfoundland Prime Ministers
- Newfoundland Royal Commission
