= Jack Henry Scammell =

Newfoundland politician (1894–1940)

J. H. Scammell MHA
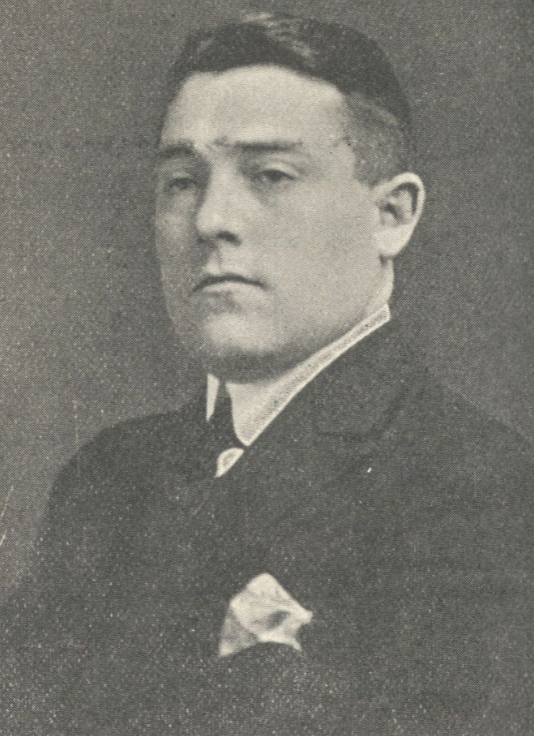

President of the Fishermen's Protective Union
- In office February 3, 1926 – November 16, 1934
- Preceded by: William Coaker
- Succeeded by: Kenneth M. Brown

Member of the Newfoundland House of Assembly for Bonavista Centre
- In office October 29, 1928 – June 11, 1932
- Preceded by: District established
- Succeeded by: District abolished

Member of the Newfoundland House of Assembly for St. Barbe
- In office November 3, 1919 – October 29, 1928
- Preceded by: William M. Clapp
- Succeeded by: Walter Skanes

Personal details
- Born: John Henry Scammell; July 11, 1894 Change Islands, Newfoundland Colony
- Died: September 18, 1940 (aged 46) St. John's, Newfoundland
- Party: Fishermen's Protective Union
- Education: Bishop Feild College
- Occupation: Teacher

John Henry Scammell (July 11, 1894 – September 18, 1940) was an educator, journalist and political figure in the Dominion of Newfoundland. He represented St. Barbe from 1919 to 1928 and Bonavista Centre from 1928 to 1932 in the Newfoundland and Labrador House of Assembly.

== Early life and education ==
He was born in Change Islands, Colony of Newfoundland, and the son of Arthur Scammell and Althea Jones. He gained his education at Bishop Feild College and at the teacher's summer school in St. John's. Scammell was the principal of the Boys' Central Training School in St. John's and taught in Bishop Feild College.

== Politics and later life ==
In 1916, he became a private secretary to William Coaker. He succeeded Coaker as the president of the Fishermen's Protective Union in 1926, serving in that position until 1936. In 1929, Scammell became the editor of the Fishermen's Advocate. He died of a stroke at a hospital in Bonavista at the age of 46 and was buried in Change Islands.
