= Robert Smith (Newfoundland politician) =

Canadian politician

Robert J. Smith (October 1879 – February 4, 1972) was a merchant and politician in Newfoundland. He represented Port de Grave in the Newfoundland House of Assembly from 1928 to 1932.

He was born in Cupids. Smith was a general merchant and coal dealer in Cupids. He was elected to the Newfoundland assembly in 1928. He also served as secretary of the Public Health Commission, Smith died in St. John's at the age of 82.
