= Joseph Fitzgibbon =

Canadian politician

Joseph Fitzgibbon (May 5, 1881 – December 17, 1960) was a politician in Newfoundland. He represented St. John's City West in the Newfoundland House of Assembly from 1928 to 1932 as a Liberal.

The son of Edmund Fitzgibbon, he was born in St. John's and was educated at St. Patrick's Hall. He worked as an auctioneer and real estate agent. In 1923, he ran unsuccessfully for a seat in the Newfoundland assembly; Fitzgibbon was unsuccessful again in 1924. He was elected to St. John's municipal council in 1925 and served as deputy mayor. He was elected to the Newfoundland assembly in 1928. Fitzgibbon was defeated when he ran for reelection in Placentia and St. Mary's in 1932. He returned to municipal politics and was elected to St. John's council three more times. From 1952 to 1953, he was president of the Newfoundland and Labrador Federation of Municipalities. Fitzgibbon was a Grand Knight in the Knights of Columbus. From 1949 until his death in 1960, he was chief returning officer for the federal St. John's West riding.

In 1910, Fitzgibbon married Pauline Kemp; the couple had eight children.

He died in St. John's at the age of 79.
