= Frederick C. Alderdice =

10th Prime Minister of Newfoundland (1928; 1932–1934)

The Right Honourable Frederick C. Alderdice MLC MHA
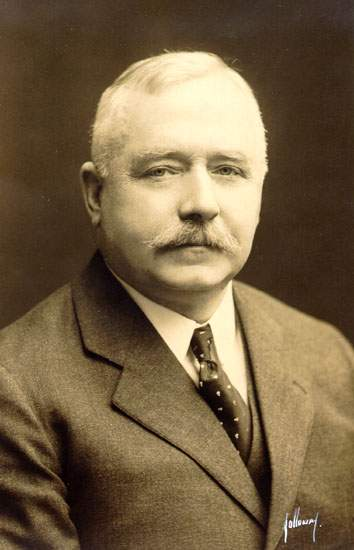
- Alderdice during his time in office

10th Prime Minister of Newfoundland
- In office June 11, 1932 – February 16, 1934
- Monarch: George V
- Governor: John Middleton; David Murray Anderson
- Preceded by: Richard Squires
- Succeeded by: Joey Smallwood (as Premier)
- In office August 15, 1928 – November 17, 1928
- Monarch: George V
- Governor: William Allardyce; John Middleton
- Preceded by: Walter Monroe
- Succeeded by: Richard Squires
Commission offices
Vice Chairman of the Commission of Government
In office February 16, 1934 – February 26, 1936
Preceded by	Office established
Succeeded by	William R. Howley
Commissioner for Home Affairs and Education
In office February 16, 1934 – February 26, 1936
Preceded by	Office established
Succeeded by	James A. Winter
Legislative offices
Member of the Newfoundland House of Assembly for St. John's West
In office June 11, 1932 – February 16, 1934 Serving with Patrick F. Halley
Preceded by	Alexander Campbell; Joseph Fitzgibbon (as MHAs for St. John's City West); Frank Bennett (as MHA for St. John's West Extern)
Succeeded by	Oliver Vardy (post-Confederation); James Spratt (post-Confederation)
Member of the Newfoundland House of Assembly for St. John's City East
In office October 29, 1928 – June 11, 1932 Serving with Gerald G. Byrne
Preceded by	William J. Higgins; Cyril J. Fox (as MHAs for St. John's East)
Succeeded by	Lewis Edward Emerson (as MHA for St. John's East)
Member of the Legislative Council of Newfoundland
In office March 24, 1925 – August 15, 1928
Nominated by	Walter Monroe
Appointed by	William Allardyce

Personal details
- Born: November 10, 1871 Belfast, Ireland, United Kingdom
- Died: February 26, 1936 (aged 64) St. John's, Newfoundland
- Party: Liberal-Conservative Progressive (1928–1932); United Newfoundland Party (1932–1934)
- Spouse: Harriet Carter (m. 1900)
- Children: 4
- Relatives: John Monroe (uncle); Moses Monroe (uncle); Walter Monroe (cousin)
- Education: Methodist College Belfast
- Occupation: Businessman

Frederick Charles Munro Alderdice (November 10, 1871 – February 26, 1936) was a Newfoundland businessman, politician and the last Prime Minister of Newfoundland.

== Early life and family ==
Alderdice was born at Rose Cottage in Stranmillis, Belfast, Ireland to William Alderdice and Rachael Kathleen Alderdice (née Monroe). After graduating from Methodist College Belfast, he moved to Newfoundland in 1886 to work as a cashier for his uncle Moses Monroe's Colonial Cordage Company. Alderdice married Harriet Carter on October 25, 1900 and they had two sons and two daughters.

Alderdice became a prominent businessman in his own right, rising through the ranks within the Colonial Cordage Company until he became its managing director in 1922 following the death of his uncle James Monroe. An active rugby player in his youth, Alderdice contracted septicemia after a sports injury and had to amputate his feet, using walking sticks to move for the rest of his life.

== Opposition leader (1928–1932) ==
Alderdice was nominated to the Legislative Council of Newfoundland in 1925 by his cousin Walter Monroe, who had recently become prime minister. He became involved in electoral politics when he succeeded Monroe as prime minister and leader of the Liberal-Conservative Progressive Party on August 15, 1928. Alderdice's first premiership was short-lived, however, as his government lost that year's general election to the Liberals led by Sir Richard Squires.

The Great Depression embroiled the dominion in a severe economic crisis which was compounded by corruption in the Squires government taking the dominion to the brink of bankruptcy. Widespread unemployment added to the crisis and resulted in an anti-government riot in St. John's on April 5, 1932. Alderdice joined with Liberals dissatisfied with Squires to form the United Newfoundland Party with himself as leader. The Squires government collapsed and Alderdice swept to power in the ensuing June election on the promise that, if elected, his government would examine the possibility of suspending the constitution and having a commission administer the country until conditions improved. His United Newfoundland Party won 24 seats to only two for the Liberals.

== Prime Minister (1932–1934) ==
The Alderdice government was unable to deal with the economic crisis and proposed a partial default on the dominion's debts. Britain and Canada (whose currency was shared by Newfoundland) agreed to give the dominion financial aid in exchange for the creation of an Imperial Royal Commission to investigate the dominion's future. The Commission recommended the suspension of responsible government and the institution of an appointed Commission of Government to rule the dominion.

Alderdice was pressured by the British to accept the recommendations without calling a new election or submitting the proposals to a referendum. Alderdice agreed and, at the end of 1933, the legislature voted to accept the recommendations and voted itself out of existence.

== Commission of Government (1934–1936) ==
Alderdice was appointed to the Commission of Government when it was established in February 1934 and served as Commissioner for Home Affairs and Education in the new Commission of Government as well as Vice-Chairman until his death in 1936.

== Death and state funeral ==
Alderdice died very suddenly on February 26, 1936, from a paralytic stroke. Alderdice's funeral was attended by thousands, esteemed members of societies, and other commission members. The procession started at his home on Rennie Mill Road and ended at St. Thomas' Church.

Political offices
Preceded by Walter Stanley Monroe	Prime Minister of Newfoundland; 1928	Succeeded by Sir Richard Squires
Preceded by Sir Richard Squires	Prime Minister of Newfoundland; 1932–1934	Succeeded by Commission of Government
