= United Newfoundland Party =

The United Newfoundland Party was the name of two conservative parties in Newfoundland.

== Pre-Confederation ==
The first UNP was a conservative party in the Dominion of Newfoundland led by Frederick C. Alderdice from 1928 to 1934. It was organized by Alderdice when disaffected Liberals joined his Liberal-Conservative Progressive Party sitting in opposition and won the 1932 general election. His government was replaced by an appointed Commission of Government in 1934. This was a change his party promised in its 1932 platform as a means of getting the Dominion out of fiscal trouble, which resulted in the termination of responsible government in the Dominion. (See also Conservative parties in Newfoundland (pre-Confederation).

== Post-Confederation ==
The second United Newfoundland Party was formed prior to the 1959 provincial election; it was composed of some Progressive Conservative Party of Newfoundland and Labrador caucus members and supporters. The party was formed immediately prior to the election when two Tory MHAs, led by James D. Higgins, supported Premier Joey Smallwood's stance in favour of Newfoundland receiving financial assistance from the federal government indefinitely. Provincial Conservative leader Malcolm Mercer Hollett supported the position of Conservative Prime Minister John Diefenbaker, who maintained that the funding agreement between the two orders of government had run its course. While two UNP MHAs were elected in 1959, Higgins was defeated. Gus Duffy succeeded Higgins as UNP leader. He sat with fellow UNP MHA John R. O'Dea, who stepped down after one term. In the 1962 provincial election, Duffy was defeated in his St. John's Centre riding. The party became defunct soon after.

== See also ==
- List of political parties in Newfoundland and Labrador
