= 1923 Newfoundland general election =

Election in the Dominion of Newfoundland

- May 3, 1923

36 seats of the Newfoundland House of Assembly 19 seats needed for a majority
- Turnout: 82.77% (▲10.08pp)
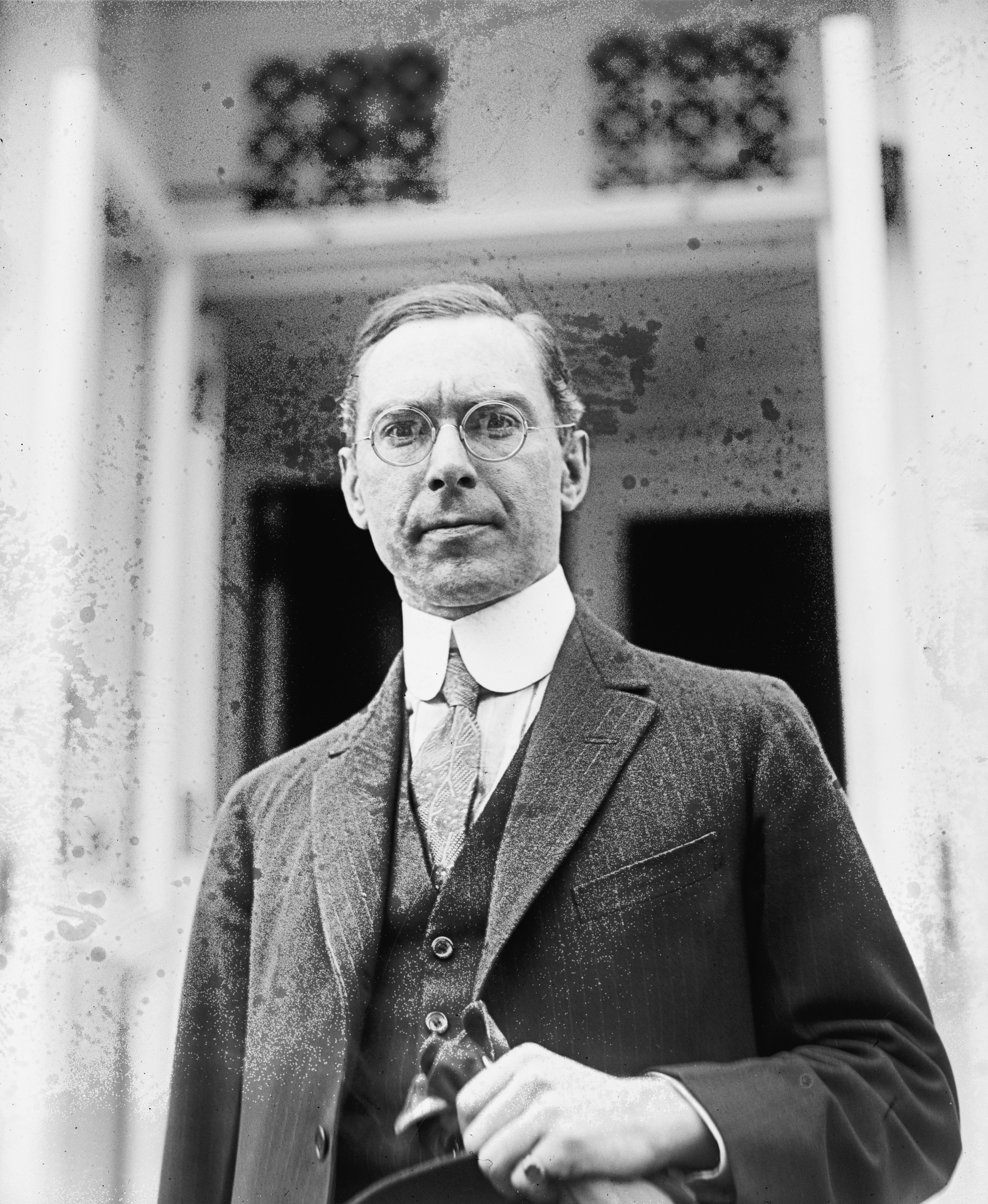

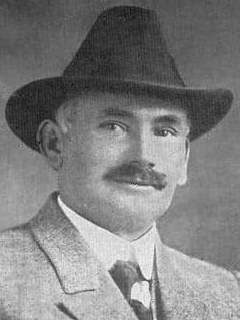

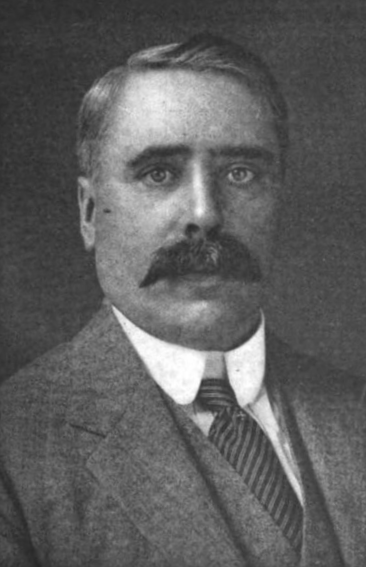
	First party	Second party
Leader	Richard Squires and William Coaker	John R. Bennett
Party	Liberal Reform	Liberal-Labour-Progressive
Leader since	1919 / 1908	1923
Leader's seat	St. John's West / Bonavista Bay	St. John's West; Ran in Harbour Grace (lost)
Last election	24 seats, 59.64%	12 seats, 36.70% (Note: As the Liberal-Progressive Party)
Seats won	23	13
Seat change	▼1	▲1
Popular vote	65,063	60,658
Percentage	51.50%	48.01%
Swing	▼8.14%	▲11.31%
- Results by district
Prime Minister before election
Richard Squires
Liberal Reform
Prime Minister after election
Richard Squires
Liberal Reform

The 1923 Newfoundland general election was held on May 3, 1923 to elect members of the 25th General Assembly of Newfoundland in the Dominion of Newfoundland. The Liberal Reform Party, an alliance between the Liberals led by Richard Squires and the Fishermen's Protective Union of William Coaker, were re-elected. The Liberal-Labour-Progressive party, led by John R. Bennett, formed the opposition. Following the election, Squires was forced to resign as prime minister in July 1923 after allegations of corruption were brought forward. William Warren, Squires' Attorney General, became Liberal Reform Party leader and Prime Minister. After Warren's government was defeated following a motion of no confidence, Albert Hickman was asked to form a government and Warren joined William J. Higgins to form the new Liberal-Conservative Progressive Party.

== Seat totals ==
Party	Leader	1919	Candidates	Seats won	Seat change	% of seats (% change)	Popular vote	% of vote (% change)
Liberal Reform	Richard Squires	24	36; Liberal 25; FPU 11	23; Liberal 12; FPU 11	▼1	63.89% (▼2.78%)	65,063; Liberal 34,105; FPU 30,958	51.50% (▼8.14%)
Fishermen's Protective Union	William Coaker	24	36; Liberal 25; FPU 11	23; Liberal 12; FPU 11	▼1	63.89% (▼2.78%)	65,063; Liberal 34,105; FPU 30,958	51.50% (▼8.14%)
Liberal-Labour-Progressive	John R. Bennett	12	36	13	▲1	36.11% (▲2.78%)	60,658	48.01% (▲11.31%)
Other		0	2	0	Steady	0.00%	627	0.50% (▼0.48%)
Totals		36	74	36	Steady	100%	126,348 (Note: This figure includes votes cast for more than one candidate in multi-member districts. A total of 53,984 individual votes were cast in this election.)	100%

== Results by district ==
- Names in **boldface type** represent party leaders.
- † indicates that the incumbent did not run again.
- ‡ indicates that the incumbent ran in a different district.

=== St. John's ===
Electoral district	Candidates			Incumbent
Electoral district	Liberal Reform	Liberal-Labour-Progressive	Other	Incumbent
St. John's East; 89.32% turnout	Joseph P. Burke; 2,595; 15.00%	William Higgins; 3,266; 18.88%	Brian Dunfield (Independent); 323; 1.87%	William Higgins
St. John's East; 89.32% turnout	Henry Bartlett; 2,514; 14.53%	Cyril Fox; 3,116; 18.01%	Brian Dunfield (Independent); 323; 1.87%	Cyril Fox
St. John's East; 89.32% turnout	Arthur Bulley; 2,404; 13.90%	Nicholas Vinnicombe; 3,083; 17.82%	Brian Dunfield (Independent); 323; 1.87%	Nicholas Vinnicombe
St. John's West; 95.31% turnout	**Richard Squires**; 2,759; 16.89%	Charles Hunt; 2,790; 17.08%		**Richard Squires**
St. John's West; 95.31% turnout	Alexander Campbell; 2,755; 16.86%	Michael Cashin; 2,770; 16.95%		Henry Brownrigg†
St. John's West; 95.31% turnout	Joseph Fitzgibbon; 2,617; 16.02%	William Linegar; 2,648; 16.21%		**John R. Bennett**‡ (ran in Harbour Grace)

=== Conception Bay ===
Electoral district	Candidates			Incumbent
Electoral district	Liberal Reform	Liberal-Labour-Progressive	Other	Incumbent
Bay de Verde; 84.52% turnout	William Cave; 1,199; 27.66%	John Crosbie; 1,049; 24.20%		Frederick LeGrow†
Bay de Verde; 84.52% turnout	Richard Cramm; 1,116; 25.74%	John Puddester; 971; 22.40%		William Cave
Carbonear; 77.89% turnout	Joseph Maddock; 440; 48.03%	James Moore; 476; 51.97%		William Penney†
Harbour Grace; 85.19% turnout	Archibald Piccott; 1,296; 18.26%	**John R. Bennett**; 1,147; 16.16%		George A. Gosse†
Harbour Grace; 85.19% turnout	Ernest Simmons; 1,234; 17.39%	Albert Hickman; 1,132; 15.95%		Arthur Barnes‡ (ran in Twillingate)
Harbour Grace; 85.19% turnout	Augustus Calpin; 1,210; 17.05%	Frank Archibald; 1,078; 15.19%		Frank Archibald
Harbour Main; 76.44% turnout	Matthew Hawco; 914; 25.80%	William Woodford; 807; 22.78%	William Jones (Independent); 304; 8.58%	William Jones
Harbour Main; 76.44% turnout	John J. St. John; 746; 21.06%	Patrick Kennedy; 771; 21.77%	William Jones (Independent); 304; 8.58%	William Woodford
Port de Grave; 84.87% turnout	Harry A. Winter; 886; 60.07%	William Mackay; 589; 39.93%		John Crosbie‡ (ran in Bay de Verde)

=== Avalon Peninsula ===
Electoral district	Candidates		Incumbent
Electoral district	Liberal Reform	Liberal-Labour-Progressive	Incumbent
Ferryland; 90.07% turnout	Ambrose Hearn; 412; 15.69%	Peter Cashin; 1,090; 41.51%	Michael Cashin‡ (ran in St. John's West)
Ferryland; 90.07% turnout	George McGuire; 193; 7.35%	Philip Moore; 931; 35.45%	Philip Moore
Placentia and St. Mary's; 84.40% turnout	Thomas Bonia; 944; 8.58%	Michael S. Sullivan; 2,963; 26.92%	William Walsh
Placentia and St. Mary's; 84.40% turnout	William Browne; 804; 7.31%	William Walsh; 2,890; 26.26%	Michael Sullivan
Placentia and St. Mary's; 84.40% turnout	James Bindon; 668; 6.07%	Edward Sinnott; 2,737; 24.87%	Edward Sinnott

=== Eastern Newfoundland ===
Electoral district	Candidates		Incumbent
Electoral district	FPU	Liberal-Labour-Progressive	Incumbent
Bonavista Bay; 85.95% turnout	**William Coaker**; 3,045; 18.44%	Walter Monroe; 2,628; 15.92%	**William Coaker**
Bonavista Bay; 85.95% turnout	Robert G. Winsor; 2,950; 17.87%	Lewis Little; 2,498; 15.13%	John Abbott
Bonavista Bay; 85.95% turnout	John Abbott; 2,932; 17.76%	William C. Winsor; 2,458; 14.89%	Robert G. Winsor
Trinity Bay; 79.66% turnout	William Halfyard; 3,233; 22.44%	John Stone; 1,819; 12.63%	William Halfyard
Trinity Bay; 79.66% turnout	Richard Hibbs; 3,069; 21.31%	F. Gordon Bradley; 1,648; 11.44%	John Guppy†
Trinity Bay; 79.66% turnout	Isaac Randell; 3,003; 20.85%	James G. Hodder; 1,633; 11.34%	Archibald Targett†

=== Central Newfoundland ===
Electoral district	Candidates		Incumbent
Electoral district	FPU	Liberal-Labour-Progressive	Incumbent
Fogo; 80.00% turnout	George Grimes; 1,121; 56.73%	J. J. Long; 855; 43.27%	Richard Hibbs‡ (ran in Trinity Bay)
Twillingate; 77.83% turnout	Kenneth Brown; 3,491; 22.77%	James S. Ayre; 1,784; 11.63%	Walter Jennings†
Twillingate; 77.83% turnout	Arthur Barnes; 3,406; 22.21%	Joseph Peters; 1,678; 10.94%	George Jones
Twillingate; 77.83% turnout	George Jones; 3,343; 21.80%	Kenneth Short; 1,632; 10.64%	Solomon Samson†

=== Southern and Western Newfoundland ===
Electoral district	Candidates		Incumbent
Electoral district	Liberal Reform	Liberal-Labour-Progressive	Incumbent
Burgeo and LaPoile; 79.46% turnout	Harvey Small; 881; 50.95%	Walter Chambers; 848; 49.04%	Harvey Small
Burin; 78.98% turnout	Samuel Foote; 1,182; 24.82%	George Harris; 1,288; 27.05%	John Cheeseman
Burin; 78.98% turnout	John Cheeseman; 1,150; 24.15%	Eric Chafe; 1,142; 23.98%	Samuel Foote
Fortune Bay; 68.67% turnout	William Warren; 1,675; 83.17%	Philip Outerbridge; 339; 16.83%	William Warren
St. Barbe; 78.15% turnout	J. H. Scammell (FPU); 1,365; 57.21%	Joseph Moore; 1,021; 42.79%	J. H. Scammell
St. George's; 78.37% turnout	Joseph Downey; 1,511; 58.25%	James MacDonnell; 1,083; 41.75%	James MacDonnell
