= 1919 Newfoundland general election =

Election in the Dominion of Newfoundland

- November 3, 1919

36 seats of the Newfoundland House of Assembly 19 seats needed for a majority
- Turnout: 72.69% (▼6.52pp)
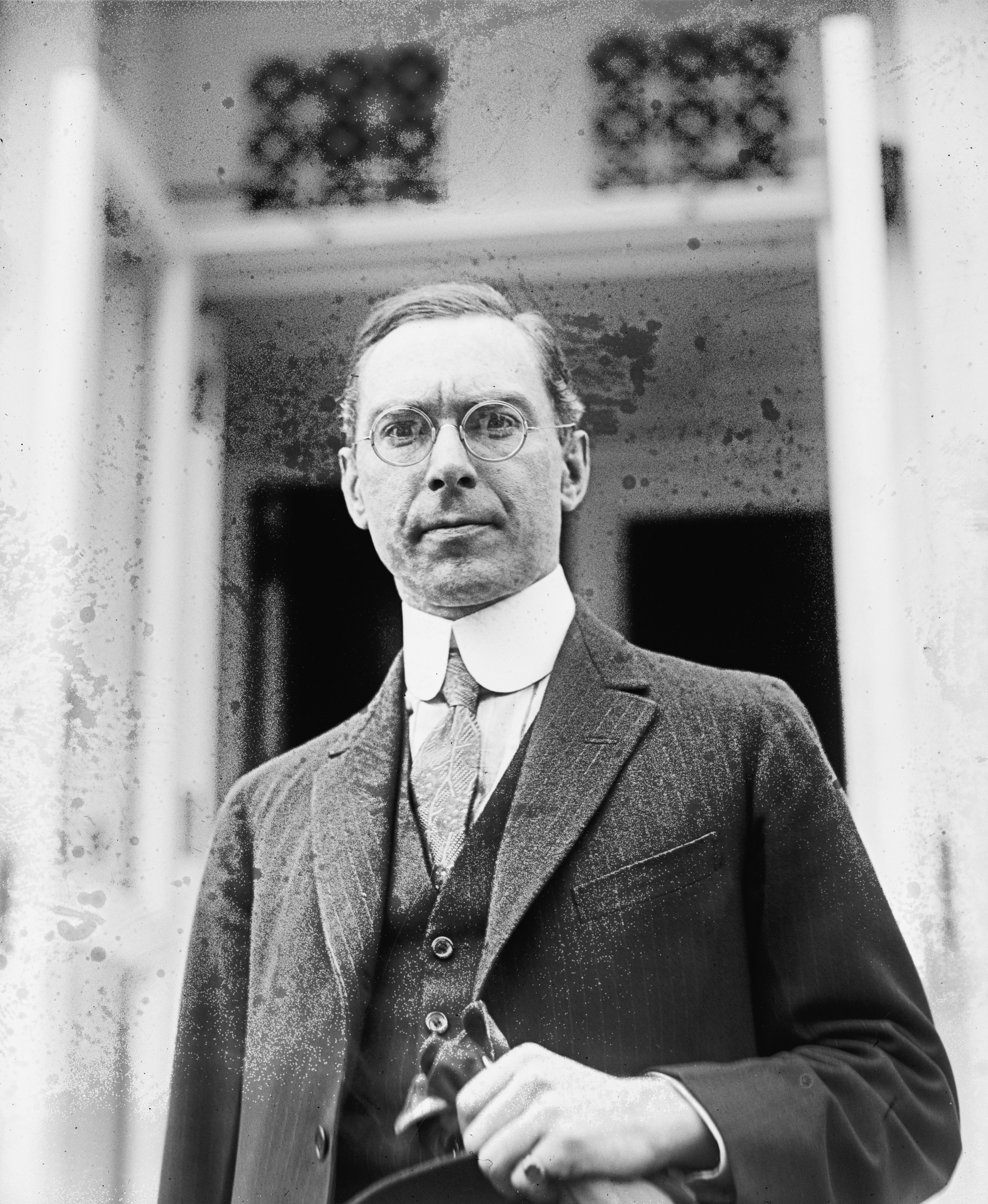

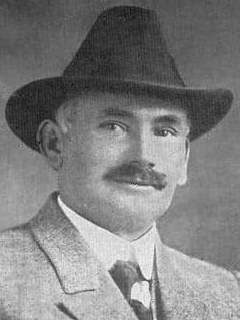

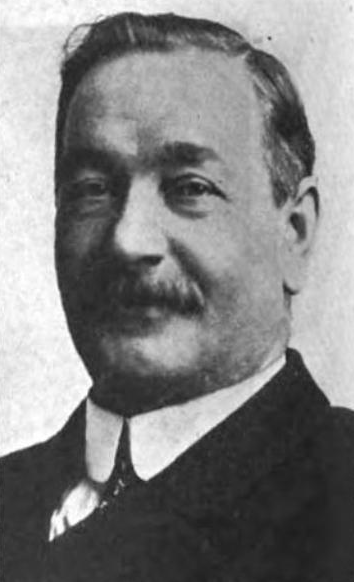
	First party	Second party
Leader	Richard Squires and William Coaker	Michael Cashin
Party	Liberal Reform	Liberal-Progressive
Leader since	1919 / 1908	1919
Leader's seat	St. John's West (Note: Not the incumbent, but stood in this district and won) / Bonavista Bay	Ferryland
Last election	15 seats, 54.32% (Note: As the Liberal Party)	21 seats, 45.55% (Note: As the People's Party)
Seats won	24	12
Seat change	▲9	▼9
Popular vote	70,207	43,250
Percentage	59.64%	36.70%
Swing	▲5.32%	▼8.85%
- Results by district
Prime Minister before election
Michael Cashin
People's
Prime Minister after election
Richard Squires
Liberal Reform

The 1919 Newfoundland general election was held on November 3, 1919 to elect members of the 24th General Assembly of Newfoundland in the Dominion of Newfoundland. The Liberal Reform Party, an alliance between the Liberals led by Richard Squires and the Fishermen's Protective Union of William Coaker, formed the government. The People's Party became the Liberal-Labour-Progressive party following the election and formed the opposition.

== Results ==
Party	Leader	1913	Candidates	Seats won	Seat change	% of seats (% change)	Popular vote	% of vote (% change)
Liberal Reform	Richard Squires	15	36; Liberal 24; FPU 12	24; Liberal 13; FPU 11	▲9	66.67% (▲25.00%)	70,207; FPU 36,329; Liberal 33,878	59.64% (▲5.32%)
Fishermen's Protective Union	William Coaker	15	36; Liberal 24; FPU 12	24; Liberal 13; FPU 11	▲9	66.67% (▲25.00%)	70,207; FPU 36,329; Liberal 33,878	59.64% (▲5.32%)
Liberal-Progressive	Michael Cashin	21	36	12	▼9	33.33% (▼25.00%)	43,520	36.70% (▼8.85%)
Labour (Note: Also known as the Workingmen's Party)	N/A	–	3	0	Steady	0.00%	2,835	2.41% (▲2.41%)
Other		0	3	0	Steady	0.00%	1,157	0.98% (▲0.84%)
Totals		36	78	36	Steady	100%	117,719 (Note: This figure includes votes cast for more than one candidate in multi-member districts. A total of 50,967 individual votes were cast in this election.)	100%

== Results by district ==
- Names in **boldface type** represent party leaders.
- † indicates that the incumbent did not run again.
- ‡ indicates that the incumbent ran in a different district.

=== St. John's ===
Electoral district	Candidates				Incumbent
Electoral district	People's	Liberal Reform	Labour	Other	Incumbent
St. John's East; 80.64% turnout	William Higgins; 2,925; 18.11%	Henry Bartlett; 2,410; 14.92%		Thomas Murphy (Independent); 635; 3.93%	Vacant (Note: James M. Kent had been elected in 1913, but he had accepted an appointment to the Supreme Court in 1916.)
St. John's East; 80.64% turnout	Cyril Fox; 2,775; 17.18%	Leo Carter; 2,379; 14.73%		Thomas Murphy (Independent); 635; 3.93%	William Higgins
St. John's East; 80.64% turnout	Nicholas Vinnicombe; 2,707; 16.76%	Daniel Curtin; 2,321; 14.36%		Thomas Murphy (Independent); 635; 3.93%	Vacant (Note: John Dwyer had been elected in 1913, but he had died while in office on January 23, 1917.)
St. John's West; 76.33% turnout	John R. Bennett; 1,808; 13.30%	**Richard Squires**; 1,954; 14.38%	William Linegar; 1,025; 7.54%	J. Sinclair Tait (Independent); 102; 0.75%	Vacant (Note: Edward Morris had been elected in 1913, but he had resigned after accepting the peerage title of Baron Morris in 1917.)
St. John's West; 76.33% turnout	James Martin; 1,749; 12.87%	Henry Brownrigg; 1,839; 13.53%	John Caldwell; 933; 6.86%	J. Sinclair Tait (Independent); 102; 0.75%	John R. Bennett
St. John's West; 76.33% turnout	J. J. Mullaly; 1,646; 12.11%	Alexander Campbell; 1,658; 12.20%	Michael Foley; 877; 6.45%	J. Sinclair Tait (Independent); 102; 0.75%	Vacant (Note: Michael Kennedy had been elected in 1913, but he had died while in office on January 21, 1917.)

=== Conception Bay ===
Electoral district	Candidates			Incumbent
Electoral district	People's	Liberal Reform	Other	Incumbent
Bay de Verde (Note: Hickman later charged Cave with electoral irregularities, and in return, Cave alleged that Hickman had received bribes from public officials. The Supreme Court of Newfoundland declared both men guilty and voided their results. A by-election was held which affirmed Cave's victory.); 82.94% turnout	Albert Hickman; 1,193; 25.55%	Frederick LeGrow; 1,207; 25.85%		Albert Hickman
Bay de Verde; 82.94% turnout	Jesse Whiteway; 1,071; 22.94%	William Cave; 1,198; 25.66%		John Crosbie‡ (ran in Port de Grave)
Carbonear; 64.89% turnout	James Moore; 317; 34.23%	William Penney; 609; 65.77%		Vacant (Note: John Goodison had been elected in 1913, but he had resigned his seat in 1918 to become the government purchasing agent.)
Harbour Grace; 69.36% turnout	Archibald Piccott; 821; 12.54%	George Gosse; 1,388; 21.20%	Charles Russell (Independent); 419; 6.40%	Archibald Piccott
Harbour Grace; 69.36% turnout	Edward Parsons; 626; 9.56%	Arthur Barnes; 1,385; 21.15%	Charles Russell (Independent); 419; 6.40%	Edward Parsons
Harbour Grace; 69.36% turnout	Josiah Gosse; 561; 8.57%	Frank Archibald; 1,347; 20.57%	Charles Russell (Independent); 419; 6.40%	Moses Young†
Harbour Main; 71.18% turnout	William Jones; 1,101; 28.83%	John Meaney; 866; 22.68%		William Woodford
Harbour Main; 71.18% turnout	William Woodford; 1,039; 27.21%	Walter Kennedy; 813; 21.29%		George Kennedy†
Port de Grave; 74.25% turnout	John Crosbie; 837; 55.61%	George Grimes (FPU); 668; 44.39%		George Grimes

=== Avalon Peninsula ===
Electoral district	Candidates		Incumbent
Electoral district	People's	Liberal Reform	Incumbent
Ferryland; 84.39% turnout	**Michael Cashin**; 1,190; 40.33%	Michael Hartery; 436; 14.77%	**Michael Cashin**
Ferryland; 84.39% turnout	Philip Moore; 1,012; 34.29%	Arthur English; 313; 10.61%	Philip Moore
Placentia and St. Mary's; 78.23% turnout	William Walsh; 2,258; 21.39%	John M. Devine; 1,376; 13.03%	Richard Devereaux†
Placentia and St. Mary's; 78.23% turnout	Michael Sullivan; 2,146; 20.33%	William Jackman; 1,370; 12.98%	Frank Morris†
Placentia and St. Mary's; 78.23% turnout	Edward Sinnott; 2,129; 20.17%	Philip Brown; 1,278; 12.11%	William Walsh

=== Eastern Newfoundland ===
Electoral district	Candidates		Incumbent
Electoral district	People's	FPU	Incumbent
Bonavista Bay; 75.39% turnout	William C. Winsor; 1,550; 10.06%	**William Coaker**; 3,732; 24.21%	Alfred Morine
Bonavista Bay; 75.39% turnout	Chesley Forbes; 1,485; 9.63%	John Abbott; 3,611; 23.43%	Robert G. Winsor
Bonavista Bay; 75.39% turnout	Alfred Morine; 1,455; 9.44%	Robert G. Winsor; 3,582; 23.24%	John Abbott
Trinity Bay; 70.55% turnout	John Stone; 1,185; 8.53%	William Halfyard; 3,768; 27.12%	John Stone
Trinity Bay; 70.55% turnout	Robert Matthews; 962; 6.93%	John Guppy; 3,576; 25.75%	Archibald Targett
Trinity Bay; 70.55% turnout	Andrew Carnell; 859; 6.18%	Archibald Targett; 3,539; 25.48%	William F. Lloyd†

=== Central Newfoundland ===
Electoral district	Candidates		Incumbent
Electoral district	People's	FPU	Incumbent
Fogo; 66.12% turnout	Jesse Oake; 252; 14.32%	Richard Hibbs; 1,508; 85.68%	William Halfyard‡ (ran in Trinity Bay)
Twillingate; 64.47% turnout	William Mackay; 922; 6.94%	Walter Jennings; 3,718; 28.00%	William Coaker‡ (ran in Bonavista Bay)
Twillingate; 64.47% turnout	Lorenzo Moore; 881; 6.64%	George Jones; 3,683; 27.74%	James Clift†
Twillingate; 64.47% turnout	Kenneth Short; 656; 25.74%	Solomon Samson; 3,417; 25.74%	Walter Jennings

=== Southern and Western Newfoundland ===
Electoral district	Candidates		Incumbent
Electoral district	People's	Liberal Reform	Incumbent
Burgeo and LaPoile; 75.20% turnout	Charlie James; 231; 13.92%	Harvey Small; 1,428; 86.08%	Robert Moulton†
Burin; 76.81% turnout	George Bartlett; 680; 15.22%	John Cheeseman; 1,568; 35.09%	John Currie
Burin; 76.81% turnout	John Currie; 679; 15.19%	Samuel Foote; 1,542; 34.50%	Thomas LeFeuvre†
Fortune Bay; 80.01% turnout	Henry Elliott; 451; 20.20%	William Warren; 1,782; 79.80%	Vacant (Note: Charles Emerson had been elected in 1913, but he had resigned his seat in November 1917 to become the Registrar of the Supreme Court of Newfoundland.)
St. Barbe; 68.17% turnout	Abram Kean; 660; 30.46%	J. H. Scammell (FPU); 1,507; 69.54%	William Clapp†
St. George's; 62.12% turnout	Joseph Downey; 701; 32.88%	James MacDonnell; 1,431; 67.12%	Joseph Downey
