= 24th General Assembly of Newfoundland =

Dominion of Newfoundland legislature

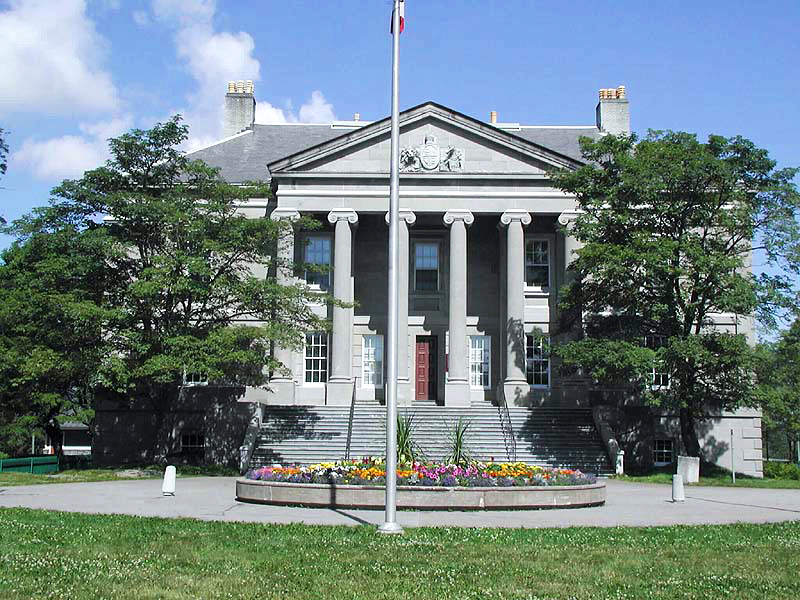
- Colonial Building seat of the Newfoundland government and the House of Assembly from January 28, 1850, to July 28, 1959.

History
- Founded: 1920
- Disbanded: 1923
- Preceded by: 23rd General Assembly of Newfoundland
- Succeeded by: 25th General Assembly of Newfoundland

Leadership
- Premier: Richard Squires

Elections
- Last election: 1919 Newfoundland general election

The members of the 24th General Assembly of Newfoundland were elected in the Newfoundland general election held in November 1919. The general assembly sat from 1920 to 1923.

The Liberal Reform Party, an alliance between the Liberals and the Fishermen's Protective Union, calling itself Liberal Reform, formed the government. Richard Squires served as Newfoundland's prime minister.

The Newfoundland People's Party, in opposition, adopted the name Liberal-Progressive.

William F. Penney served as speaker.

Sir Charles Alexander Harris served as governor of Newfoundland until 1922. Sir William Allardyce succeeded Harris as governor.

== Members of the Assembly ==
The following members were elected to the assembly in 1919:

| Member | Electoral district | Affiliation | First elected / previously elected |
|---|---|---|---|
| F. P. LeGrow | Bay de Verde | Liberal Reform | 1919 |
| William H. Cave | Bay de Verde | Liberal Reform | 1919 |
| William F. Coaker | Bonavista | Liberal Reform (FPU) | 1913 |
| John Abbott | Bonavista | Liberal Reform (FPU) | 1913 |
| Robert G. Winsor | Bonavista | Liberal Reform (FPU) | 1913 |
| Harvey Small | Burgeo-La Poile | Liberal Reform | 1919 |
| John T. Cheeseman | Burin | Liberal Reform | 1919 |
| Samuel J. Foote | Burin | Liberal Reform | 1919 |
| W. F. Penney | Carbonear | Liberal Reform | 1919 |
| Michael P. Cashin | Ferryland | Liberal-Progressive | 1893 |
| Philip F. Moore | Ferryland | Liberal-Progressive | 1909 |
| Richard Hibbs | Fogo | Liberal Reform (FPU) | 1919 |
| William R. Warren | Fortune Bay | Liberal Reform | 1902, (Note: Trinity) 1908, (Note: Port de Grave) 1919 |
| G. A. Gosse | Harbour Grace | Liberal Reform | 1919 |
| Arthur Barnes | Harbour Grace | Liberal Reform | 1904, 1919 |
| Frank C. Archibald | Harbour Grace | Liberal Reform | 1919 |
| W. E. Jones | Harbour Main | Liberal-Progressive | 1919 |
| William J. Woodford | Harbour Main | Liberal-Progressive | 1908 |
| William J. Walsh | Placentia and St. Mary's | Liberal-Progressive | 1913 |
| Michael S. Sullivan | Placentia and St. Mary's | Liberal-Progressive | 1904, 1919 |
| E. Sinnott | Placentia and St. Mary's | Liberal-Progressive | 1919 |
| John C. Crosbie | Port de Grave | Liberal-Progressive | 1908 |
| J. H. Scammell | St. Barbe | Liberal Reform (FPU) | 1919 |
| James MacDonnell (Note: Joined Liberal-Progressives shortly after cabinet named) | St. George's | Liberal Reform | 1919 |
| James MacDonnell | St. George's | Liberal-Progressive | 1919 |
| William J. Higgins | St. John's East | Liberal-Progressive | 1913 |
| Cyril J. Fox | St. John's East | Liberal-Progressive | 1919 |
| N. J. Vinnicombe | St. John's East | Liberal-Progressive | 1919 |
| Richard A. Squires | St. John's West | Liberal Reform | 1909, 1919 |
| Henry J. Brownrigg | St. John's West | Liberal Reform | 1919 |
| John R. Bennett | St. John's West | Liberal-Progressive | 1919 |
| William W. Halfyard | Trinity | Liberal Reform (FPU) | 1913 |
| John Guppy | Trinity | Liberal Reform (FPU) | 1919 |
| Archibald Targett | Trinity | Liberal Reform (FPU) | 1913 |
| Walter Jennings | Twillingate | Liberal Reform (FPU) | 1913 |
| George Jones | Twillingate | Liberal Reform (FPU) | 1919 |
| Solomon Samson | Twillingate | Liberal Reform (FPU) | 1919 |

== By-elections ==
By-elections were held to replace members for various reasons:

| Electoral district | Member elected | Affiliation | Election date | Reason |
|---|---|---|---|---|
| Bay de Verde | William H. Cave | Liberal Reform | 1920 | Results of election declared invalid |
