= 25th General Assembly of Newfoundland =

Dominion of Newfoundland legislature

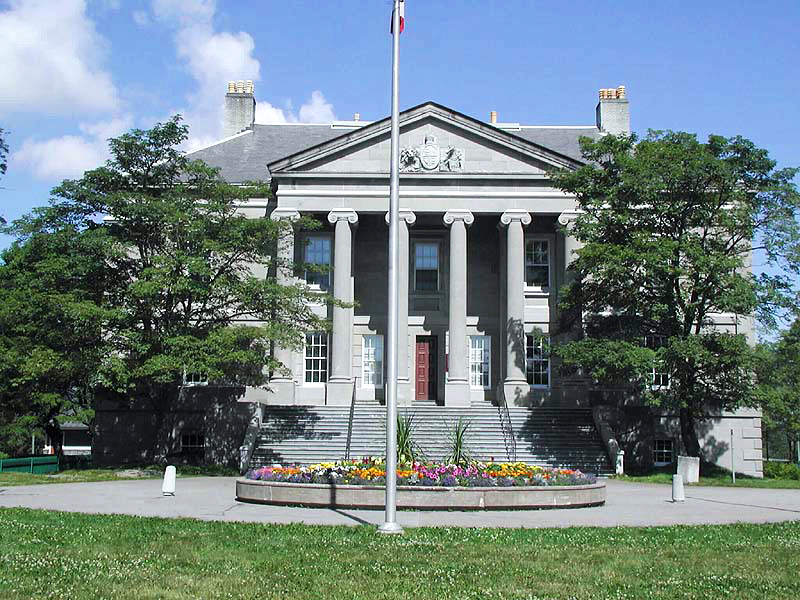
- Colonial Building seat of the Newfoundland government and the House of Assembly from January 28, 1850, to July 28, 1959.

History
- Founded: 1923
- Disbanded: 1924
- Preceded by: 24th General Assembly of Newfoundland
- Succeeded by: 26th General Assembly of Newfoundland

Leadership
- Premier: Richard Squires (Until July 1923)
- Premier: William Warren (Until May 1924)
- Premier: Albert Hickman

Elections
- Last election: 1923 Newfoundland general election

The members of the 25th General Assembly of Newfoundland were elected in the Newfoundland general election held in May 1923. The general assembly sat from 1923 to 1924.

The Liberal Reform Party, an alliance between the Liberals and the Fishermen's Protective Union, formed the government. Richard Squires served as Newfoundland's prime minister until July 1923 when he resigned as prime minister after his government was accused of misuse of public funds. William Warren succeeded Squires as government leader but his government was defeated by a motion of no confidence in April 1924. A new government led by Albert Hickman was formed bringing together some Liberal Reform MHAs and some MHAs from other parties to form the Liberal-Progressive Party which governed as a caretaker administration for 33 days until the general election held in June 1924.

Harry A. Winter served as speaker.

Sir William Allardyce served as governor of Newfoundland.

== Members of the Assembly ==
The following members were elected to the assembly in 1923:

Member	Electoral district	Affiliation	First elected / previously elected
William H. Cave	Bay de Verde	Liberal Reform	1919
Richard Cramm	Bay de Verde	Liberal Reform	1923
William F. Coaker	Bonavista	Liberal Reform	1913
Robert G. Winsor	Bonavista	Liberal Reform	1913
John Abbott	Bonavista	Liberal Reform	1913
Harvey Small	Burgeo-La Poile	Liberal Reform	1919
George C. Harris	Burin	Liberal-Labour-Progressive	1923
Samuel J. Foote	Burin	Liberal Reform	1919
James Moore	Carbonear	Liberal-Labour-Progressive	1923
Peter J. Cashin	Ferryland	Liberal-Labour-Progressive	1923
Philip F. Moore	Ferryland	Liberal-Labour-Progressive	1909
George F. Grimes	Fogo	Liberal Reform	1913, 1923
William R. Warren	Fortune Bay	Liberal Reform	1902, (Note: Trinity) 1908, (Note: Port de Grave) 1919
A. W. Piccott	Harbour Grace	Liberal Reform	1908, 1923
E. Simmons	Harbour Grace	Liberal Reform	1923
A. M. Calpin	Harbour Grace	Liberal Reform	1923
Matthew E. Hawco	Harbour Main	Liberal Reform	1923
William J. Woodford	Harbour Main	Liberal-Labour-Progressive	1908
Michael S. Sullivan	Placentia and St. Mary's	Liberal-Labour-Progressive	1904, 1919
William J. Walsh	Placentia and St. Mary's	Liberal-Labour-Progressive	1913
E. Sinnott	Placentia and St. Mary's	Liberal-Labour-Progressive	1919
Harry A. Winter	Port de Grave	Liberal Reform	1923
J. H. Scammell	St. Barbe	Liberal Reform	1919
Joseph F. Downey	St. George's	Liberal Reform	1908, 1913, 1923
William J. Higgins	St. John's East	Liberal-Labour-Progressive	1913
Cyril J. Fox	St. John's East	Liberal-Labour-Progressive	1919
N. J. Vinnicombe	St. John's East	Liberal-Labour-Progressive	1923
C. E. Hunt	St. John's West	Liberal-Labour-Progressive	1923
Michael P. Cashin	St. John's West	Liberal-Labour-Progressive	1893
Richard A. Squires	St. John's West	Liberal Reform	1909, 1919
William W. Halfyard	Trinity	Liberal Reform	1913
Richard Hibbs	Trinity	Liberal Reform	1919
I. R. Randell	Trinity	Liberal Reform	1923
Kenneth M. Brown	Twillingate	Liberal Reform	1923
Arthur Barnes	Twillingate	Liberal Reform	1904, 1919
George Jones	Twillingate	Liberal Reform	1919

== By-elections ==
None
