= 23rd General Assembly of Newfoundland =

Dominion of Newfoundland legislature

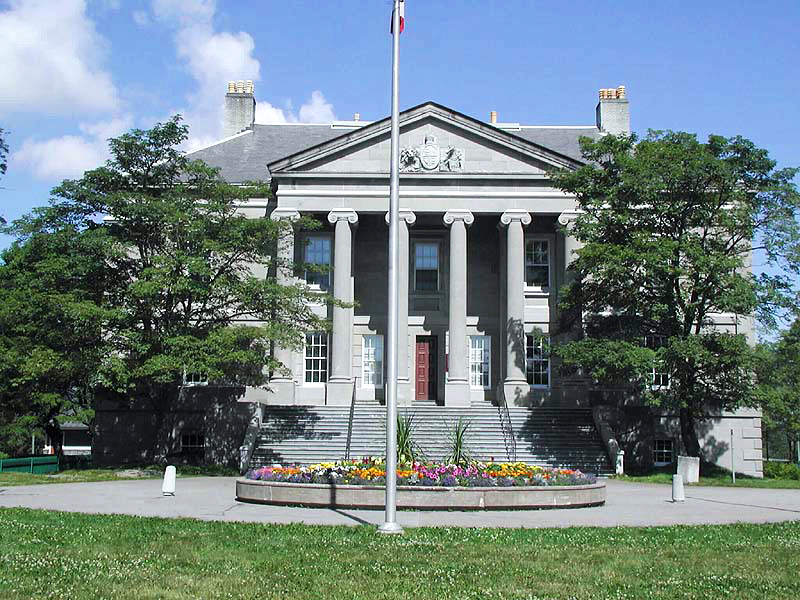
- Colonial Building seat of the Newfoundland government and the House of Assembly from January 28, 1850, to July 28, 1959.

History
- Founded: 1914
- Disbanded: 1919
- Preceded by: 22nd General Assembly of Newfoundland
- Succeeded by: 24th General Assembly of Newfoundland

Leadership
- Premier: Edward P. Morris (until December 1917)
- Premier: William F. Lloyd (until May 1919)
- Premier: Michael P. Cashin

Elections
- Last election: 1913 Newfoundland general election

The members of the 23rd General Assembly of Newfoundland were elected in the Newfoundland general election held in October 1913. The general assembly sat from 1914 to 1919.

The Newfoundland People's Party led by Edward P. Morris formed the government. The Liberal Party and the Fishermen's Protective Union joined in a coalition which sat in opposition to the government. In July 1917, a National Government was formed with Morris as leader; the cabinet contained representatives from all three parties. Morris resigned from the assembly in late December 1917 when he was named to the British House of Lords. William F. Lloyd became Premier and leader of the National Government in January 1918.

Because of World War I, the general election which would normally have occurred in 1917 was delayed by a year. In 1918, legislation was passed extending the life of the assembly by another year. The Lloyd government was brought down by a vote of no confidence in May 1919. Michael P. Cashin was asked by Governor Harris to form a government which remained in power until the general election scheduled later in 1919.

John R. Goodison served as speaker until 1918 when William J. Higgins succeeded Goodison as speaker.

Sir Walter Edward Davidson served as governor of Newfoundland until 1917. Sir Charles Alexander Harris succeeded Davidson as governor.

The Military Services Act was passed in May 1918 to allow for the conscription of unmarried men between the ages of 19 and 40 to replace losses from the Newfoundland Regiment during the first World War. However, the war ended before any of these new soldiers reached the front.

== Members of the Assembly ==
The following members were elected to the assembly in 1913:

Member	Electoral district	Affiliation	First elected / previously elected
Albert E. Hickman	Bay de Verde	Liberal	1913
John Crosbie	Bay de Verde	People's Party	1908
William F. Coaker	Bonavista	Fishermen's Protective Union	1913
Robert G. Winsor	Bonavista	Fishermen's Protective Union	1913
John Abbott	Bonavista	Fishermen's Protective Union	1913
Alfred B. Morine (1914)	Bonavista	Fishermen's Protective Union	1886, 1914
Robert Moulton	Burgeo-La Poile	People's Party	1904
John S. Currie	Burin	People's Party	1913
Thomas LeFeuvre	Burin	People's Party	1911
John Goodison	Carbonear	People's Party	1909
Michael P. Cashin	Ferryland	People's Party	1893
Philip F. Moore	Ferryland	People's Party	1909
William W. Halfyard	Fogo	Fishermen's Protective Union	1913
Charles Emerson	Fortune Bay	People's Party	1908
A. W. Piccott	Harbour Grace	People's Party	1908
E. Parsons	Harbour Grace	People's Party	1908
M. M. Young	Harbour Grace	People's Party	1913
William Woodford	Harbour Main	People's Party	1908
G. Kennedy	Harbour Main	People's Party	1913
R. J. Devereaux	Placentia and St. Mary's	People's Party	1909
Frank J. Morris	Placentia and St. Mary's	People's Party	1909
William J. Walsh	Placentia and St. Mary's	People's Party	1913
George F. Grimes	Port de Grave	Fishermen's Protective Union	1913
William M. Clapp	St. Barbe	Liberal	1904
Joseph Downey	St. George's	People's Party	1908
James M. Kent	St. John's East	Liberal	1904
William J. Higgins	St. John's East	People's Party	1913
John Dwyer	St. John's East	Liberal	1900
Edward P. Morris	St. John's West	People's Party	1885
John R. Bennett	St. John's West	People's Party	1904
Michael Kennedy	St. John's West	People's Party	1908
John G. Stone	Trinity	Fishermen's Protective Union	1913
Archibald Targett	Trinity	Fishermen's Protective Union	1913
William F. Lloyd	Trinity	Liberal	1904, 1913
Robert Bond	Twillingate	Liberal	1882
James A. Clift	Twillingate	Liberal	1900
Walter Jennings	Twillingate	Fishermen's Protective Union	1913
William F. Coaker	Twillingate	Fishermen's Protective Union	1913

== By-elections ==
By-elections were held to replace members for various reasons:

Electoral district	Member elected	Affiliation	Election date	Reason
Twillingate	William F. Coaker (Note: Elected by acclamation)	Fishermen's Protective Union	November 26, 1914	R Bond resigned his seat January 14, 1914
Bonavista	Alfred B. Morine	Fishermen's Protective Union	November 26, 1914	WF Coaker resigned his seat to contest Twillingate
