= 26th General Assembly of Newfoundland =

Dominion of Newfoundland legislature

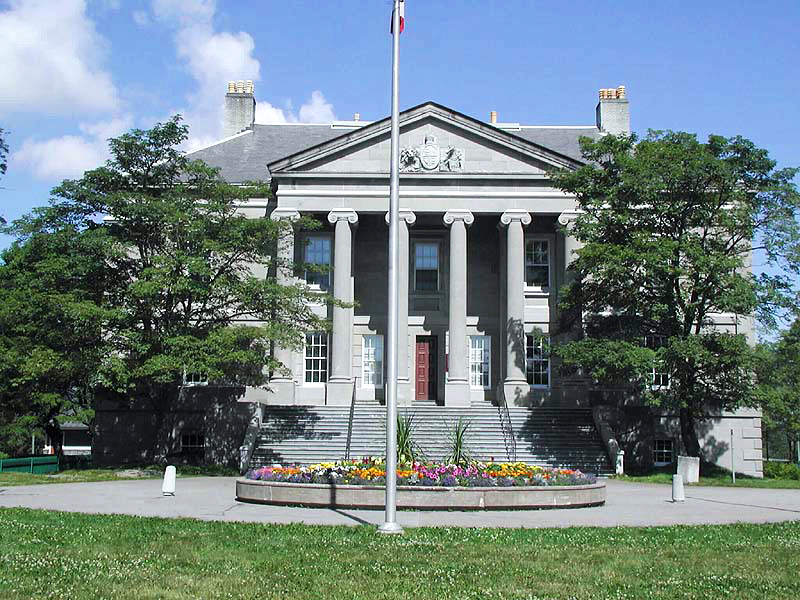
- Colonial Building seat of the Newfoundland government and the House of Assembly from January 28, 1850, to July 28, 1959.

History
- Founded: 1924
- Disbanded: 1928
- Preceded by: 25th General Assembly of Newfoundland
- Succeeded by: 27th General Assembly of Newfoundland

Leadership
- Premier: Walter Stanley Monroe (Until August 1928)
- Premier: Frederick C. Alderdice

Elections
- Last election: 1924 Newfoundland general election

The members of the 26th General Assembly of Newfoundland were elected in the Newfoundland general election held in June 1924. The general assembly sat from 1924 to 1928.

The Liberal-Conservative Progressive Party led by Walter Stanley Monroe formed the government. Monroe resigned as prime minister in August 1928 and was succeeded by Frederick C. Alderdice.

Cyril Fox served as speaker.

Sir William Allardyce served as governor of Newfoundland.

The Liberal-Progressive Party had been formed after the collapse of the Liberal Reform government in 1924 when former Liberal Reformers joined with Albert Hickman to form a new government in the dying days of the previous General Assembly.

In April 1925, Newfoundland's Election Act was amended to grant all women over the age of 25 the right to vote; men were allowed to vote at the age of 21. Also on April 25, an act was passed that changed the distribution of seats in the House of Assembly.

== Members of the Assembly ==
The following members were elected to the assembly in 1924:

Member	Electoral district	Affiliation	First elected / previously elected
Richard Cramm	Bay de Verde	Liberal-Conservative	1923
John C. Puddester	Bay de Verde	Liberal-Conservative	1924
Walter S. Monroe	Bonavista	Liberal-Conservative	1924
Lewis Little	Bonavista	Liberal-Conservative	1924
William C. Winsor	Bonavista	Liberal-Conservative	1904, 1924
Walter M. Chambers	Burgeo-La Poile	Liberal-Conservative	1924
H. B. C. Lake	Burin	Liberal-Conservative	1924
J. J. Lang	Burin	Liberal-Conservative	1924
Robert Duff	Carbonear	Liberal-Progressive	1924
Peter J. Cashin	Ferryland	Liberal-Conservative	1923
Philip F. Moore	Ferryland	Liberal-Conservative	1909
R. Hibbs	Fogo	Liberal-Progressive	1919
William R. Warren	Fortune Bay	Independent	1902, (Note: Trinity) 1908, (Note: Port de Grave) 1919
Harris M. Mosdell (1926)	Fortune Bay	Liberal-Progressive	1926
Albert E. Hickman	Harbour Grace	Liberal-Progressive	1913, 1924
John R. Bennett	Harbour Grace	Liberal-Conservative	1904, 1924
C. E. Russell	Harbour Grace	Liberal-Conservative	1924
William J. Woodford	Harbour Main	Liberal-Conservative	1908
C. J. Cahill	Harbour Main	Liberal-Conservative	1924
Michael S. Sullivan	Placentia and St. Mary's	Liberal-Conservative	1904, 1919
William J. Walsh	Placentia and St. Mary's	Liberal-Conservative	1913
E. F. Sinnott	Placentia and St. Mary's	Liberal-Conservative	1919
F. Gordon Bradley	Port de Grave	Liberal-Conservative	1924
F. Gordon Bradley	Port de Grave	Independent	1924
J. H. Scammell	St. Barbe	Liberal-Progressive	1919
T. J. Power	St. George's	Liberal-Conservative	1924
William J. Higgins	St. John's East	Liberal-Conservative	1913
Cyril J. Fox	St. John's East	Liberal-Conservative	1919
N. J. Vinnicombe	St. John's East	Liberal-Conservative	1923
William E. Brophy (1927)	St. John's East	Liberal-Progressive	1927
John C. Crosbie	St. John's West	Liberal-Conservative	1908, 1924
William J. Browne	St. John's West	Liberal-Conservative	1924
W. L. Linegar	St. John's West	Liberal-Conservative	1924
William W. Halfyard	Trinity	Liberal-Progressive	1913
I. R. Randell	Trinity	Liberal-Progressive	1923
E. J. Godden	Trinity	Liberal-Progressive	1924
Kenneth M. Brown	Twillingate	Liberal-Progressive	1923
George F. Grimes	Twillingate	Liberal-Progressive	1913
Thomas G. W. Ashbourne	Twillingate	Liberal-Progressive	1924

== By-elections ==
By-elections were held to replace members for various reasons:

Electoral district	Member elected	Affiliation	Election date	Reason
Harbour Main	William J. Woodford (Note: Elected by acclamation)	Liberal-Conservative	1924	W J Woodward named to cabinet
Placentia and St. Mary's	William J. Walsh	Liberal-Conservative	1924	W J Walsh named to cabinet
St. John's East	William J. Higgins	Liberal-Conservative	1924	W J Higgins named to cabinet
St. John's West	John C. Crosbie	Liberal-Conservative	1924	J C Crosbie named to cabinet
Harbour Grace	John R. Bennett	Liberal-Conservative	July 3, 1924	J R Bennett named to cabinet
Harbour Grace	Charles E. Russell	Liberal-Conservative	July 3, 1924	C E Russell named to cabinet
Bonavista	Walter S. Monroe	Liberal-Conservative	October 27, 1924	W S Monroe named to cabinet
Bonavista	William C. Winsor	Liberal-Conservative	October 27, 1924	W C Winsor named to cabinet
Burgeo-La Poile	Walter M. Chambers	Liberal-Conservative	October 25, 1926	W M Chambers named to cabinet
Fortune Bay	Harris M. Mosdell	Liberal-Progressive	October 25, 1926	W R Warren named a judge
St. John's East	William E. Brophy	Liberal-Progressive	April 25, 1927	N J Vinnicombe named a liquor commissioner
