= Thomas Bonia =

Newfoundland politician (1856–1926)

The Honourable Captain Thomas Bonia MLC MHA

Minister of Posts and Telegraphs
- In office May 1923 – May 1924
- Prime Minister: Richard Squires; William Warren
- Preceded by: William Halfyard
- Succeeded by: Matthew E. Hawco

Member of the Legislative Council of Newfoundland
- In office May 1923 – September 25, 1926
- Nominated by: Richard Squires
- Appointed by: Charles Alexander Harris

Member of the Newfoundland House of Assembly for Placentia-St. Mary's
- In office November 8, 1900 – November 2, 1908 Serving with Edward Jackman and Richard T. McGrath
- Preceded by: Rhodie Callahan; Michael H. Carty
- Succeeded by: James Davis

Personal details
- Born: 1856 Placentia, Newfoundland Colony
- Died: September 25, 1926 (aged 69–70) St. John's, Newfoundland
- Party: Liberal (1900–1919, 1923–1926); Liberal Reform (1919–1923)
- Spouse: Mary Halley
- Children: 1 daughter
- Occupation: Schooner captain

Thomas Bonia (1856 – September 25, 1926) was a mariner and politician in Newfoundland. He represented Placentia and St. Mary's in the Newfoundland House of Assembly from 1900 to 1908.

== Biography ==
Bonia was born in Placentia in 1855 as the son of Maurice Bonia. He first became involved in the Newfoundland seal hunt as a youth. By 1876, he was master of his own vessel and was involved in the cod fishery in the Strait of Belle Isle and the Grand Banks from 1880 to 1884. In 1894, he became commander of the ship providing mail and passenger service for Placentia Bay. He was elected to the Newfoundland assembly in 1900, reelected in 1904 and retired from politics in 1908. From 1909 to 1923, Bonia served as Inspector of Outport Roads. In April 1923, he was named to the cabinet as Minister of Finance and Customs but did not win election in the general election held in June of that year. Bonia was then appointed to the Legislative Council of Newfoundland and was named Minister of Posts and Telegraphs. He resigned with the rest of the cabinet in July 1923.
