= Halfyard =

Halfyard is a surname. Notable people with the surname include:

- David Halfyard (1931–1996), Kent cricketer
- William Halfyard (1869–1944), Newfoundland politician
