= Isaac Randell =

Newfoundland politician (1871–1942)

The Honourable Captain Isaac Randell MHA MLC
- Randell in 1927

Member of the Legislative Council of Newfoundland
- In office March 29, 1932 – February 16, 1934
- Nominated by: Richard Squires
- Appointed by: John Middleton

Member of the Newfoundland House of Assembly for Trinity Bay
- In office May 3, 1923 – October 30, 1928 Serving with William Halfyard and Richard Hibbs
- Preceded by: John Guppy; Archibald Targett
- Succeeded by: F. Gordon Bradley (as MHA for Trinity Centre)

Personal details
- Born: Isaac Robert Randell; February 15, 1871 Port Rexton, Newfoundland Colony
- Died: January 15, 1942 (aged 70) St. John's, Newfoundland
- Party: Fishermen's Protective Union
- Spouse: Effie Beatrice Taylor (m. 1903)
- Children: 7
- Relatives: Robert Fowler (first cousin)
- Occupation: Master mariner, businessman
- Known for: Commanding the rescue ship SS Bellaventure during the 1914 SS Newfoundland sealing disaster

Isaac Robert Randell (February 15, 1871 – January 15, 1942) was a mariner and politician in Newfoundland. He represented Trinity in the Newfoundland House of Assembly from 1923 to 1928.

The son of John Randell and Mary Fowlow, he was born in Port Rexton and was educated there and at the Navigation School in St. John's. He left school at a young age to work with his father in the Labrador fishery. He earned his mate's certificate in 1892 and his master's certification in 1895. Randell was first given command of a ship in 1895. He later commanded vessels engaged in Arctic exploration for the government of Canada.

Randell was commander of the Bellaventure which rescued 35 members of the crew of the SS Newfoundland who had survived what is now known as the 1914 sealing disaster. The men had endured two nights of freezing rain and blowing snow on the North Atlantic ice fields without shelter or food. One of the rescued men died shortly afterwards in St. John's where the survivors had been brought for medical care. The crew of the Bellaventure also recovered the bodies of 58 men who had not survived the ordeal.

Randell joined A.H. Murray and Co. in 1920, was their agent in Brazil for 14 months and later became a director for the firm.

In 1903, he married Effie Beatrice Taylor. The couple had two sons and five daughters.

Randell was first elected to the Newfoundland assembly in 1923 and was reelected in 1924. He was named to the Legislative Council of Newfoundland in 1931. He died in St. John's in 1942.

== Ship's Commanded ==
- Plymouth
- Belle of the Exe
- SS Regulus
- SS Bellaventure
- SS Bonaventure
- Sheba
- SS Njord
- SS Seal
- SS Sagona
