= John Robert Bennett =

Newfoundland merchant and politician (1866–1941)

The Honourable Sir John R. Bennett KBE
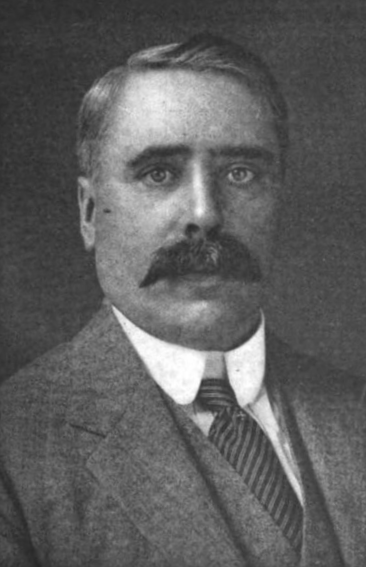

Colonial Secretary
- In office 1924–1928
- Prime Minister: Walter S. Monroe
- Preceded by: William Halfyard
- Succeeded by: Michael S. Sullivan
- In office May 1919 – November 1919
- Prime Minister: Michael Cashin
- Preceded by: William Halfyard
- Succeeded by: Richard Squires
- In office 1913–1917
- Prime Minister: Edward Morris
- Preceded by: Robert Watson
- Succeeded by: Richard Squires

Minister of Finance and Customs
- In office May 2, 1924 – May 7, 1924
- Prime Minister: William Warren
- Preceded by: William H. Cave
- Succeeded by: John Crosbie

Minister of Militia
- In office 1917 – May 1919
- Prime Minister: Edward Morris; William F. Lloyd
- Preceded by: Portfolio established
- Succeeded by: Portfolio abolished
Legislative offices
Member of the Legislative Council of Newfoundland
In office February 7, 1933 – February 16, 1934
Nominated by	Frederick C. Alderdice
Appointed by	Murray Anderson
Member of the Newfoundland House of Assembly for Harbour Grace
In office June 2, 1924 – October 29, 1928 Serving with Albert Hickman and Charles Russell
Preceded by	Archibald Piccott; Ernest Simmons; Augustus Calpin
Succeeded by	Frank Archibald
Member of the Newfoundland House of Assembly for St. John's West
In office October 31, 1904 – May 3, 1923 Serving with Edward Morris (1904–19); John Scott (1904–08); Michael Kennedy (1908–17); Richard Squires (1919–23); Henry J. Brownrigg (1919–23)
Preceded by	John Anderson
Succeeded by	Charles Hunt; Michael Cashin

Personal details
- Born: John Robert Bennett; August 8, 1866 St. John's, Newfoundland Colony
- Died: October 23, 1941 (aged 75) St. John's, Newfoundland
- Party: Liberal (1904–1908); People's (1908–1919); Liberal-Progressive (1919–1923); Liberal-Labour-Progressive (1923–1924); Liberal-Conservative Progressive (1924–1928)
- Spouses: Laura Taylor (m. 1891) Beatrice Shannon Greaves (m. 1936)
- Education: Church of England Academy
- Occupation: Merchant

Sir John Robert Bennett KBE (August 8, 1866 – October 23, 1941) was a merchant and politician in Newfoundland. He represented St. John's West from 1904 to 1923, and Harbour Grace from 1924 to 1928 in the Newfoundland House of Assembly.

== Biography ==
The son of Edward W. Bennett and Amelia Goff, he was born in St. John's and was educated at the Church of England Academy.

Bennett began work with C. F. Bennett & Company in 1881 as a clerk. He later joined his brother's brewing business, later becoming president and managing director. From 1902 to 1906, he served on the St. John's municipal council. He served in the Newfoundland cabinet as Colonial Secretary from 1913 to 1917, and from 1924 to 1928. From 1917 until the end of World War I, Bennett served as Minister of Militia, where he was one of the main points of contact for families inquiring about the statuses of their relatives serving overseas. He organized the Liberal-Progressive Party in 1923 but was defeated when he ran for reelection that year. Bennett was elected to the assembly again in 1924, this time for Harbour Grace.

Bennett was named a Knight Commander of the Order of the British Empire in 1926; also in 1926, he was named District Grand Master of English Freemasonry in Newfoundland.

He was married twice, first to Laura Taylor in 1891 and then to Beatrice Shannon Greaves in 1936.

He died in St. John's on October 23, 1941.
