= 1932 Colonial Building riot =

Anti-corruption and Great Depression riot in Newfoundland

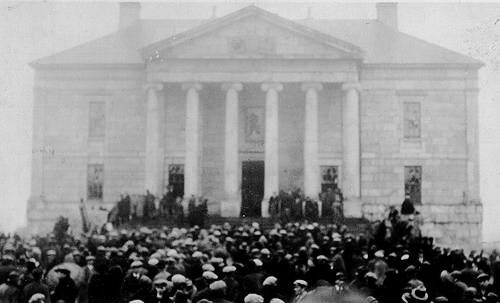
The riot at the Colonial Building in 1932

The Colonial Building riot was a riot that occurred in front of the Colonial Building in St. John's, Newfoundland, on April 5, 1932. Prompted by the Great Depression and corruption in the Squires administration, a peaceful protest degenerated into riots and violence. The riots led to the fall of the Squires government and the defeat of Squires's Liberal Party in the ensuing election in June 1932.

== Background ==
Richard Squires was elected as Prime Minister of Newfoundland in 1928, despite having previously been arrested in a 1923 bribery scandal. Shortly after, the Great Depression arrived in Newfoundland. Newfoundland was hit especially hard by the depression. At the same time, Squires was facing allegations of corruption. His finance minister, Peter John Cashin, resigned in 1932 alleging widespread corruption in Squires' administration and of falsifying minutes to hide secret payments he had received. John Middleton was asked to investigate the charges. His conclusion that there was no sign of falsified records was a major trigger for the riots.

== Riots ==
In the afternoon of April 5, a large crowd of protesters had gathered at the Majestic Theatre for a planned march to the Colonial Building. Beginning with 2,000 people, the protest eventually gained an additional 1,500 as they marched toward the Colonial Building. Upon arrival at the building, protest leaders presented a petition demanding investigation of the corruption charges against Squires. Protestors got impatient waiting for a response to the petition, and some started attempting to break through the doors. When the doors were finally breached, protestors began entering the building and the police attacked everyone they saw with batons, including several uninvolved spectators, both inside and outside the building. In response, protestors began throwing objects through windows, breaking most windows in the building. There were also attempts to set the building on fire, which all failed. Prime Minister Squires exited the building at around 7:30, surrounded by bodyguards, but was found by the crowd, who forced him into a private residence. However, Squires successfully escaped through a back door of the house. Damage was estimated at $10,000.

== Aftermath ==
Squires resigned as Prime Minister while the riot was still in progress and called new elections. In the resulting election, Squires' Liberal Party won a mere two seats, losing to rival party United Newfoundland Party that won most of the seats. This government was dissolved in 1934 and replaced by the Commission of Government, a non-democratic body with representatives chosen by the British Government. Newfoundland would not see another democratic election until after it joined Canada as its tenth province in 1949.

== See also ==
- List of incidents of civil unrest in Canada
