= Museum Association of Newfoundland and Labrador =

- Founded: 1980
- Founder: Volunteer Board of Directors
- Type: Non-profit, charitable organization
- Purpose: Preservation and promotion of material and cultural heritage
- Headquarters: Colonial Building Provincial Historic Site, St. John's, Newfoundland and Labrador, Canada
- Region served: Newfoundland and Labrador, Canada
- Method: Advocacy, membership services, events, and heritage promotion
- Members: 150 member museums and heritage societies; 115 individual members

The Museum Association of Newfoundland and Labrador (MANL) is a non-profit, charitable organization representing institutions and individuals interested in the preservation and promotion of Newfoundland and Labrador's material and cultural heritage. MANL was incorporated in 1980 under the leadership of a volunteer Board of Directors, representative of the museum and heritage community in the province. Since 1980 MANL has grown to include over 150 member museums and heritage societies and 115 individual members. Associate membership is offered to members of the public who support the work of the organization.

In 1982 an office was established with one full-time staff person, and in recent years MANL has had an administrative assistant to help with membership, special events planning and office duties.

In November 2005, the MANL office was relocated from the Newman Building in downtown St. John's, NL to the Colonial Building Provincial Historic Site, also situated in downtown St. John's, NL.
