= Alexander Campbell (Newfoundland politician) =

Newfoundland politician (1875–1940)

The Honourable Alexander Campbell MD MHA

Member of the Newfoundland House of Assembly for St. John's City West
- In office October 29, 1928 – June 11, 1932 Serving with Joseph Fitzgibbon
- Preceded by: John Crosbie; William Browne; William Linegar (as MHAs for St. John's West)
- Succeeded by: Frederick C. Alderdice; Patrick F. Halley (as MHAs for St. John's West)

Member of the Legislative Council of Newfoundland
- In office 1920–1923
- Nominated by: Charles Harris
- Appointed by: George V

Personal details
- Born: July 11, 1875 Prince Edward Island
- Died: May 16, 1940 (aged 64) St. John's, Newfoundland
- Party: Liberal Reform (1919–1923); Liberal (1928–1932)
- Occupation: Physician

Alexander Campbell (July 11, 1875 – May 16, 1940) was a physician, fox rancher and political figure in Newfoundland. He represented St. John's in the Newfoundland House of Assembly from 1928 to 1932.

== Early life ==
Campbell was born on Prince Edward Island. He was educated at Prince of Wales College, McGill University, the Royal College of Physicians of Edinburgh and the University of Vienna. Campbell came to Newfoundland in 1902 and set up practice in Bonne Bay. He moved to St. John's two years later.

== Politics ==
He ran unsuccessfully as a Liberal Reform candidate for a seat in the Newfoundland assembly in 1919. Campbell was named to the Executive Council as Minister of Agriculture and Mines and became a member of the Legislative Council of Newfoundland in 1920. He was accused of misspending government funds, and when Richard Squires refused to remove Campbell from cabinet in 1923, Squires was forced to resign as Prime Minister. A later investigation conducted by Thomas Hollis Walker found that there was some truth to these accusations.

Despite this, Campbell was elected to the Newfoundland assembly in 1928 and was named a minister without portfolio in the Executive Council. Campbell died in St. John's on May 16, 1940.
