= John Middleton (colonial administrator) =

British colonial administrator

Sir John Middleton KCMG KBE
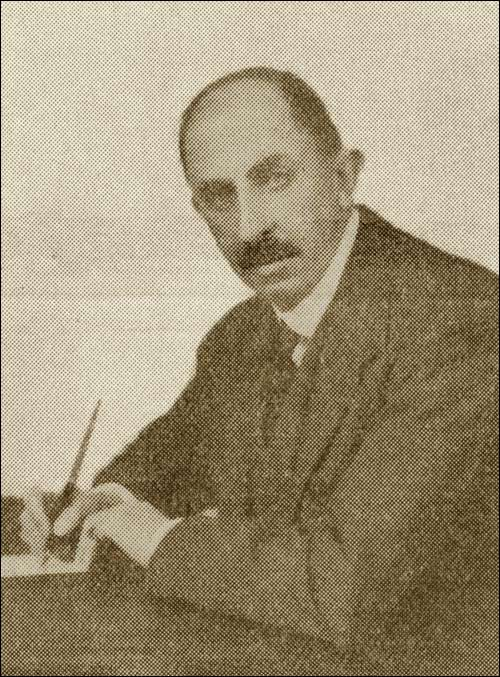

65th Governor of Newfoundland
- In office 1928–1932
- Monarch: George V
- Prime Minister: Frederick C. Alderdice; Sir Richard Squires; Frederick C. Alderdice
- Preceded by: Sir William Allardyce
- Succeeded by: Sir David Murray Anderson

Governor of the Gambia
- In office 10 March 1927 – 29 November 1928
- Monarch: George V
- Preceded by: Cecil Hamilton Armitage
- Succeeded by: Edward Brandis Denham

Governor of the Falkland Islands
- In office 1920–1927
- Monarch: George V
- Preceded by: Sir William Douglas Young
- Succeeded by: Sir Arnold Hodson

Personal details
- Born: 1870
- Died: 5 November 1954 (aged 83–84)

Viceregal styles of Sir John Middleton
- Reference style: His Excellency
- Spoken style: Your Excellency

Sir John Middleton, KBE, CMG (1870 – 5 November 1954) was a British colonial administrator.

Middleton joined the Colonial Office in 1901, serving in south Nigeria for six years as a junior official before moving on to Mauritius until 1920 when he was promoted to governor of the Falkland Islands from 1920 to 1927, Gambia from 1927 to 1928 and Newfoundland from 1928 to 1932.

He was Governor of Newfoundland during a period of acute political crisis that was exacerbated by the Great Depression. In 1932, he was asked to investigate allegations that the Prime Minister of Newfoundland, Sir Richard Squires had falsified cabinet minutes in an attempt to coverup evidence of corruption involving his government. Middleton's conclusions that there was no sign of tampering resulted in a riot outside his office on 5 April 1932 that helped bring down the Squires government. Middleton retired from public life following his term in Newfoundland and returned to England.

Middleton was appointed a Knight Commander of the Order of the British Empire (KBE) in the 1924 Birthday Honours.

== See also ==
- Governors of Newfoundland
- List of people of Newfoundland and Labrador

Government offices
| Preceded by Sir William Douglas Young, KBE, CMG | Governor of the Falkland Islands; 1920–1927 | Succeeded by Sir Arnold Weinholt Hodson, KCMG |
| Preceded by Sir Cecil Hamilton Armitage | Governor of The Gambia; 1927–1928 | Succeeded by Sir Edward Brandis Denham |
| Preceded by Sir William Lamond Allardyce | Dominion Governor of Newfoundland; 1928–1932 | Succeeded by Sir David Murray Anderson |
