= William F. Lloyd =

4th Prime Minister of Newfoundland (1918-1919)

The Right Honourable Sir William F. Lloyd KCMG KC
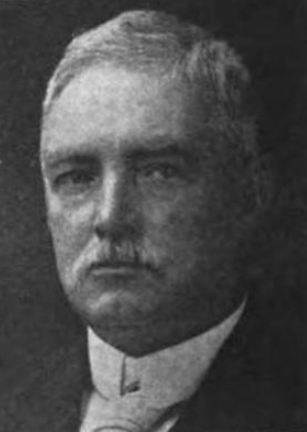
- Lloyd in 1922

4th Prime Minister of Newfoundland
- In office January 5, 1918 – May 22, 1919
- Monarch: George V
- Governor: Charles Alexander Harris
- Preceded by: John Crosbie
- Succeeded by: Michael Patrick Cashin

Member of the Newfoundland House of Assembly for Trinity Bay
- In office October 30, 1913 – November 3, 1919 Serving with John Stone and Archibald Targett
- Preceded by: Edwin Grant; Richard Squires; Robert Watson
- Succeeded by: John Guppy; William Halfyard
- In office October 31, 1904 – November 2, 1908 Serving with George Gushue and Arthur Miller
- Preceded by: William Warren; Robert Watson
- Succeeded by: Robert Watson

Personal details
- Born: William Frederick Lloyd; December 17, 1864 Stockport, Cheshire, England
- Died: June 13, 1937 (aged 72) St. John's, Newfoundland
- Party: Liberal
- Spouse: Agnes Taylor (m. 1886)
- Children: 2 sons
- Occupation: Teacher, journalist, newspaper editor

Sir William Frederick Lloyd KCMG KC DCL (December 17, 1864 – June 13, 1937) was a newspaper editor and Prime Minister of the Dominion of Newfoundland from 1918 to 1919.

Born in Stockport, England, Lloyd emigrated to Newfoundland in 1890 where he taught school before becoming a journalist and becoming editor of The Telegram. He was first elected to the Newfoundland House of Assembly in 1904 as a Liberal and became Leader of the opposition in 1916.

Due to a political crisis over conscription the government of Sir Edward Patrick Morris formed a National Government and invited Lloyd to join as Attorney-General. After Morris retired at the end of 1917, the governor asked Lloyd to form a government even though he was from a minority party. Lloyd took over the National Government but in 1919 his minister of finance, Sir Michael Patrick Cashin, who had succeeded Morris as leader of the Newfoundland People's Party moved a motion of no confidence and defeated the Lloyd government. Cashin became the new prime minister and Lloyd returned to the opposition benches.

In the 1919 New Year Honours, he was named Knight Commander of the Order of St Michael and St George.

Lloyd served again in government, briefly, as minister of justice in 1924.

Lloyd married Agnes Taylor on January 4, 1886. The couple had two sons.

William F. Lloyd died in St. John's on June 13, 1937.
