= William Joseph Browne =

Canadian politician (1897–1989)

The Honourable William Joseph Browne PC QC
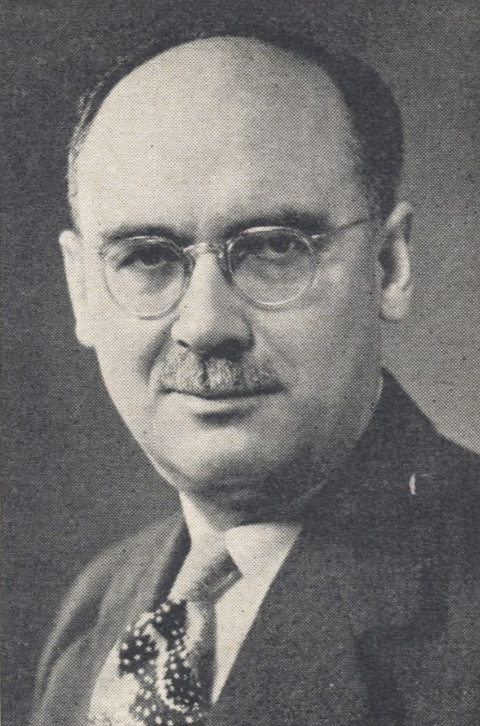
- Browne in 1952

Solicitor General of Canada
- In office October 10, 1960 – August 9, 1962
- Prime Minister: John Diefenbaker
- Preceded by: Léon Balcer
- Succeeded by: John W. MacNaught

Minister without portfolio (Canada)
- In office 1957 – October 10, 1960
- Prime Minister: John Diefenbaker

Minister of Justice and Attorney General (Newfoundland)
- In office 1933 – February 16, 1934
- Prime Minister: Frederick C. Alderdice
- Preceded by: Edward Emerson
- Succeeded by: William R. Howley (as Commissioner of Finance)

Minister of Finance and Customs (Newfoundland)
- In office 1933 – February 16, 1934
- Prime Minister: Frederick C. Alderdice
- Preceded by: James J. Bindon
- Succeeded by: Everard N. R. Trentham (as Commissioner of Finance)
Legislative offices
Member of the Canadian Parliament for St. John's West
In office June 10, 1957 – June 18, 1962
Preceded by	James A. Power
Succeeded by	Richard Cashin
In office June 27, 1949 – August 10, 1953
Preceded by	Riding established
Succeeded by	James A. Power
Member of the Newfoundland House of Assembly for Harbour Main-Bell Island
In office June 11, 1932 – February 16, 1934 Serving with Charles J. Furey
Preceded by	Philip J. Lewis; Albert Walsh (as MHAs for Harbour Main); Joseph Greene (as MHA for Bell Island)
Succeeded by	Ronald Fahey; David Jackman (post-Confederation)
Member of the Newfoundland House of Assembly for St. John's West
In office June 2, 1924 – October 29, 1928 Serving with John Crosbie and William Linegar
Preceded by	Michael Cashin; Charles Hunt; Richard Squires
Succeeded by	Alexander Campbell; Joseph Fitzgibbon (as MHAs for St. John's City West)

Personal details
- Born: May 3, 1897 St. John's, Newfoundland
- Died: January 10, 1989 (aged 91) St. John's, Newfoundland, Canada
- Party: Liberal-Conservative Progressive (1924–1932); United Newfoundland (1932–1934); Progressive Conservative (1949–1962)
- Spouse(s): Mary Grace Harris (m. 1924) Mary Roche (m. 1933) Margaret Fleming (m. 1951) Norah Elphinstone Renouf (m. 1970)
- Education: Merton College, Oxford; University of Toronto; Gray's Inn
- Occupation: Lawyer

William Joseph Browne, PC QC (May 3, 1897 – January 10, 1989) was a Canadian lawyer, judge and politician. He served in the House of Assembly of the Dominion of Newfoundland and the House of Commons of Canada.

== Early life and legal career ==
The son of Liberius Browne and Bridget O'Reilly, he was born in St. John's, Newfoundland and was educated at Holy Cross School, Saint Bonaventure's College, Merton College, Oxford, the University of Toronto and Gray's Inn in London. Browne was called to the bars of both England and Newfoundland in 1922 and practised law in Newfoundland.

== Early political career (1923–1934) ==
Browne ran unsuccessfully for the Placentia-St. Mary's seat in the Newfoundland assembly in 1923. He was elected for St. John's West in 1924 and defeated when he ran for reelection in 1928. He was elected to the assembly again in 1932 for Harbour Main-Bell Island and so was a member of the last Newfoundland House of Assembly in 1933 when the Commission of Government took over governing Newfoundland. He was a cabinet minister in the government of Frederick C. Alderdice, first serving as a minister without portfolio and then as Minister of Finance and Customs and Minister of Justice.

In 1934, he was named King's Counsel. From 1934 to 1939, Browne was a judge in the Central District Court.

== Later political career (1949–1962) ==
In 1949, he was elected to the House of Commons of Canada in the riding of St. John's West. A Progressive Conservative, he was defeated in the 1953 federal election. He was elected again to the House of Assembly in 1954. He was re-elected to the House of Commons in the 1957 and 1958 elections. He was defeated in the 1962 election and again in the 1965 election. From 1957 to 1960, he was a Minister without Portfolio in the cabinet of John Diefenbaker. From 1960 to 1962, he was the Solicitor General of Canada. He retired from politics in 1962 and returned to the practice of law.

In 1981, he published his biography, Eighty-four years a Newfoundlander: Memoirs of William J. Browne (ISBN 0-9690979-0-5).

== Personal life and legacy ==
He was married four times: first to Mary Grace Harris in 1924, to Mary Roche in 1933, to Margaret Fleming (née Buckley) in 1951., and to Dr Norah Elphinstone Renouf in 1970, outliving all his wives except for Norah, who died November 24, 2010.

Browne died in St. John's at the age of 91.

There is a William Joseph Browne fonds at Library and Archives Canada.

Political offices
Preceded by Léon Balcer	Solicitor General of Canada; 1960–1962	Succeeded by John Watson MacNaught
