= John G. Stone =

Newfoundland politician

Honourable John G. Stone MHA
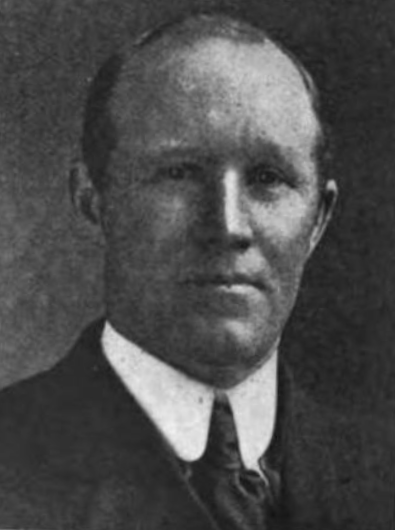

Member of the Newfoundland House of Assembly for Trinity North
- In office June 11, 1932 – January 16, 1934
- Preceded by: William Halfyard
- Succeeded by: Samuel J. Hefferton (post-Confederation)

Member of the Newfoundland House of Assembly for Trinity Bay
- In office October 30, 1913 – November 3, 1919 Serving with Archibald Targett and William F. Lloyd
- Preceded by: John G. Stone; William F. Lloyd
- Succeeded by: John Guppy

Personal details
- Born: John Glover Stone; November 16, 1876; Catalina, Newfoundland Colony
- Died: January 16, 1934 (aged 57); SS Belle Isle, Atlantic Ocean
- Political party: Fishermen's Protective Union (1913–1919); Conservative (1919–1932); United Newfoundland (1932–1934)
- Spouse: Theresa Mills (m. 1905)
- Occupation: Boat builder, merchant

John Glover Stone (November 16, 1876 – January 16, 1934) was a boat builder, merchant and politician in Newfoundland. He represented Trinity from 1913 to 1919 and Trinity North from 1932 to 1934 in the Newfoundland House of Assembly.

== Biography ==
The son of Thomas Stone and Lenora Guy, he was born in Catalina on November 16, 1876. After his father's death in 1891, Stone and his brother Thomas continued to operate the family fishery supply business. He spent several years working in the United States during the early 1900s. He later returned to Catalina and joined the Fishermen's Protective Union (FPU) in 1910. In 1911, he was named manager of the Union Trading Company store in Catalina. A few years later, Stone had become inspector for all the company's branch stores. He served as Minister of Marine and Fisheries from 1917 to 1919. Because he joined the cabinet of Michael Cashin in 1919, he was considered a traitor by the FPU and was defeated when he ran for reelection in 1919 and 1923.

Stone did not run for reelection in 1924. He then worked as manager of a fish curing plant at Badger's Quay, Bonavista Bay. In 1928, he was named Minister of Marine and Fisheries in Frederick Alderdice's cabinet. He was defeated however when he ran for election in Trinity North and returned to his job at the fish curing plant. He was elected for Trinity North in 1932 as a member of the United Newfoundland Party and was named to cabinet as Minister of Marine and Fisheries. Stone died in office while travelling by ship from Newfoundland to New York City.

== Personal life ==
He married Theresa Mills in September 1905.
