= William Linegar =

Newfoundland politician

William Linegar MHA

Member of the Newfoundland House of Assembly for St. John's West
- In office June 2, 1924 – October 29, 1928 Serving with John Crosbie and William Browne
- Preceded by: Charles Hunt; Michael Cashin; Richard Squires
- Succeeded by: Alexander Campbell; Joseph Fitzgibbon (as MHAs for St. John's City West)

Personal details
- Born: 1871 St. John's, Newfoundland Colony
- Died: February 4, 1951 (aged 79–80) St. John's, Newfoundland, Canada
- Party: Workingmen's Party (1919); Liberal-Labour-Progressive (1923); Liberal-Conservative Progressive (1924–1928)
- Spouse: Ida May Duder (m. 1902)
- Children: 10
- Occupation: Cooper

William L. Linegar (1871 – February 4, 1951) was a cooper, union leader and politician in Newfoundland. He represented St. John's West in the Newfoundland House of Assembly from 1924 to 1928.

== Early life and union activism ==
Linegar was one of five children born in St. John's to Michael Linegar and Eliza Cole. He married Ida May Duder at St. Patrick’s Church in April 1902. They had 10 children born between 1902-1918. Sometime after 1906, he became president of the Cooper's Union.

== Politics and later life ==
He ran unsuccessfully for a seat in the Newfoundland assembly as a Workingmen's Party candidate in 1919. He was defeated in a subsequent by-election and again in 1923 before being elected in 1924 as a Liberal-Conservative. In 1928, Linegar was named to the Board of Liquor Control. He became president of the Cooper's Union again in 1938.
