= William Halfyard =

Newfoundland politician (1869–1944)

The Honourable William Halfyard MHA
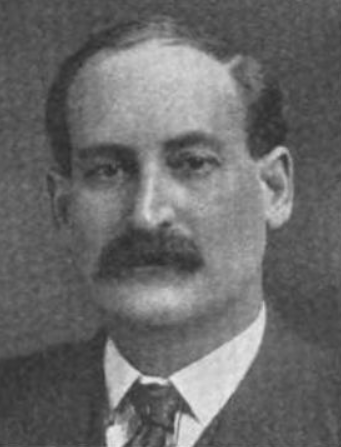
- Halfyard in 1922

Minister of Posts and Telegraphs
- In office 1928–1932
- Prime Minister: Richard Squires
- Preceded by: William Woodford
- Succeeded by: William C. Winsor
- In office 1919–1923
- Prime Minister: Richard Squires
- Preceded by: John A. Robinson
- Succeeded by: Thomas Bonia

Colonial Secretary
- In office May 7, 1924 – June 2, 1924
- Prime Minister: Albert Hickman
- Preceded by: William J. Higgins
- Succeeded by: John R. Bennett
- In office 1923–1924
- Prime Minister: William Warren
- Preceded by: Richard Squires
- Succeeded by: William J. Higgins
- In office 1918–1919
- Prime Minister: William F. Lloyd
- Preceded by: Richard Squires
- Succeeded by: John R. Bennett

Minister of Marine and Fisheries
- In office May 1923 – July 1923
- Prime Minister: Richard Squires
- Preceded by: William Coaker
- Succeeded by: George F. Grimes

Minister of Agriculture and Mines
- In office 1917–1918
- Prime Minister: William F. Lloyd
- Preceded by: Sidney Blandford
- Succeeded by: William J. Walsh
Legislative offices
Member of the Newfoundland House of Assembly for Trinity North
In office October 29, 1928 – June 11, 1932
Preceded by	District established
Succeeded by	John G. Stone
Member of the Newfoundland House of Assembly for Trinity Bay
In office November 3, 1919 – October 29, 1928 Serving with John Guppy (1919–23); Archibald Targett (1919–23); Richard Hibbs (1923–24); Isaac Randell (1923–28); Edwin Godden (1924–28)
Preceded by	John G. Stone; William F. Lloyd
Succeeded by	District abolished
Member of the Newfoundland House of Assembly for Fogo
In office October 30, 1913 – November 3, 1919
Preceded by	Henry Earle
Succeeded by	Richard Hibbs

Personal details
- Born: William Wesley Halfyard; October 16, 1869 Ochre Pit Cove, Newfoundland Colony
- Died: December 31, 1944 (aged 75) St. John's, Newfoundland
- Party: Fishermen's Protective Union
- Spouse: Margaret Mary Diamond (m. 1909)
- Occupation: Educator

William Wesley Halfyard (October 16, 1869 – December 31, 1944) was an educator and political figure in the Colony of Newfoundland. He represented Fogo from 1913 to 1919, Trinity Bay from 1919 to 1928 and Trinity North from 1928 to 1932 in the Newfoundland House of Academy.

He was born in Ochre Pit Cove, Conception Bay, the son of William Halfyard and Anne Carnell. Halfyard was educated in Ochre Pit Cove and St. John's. He taught school for several years, later becoming principal of the Methodist school in Catalina, where he became involved with the Fishermen's Protective Union. Halfyard served in the Newfoundland Executive Council as Minister of Agriculture and Mines from 1917 to 1919, as Minister of Posts and Telegraphs from 1919 to 1923 and again from 1928 to 1932, as Minister of Marine and Fisheries in 1923 and as Colonial Secretary from 1923 to 1924. After he retired from politics in 1932, he was named Sheriff of Newfoundland.

Halfyard also served as vice-president of the Union Trading Company, as a member of the board of governors for St. John's General Hospital and as a director of the Government Savings Bank. In 1909, he married Margaret Mary Diamond. He died at home in St. John's at the age of 75.
