= Michael Patrick Cashin =

5th Prime Minister of Newfoundland (1919)

The Right Honourable Sir Michael Cashin KBE
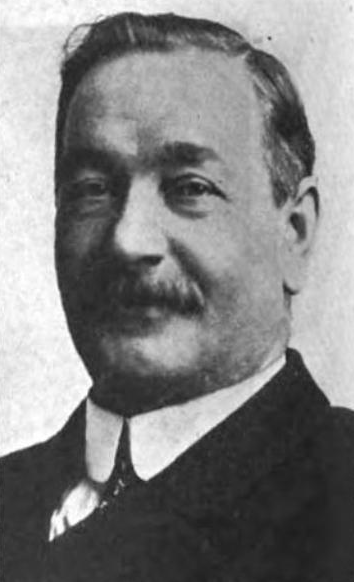
- Cashin in 1922

5th Prime Minister of Newfoundland
- In office May 22, 1919 – November 17, 1919
- Monarch: George V
- Governor: Charles Alexander Harris
- Preceded by: William F. Lloyd
- Succeeded by: Richard Squires

Member of the Newfoundland House of Assembly for St. John's West
- In office May 3, 1923 – June 2, 1924 Serving with Charles Hunt and Richard Squires
- Preceded by: Henry J. Brownrigg; John R. Bennett
- Succeeded by: William J. Browne; John Crosbie; William Linegar

Member of the Newfoundland House of Assembly for Placentia and St. Mary's
- In office November 6, 1893 – May 3, 1923 Serving with Daniel Greene (1893–1897); George Shea (1897–1900); James D. Ryan (1900–1904); William Ellis (1904–1909); Philip F. Moore (1909–1923)
- Preceded by: George Shea
- Succeeded by: Peter Cashin

Personal details
- Born: September 29, 1864 Cape Broyle, Newfoundland Colony
- Died: August 30, 1926 (aged 61) St. John's, Newfoundland
- Party: Liberal (1893–1905); Conservative (1905–1908); People's (1908–1919); Liberal-Progressive (1919–1923); Liberal-Labour-Progressive (1923–1924)
- Spouse: Gertrude Mullowney (m. 1888)
- Children: 5 (including Peter)
- Relatives: Richard Cashin (grandson); Cyril J. Fox (son-in-law)
- Education: Saint Bonaventure's College
- Profession: Businessman

Sir Michael Patrick Cashin KBE (September 29, 1864 – August 30, 1926) was a Newfoundland businessman and politician.

He was elected to the legislature in 1893 as an independent but worked closely with the Liberal Party. In 1907 he joined the Newfoundland People's Party of Sir Edward Patrick Morris and became minister of finance in 1909. When Morris resigned as party leader, Cashin succeeded him. The People's Party had formed a wartime national government which opposition member William F. Lloyd, a Liberal, had joined as minister of justice.

Despite the fact that Cashin had succeeded Morris as leader of the dominant party, the governor appointed Lloyd to the position of prime minister. On May 20, 1919, Cashin, who was still minister of finance, rose and moved a motion of no confidence in the government he was a member of. The motion passed and Cashin became prime minister.

Cashin's government was short-lived, however; the House of Assembly had not seen an election for six years due to the First World War, and a return to the polls was long overdue. An election was held in November 1919 which defeated Cashin's government and elected the opposition Liberals (now called the Liberal Reform Party).

In opposition Cashin changed the name of the People's Party to the Liberal-Labour-Progressive Party before retiring as party leader in 1923. He did not run for re-election in 1924.

Cashin's son, Peter John Cashin, was a prominent Newfoundland politician in his own right and his grandson, Richard Cashin was a federal politician in the 1960s and a trade union leader in the 1970s and 1980s.

He was created a Knight Commander of the Order of the British Empire in 1918.

He died at his home in St. John's on August 30, 1926.

Political offices
Preceded by William F. Lloyd	Prime Minister of Newfoundland; 1919	Succeeded by Sir Richard Squires
