= George F. Grimes =

Newfoundland businessman and politician

Honourable George F. Grimes MHA

Member of the Newfoundland House of Assembly for Lewisporte
- In office October 29, 1928 – August 10, 1929
- Preceded by: District established
- Succeeded by: Helena Squires

Member of the Newfoundland House of Assembly for Twillingate
- In office June 2, 1924 – October 29, 1928 Serving with Kenneth M. Brown and Thomas Ashbourne
- Preceded by: Arthur Barnes; George Jones
- Succeeded by: Kenneth M. Brown

Member of the Newfoundland House of Assembly for Fogo
- In office May 3, 1923 – June 2, 1924
- Preceded by: Richard Hibbs
- Succeeded by: Richard Hibbs

Member of the Newfoundland House of Assembly for Port de Grave
- In office October 30, 1913 – November 3, 1919
- Preceded by: William Warren
- Succeeded by: John Crosbie

Personal details
- Born: George Frederick Arthur Grimes; June 29, 1877 Channel, Newfoundland Colony
- Died: August 10, 1929 (aged 52) St. John's, Newfoundland
- Party: Fishermen's Protective Union
- Spouse: Annie Clarke (m. 1900)
- Occupation: Clerk

George Frederick Arthur Grimes (June 29, 1877 – August 10, 1929) was a businessman and political figure in the Dominion of Newfoundland. He represented Port de Grave from 1913 to 1919, Fogo from 1923 to 1924, Twillingate from 1924 to 1928 and Lewisporte from 1928 to 1929 in the Newfoundland House of Assembly.

== Early life and socialist activism ==
He was born in Channel, the son of William Grimes and Amelia White. The family moved to St. John's when Grimes was twelve after his father, a policeman, was posted there. He was employed as a clerk from 1890 until 1902, when he became a department manager for retail firm George Knowling Limited. In 1900, he married Annie Clarke. In 1906, Grimes helped form the Newfoundland Socialist Society; he also served as financial secretary for the St John's Trades and Labour Council in 1908. He is credited with exposing a future Newfoundland prime minister Joey Smallwood to socialism.

== Fishermen's Protective Union and politics ==
A supporter of the Fishermen's Protective Union (FPU), Grimes became manager of the dry goods department in the Union Trading Company in 1912. In 1913, he was elected to the House of Assembly in Port de Grave as a representative of the FPU. In 1914, Grimes helped form the Newfoundland Socialist League. He was invited to become a member of the Executive Council in 1917 and served on Newfoundland's board of food control during World War I. Grimes was defeated by John Chalker Crosbie when he ran for reelection in 1919. He was elected again in 1923 as a member for Fogo, and he served in the cabinet as Minister of Marine and Fisheries from 1923 to 1924. Grimes died in office in St. John's at the age of 52 after suffering an "apoplectic attack".
