= Richard Hibbs =

Newfoundland farmer, journalist and politician (1876–1940)

The Honourable Richard Hibbs MHA

Member of the Newfoundland House of Assembly for Fogo
- In office June 2, 1924 – June 11, 1932
- Preceded by: George F. Grimes
- Succeeded by: Harold Earle
- In office November 3, 1919 – May 3, 1923
- Preceded by: William Halfyard
- Succeeded by: George F. Grimes

Member of the Newfoundland House of Assembly for Trinity Bay
- In office May 3, 1923 – June 2, 1924 Serving with William Halfyard and Isaac Randell
- Preceded by: John Guppy; Archibald Targett
- Succeeded by: Edwin J. Godden

Personal details
- Born: 1876 Kelligrews, Newfoundland Colony
- Died: September 9, 1940 (aged 63–64) Kelligrews, Newfoundland
- Party: Fishermen's Protective Union
- Occupation: Journalist, farmer

Richard Hibbs (1876 – September 9, 1940) was a farmer, journalist and political figure in the Colony of Newfoundland. He represented Fogo from 1919 to 1923 and from 1924 to 1932 and Trinity Bay in 1923 as a member of the Fishermen's Protective Union.

== Biography ==
He was born in Riverdale, Kelligrews and was educated there. He organized a Farmer's Protective Association in 1912, later becoming active in the Fishermen's Protective Union. Hibbs was a reporter for the Evening Advocate, editor for the Morning Advocate and was business manager for the Union Publishing Company from 1916 to 1924. During his time in the assembly, he served as editor of Hansard. He was a member of the Executive Council, serving as Minister of Public Works in 1923. Hibbs also held the Public Works portfolio, no longer a cabinet post, from 1928 to 1932. In 1924, he became publisher of the Daily Globe. Hibbs was editor of Who's Who in and from Newfoundland in 1927, 1930 and 1937. After he retired from politics, he was superintendent for the penitentiary at St. John's and a commissioner in the Supreme Court of Newfoundland. He died in Kelligrews in 1940.
