= James MacDonnell (Newfoundland politician) =

Canadian politician

James Ronald MacDonnell (1890 – November 25, 1924) was an educator and politician in Newfoundland. He represented St. George's in the Newfoundland House of Assembly from 1919 to 1923.

The son of Richard MacDonnell, he was born in Harbour Main and was educated at Saint Bonaventure's College, at the National College of Ireland in Dublin and at King's Inns in Dublin. MacDonnell taught school in Torbay before going to Ireland to continue his education. He returned to Newfoundland as assistant superintendent of Roman Catholic schools. MacDonnell married Stella Pieroway.

After being elected in 1919, he was offered the position of Minister of Agriculture but declined and sat in opposition. During his time in the assembly, MacDonnell opposed giving the vote to women. He was defeated when he ran for reelection in 1923. MacDonnell's health declined soon after he returned to farming and he died in St. John's the following year.
