= Albert Hickman =

Businessman and 8th Prime Minister of Newfoundland (1924-1924)

The Right Honourable Albert Hickman
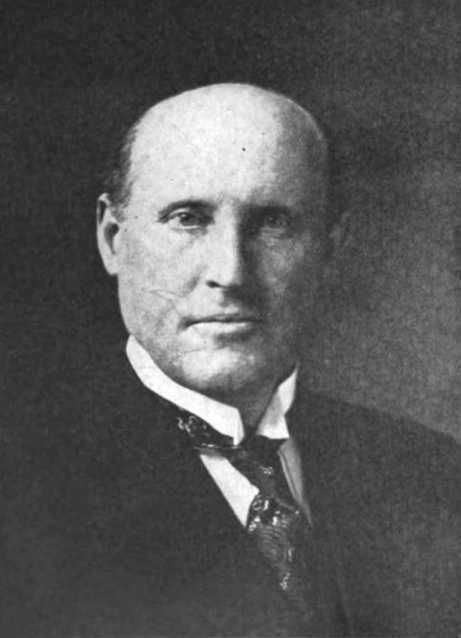

8th Prime Minister of Newfoundland
- In office May 10, 1924 – June 9, 1924
- Monarch: George V
- Governor: William Allardyce
- Preceded by: William Warren
- Succeeded by: Walter Stanley Monroe
Legislative offices
Member of the Newfoundland House of Assembly for Harbour Grace
In office June 2, 1924 – October 29, 1928 Serving with John R. Bennett and Charles Russell
Preceded by	Archibald Piccott; Ernest Simmons; Augustus Calpin
Succeeded by	Frank C. Archibald
Member of the Newfoundland House of Assembly for Bay de Verde
In office October 30, 1913 – November 3, 1919 Serving with John Crosbie
Preceded by	Jesse Whiteway
Succeeded by	Frederick LeGrow; William H. Cave

Personal details
- Born: Albert Edgar Hickman; August 2, 1875 Grand Bank, Newfoundland Colony
- Died: February 9, 1943 (aged 67) St. John's, Newfoundland
- Resting place: General Protestant Cemetery, St. John's, Newfoundland
- Party: People's (1913–1919); Liberal-Labour-Progressive (1923); Liberal-Progressive (1924–1928)
- Spouse: Mary Louise Laurie (m. 1906)
- Education: Mount Allison University
- Profession: Businessman

Albert Edgar Hickman (August 2, 1875 – February 9, 1943) was the seventeenth Prime Minister of Newfoundland.

== Biography ==
Albert Hickman was born in Grand Bank on August 2, 1875. He married Mary Louise Laurie on December 24, 1906, and they had three children.

A politician and businessman, he served as Prime Minister of Newfoundland for 33 days in 1924 as leader of a caretaker administration after the successive collapses of the Liberal Reform Party governments of Prime Ministers Sir Richard Squires and William Warren. The governor asked Hickman to form an administration to govern the province when the government of William Warren was defeated in a Motion of No Confidence. Hickman invited members of various former members of the Liberal Reform Party as well as members of other parties into his government which he called the Liberal-Progressive Party. His new party was defeated in the 9 June 1924 election by former supporters of Warren who joined with the conservative opposition to form the Liberal-Conservative Progressive Party. Hickman served as Leader of the Opposition until he retired from politics in 1928, by which time his party had degenerated and a new Liberal Party had emerged led by Squires.

Albert Hickman died at his home in St. John's on February 9, 1943.

Political offices
Preceded by William Warren	Prime Minister of Newfoundland; 1924	Succeeded by Walter Stanley Monroe
