= Harvey Small =

Politician in Newfoundland

Harvey H. Small (died 1965) was a politician in Newfoundland. He represented Burgeo and LaPoile in the Newfoundland House of Assembly from 1919 to 1924.

The son of Joseph H. Small, he was born in Burgeo and joined the Royal Newfoundland Regiment in 1914 at the start of World War I. He was discharged in 1919, having reached the rank of lieutenant. He was hired by Harvey & Co. Small was elected to the Newfoundland assembly in 1919 and 1923 but defeated in 1924. He was manager of Harvey & Co.'s branch in Corner Brook until 1933. After that, he worked as a commercial agent and manufacturer's agent in western Newfoundland.
