= John Chalker Crosbie =

Newfoundland merchant and politician (1876–1932)

The Right Honourable Sir John Chalker Crosbie KBE
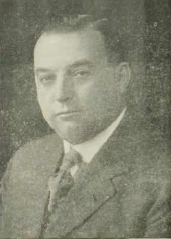
- Crosbie in 1924

3rd Prime Minister of Newfoundland
- In office December 31, 1917 – January 5, 1918
- Monarch: George V
- Governor: Charles Alexander Harris
- Preceded by: Edward Morris
- Succeeded by: William Lloyd
Legislative offices
Member of the Newfoundland House of Assembly for St. John's West
In office June 2, 1924 – October 29, 1928 Serving with William J. Browne and William Linegar
Preceded by	Michael Cashin; Charles Hunt; Richard Squires
Succeeded by	Alexander Campbell; Joseph Fitzgibbon (as MHAs for St. John's City West)
Member of the Newfoundland House of Assembly for Port de Grave
In office November 3, 1919 – May 3, 1923
Preceded by	George Grimes
Succeeded by	Harry A. Winter
Member of the Newfoundland House of Assembly for Bay de Verde
In office November 2, 1908 – November 3, 1919 Serving with Jesse Whiteway (1908–1913); Albert Hickman (1913–1919)
Preceded by	Charles H. Hutchings; William C. Winsor
Succeeded by	William H. Cave; Frederick LeGrow

Personal details
- Born: September 11, 1876 Brigus, Newfoundland Colony
- Died: October 5, 1932 (aged 56) St. John’s, Newfoundland
- Party: People’s (1908–1919); Liberal-Progressive (1919–1923); Liberal-Labour-Progressive (1923–1924); Liberal-Conservative Progressive (1924–1928)
- Spouse: Mitchie Ann Manuel (m. 1899)
- Children: 13 (including Chesley and Vera)
- Relatives: John Crosbie (grandson); Ches Crosbie (great-grandson)

Sir John Chalker Crosbie KBE (September 11, 1876 – October 5, 1932) was a Newfoundland merchant and politician. Elected to the House of Assembly in 1908, he would go on to serve as Prime Minister of Newfoundland for six days and later as a minister in two administrations.

== Early life and business career ==
Crosbie was born on September 11, 1876 in Brigus as the son of George Graham Crosbie and Martha Ellen (née Chalker). An aggressive and energetic entrepreneur, he created a fortune (which he lost) and started the Crosbie dynasty. His son, Chesley Crosbie, and grandson, John Crosbie were both affluent politicians. In 1900 Crosbie founded Crosbie and Co. and by 1920 was one of the leading fish exporters in Newfoundland.

== Politics ==
He entered politics as MHA for Bay de Verde in 1908. After Edward Morris resigned at the end of 1917, Crosbie served as Prime Minister in a caretaker capacity until 5 January 1918, when William Lloyd took office. He was Minister of Shipping in 1919 and Minister of Finance and Customs under Prime Minister Walter Monroe from 1924 to 1928.

Crosbie was knighted KBE in 1919.

Political offices
Preceded by Edward Morris	Prime Minister of Newfoundland; 1917-1918	Succeeded by William Lloyd
