= Charles Alexander Harris =

British colonial administrator

Sir Charles Alexander Harris KCMG CB CVO
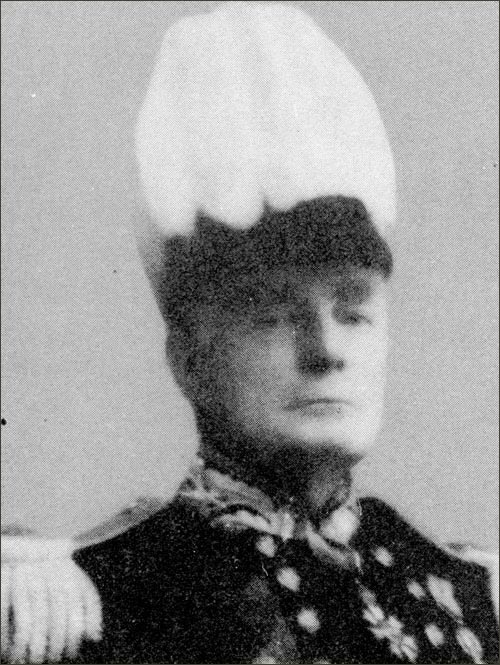
- Portrait of Sir Charles Alexander Harris

Governor of Newfoundland
- In office 1917–1922
- Monarch: George V
- Prime Minister: Edward Morris; John Chalker Crosbie; William F. Lloyd; Michael Patrick Cashin; Richard Squires
- Preceded by: Walter Edward Davidson
- Succeeded by: William Allardyce

Personal details
- Born: 28 June 1855 Wrexham, Denbighshire, Wales, UK
- Died: 26 March 1947 (aged 91)
- Relations: Stanley Harris (son)
- Education: Christ's College, Cambridge

Viceregal styles of Sir Charles Alexander Harris
- Reference style: His Excellency
- Spoken style: Your Excellency

Sir Charles Alexander Harris KCMG CB CVO (28 June 1855 – 26 March 1947) was a British colonial administrator, Governor of Newfoundland from 1917 to 1922.

Harris was born in Wrexham, Wales, but spent much of his first ten years in St. John's, Newfoundland, where his father, the Rev. George Poulett Harris, moved when Charles was a boy. Harris began his schooling in Newfoundland before returning to England where he attended Richmond School in Yorkshire.

Harris graduated from Christ's College, Cambridge, in 1878 and qualified for the bar at Lincoln's Inn. He began his career as a clerk in the Colonial Office in 1879.

From 1896 to 1899, he worked on a Boundary Arbitration between British Guiana and Venezuela, for which he was appointed a Companion of the Order of St Michael and St George (CMG) in the 1900 New Year Honours list on 1 January 1900, and was invested by Queen Victoria at Windsor Castle on 1 March 1900. From 1901 to 1904 he worked on another boundary commission between British Guiana and Brazil.

Harris became Chief Clerk of the Colonial Office in 1917. The same year, he was knighted and appointed governor of Newfoundland. Harris wrote essays on the history of Newfoundland and was a contributor to the Dictionary of National Biography. He was offered the position of Governor-General of Australia but turned it down in favour of retiring from the colonial service in 1922 at the end of his term as Governor of Newfoundland.

In 1928 he edited for the Hakluyt Society Robert Harcourt's A Relation of a Voyage to Guiana by Robert Harcourt 1613.

Preceded by Sir Walter Davidson	Governor of Newfoundland; 1917–1922	Succeeded by Sir William Allardyce
