= William Jones (Newfoundland politician) =

Newfoundland politician

Dr. William Edgar Jones (January 23, 1873 – February 16, 1930) was a physician and politician in Newfoundland. He represented Harbour Main in the Newfoundland House of Assembly from 1919 to 1923 as a Liberal-Progressive member.

The son of Michael Jones, he was born in Harbour Grace and was educated at Saint Bonaventure's College and the University of Maryland. After completing his medical education in 1894, Jones set up practice in Avondale. In 1895, he married Teresa English. In 1913, with Louis Lawton, Jones established the Wabana Drug Company. He was elected to the Newfoundland assembly in 1919 and made an unsuccessful attempt for reelection in 1923 as an independent.
