= George Jones (Newfoundland politician) =

Newfoundland politician

George Jones (1867 – June 1949) was a master mariner, magistrate and politician in Newfoundland. He represented Twillingate in the Newfoundland House of Assembly from 1919 to 1924.

The son of Thomas Jones and Virtue Anstey, he was born in Little Bay Islands and was educated there. Jones began fishing in 1878 and, from 1886 to 1920, was a captain of fishing and coasting schooners. For six years during that period, he was a superintendent for lobster packing plants. Jones joined the Fishermen's Protective Union in 1913. He was elected to the Newfoundland assembly in 1919 and re-elected in 1923. When Richard Squires resigned as Newfoundland premier, Jones supported the government formed by William Warren. However, in April 1924, Jones and Richard Cramm left the government to support Squires. After two other members withdrew their support from Warren, the government fell on a motion of no confidence. Jones did not run for reelection but instead returned to fishing.

In 1890, he married Martha Wiseman. The couple had five children.

He was named stipendiary magistrate for Green Bay in 1929 and served until he retired in 1935. Jones died at Little Bay Islands in 1949.
