= Colonial Building =

Historic building in St. John's, Newfoundland, Canada

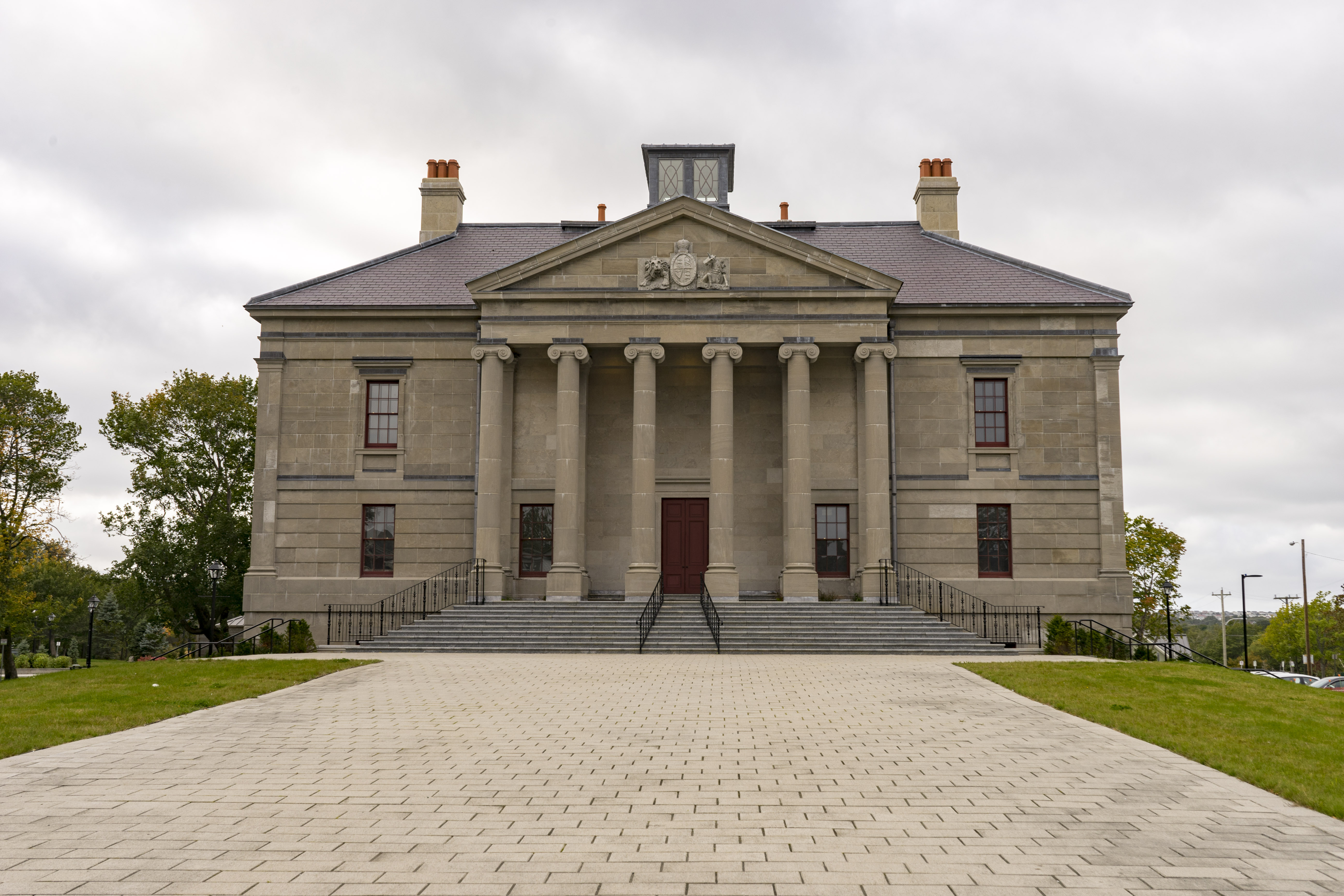

General information
- Architectural style: Neoclassical
- Location: Military Road; St. John's, Newfoundland and Labrador, Canada
- Coordinates: 47°34′15.34″N 52°42′24.44″W
- Construction started: 24 May 1847
- Completed: 1850
- Cost: £18,335

Design and construction
- Architect: James Purcell
- Engineer: Patrick Keough

The Colonial Building is a historic government building located in St. John's, Newfoundland and Labrador, Canada. The building was the home of the colonial and later provincial Newfoundland government and the House of Assembly from January 28, 1850 to July 28, 1959. In 1974, it was declared a Provincial Historic Site.

In 1832 when the Colony of Newfoundland governed itself by representative government there was not a formal building assigned to house the legislature. The first home of the legislature was a tavern and lodging house on Duckworth Street owned and operated by a Mrs. Mary Travers. The stay was brief as in the legislature's haste and inexperience it forgot to vote approval for the funds to pay rent. The first building was destroyed in city fire of 1846. For the next seventeen years they would meet in various temporary quarters including the local courthouse. In 1846 an act was approved authorizing the construction of the Colonial Building as a permanent home.

On May 24, 1847, the cornerstone was laid by the Governor, Major-General Sir John Gaspar Le Marchant. The official opening of the Colonial Building took place on January 28, 1850, by Governor Le Marchant for the second session of the House's fourth general assembly.

== Construction ==
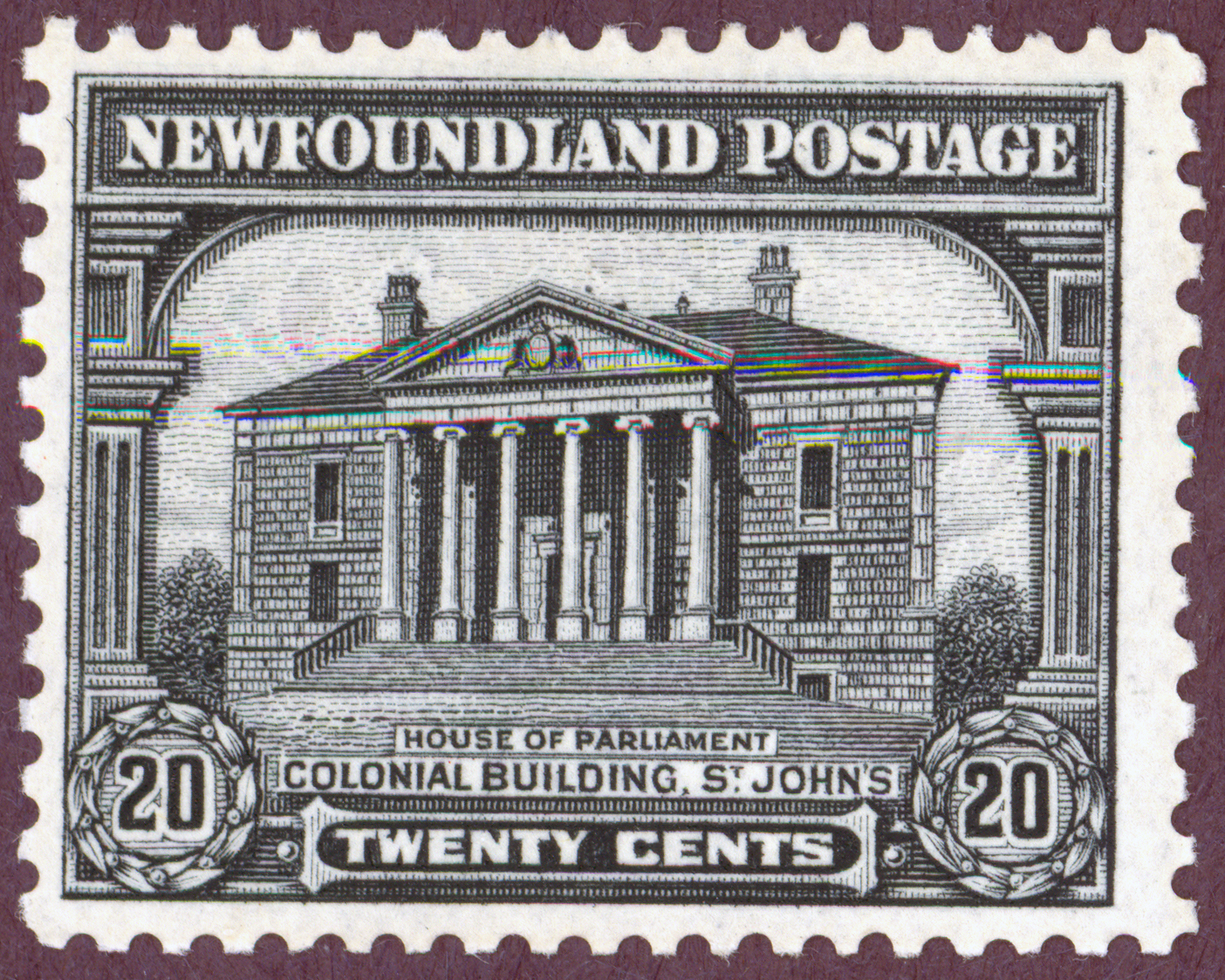
Colonial Building on a postage stamp of 1928

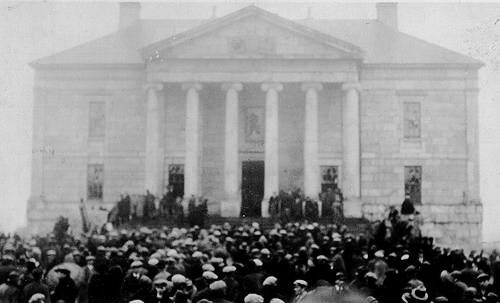
The riot at Colonial Building in 1932

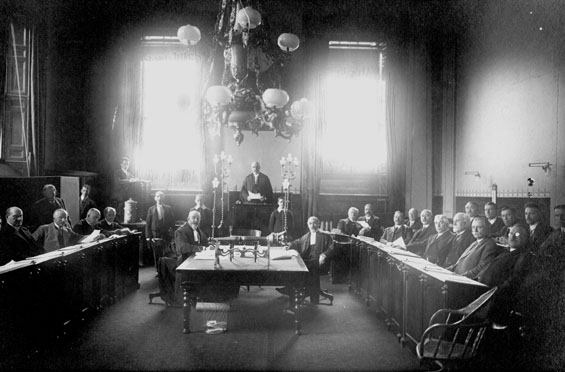
Newfoundland House of Assembly, ca. 1914

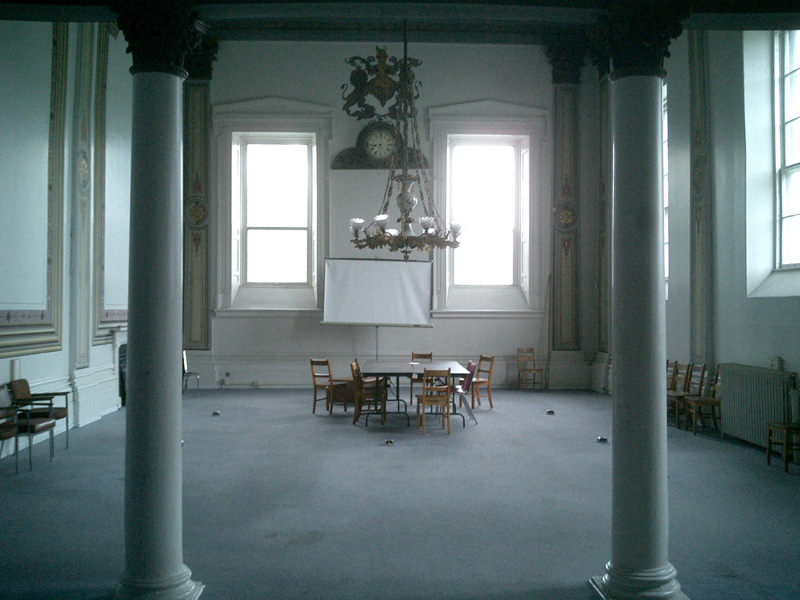
Colonial Building chamber, 2006

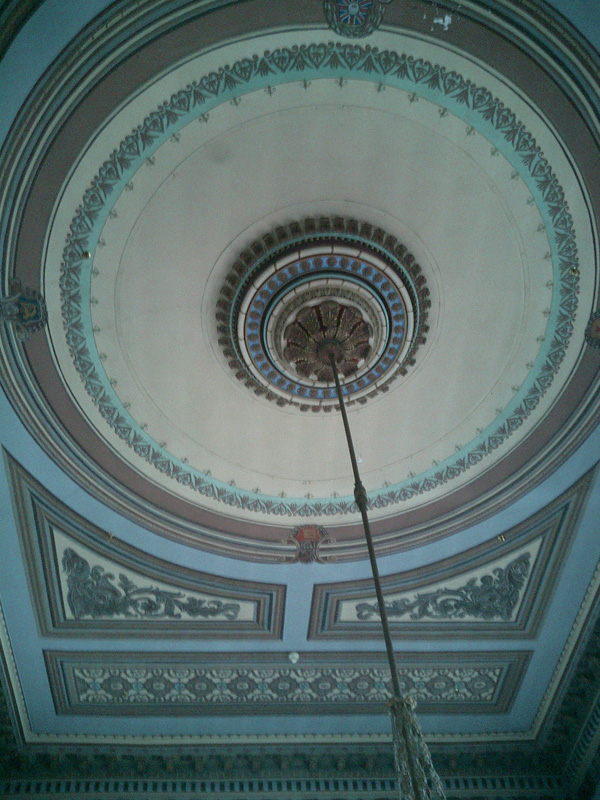
Colonial Building chamber ceiling, 2006

James Purcell was the main architect and Patrick Keough was the contractor. Colonial Building, built in the style of neoclassical was constructed of white limestone specially imported from Little Island, Cork, Ireland. The facade features a massive portico consisting of six ionic columns supporting an entablature triangular pediment. The pediment is decorated with the Royal Arms sculpted in deep relief. The interior hall is screened with ionic columns supporting a quadrangular lantern dome. the two legislative chambers, each with a ceiling height of twenty eight feet, are decorated with corinthian pilasters. The whole structure was built at a cost of £18,335.

In 1880 Alexander Pindikowski, a Polish fresco painter, then serving a 15-month prison sentence for forgery received a one-month reduction in his sentence for the immaculate fresco painting work he completed at both Colonial Building and Government House.

Worthy of note is the fact that the governing party had chosen to sit on the left side of the House of Assembly as opposed to the traditional right side of the speaker because that's where the heaters were located, and it was the warmest part of the house. To this day the ruling party in the Newfoundland and Labrador House of Assembly continues to sit on the left side of the speaker of the house.

== Historic events ==
It was the site where responsible government was given Newfoundland in 1855. It was at this building that Newfoundland entered in the Commission of Government in 1934 and the location of the Newfoundland National Convention from 1946–1948 then in 1949 when Newfoundland entered into Confederation with Canada.

It was also the site of a number of political riots and disturbances. One of those was the public protest on April 5, 1932, for maladministration and corruption in government when all the windows were broken, doors smashed and furniture destroyed, which cost $10,000 to repair. The prime minister, Sir Richard Squires, barely escaped the building at that time.

The building was also the site of Newfoundland's first bank robbery, in 1850. Besides the legislative chambers, the Colonial Building contained offices, apartments for the caretaker and legislative librarian, and the Newfoundland Savings Bank. On the night of November 30, 1850, thieves broke in to the Colonial Treasurer's office through a ground floor window and stole £413 from an iron chest belonging to the Savings Bank. A £100 reward and pardon to accomplices was offered for information leading to an arrest. Two men, James Kavanagh and Michael Whelan, were caught, convicted and most of the money was recovered. Legislative librarian Sarah Perchard eventually received the reward, after petitioning the Governor .

On July 28, 1959, the provincial legislature had its last working session in the building before relocating to the newly completed Confederation Building on Prince Philip Drive.

== Restoration ==
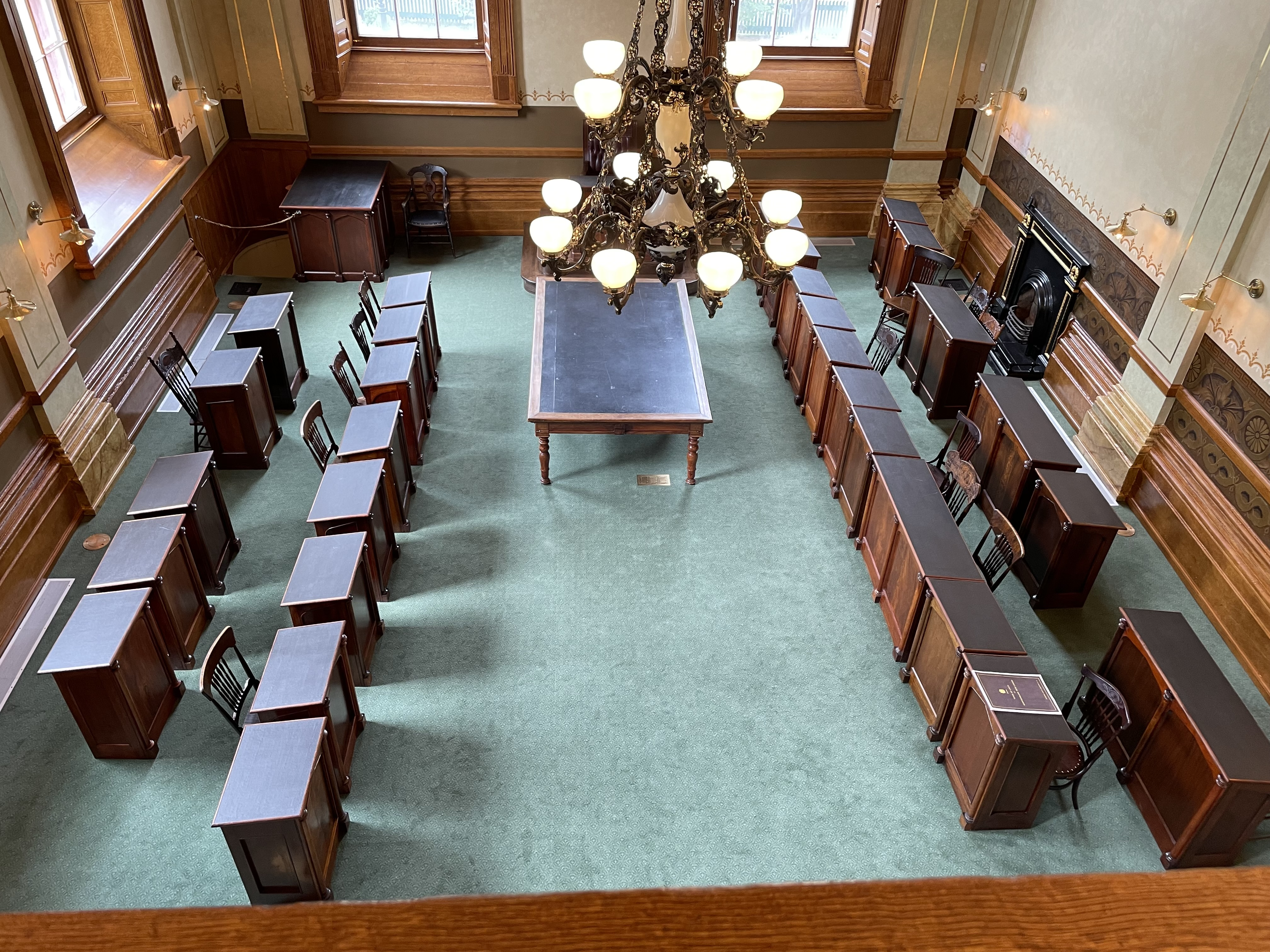
View of the Lower Chamber in 2024

From 2010 to 2015 restoration work in the interior of building was undertaken to stabilize and restore the ceilings of the two chambers.

== Current tenants ==
The Department of Business, Tourism, Culture and Rural Development currently has its Provincial Historic Sites of Newfoundland and Labrador offices located in the Colonial Building. Since late-2005, there are also three other non-profit organizations operating from the Colonial Building, including the Museum Association of Newfoundland and Labrador (MANL), the Association of Newfoundland and Labrador Archives (ANLA), and The Newfoundland Historical Society.
