= Richard Squires =

6th Prime Minister of Newfoundland (1919–1923; 1928–1932)

The Right Honourable Sir Richard Squires KCMG PC KC
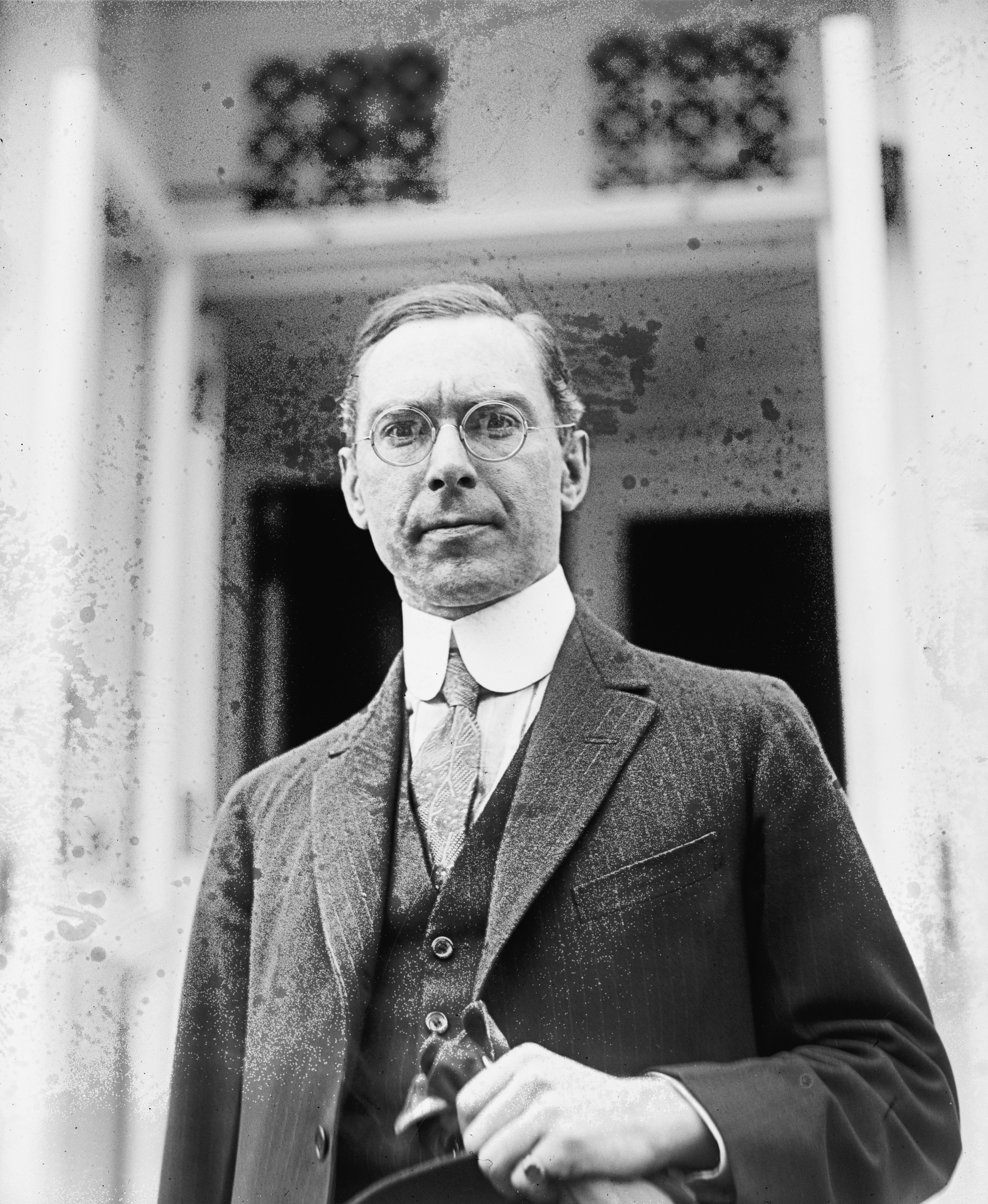
- Squires standing in front of the Colonial Building in 1921

6th Prime Minister of Newfoundland
- In office November 17, 1928 – June 11, 1932
- Monarch: George V
- Governor: John Middleton
- Preceded by: Frederick C. Alderdice
- Succeeded by: Frederick C. Alderdice
- In office November 17, 1919 – July 24, 1923
- Monarch: George V
- Governor: Charles Alexander Harris; William Allardyce
- Preceded by: Michael Patrick Cashin
- Succeeded by: William Warren
Ministerial offices
Minister of Justice and Attorney General
In office 1928–1932
Prime Minister	Himself
Preceded by	William J. Higgins
Succeeded by	Edward Emerson
In office 1914–1917
Prime Minister	Edward Morris
Preceded by	Donald Morison
Succeeded by	William Warren
Colonial Secretary
In office 1919–1923
Prime Minister	Himself
Preceded by	John R. Bennett
Succeeded by	William Halfyard
In office 1917–1918
Prime Minister	Edward Morris
Preceded by	John R. Bennett
Succeeded by	William Halfyard
Legislative offices
Member of the Newfoundland House of Assembly for Humber
In office October 29, 1928 – June 11, 1932
Preceded by	Thomas Power (as MHA for St. George's)
Succeeded by	F. Gordon Bradley
Member of the Newfoundland House of Assembly for St. John's West
In office November 3, 1919 – June 2, 1924 Serving with Henry J. Brownrigg (1919–1923); John R. Bennett (1919–1923); Charles Hunt (1923–1924); Michael Cashin (1923–1924)
Preceded by	Edward Morris; Michael Kennedy
Succeeded by	John Crosbie; William Browne; William Linegar
Member of the Legislative Council of Newfoundland
In office 1914–1919
Nominated by	Edward Morris
Appointed by	Walter Davidson
Member of the Newfoundland House of Assembly for Trinity Bay
In office May 8, 1909 – October 30, 1913 Serving with Robert Watson and Edwin Grant
Preceded by	George W. Gushue; Arthur Miller
Succeeded by	John G. Stone; Archibald Targett; William F. Lloyd

Personal details
- Born: January 18, 1880 Harbour Grace, Newfoundland Colony
- Died: March 26, 1940 (aged 60) St. John's, Newfoundland
- Party: People's (1908–1919); Liberal Reform (1919–1924); Liberal (1924–1932)
- Spouse: Helena Squires (m. 1905)
- Children: 7
- Education: Dalhousie Law School

Sir Richard Anderson Squires KCMG (January 18, 1880 – March 26, 1940) was the Prime Minister of Newfoundland from 1919 to 1923 and from 1928 to 1932.

As prime minister, Squires attempted to reform Newfoundland's fishing industry, but failed at doing so. He also attempted to diversify Newfoundland's economy. However, his two tenures as prime minister were both marred by serious corruption. He lost the position in 1923 after an arrest for bribery. In 1932, he narrowly escaped a riot, which forced him from power, and temporarily ended democracy in Newfoundland.

While Squires retired after the riot, he continued to campaign against rule by the British Crown under the Commission of Government. He died in 1940, at the age of 60.

== Early career ==
Squires was born in Harbour Grace, Newfoundland in 1880. He started out practising law in St. John's. He served as a member in the government of Edward Patrick Morris from 1913 to 1918. In 1919, Squires started a campaign for the vacant leadership of the Liberal Party. He won the leadership over William Warren.

== Prime minister ==
Squires won the election of 1919 over Sir Michael Cashin of the Newfoundland People's Party (later called the Liberal-Labour-Progressive Party). He did this by forming an alliance with the Fisherman's Protective Union of William Coaker under the name of the Liberal Reform Party.

During his first government, Squires started the development of the Humber River. He also attempted many reforms suggested by Coaker. These reforms would have regulated the fishery but failed because of a collapse in fish prices which was blamed on Coaker's reforms.

Squires's government attempted to diversify the economy and, to this end, financially assisted the failing transinsular railway operated by the Reid Newfoundland Company, finally nationalizing the railway in 1923.

== Fall from power ==
Squires's government was accused of using bribes to win the 1923 General Election. A cabinet minister, Dr. Alex A. Campbell, was in the centre of the scandal. Several other cabinet members demanded Campbell be forced to resign. When Squires refused they said they would cross the floor. The Attorney General William Warren issued an arrest warrant for Squires. Squires was arrested and later released on bond. He then resigned as prime minister.

== Opposition ==
Squires remained in the House of Assembly, as an independent member. In the next year, Newfoundland saw four governments fall. It was not until Walter Monroe won the 1924 election that stability was restored. Squires remained in the background working on a possible return to power. In 1928, Walter Monroe resigned as prime minister and was replaced by his cousin Frederick C. Alderdice. In the election of 1928, Squires returned as Liberal leader and defeated the Conservatives.

== Governing in the Depression ==
His next government started out well, seeing the election of his wife Helena Squires as the first woman to sit in the House of Assembly. However, Newfoundland was struck hard by the Great Depression; fish prices fell and an already severe public debt worsened. In 1932 Canada refused his request to join the Canadian Confederation.

Widespread unemployment caused by the Great Depression and allegations of corruption against Squires and his government along with the government's inability to deal with the economic crisis created widespread discontent and political instability.

In 1932, Squires's finance minister, Peter John Cashin, resigned from the executive council accusing his fellow cabinet ministers of widespread corruption and Squires himself of having falsified council minutes to hide the fact that he had been receiving secret payments out of public funds. Cashin's charge inflamed a public which had already been seized by discontent due to the deteriorating economic situation in the country.

On April 5, 1932, a large parade was organized by the opposition. They marched to the Colonial Building which was the seat of the House of Assembly. There were over 10,000 people at the protest and things got out of control, leading to the 1932 Colonial Building riot.

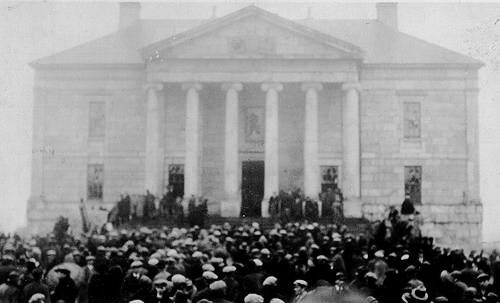
The riot at the Colonial Building in 1932

The crowd got angry when no one came out to address them. After a short while, several people managed to break into the building. Squires and government members had to escape around the back. Squires was nearly caught trying to get into a cab; he got away only by running through a house on Colonial Street (near the Colonial Building) to a waiting cab on Bannerman Street.

== Fall from power ==
Squires had little choice but to dissolve his government and call an election, the result of which was the defeat of the Liberal government and the loss of Squires's own seat. The Liberals won only two seats out of 28. Alderdice, who was still leader of the opposition, came to power and went about putting into place a Commission of Government, ending democracy in Newfoundland until 1949, when Newfoundland joined Canada.

Squires retired but always remained active in his opposition to the Commission of Government. He died at the age of 60, in 1940.

At the time of his death he was Worshipful Grand Master of the Grand Orange Lodge of British America, one of the few democratic institutions operating during the Commission of Government period.

== See also ==
- General elections in Newfoundland (pre-Confederation)

Political offices
Preceded by Sir Michael Patrick Cashin	Prime Minister of Newfoundland; 1919–1923	Succeeded by William Warren
Preceded by Sir Frederick C. Alderdice	Prime Minister of Newfoundland; 1928–1932	Succeeded by Sir Frederick C. Alderdice
