= William Woodford (politician) =

Newfoundland politician (1858–1944)

The Honourable William Woodford MHA
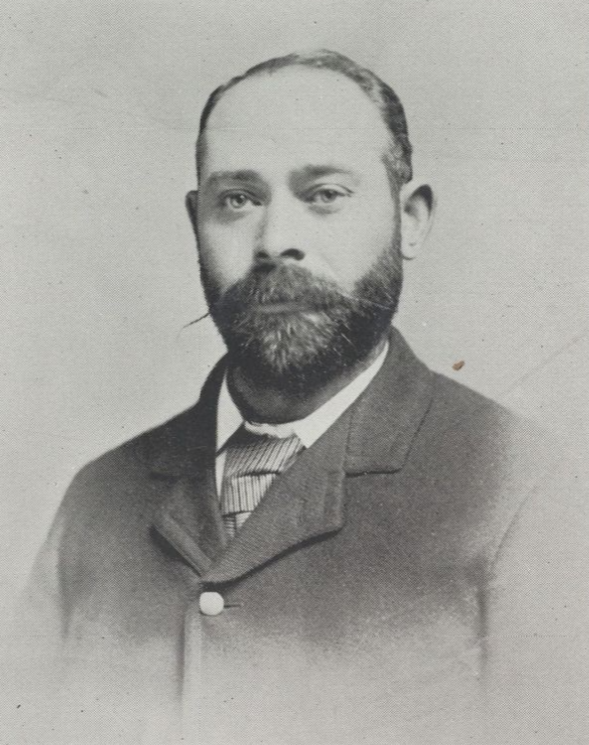
- Woodford in 1894

Member of the Newfoundland House of Assembly for Harbour Main
- In office November 2, 1908 – October 29, 1928 Serving with John J. Murphy (1908–1913); George Kennedy (1913–1919); William Jones (1919–1923); Matthew E. Hawco (1923–1924); Cyril J. Cahill (1924–1928)
- Preceded by: Francis Morris; John Lewis
- Succeeded by: Philip J. Lewis; Albert Walsh
- In office November 6, 1889 – November 8, 1900 Serving with Francis Morris (1893–1897); John St. John (1897–1900)
- Preceded by: John Veitch; Richard MacDonnell
- Succeeded by: Francis Morris

Personal details
- Born: William Joseph Woodford; 1858 St. John's, Newfoundland Colony
- Died: January 23, 1944 (aged 85–86) St. John's, Newfoundland
- Party: Liberal (1889–1897); Conservative (1897–1908); People's (1908–1919); Liberal-Progressive (1919–1923); Liberal-Labour-Progressive (1923–1924); Liberal-Conservative Progressive (1924–1928)
- Spouse: Minnie Whidden
- Education: Saint Bonaventure's College
- Occupation: Carpenter and real estate agent

William Joseph Woodford (1858 – January 23, 1944) was a politician in Newfoundland. He represented Harbour Main in the Newfoundland House of Assembly from 1889 to 1900 and from 1908 to 1928.

== Early life ==
The son of William Woodford, a sealing captain, and Sarah Cole, he was born in St. John's and was educated at Saint Bonaventure's College. Woodford married Minnie Whidden. He took up the trades of carpentry and plasterwork. Woodford also managed real estate holdings acquired by his father.

== Politics ==
Woodford was first elected as one of two members for the district of Harbour Main in 1889 as a Liberal supporter of Sir William Whiteway. was named to the Executive Council as Financial Secretary in 1894. He became a Conservative in 1897, and after he was re-elected, he was named to the Executive Council as Minister of Public Works under James S. Winter. However, in 1900, he supported a vote of no confidence which brought down the Winter government, and he did not run for re-election.

Woodford returned to the assembly in 1908 as a member of the Newfoundland People's Party. He served in the cabinet again as Minister of Public Works and later as Minister of Posts and Telegraphs. Woodford retired from politics in 1928.

== Later life ==
After he left the assembly, he served as Supervisor of Lighthouses for a year. He died in St. John's on January 23, 1944.
