= Henry J. Brownrigg =

Newfoundland politician

Henry Joseph Brownrigg (1874 – August 13, 1945) was a merchant and politician in Newfoundland. He represented St. John's West in the Newfoundland House of Assembly from 1919 to 1923 as a Liberal-Reform member.

He was born in St. John's and was educated at Saint Bonaventure's College. He operated a liquor store in St. John's beginning in the late 1890s. He was a member of St. John's municipal council from 1916 to 1919. Brownrigg was elected to the Newfoundland assembly in 1919 and served in the Newfoundland cabinet as Minister of Finance and Customs. He did not run for reelection in 1923. From 1925 to 1931, he served as Commissioner of Public Charities. In 1932, he opened an insurance agency in partnership with his son.

In 1963, Brownrigg Place in St. John's was named in his honour.
