= William H. Cave =

Newfoundland merchant and politician

The Honourable William H. Cave
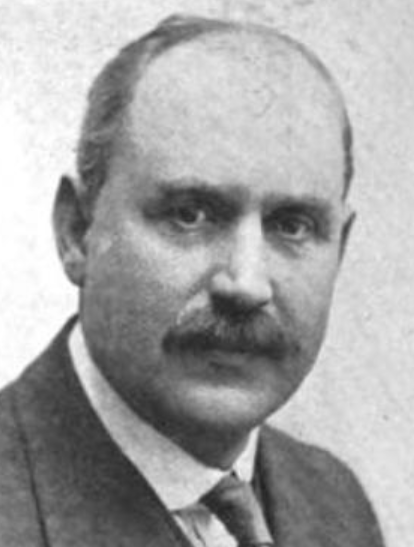

Member of the Newfoundland House of Assembly
- In office 1919–1924
- Constituency: Bay de Verde

Personal details
- Born: William Henry Cave; February 22, 1872 Bay Roberts, Newfoundland
- Died: July 7, 1941 (aged 69) St. John's, Newfoundland
- Party: Liberal
- Spouse: Emma Allan (m. 1899)
- Children: 3
- Occupation: Merchant, politician

William Henry Cave (February 22, 1872 – July 7, 1941) was a merchant and politician in Newfoundland. He represented Bay de Verde in the Newfoundland House of Assembly from 1919 to 1924.

== Biography ==
The son of Edward Cave and Fannie Russell, he was born in Bay Roberts and was educated there. After completing his schooling, he spent several years in Canada working as a member of the Salvation Army Field Force. On his return to Newfoundland, he became superintendent of Salvation Army schools. Cave reached the rank of major before he resigned in 1916 and set up a dry goods business in St. John's.

In 1899, he had married Emma Allan; the couple had three children.

In 1919, Cave finished second in the two member riding of Bay de Verde, five votes ahead of Albert Hickman, the Liberal Progressive candidate. Hickman appealed the result of the election, citing voting irregularities; Cave filed a counter-suit accusing Hickman of bribery. The Newfoundland Supreme Court found both men guilty and set aside the result of the election. In the subsequent by-election, Cave was re-elected. Cave had been named Minister of Shipping following the general election; although this was not a cabinet post, this may have helped him win the by-election. He was re-elected in 1923 and was named to the Newfoundland cabinet as Minister of Finance and Customs. Cave was defeated when he ran for re-election in 1924 and again in 1928.

He died in St. John's at the age of 69.
