= Philip F. Moore =

Newfoundland plumber and politician

Philip F. Moore (1867 – 1936) was a plumber and politician in Newfoundland. He represented Ferryland in the Newfoundland House of Assembly from 1909 to 1928.

He operated a plumbing and heating business in St. John's which mainly dealt with ship's plumbing. Moore ran unsuccessfully for a seat in the Newfoundland assembly in 1908 before being elected in 1909. He was named government plumbing inspector in 1928.

Moore was also a well-known amateur actor and singer in St. John's.
