= John Guppy (politician) =

Newfoundland politician

John Guppy (1874 – August 12, 1937) was a fisherman, farmer and political figure in the Colony of Newfoundland. He represented Trinity Bay in the Newfoundland House of Assembly from 1919 to 1923 as a member of the Fishermen's Protective Union.

He was born in Port Rexton. Guppy served as chairman of the local council for Port Rexton. He did not run for reelection in 1923. Guppy was a director of the Union Electric Light and Power Company. and later served as a director for the Union Trading Company. He died in Port Rexton in 1937.
