= Charles Edward Hunt =

Newfoundland lawyer and politician

Charles Edward Hunt (April 24, 1886 – July 27, 1954) was a lawyer and politician in Newfoundland. He represented St. John's West in the Newfoundland House of Assembly from 1923 to 1924 as a Liberal-Labour-Progressive member.

He was born in St. John's and was educated at Bishop Feild College. Hunt articled with Sir James Winter and was called to the Newfoundland bar in 1912. From 1912 to 1918, he practised law with Donald Morison; Hunt joined the law firm of Conroy and Higgins in 1918.

He was elected to the Newfoundland assembly in 1923 and did not run for reelection in 1924. Hunt became the law clerk for the assembly. He served as legal counsel for the Hollis Walker Enquiry in 1924 and was Newfoundland counsel for the Pecuniary Claims Award in Washington in 1925. Hunt served on the board of governors of the Newfoundland Broadcasting Corporation, on the board of directors for Bishop Feild College and on the board of governors for Memorial University College. He was one of the founders of the St. John's Rotary Club, later serving as club president, as district governor and as a member of the Rotary International Administration Commission.

Hunt married Signe Lindahl. His son Douglas became a judge in the Newfoundland Supreme Court.
