= Archibald Targett =

Newfoundland politician

Archibald Targett (1862 – 1931) was a tinsmith and political figure in Newfoundland. He represented Trinity Bay in the Newfoundland and Labrador House of Assembly from 1913 to 1923 as a member of the Fishermen's Protective Union.

He was born in St. John's, the son of John Targett, and was educated in Hunt's Harbour. Targett was a member of the district council for the FPU in Trinity Bay. He did not run for reelection in 1923, when he was named sergeant-at-arms for the Newfoundland assembly. Targett married Sarah Tuck.
