= 29th General Assembly of Newfoundland =

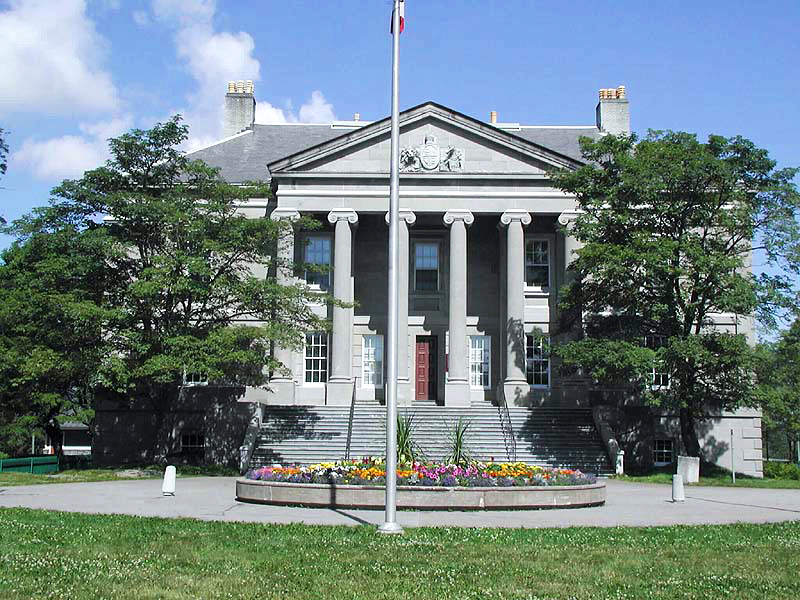
- Colonial Building seat of the Newfoundland government and the House of Assembly from January 28, 1850, to July 28, 1959.

History
- Founded: July 11, 1949
- Disbanded: November 3, 1951
- Preceded by: 28th General Assembly of Newfoundland (Commission of Government/National Convention)
- Succeeded by: 30th General Assembly of Newfoundland

Leadership
- Premier: Joey Smallwood

Elections
- Last election: 1949 Newfoundland general election

The members of the 29th General Assembly of Newfoundland were elected in the Newfoundland general election held in June 1949. The general assembly sat from July 11, 1949 to November 3, 1951. This was the first general election held in Newfoundland since the assembly was replaced by an appointed Commission of Government in 1934. Newfoundland had joined Canadian Confederation in March 1949.

The Liberal Party led by Joey Smallwood formed the government.

Reginald F. Sparkes served as speaker.

There were four sessions of the 29th General Assembly:

Session	Start	End
1st	July 11, 1949	December 7, 1949
2nd	February 15, 1950	June 30, 1950
3rd	March 7, 1951	October 17, 1951
4th	October 24, 1951	November 3, 1951

Sir Albert Walsh served as lieutenant governor of Newfoundland until September 1949. Sir Leonard Outerbridge succeeded Walsh as lieutenant governor.

== Members of the Assembly ==
The following members were elected to the assembly in 1949:

Member	Electoral district	Party	First elected
Joseph R. Smallwood	Bonavista North	Liberal	1949
Edward Russell	Bonavista South	Liberal	1949
Edward Russell	Bonavista South	Independent	1949
Herman W. Quinton	Burgeo and La Poile	Liberal	1949
Phillip S. Forsey	Burin	Liberal	1949
Herbert L. Pottle	Carbonear-Bay de Verde	Liberal	1949
Peter J. Cashin	Ferryland	Independent	1949
Gordon Janes	Fogo	Liberal	1949
John R. Courage	Fortune Bay and Hermitage	Liberal	1949
Edward S. Spencer	Grand Falls	Liberal	1949
A. Baxter Morgan	Green Bay	Liberal	1949
James R. Chalker	Harbour Grace	Liberal	1949
David I. Jackman	Harbour Main-Bell Island	Progressive Conservative	1949
Ronald J. Fahey	Harbour Main-Bell Island	Progressive Conservative	1949
Charles H. Ballam	Humber	Liberal	1949
Harold Horwood	Labrador (Note: Election held July 25, 1949)	Liberal	1949
Leonard J. Miller	Placentia and St. Mary's	Progressive Conservative	1949
Patrick J. Canning	Placentia West	Liberal	1949
George T. Makinson	Port de Grave	Liberal	1949
Reginald F. Sparkes	St. Barbe	Liberal	1949
William J. Keough	St. George's-Port au Port	Liberal	1949
John G. Higgins	St. John's East	Progressive Conservative	1949
Frank D. Fogwill	St. John's East	Progressive Conservative	1949
Oliver L. Vardy	St. John's West	Liberal	1949
James J. Spratt	St. John's West	Liberal	1949
Samuel J. Hefferton	Trinity North	Liberal	1949
C. Maxwell Button	Trinity South	Liberal	1949
Leslie R. Curtis	Twillingate	Liberal	1949
Samuel Drover	White Bay	Liberal	1949
