= 1949 Newfoundland general election =

Canadian provincial election

- May 27, 1949

28 seats of the Newfoundland House of Assembly 15 seats were needed for a majority
- Turnout: 95.6%
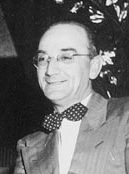

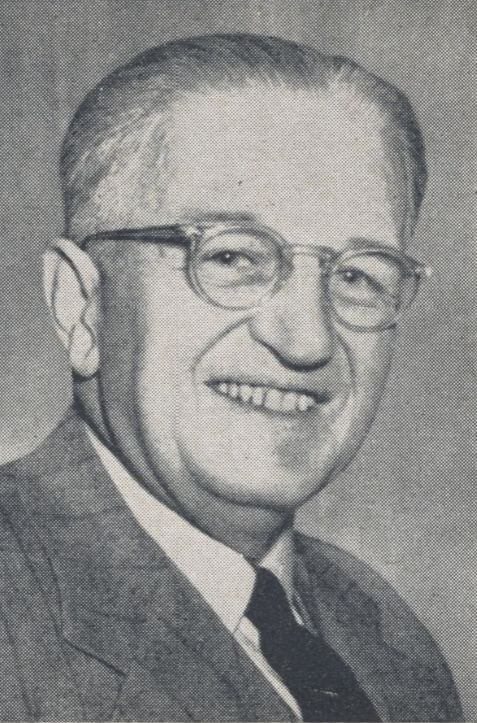
	First party	Second party
Leader	Joey Smallwood	Harry Mews
Party	Liberal	Progressive Conservative
Leader's seat	Bonavista North	Ran in St. John's West (lost)
Seats won	22	5
Popular vote	110,459	54,728
Percentage	65.58%	32.49%
Premier before election
Office established
Premier after election
Joey Smallwood
Liberal

The 1949 Newfoundland general election was held on 27 May 1949 to elect members of the 29th General Assembly of Newfoundland. It was the first general election held since Newfoundland joined Canadian Confederation on 31 March 1949 and the first Newfoundland-wide election of any kind since the suspension of responsible government and the creation of the Commission of Government in 1934. The election was won by the Liberal Party.

Joey Smallwood was invited to form an interim administration when Newfoundland became a part of Canada just before midnight on March 31, 1949. This interim Smallwood administration continued until the results of the May election.

The election was held under the House of Assembly Act of 1932, with the same 27 seats, plus a new seat for Labrador, though the election in the Labrador seat was deferred until July 25. The five seats where Progressive Conservatives won had all voted heavily against confederation in the 1948 Newfoundland referendums.

== Results ==
Party	Leader	Candidates	Seats won	Popular vote	(%)
Liberal	Joey Smallwood	28	22	110,459	65.58%
Progressive Conservative	Harry Mews	27	5	54,728	32.49%
Other		3	1	2,980	1.77%
Total valid votes				168,167	99.84%
Blank or invalid ballots				268	0.16%
Totals		58	28	168,435	100%

== Results by district ==
- Names in **boldface type** represent party leaders.

=== St. John's ===
Electoral district	Candidates		Incumbent
Electoral district	Liberal	PC	Incumbent
St. John's East	Geoffrey Carnell; 6,417; 24.51%	John G. Higgins; 6,878; 26.27%	New districts
St. John's East	James Fagan; 6,276; 23.97%	Frank Fogwill; 6,611; 25.25%	New districts
St. John's West	Oliver Vardy; 8,411; 26.55%	**Harry Mews**; 7,526; 23.76%	New districts
St. John's West	James Spratt; 8,363; 26.40%	Michael Harrington; 7,381; 23.30%	New districts

=== Conception Bay ===
Electoral district	Candidates		Incumbent
Electoral district	Liberal	PC	Incumbent
Carbonear-Bay de Verde	Herbert Pottle; 3,770; 69.85%	Clayton Puddester; 1,627; 30.15%	New districts
Harbour Grace	James Chalker; 2,066; 62.55%	Richard Parsons; 1,237; 37.45%	New districts
Harbour Main-Bell Island	Addison Bown; 2,927; 21.21%	David Jackman; 4,259; 30.86%	New districts
Harbour Main-Bell Island	Myles Murray; 2,807; 20.34%	Ronald Fahey; 3,808; 27.59%	New districts
Port de Grave	George Makinson; 2,243; 64.73%	W.R. Dawe; 1,222; 35.27%	New districts

=== Avalon and Burin Peninsulas ===
Electoral district	Candidates			Incumbent
Electoral district	Liberal	PC	Other	Incumbent
Burin	Phillip Forsey; 3,947; 90.47%	Grace Sparkes; 416; 9.53%		New districts
Ferryland	Augustus Greene; 456; 13.82%		Peter Cashin (Independent); 2,506; 75.94%	New districts
Ferryland	Augustus Greene; 456; 13.82%		John O'Brien (Independent); 338; 10.24%	New districts
Placentia-St. Mary's	Michael Sinnott; 2,022; 48.28%	Leonard Miller; 2,166; 51.72%		New districts
Placentia West	Patrick Canning; 3,100; 78.28%	Leo Murphy; 860; 21.72%		New districts
Trinity South	Maxwell Button; 3,070; 72.71%	Isaac Mercer; 1,152; 27.29%		New districts

=== Eastern and Central Newfoundland ===
Electoral district	Candidates		Incumbent
Electoral district	Liberal	PC	Incumbent
Bonavista North	**Joey Smallwood**; 4,215; 86.87%	James Way; 637; 13.13%	New districts
Bonavista South	Ted Russell; 3,643; 68.63%	Walter Young; 1,583; 31.37%	New districts
Fogo	Gordon Janes; 3,121; 83.83%	Harold Earle; 602; 16.17%	New districts
Grand Falls	Edward Spencer; 7,014; 81.56%	Lewis Cooper; 1,586; 18.44%	New districts
Green Bay	Baxter Morgan; 2,901; 87.12%	Roy Manuel; 429; 12.88%	New districts
Trinity North	Samuel Hefferton; 3,727; 78.40%	James Mifflin; 1,027; 21.60%	New districts
Twillingate	Leslie Curtis; 3,100; 91.36%	Cyril Parkins; 293; 8.64%	New districts

=== Southern and Western Newfoundland ===
Electoral district	Candidates			Incumbent
Electoral district	Liberal	PC	Other	Incumbent
Burgeo-La Poile	Herman Quinton; 3,225; 92.65%	Edgar Skinner; 256; 7.35%		New districts
Fortune and Hermitage	John R. Courage; 4,032; 92.54%	Douglas Pinsent; 325; 7.46%		New districts
Humber	Charles Ballam; 7,174; 83.25%	Pierce Fudge; 1,307; 15.17%	Louis Bonnell (Independent); 136; 1.58%	New districts
St. Barbe	Reginald Sparkes; 2,588; 93.16%	George Whiteley; 190; 6.84%		New districts
St. George's-Port au Port	William Keough; 4,076; 81.50%	John Dawson; 925; 18.50%		New districts
White Bay	Sam Drover; 4,023; 90.61%	Frederick Wells; 417; 9.39%		New districts

=== Labrador ===
Electoral district	Candidates		Incumbent
Electoral district	Liberal	PC	Incumbent
Labrador (Note: Due to logistical difficulties, the election in Labrador was delayed until July 25, 1949.)	Harold Horwood; 1,268; 90.51%	Samuel D. Grant; 133; 9.49%	New district
