= P. W. Crummey =

Pleaman Wellington Crummey
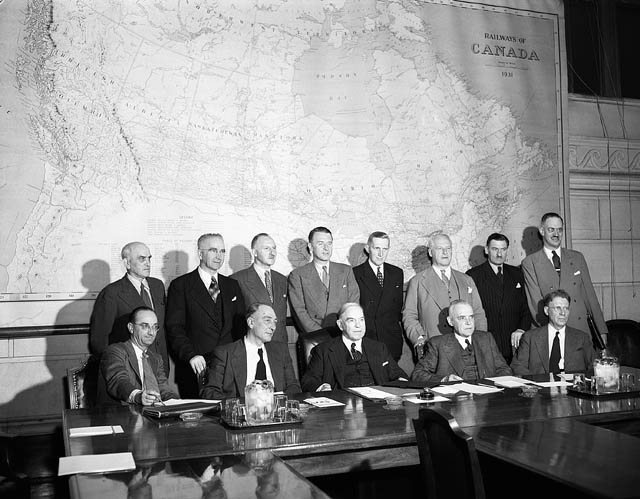
- The delegation which negotiated the entry of Newfoundland into Confederation (Rear, l.-r. P.W. Crummey)

Personal details
- Born: 1891 Western Bay
- Died: 1960 (aged 68–69) Western Bay
- Spouse: Florence Belle Kennedy
- Children: Jay Crummey, Safford Crummey
- Occupation: merchant seaman, school teacher, magistrate

Pleaman Wellington Crummey JP (1891–1960) was a public figure in the Dominion of Newfoundland and the Province of Newfoundland (now Newfoundland and Labrador). He was born at Western Bay, Conception Bay.

== Family ==
P. W. Crummey's father was Captain Eli Crummey of Western Bay. His mother was Emma Butt of Broad Cove. On July 14, 1926, he married his childhood sweetheart Florence Belle Kennedy.

Crummey's family was long-involved in the Atlantic cod fishery. His grandfather James Cromey was the owner/operator of a merchant station located on South Wolf Island near Indian Tickle Groswater Bay.

== Education ==
P. W. Crummey received a high school certificate from The Methodist College (predecessor of Prince of Wales Collegiate) in St. John's and received an associate of arts diploma from the State University of New York, in Oswego, U.S.A.

== Employment ==
In 1919, P. W. Crummey joined the Ministry of Marine and Shipping. He spent the summers plying the Labrador coast as a purser aboard S.S. Senif. In 1922, he became a school teacher. Crummey taught at various communities including Shoal Harbour, and eventually became Superintendent of the Methodist School Board.

== Judiciary ==
P. W. Crummey was a Commissioner of the Supreme Court and a Justice of the Peace.

== Social organizations ==
P. W. Crummey served as an Officer of the United Church of Canada. He was a Freemason and an Orangeman; he attended Orangeman conferences across Newfoundland and also in Canada. He was Master of The Lord Admiral Nelson (Orange) Lodge in Western Bay, and in 1937 was elected Grand-Master of the Newfoundland Orange Lodge.

== Methodist Guards ==
P. W. Crummey was Captain of Western Bay's detachment of the Epworth Guards, which was a volunteer cadet corps that later changed its name to the Methodist Guards.

== Aircraft Detection Corps (Newfoundland) ==
P. W. Crummey volunteered with the Aircraft Detection Corps Newfoundland, which was created by the Commission of Government during World War II. The Aircraft Detection Corps was an all-volunteer civilian unit meant to observe the Newfoundland coast for suspicious planes and ships. In March 1942, he received a letter from Newfoundland's Commissioner of Defence L. E. Emerson informing him that Aircraft Detection Corps Newfoundland would be administered by the Royal Canadian Air Force as a unit of the Canadian Aircraft Identity Corps. Crummey also received: a letter from Flight Lieutenant H. H. Graham, Officer Commanding No. 1 Group RCAF St. John's; glossaries of airplanes and ships; an identity card; instructions; and a brass pin for his lapel.

== Newfoundland National Convention ==
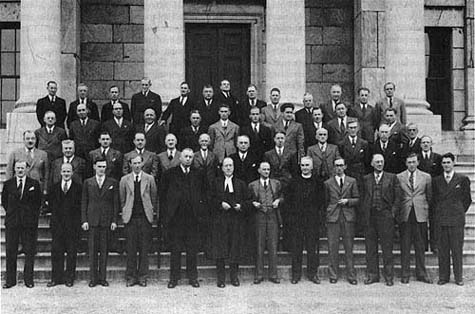
Newfoundland National Convention

On June 21, 1946, P. W. Crummey was acclaimed to represent Bay-de-Verde at the Newfoundland National Convention.

Its inaugural assembly was convened in the Colonial Building on September 11, 1946.

== Ottawa Delegation ==
Crummey was a member of the Ottawa Delegation, which was sent by the National Convention to Ottawa to negotiate the Terms of Union between Newfoundland and Canada.

The members (With their districts) were: * T. G. W. Ashbourne (Twillingate) * F. G. Bradley (Bonavista South) * Charles Ballam (Humber) * Lester Burry (Labrador) * P. W. Crummey (Bay de Verde) * Joey Smallwood (Bonavista Centre)

== Negotiations ==
P. W. Crummey was assigned to the Fisheries Portfolio. He reported to the National Convention that the British North America Act states all maritime matters are a federal jurisdiction so Newfoundland would lose control of its offshore resources if it joined Canada. As a Member of the Ottawa Delegation, P. W. Crummey was the last Newfoundland citizen to represent its Fisheries Portfolio. Today, there is a provincial fisheries minister but the department has no authority over maritime affairs, only the processing and marketing of fish after it has been landed.

== Responsible Government League ==
P. W. Crummey was a member of the Responsible Government League, which was formed in February 1947 by Major Peter Cashin to oppose Canadian Confederation. Seeking alternative options for Newfoundland's future, Crummey and several other delegates split away to form the Party for Economic Union with the United States.

== Economic Union Party ==
The Economic Union Party was created on March 20, 1948, by St. John's businessman Chesley Crosbie and "co-founded" by Geoff Stirling, publisher of The Sunday Herald. 627981180 9552321 There was insufficient support in the Convention to have the option of economic union with the US placed on the 1948 referendum ballot, Crummey and other EUP members called for a vote for responsible government in opposition to Joey Smallwood and his Confederate Association. With the results of the first referendum being inconclusive, a second round of balloting was held and Newfoundland joined Canadian Confederation.

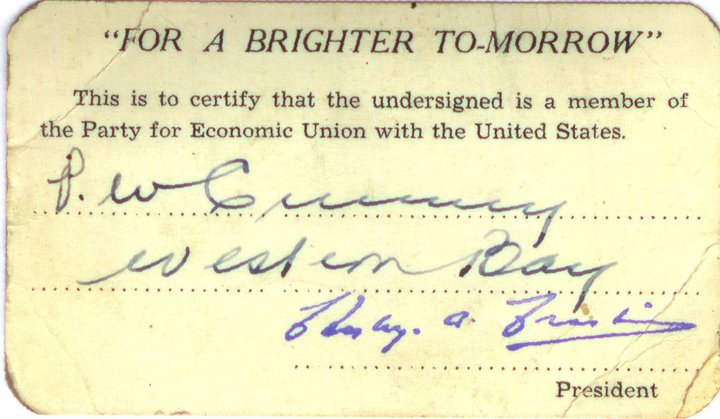
PW Crummey's Economic Union Party Membership Card.

== Post-Confederation politics ==
P. W. Crummey was defeated as the Progressive Conservative candidate for Carbonear/Bay de Verde in the provincial elections of 1951 and 1956.
