= History of Canada (1945–1960) =

Prosperity returned to Canada during the Second World War. With continued Liberal governments, national policies increasingly turned to social welfare, including universal health care, old-age pensions, and veterans' pensions.

The financial crisis of the Great Depression after WW1, scoured by rampant corruption, had led Newfoundlanders to relinquish responsible government in 1934 and become a crown colony ruled by a British governor. Prosperity returned when the U.S. military arrived in 1941 with over 10,000 soldiers and huge investments in air and naval bases. Popular sentiment grew favourable toward the United States, alarming the Canadian government, which now wanted Newfoundland to enter into confederation instead of joining with the U.S. In 1948, the British government gave voters three Referendum choices: remaining a crown colony, returning to Dominion status (that is, independence), or joining Canada. Joining the U.S. was not made an option. After bitter debate Newfoundlanders voted to join Canada in 1949 as a province.

== Postwar adjustment ==
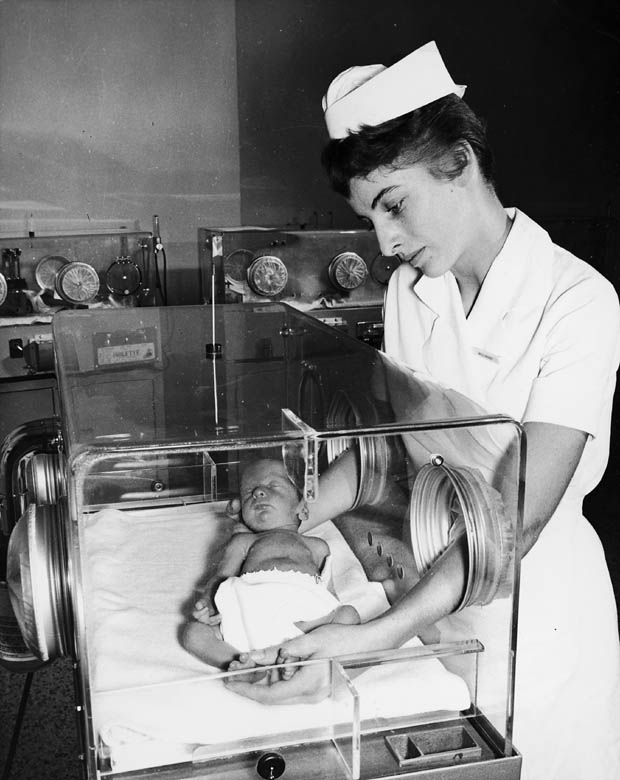
A newborn baby in an incubator at Toronto Western Hospital, 1955

The Second World War brought many changes to Canada; Canada had an economic boom, the government was necessarily more centralized during the war, and it remained so afterwards. The federal government also began to adopt social welfare policies, often borrowed from the Co-operative Commonwealth Federation, which had introduced such policies in the western provinces even before the war. Federally, these included hospital insurance, old-age pensions, and veterans' pensions. Once the war ended, divisions in the Armed Forces were disbanded, and women would not be recruited again until the Korean War in 1951. Free child-care and tax concessions were rescinded to encourage women to leave the workforce, and an act providing a family allowance or "baby bonus" was passed to help families recover from the cost of war and the wartime wage freeze. Parents of children under 16 years old were given monthly payments between $5 and $8, depending on the age of the children. The economy had prospered because of the war, and in Alberta, there was an economic boom due to the discovery of new oil fields in 1947. Spending on consumer goods increased during the post-war period while car ownership steadily rose, with two-thirds of households owning a car (and 10% owning two or more) by 1960.

In 1947, a new Canadian citizenship separate from being a British subject was introduced. After January 1, 1947, all persons born in Canada automatically were granted Canadian citizenship at birth. Persons with the previous Canadian citizenship (being a class of British subject) were also granted the new citizenship under most conditions. "Status Indians" (see the Indian Act) born before this date were retroactively given Canadian citizenship in 1956. They had not been "enfranchised" citizens before 1947.

Mackenzie King won the election of 1945, but retired in 1948 and was succeeded by Louis St. Laurent. St. Laurent succeeded in extending the welfare state, and helped bring Newfoundland into Confederation as Canada's tenth province in 1949.

== Newfoundland joins the country ==
Following the Second World War, in 1946, an election was held for the Newfoundland National Convention to decide the future of the independent Dominion of Newfoundland. The Convention voted to hold a referendum to decide between continuing the direct rule of the Commission of Government or restoring responsible government. Joseph R. Smallwood, the leader of the confederates, moved that a third option of confederation with Canada should be included. Although his motion was defeated by the convention, Smallwood did not give up, but instead gathered more than 5000 petitions from the people within a fortnight which he sent to London through the Governor. The United Kingdom, insisting that it would not give Newfoundland any further financial assistance, added a third option of having Newfoundland join Canada to the ballot.

Newfoundland and Labrador.

After much debate, an initial referendum was held on June 3, 1948, to decide between continuing with the Commission of Government, reverting to dominion status, or joining Canadian Confederation. The referendum was fought by three parties, Smallwood's Confederate Association campaigned for the Confederation option while the anti-Confederation campaign was split amongst Peter Cashin's Responsible Government League and Chesley Crosbie's Party for Economic Union with the United States, both of which called for a vote for responsible government. No party advocated continuing the Commission of Government.

The result was inconclusive, with 44.6% supporting the restoration of dominion status, 41.1% for confederation with Canada, and 14.3% for continuing the Commission of Government. Between the first and second referendums, rumours had it that Catholic bishops were using their religious influence to alter the outcome of the votes. The Orange Order was incensed and called on all its members to vote for confederation, as the Catholics voted for responsible government. The Protestants of Newfoundland outnumbered the Catholics at a ratio of 2:1. This was believed to have greatly influenced the outcome of the second referendum. A second referendum on July 22, 1948, which asked Newfoundlanders to choose between confederation and dominion status, was decided by a vote of 52% to 48% for confederation with Canada. Newfoundland joined Canada on March 31, 1949.

Not everyone was satisfied with the results, however. Peter Cashin, an outspoken anti-Confederate, questioned the validity of the votes. He claimed that it was the unholy union between London and Ottawa that brought about confederation.

== Cold War ==
Gouzenko wearing his white hood for anonymity

Meanwhile, Canadian foreign relations were beginning to focus on the United States, which had eclipsed Britain as a world power. During World War II, Canada was a minor partner in the alliance between the United States and Britain, and the US had pledged to help defend Canada if necessary. Canada was one of the founding members of the United Nations in 1945, and also of the North Atlantic Treaty Organization (NATO) in 1949, but was largely overshadowed in world affairs by the United States. Canada remained a close ally of the United States throughout the Cold War.

When Igor Gouzenko, a cipher clerk for the Soviet Embassy to Canada in Ottawa, defected in 1945, fears of Soviet espionage led to a red scare and the arrest and conviction of 18 people, including Labor-Progressive Party (Communist) Member of Parliament Fred Rose.

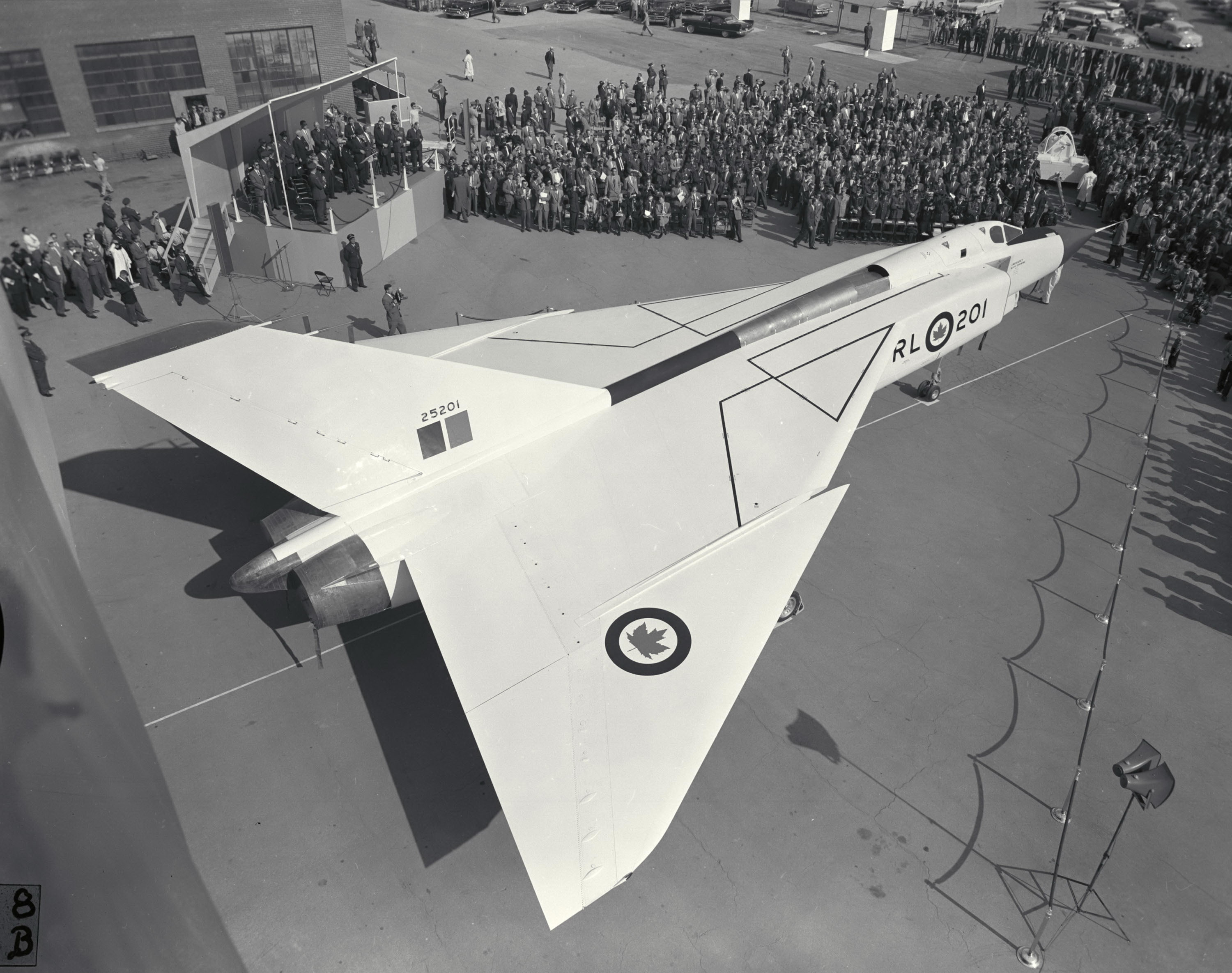
The controversial Avro Arrow.

Canada participated, under the United Nations, in the Korean War. Minister of External Affairs in St. Laurent's Cabinet, Lester Bowles Pearson, was involved in the diplomatic side of the conflict and became more active in diplomacy with the United Nations after the war ended. In 1956 Pearson suggested a solution to the Suez Crisis - the creation of an international peacekeeping force. For his efforts, Pearson won the Nobel Peace Prize in 1957.

St. Laurent attempted to create a new, highly advanced jet fighter, the Avro Arrow. He succeeded in making the fastest aircraft in history up to this point, and still to this day remains close to the level of modern aircraft. However, this controversial aircraft was cancelled by St. Laurent's successor, John George Diefenbaker, in 1959, although Diefenbaker did help establish a missile defence system with the United States, NORAD.

There were voices on both left and right that warned against being too close to the United States. Few Canadians listened before 1957. Instead, there was wide consensus on foreign and defence policies 1948 to 1957. Bothwell, Drummond and English state:

That support was remarkably uniform geographically and racially, both coast to coast and among French and English. From the CCF on the left to the Social Credit on the right, the political parties agreed that NATO was a good thing, and communism a bad thing, that a close association with Europe was desirable, and that the Commonwealth embodied a glorious past.

However, the consensus did not last. By 1957 the Suez crisis alienated Canada from both Britain and France; politicians distrusted American leadership, businessmen questioned American financial investments; and intellectuals ridiculed the values of American television and Hollywood offerings that all Canadians watched. "Public support for Canada's foreign policy big came unstuck. Foreign-policy, from being a winning issue for the Liberals, was fast becoming a losing one."

== High Arctic relocation ==
Efforts to assert sovereignty in the High Arctic during the Cold War, i.e. the area's strategic geopolitical position, were part of the reasons that led the federal government to forcibly relocate Inuit from northern Quebec to barren Cornwallis Island, Nunavut. The first group of people were relocated in 1953 from Inukjuak, Quebec (then known as Port Harrison ) and from Pond Inlet, Nunavut. They were promised homes and game to hunt, but the relocated people discovered no buildings and very little familiar wildlife. They also had to endure weeks of 24-hour darkness during the winter, and 24-hour sunlight during the summer, something that does not occur in northern Quebec. They were told that they would be returned home after a year if they wished, but this offer was later withdrawn as it would damage Canada's claims to sovereignty in the area and the Inuit were forced to stay. Eventually, the Inuit learned the local beluga whale migration routes and were able to survive in the area, hunting over a range of 18,000 square kilometres (6,900 sq mi) each year.

== See also ==
- Heritage Minutes
- History of Canada
