= Frederick Gordon Bradley =

Canadian politician

The Honourable Frederick Gordon Bradley PC QC
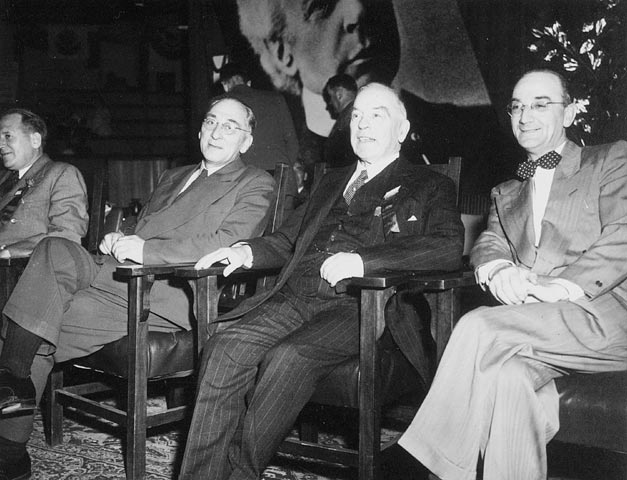
- Bradley during the 1948 Liberal convention

Senator from Bonavista—Twillingate, Newfoundland
- In office August 10, 1953 – March 30, 1966
- Nominated by: Louis St. Laurent
- Appointed by: Vincent Massey

Member of the Canadian Parliament for Bonavista—Twillingate
- In office June 27, 1949 – August 10, 1953
- Preceded by: Riding established
- Succeeded by: Jack Pickersgill

Chairman of the Newfoundland National Convention
- In office November 23, 1946 – October 11, 1947
- Preceded by: Cyril J. Fox
- Succeeded by: John McEvoy

Member of the Newfoundland National Convention for Bonavista East
- In office September 11, 1946 – January 30, 1948

Member of the Newfoundland House of Assembly for Humber
- In office June 11, 1932 – February 6, 1934
- Preceded by: Richard Squires
- Succeeded by: Charles Ballam (post-Confederation)

Member of the Newfoundland House of Assembly for Trinity Centre
- In office October 29, 1928 – June 2, 1932
- Preceded by: Isaac Randell
- Succeeded by: District abolished

Member of the Newfoundland House of Assembly for Port de Grave
- In office June 2, 1924 – October 29, 1928
- Preceded by: Harry A. Winter
- Succeeded by: Robert Smith

Personal details
- Born: March 21, 1886 St. John's, Newfoundland Colony
- Died: March 30, 1966 (aged 80) Bonavista, Newfoundland, Canada
- Party: Liberal
- Spouse: Ethel Roper (m. 1923)
- Children: 2
- Education: Dalhousie University
- Occupation: Lawyer

Frederick Gordon Bradley PC QC (March 21, 1886 – March 30, 1966) was a Newfoundlander and Canadian politician.

== Parentage ==
Born in St. John's, Newfoundland Colony, he was the son of Norman Bradley and Evangeline Trimm.

== Education and employment ==
Bradley became the principal of the Methodist School in Bonavista after finishing his education at Methodist College in 1906. Three years later, he studied law at Dalhousie University and was called to the bar in 1915. Later he started his own law practice.

== Politics ==
In 1924, he was elected to the House of Assembly representing the electoral district of Port de Grave. A Conservative, he was a Minister without Portfolio in the cabinet of Walter Stanley Monroe until he resigned from the caucus in 1926 to sit as an Independent. He was re-elected in 1928 representing the electoral district of Trinity Centre as a Liberal and served as Minister without Portfolio and Solicitor-General in the cabinet of Richard Squires. Re-elected in 1932, as only one of two Liberals, he was the leader of the opposition. An opponent of the creation of the Commission of Government, he returned to his law practice in 1933.

== Newfoundland National Convention ==
In 1947, Bradley was elected to sit in the Newfoundland National Convention. After the death of Cyril J. Fox he became the chairman.

== The London and Ottawa Delegations ==
The Newfoundland National Convention dispatched two delegations, one to the United Kingdom (the "London Delegation") and one to Canada (the "Ottawa Delegation").

== London Delegation ==
The London Delegation was unsuccessful in its attempt to get the promise of continued financial aid if Newfoundland were to resume Responsible Government.

== Ottawa Delegation ==
The Ottawa Delegation negotiated terms of union for Confederation between Newfoundland and Canada in 1947. Its members (with their districts) were:

- T. G. W. Ashbourne (Twillingate)
- F. G. Bradley (Bonavista South)
- Charles Ballam (Humber)
- Lester Burry (Labrador)
- P. W. Crummey (Bay de Verde)
- Joey Smallwood (Bonavista Centre)

The negotiations were largely a one way affair. Any union with Canada was dictated by the British North America Act (BNA), under which Canada had come into being in 1867.

== Post-Confederation ==
After Confederation with Canada, he was appointed Secretary of State for Canada by Liberal Prime Minister Louis St. Laurent, making him the first Canadian federal cabinet minister from Newfoundland. He was elected to the House of Commons of Canada representing the riding of Bonavista—Twillingate in the 1949 federal election. In 1953, he was appointed to the Senate of Canada representing the senatorial division of Bonavista-Twillingate, Newfoundland and Labrador. He died in office in 1966.
