= List of political parties in Newfoundland and Labrador =

== Parties represented in the House of Assembly ==
Name	Founded	Ideology	Membership	Leader	MHAs
Progressive Conservative Party	1949	Conservatism	>10,000 (2023)	Tony Wakeham	20 / 40
Liberal Party	1948	Liberalism	13,844 (2025)	John Hogan	15 / 40
New Democratic Party	1961	Social democracy	2,600 (2018)	Jim Dinn	2 / 40

== Historical parties in the province of Newfoundland (since 1949) ==
- Labrador Party (1969–1975, 2003–2007)
- Newfoundland and Labrador Alliance (2019–2023)
- Newfoundland and Labrador First Party (1999–2011)
- Newfoundland Reform Liberal Party (1975)
- United Newfoundland Party (1932, 1959)
- Newfoundland Democratic Party (1959)

== Historical parties during the Newfoundland National Convention (1947–1949) ==
- Responsible Government League (1947–1949)
- Confederate Association (1948–1949)
- Party for Economic Union with the United States (1948)

== Historical parties in the Dominion of Newfoundland (1854–1936) ==
- Confederation Party (1860s)
- Anti-Confederation Party (1860s)
- Conservative Party of Newfoundland (various) (1854–1934)
- Fisherman's Protective Union (1913–1934)
- Liberal Party of Newfoundland (various) (1854–1934)
- Liberal-Conservative-Progressive Party (1924–1932)
- Newfoundland People's Party (1907–1923)
- Tory Party (1890s)
- United Newfoundland Party (1932–1934)

== See also ==
- Elections Newfoundland & Labrador
- List of Newfoundland and Labrador general elections
- General elections in Newfoundland (pre-Confederation)
