= William Keough =

William Keough may refer to:

- William Keough (politician) (1913–1971), politician in Newfoundland, Canada
- William F. Keough Jr., American hostage in the Iran hostage crisis
- Ty Keough (born 1956), American soccer player and coach, sports broadcaster
