= Robert Brown Job =

Newfoundland politician (1873–1961)

The Honourable Robert Brown Job Knt. MLC
- Job in 1927

Member of the Newfoundland National Convention for St. John's City East
- In office September 11, 1946 – January 30, 1948 Serving with Edgar Hickman and Gordon Higgins

Member of the Legislative Council of Newfoundland
- In office May 10, 1927 – February 16, 1934
- Nominated by: Walter Monroe
- Appointed by: William Allardyce

Personal details
- Born: February 12, 1873 Waterloo, Merseyside, England
- Died: September 6, 1961 (aged 88) St. John's, Newfoundland, Canada
- Party: Economic Union Party
- Spouse(s): Alice Mary Warren (m. 1902–1930) Emilie Jackson (m. 1932–1934)
- Relations: William Carson Job (brother); William Warren (brother-in-law); William Carson (great-grandfather)
- Children: 1 daughter (Jennifer)
- Education: Merchant Taylors' School, Crosby, England
- Profession: Businessman

Robert Brown Job Knt. (February, 12 1873 – September 6, 1961) was an English-born businessman, politician, and economic unionist in Newfoundland. He was the oldest elected member of the Newfoundland National Convention.

== Early life and education ==
Job was born in Waterloo, England in 1873, the youngest son of Agnes (Brown) and Thomas Raffles Job (1837–1917). T.R. Job was the son of Thomas Bulley Job and Jessie Carson, the daughter of Sir William Carson. Job's mother was Agnes Beater Brown.

Job had several siblings, including three older brothers, William Carson Job (1864–1943), Samuel Ernest Job (1865–1937), and Thomas Bulley Job (born 1872). His three sisters were, Fannie Isabel, Martha, and Mildred.

Job received his education at the Merchant Taylors' School, Crosby. Afterwards, Job went to work in Liverpool for the Union Marine Insurance Company. Illness forced him to leave England in 1896, so he decided to travel to Newfoundland, his parents' homeland.

== Career ==
Job went to work in St. John's at the family's maritime mercantile business. He settled permanently in Newfoundland in 1897 and two years later, he became a full partner in the family's St. John's business, Job Brothers & Co. and that in Liverpool, Job Brothers. In 1909, Job, his brother William Carson Job, Thomas Raffles Job, and Samuel Ernest Job incorporated Job Brothers & Co., Limited. Job's early years with the company were spent assisting his older brother, W.C. Job, with the responsibilities of management. Upon W.C. Job's retirement in 1916, Job became managing director, and three years later its president, serving in that capacity for over 30 years, before retiring from management and becoming chairman of the board.

Job also had a political career. Walter Stanley Monroe appointed Job in 1927 as a member of the Legislative Council of Newfoundland and he served there until the council's 1934 dissolution. In 1945, he became the oldest elected member of the Newfoundland National Convention.

In gratitude for his 18 years of services as Belgian consul in Newfoundland, Job was made a Chevalier of the Order of the Crown of Belgium.

== Personal life ==
In 1902, Job married Alice Mary Warren (died 1930), a sister of William Robertson Warren who served as the Dominion of Newfoundland's Prime Minister from July 1923 to April 1924. Two years after Alice's death, he married secondly Emilie Jackson Warren (died 1934), William Warren's widow, and they had one daughter, Jennifer. He died at the St. Patrick's Mercy Home in St. John's in 1961.

== Selected works ==
- (1947), The Idea of a Partly Internationalized Newfoundland
- (1954). John Job's family: A story of his ancestors and successors and their business connections with Newfoundland and Liverpool 1730-1953. St. John's, Nfld: Telegram Print. Co.
