= James Spratt (Canadian politician) =

Canadian building contractor and politician (1877–1960)

The Honourable James Spratt MHA
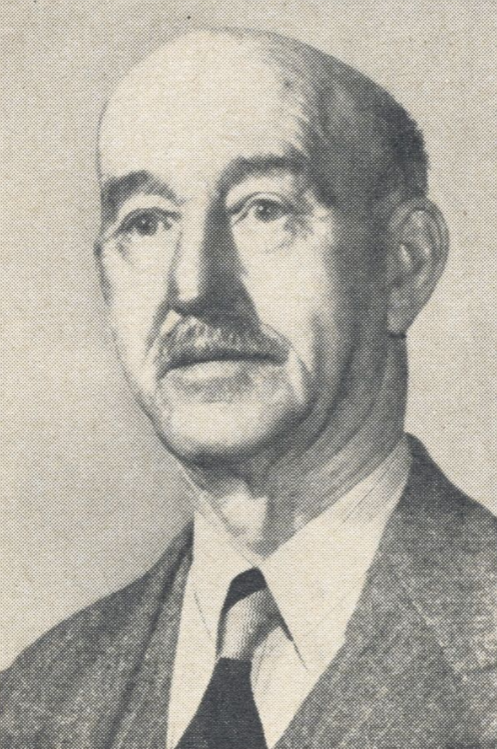
- Spratt in 1952

Minister of Provincial Affairs
- In office July 29, 1949 – December 15, 1951
- Premier: Joey Smallwood
- Preceded by: Portfolio established
- Succeeded by: Myles Murray

Member of the Newfoundland House of Assembly for St. John's West
- In office May 27, 1949 – November 7, 1951 Serving with Oliver Vardy
- Preceded by: Frederick C. Alderdice (pre-Confederation); Patrick F. Halley (pre-Confederation)
- Succeeded by: Peter Cashin

7th Deputy Mayor of St. John's, Newfoundland
- In office November 13, 1945 – May 27, 1949
- Preceded by: Eric Cook
- Succeeded by: George Nightingale

St. John's City Councillor
- In office December 1933 – May 27, 1949

Personal details
- Born: July 15, 1877 St. John's, Newfoundland Colony
- Died: April 13, 1960 (aged 82) St. John's, Newfoundland, Canada
- Party: Liberal
- Spouse: Ann Trelegan (m. 1904)
- Children: 7, including Herbert
- Occupation: Building contractor

James J. Spratt (July 15, 1877 – April 13, 1960) was a building contractor and politician in Newfoundland. He represented St. John's West in the Newfoundland House of Assembly from 1949 to 1951.

== Early life and construction career ==
The son of Thomas Spratt and Mary Kavanagh, he was born in St. John's and was educated at St. Patrick's Hall. He first was employed as a bookkeeper and later worked in construction, first in roofing and masonry and later as a builder and contractor. He served as secretary of the Bricklayers and Masons Union for 35 years. In 1904, Spratt married Annie Trelagan; the couple had seven children. He was a member of the Total Abstinence and Benefit Society.

== Politics and family ==
Spartt served sixteen years on St. John's municipal council, including four years as deputy mayor. He was elected to the Newfoundland assembly in 1949 and served in the provincial cabinet as Minister of Provincial Affairs. Spratt retired from politics in 1951.

His son Herbert was convicted of murdering his fiancée in 1942 and became the last person executed in Newfoundland.
