= Safe Harbour, Newfoundland and Labrador =

Coordinates: 49°06′15″N 53°37′07″W

Safe Harbour is an abandoned outport on the northeast coast of Newfoundland in the Canadian province of Newfoundland and Labrador. Settled by 1870, it was abandoned in 1955.

== History ==
Safe Harbour was situated on the northern shore of Bonavista Bay, between Greenspond and the Valleyfield, Badger’s Quay, Pool's Island area. It lies about two miles south of Valleyfield and one mile west of Pools Island. Originally Safe Harbour was known as Puddingbag Cove and still is identified by that name on many marine charts and topographical maps.

The first inhabitants arrived in 1860 from the neighbouring settlements of Pools Island, Greenspond, Badgers Quay and Wesleyville. As the name suggests, Safe Harbour was a desirable place to live and pursue the fishery. The land at Safe Harbour was also well suited for growing vegetables and hay.

In 1904, a whaling station was built in Safe Harbour to take advantage of the then very profitable whale fishery. This provided much needed employment to many residents for a few years. However, this endeavour was short lived because the relentless hunting soon decimated the whale population, and in 1907, the whale factory was dismantled.

During the late 1930s and early 1940s, many Safe Harbour families moved to Corner Brook where the men obtained permanent full-time jobs at the paper mill. This was the beginning of the outward migration from Safe Harbour. During the late 1940s, more families went away to St. John’s and the mainland to find work. In the 1950s, those remaining families began to move to the nearby communities of Badger’s Quay and Valleyfield, floating their houses across the water or dragging them on the winter ice. The last family moved out in 1957.

The population began to decline after the collapse of the Labrador fishery in the 1940s. Safe Harbour was one of the first communities to be abandoned under the Government's Resettlement Program.

== Settlement ==
Those who settled in Safe Harbour, around 1860, were mainly from Greenspond and Pool's Island. It is believed that the first settlers were the Sturge family; other families that came to Safe Harbour include: Attwood, Blackwood, Burry, Davis, Dyke, Janes, Gillingham, King, Knee, Stratton, and Wakeley. Safe Harbour first appears in the Census of 1874 with a population of 98.

== Church history ==
In 1874, the 98 people who lived in Safe Harbour were of the Church of England. In 1894 there was a Church of England church and school built nearby to accommodate surrounding communities. By 1891, the Methodists were building a church and school as well, and there were about 90 Methodists at Safe Harbour. The population in 1901 was 313, with 207 of those people being Methodist.

== Census information ==
	1874
population	98
inhabited houses	14
families	17
Church of England	98
can read/write	25
people catching/curing fish	50
seamen/fishermen	17
total boats	4
nets/seines	40
vessels in seal fishery	2
men on board	8
tonnage	40
cod fish cured (qtls)	920
fishing rooms in use	5
stores/barns/outhouses	5
oil produced (gals)	520
barrels of potatoes produced	166
swine/goats	29

== Interesting facts ==
- Lester Leeland Burry, who was a Labrador Parson for 26 years, was born and raised in Safe Harbour.
- Three men from Safe Harbour died in the 1898 Greenland Disaster under Captain George Barbour: Edwin Davis, John Pinsent, and John Thomas.

== See also ==
- List of ghost towns in Newfoundland and Labrador
