= Makinson Inlet =

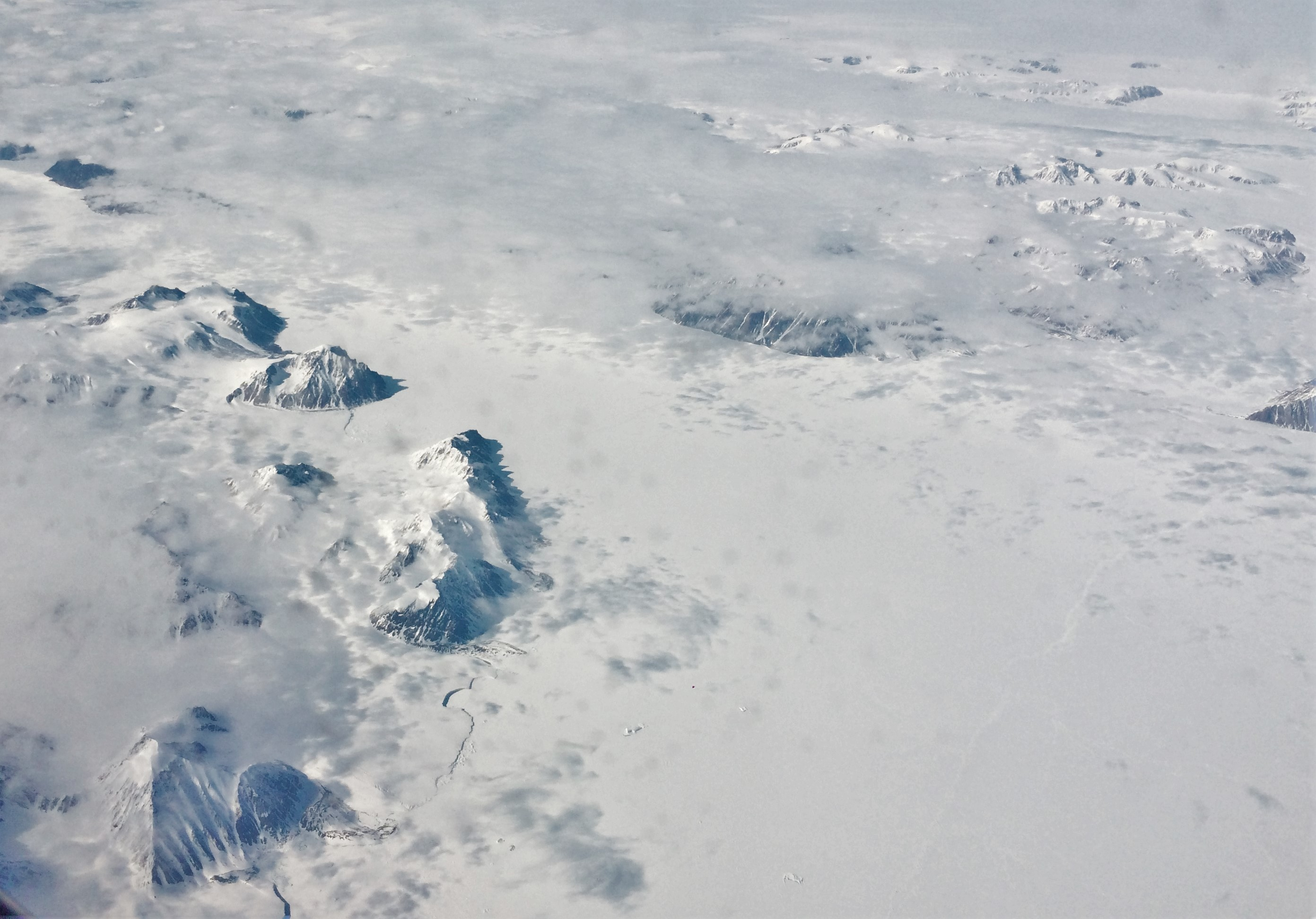
View of the mouth of Makinson Inlet with Cape Stokes in the foreground.

The Makinson Inlet (77°16′N 79°39′W) is an inlet in Qikiqtaaluk Region, Nunavut, Canada. It is located in the southeastern shore of Ellesmere Island and opens eastwards to Baffin Bay between Boger Point to the north and Cape Stokes to the south. To the west is Bowman Island and Piliravijuk Bay, and to the south-west Bentham Fiord.

The inlet takes its name from Newfoundland farmer, police officer and politician George Makinson (1903 – 1986) who explored it while he was stationed on Ellesmere Island from 1927 to 1928.
