= Patrick F. Halley =

Newfoundland politician

Member of the Newfoundland House of Assembly for St. John's West
- In office June 11, 1932 – February 16, 1934 Serving with Frederick C. Alderdice
- Preceded by: Alexander Campbell; Joseph Fitzgibbon (as MHAs for St. John's City West)
- Succeeded by: Oliver Vardy (post-Confederation); James Spratt (post-Confederation)
- Majority: 4,436 (21.62%)

Personal details
- Born: Patrick Francis Halley; May 31, 1895 St. John's, Newfoundland Colony
- Died: July 7, 1956 (aged 61) St. John's, Newfoundland, Canada
- Party: United Newfoundland
- Spouse: Alice Byrne (m. 1923)
- Relatives: John Joseph Murphy (son-in-law)
- Education: Saint Bonaventure's College; University College Dublin
- Occupation: Businessman

Patrick Francis Halley (May 31, 1895 – July 7, 1956) was a merchant and politician in Newfoundland. He represented St. John's West in the Newfoundland House of Assembly from 1932 to 1934 as a United Newfoundland Party member.

The son of William Joseph Halley ( of Clonmel, County Tipperary) and Anne Haw, he was born in St. John's, Newfoundland and Labrador and was educated at Saint Bonaventure's College and at University College in Dublin. After completing his education, he went into the family wholesale dry goods business, Halley and Co Ltd. In 1923, he married Alice Byrne. Halley established the Arcade Stores in 1938. He took over the operation of the family business after the death of his father. He was a director of the Newfoundland Theatres and of the Fire and General Insurance Co. Halley also served as president of the local Knights of Columbus.

He died in St. John's at the age of 61.
