= William Warren (politician) =

Newfoundland lawyer, judge, and Prime Minister (1923–1924)

The Right Honourable William Warren KC
- Warren, circa 1927

7th Prime Minister of Newfoundland
- In office July 24, 1923 – May 7, 1924
- Monarch: George V
- Governor: William Allardyce
- Preceded by: Richard Squires
- Succeeded by: Albert Hickman

Minister of Justice and Attorney General
- In office 1919–1924
- Prime Minister: Richard Squires; Himself
- Preceded by: Richard Squires
- Succeeded by: William J. Higgins

19th Speaker of the Newfoundland House of Assembly
- In office 1909–1914
- Preceded by: Francis Morris
- Succeeded by: John R. Goodison
Legislative offices
Member of the Newfoundland House of Assembly for Fortune Bay
In office November 3, 1919 – August 10, 1926
| Preceded by | Charles Emerson |
| Succeeded by | Harris M. Mosdell |
Member of the Newfoundland House of Assembly for Port de Grave
In office November 2, 1908 – October 30, 1913
| Preceded by | Charles Dawe |
| Succeeded by | George F. Grimes |
Member of the Newfoundland House of Assembly for Trinity Bay
In office December 2, 1902 – October 31, 1904 Serving with George W. Gushue and Robert Watson
| Preceded by | William Horwood |
| Succeeded by | William F. Lloyd; Arthur Miller |

Personal details
- Born: October 9, 1879 St. John's, Newfoundland Colony
- Died: December 31, 1927 (aged 48) St. John's, Newfoundland
- Party: Conservative (1902–1904); People's (1908–1913); Liberal Reform (1919–1923); Independent (1923–1926)
- Spouse(s): Ethel Alice Gordon; Emilie Jackson
- Children: 4
- Relatives: Robert Brown Job (brother-in-law)
- Education: Bishop Feild College; Framlingham College
- Profession: Lawyer

William Robertson Warren (October 9, 1879 – December 31, 1927) was a Newfoundland lawyer, politician and judge who served as the dominion's Prime Minister from July 1923 to April 1924.

== Early life ==
His parents were William Matthew Henry Warren, a surveyor, and Jessie Sophia Warren. He had at least one sibling, a sister, Alice Mary Warren (died 1930), who was married to Robert Brown Job, President of Job Brothers & Co., Limited.

He received his education at Bishop Feild College, St. John's, Newfoundland and Framlingham College, in England. After studying law, Warren was admitted as a solicitor in 1901

In 1910, Warren, along with others including Walter Stanley Monroe, founded the FOMOWA Fishing Club. Warren was an active member of the club.

== Career ==
Warren was first elected at age 23 to the Newfoundland House of Assembly in a by-election 1902 as a Liberal, and served as Speaker of the House from 1909-1914. In 1919 he became minister of justice in the Cabinet of Sir Richard Squires. The Squires government became embroiled in a scandal over allegations of corruption and misspending of government funds and Warren resigned in protest along with three other ministers in 1923. The next year Squires was forced to resign and Warren was chosen the party's new leader and prime minister. His government launched a formal inquiry into the corruption charges which resulted in the arrest and conviction of Squires and several others. Warren's supporters turned against him and moved a Motion of No Confidence that defeated his government. Warren moved to the opposition benches and formed a coalition with Tory William J. Higgins to form the new Liberal-Conservative Progressive Party that won the election a few weeks later making the conservative Walter Stanley Monroe the new prime minister.

In 1926, Warren resigned from the House of Assembly and was appointed to the colony's Supreme Court.

== Personal life ==
He was married first to Ethel Alice Gordon, by whom he had one son, John Henry Warren, and two daughters. He was married secondly to Emilie Jackson (died 1934) by whom he had one daughter.

Warren died in 1927.

Political offices
| Preceded by Sir Richard Squires | Prime Minister of Newfoundland; 1923–1924 | Succeeded by Albert Hickman |
