= Charles Ballam =

Canadian politician (1901–1981)

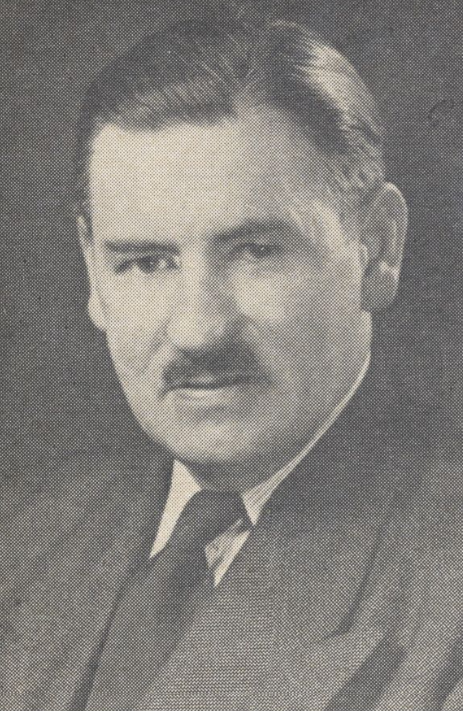
- Ballam in 1952

Minister of Labour
- In office April 9, 1949 – August 15, 1966
- Premier: Joey Smallwood
- Preceded by: Kenneth M. Brown (pre-Confederation)
- Succeeded by: Clyde Wells

Member of the Newfoundland House of Assembly for Humber West Humber (1949–1956)
- In office May 27, 1949 – September 8, 1966
- Preceded by: F. Gordon Bradley (pre-Confederation)
- Succeeded by: Joey Smallwood

Member of the Newfoundland National Convention for Humber
- In office September 11, 1946 – January 30, 1948 Serving with Pierce Fudge

Personal details
- Born: Charles Hubert Ballam; May 10, 1901 Curling, Newfoundland
- Died: December 12, 1981 (aged 80) St. John's, Newfoundland, Canada
- Party: Liberal
- Spouse: Maria Bagg (m. 1927; died 1977)
- Children: 1
- Occupation: Electrician, insurance agent

Charles Hubert Ballam (May 10, 1901 – December 12, 1981) was a Canadian union leader and politician from Newfoundland who served as the province's Minister of Labour from 1949 to 1966.

== Early life and family ==
Ballam was born on May 10, 1901 in Curling, Newfoundland Colony to Manoah Ballam and Alice (née Wheeler). He was educated at the high school in Curling. Ballam served in the Royal Newfoundland Regiment during World War I.

Following the war, Ballam moved to Grand Falls and worked as an apprentice electrician at the pulp and paper mill owned by the Anglo-Newfoundland Development Company. He returned to Curling when Bowater's constructed a pulp and paper mill in Corner Brook in 1925.

Ballam married Maria Bagg on April 28, 1927 in Curling. The couple had one son, Ulric, who was killed in an accident at the pulp and paper mill in Corner Brook in 1945. Ballam and his wife established a memorial scholarship in Ulric's memory which is awarded annually to a first-year undergraduate engineering student at Memorial University of Newfoundland.

== Labour activism ==
Ballam became active in the labour movement in 1929. In 1935, he was elected president of Local 64 of the Pulp and Sulphite Workers Union in Corner Brook. He attended the founding convention of the Newfoundland Federation of Labour in 1937. In 1940, he relinquished his leadership role with Local 64 to become president of the new federation. However, he left the mill behind the following year to become a representative for Sun Life Assurance Company.

Outside of professional life, Ballam participated in local theatre acting. He had an on-screen speaking role in the World War II British propaganda film 49th Parallel (1941).

== Newfoundland National Convention ==
In 1946, Ballam was elected to the Newfoundland National Convention as one of the two delegates for the Humber district alongside Pierce Fudge, another popular labour leader. The convention had been convened by the United Kingdom as a means to decide the political future of the Dominion of Newfoundland which was then under a British-led Commission of Government.

At the convention, Joey Smallwood felt he could count on Ballam for support for the motion he planned to introduce early in the convention calling for a delegation to Ottawa to discuss potential terms of union between Canada and Newfoundland. When the motion was introduced, Ballam supported its adoption, but he insisted his neutrality on the matter:

I am not a Confederate and not supporting any particular form of government; but in the interests of the whole country I would like to see something definite done on this question once and for all.

Even though Smallwood failed in his first attempt to have such a delegation appointed, he was successful later in the convention. Ballam voted in favour of both resolutions, and was elected as one of the delegates to go to Ottawa to explore terms in June 1947. The delegation's report, tabled at the Convention in November, was rejected by a majority of its members, but the British government intervened and decreed that Confederation would be anoption on the ballot.

By the time the 1948 Newfoundland referendums were held, Ballam was a committed supporter of Confederation. He was one of the leading campaigners for the Confederate forces in Corner Brook and the Bay of Islands area in both referendums.

== Minister of Labour (1949–1966) ==
When Newfoundland joined Canada, interim Premier Smallwood invited Ballam to be a part of the province's first Executive Council as the inaugural Minister of Labour on March 31, 1949. In the subsequent 1949, Ballam easily won election to the House of Assembly for the district of Humber. He held the Labour portfolio for the next 17 years.

In preparation for the amalgamation of several communities in the Bay of Islands into Corner Brook, a bridge named after Ballam was built to connect the two sides of the bay across the Humber River. The Ballam Bridge opened on October 31, 1955, and Ballam himself was the ceremonial ribbon-cutter.

== Later life ==
Smallwood announced Ballam's retirement from politics in 1966 and appointed Clyde Wells as his successor for the Labour portfolio. The decision had been made without Ballam's consultation, but he later admitted that he would have probably agreed to retire regardless. He was subsequently appointed as a member of the board of the Newfoundland and Labrador Power Commission. He died on December 12, 1981.
