= Lester Burry =

Canadian missionary and politician (1898–1977)

Lester Burry OC
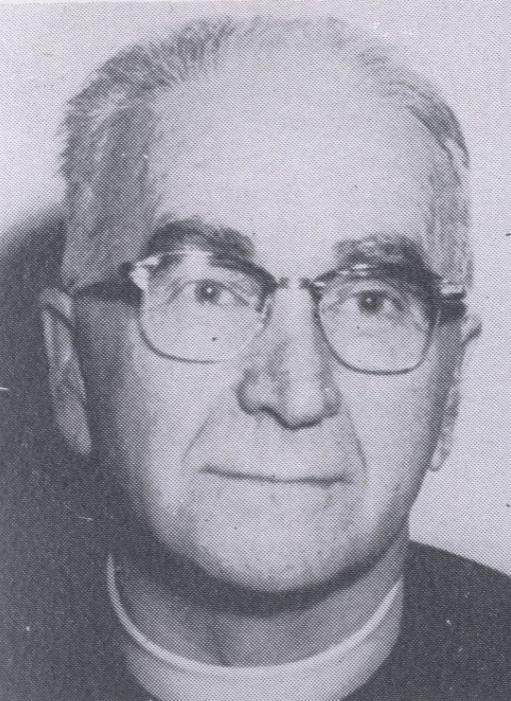
- Burry in 1967

Member of the Newfoundland National Convention for Labrador
- In office September 11, 1946 – January 30, 1948

Personal details
- Born: Lester Leeland Burry; July 12, 1898 Safe Harbour, Newfoundland Colony
- Died: August 31, 1977 (aged 79) St. John's, Newfoundland, Canada
- Spouse: Amelia Penney (m. 1928)
- Education: Mount Allison University (B.A.); Pine Hill Divinity Hall (D.D.)
- Occupation: Clergyman

Lester Leeland Burry OC (July 12, 1898 – August 31, 1977) was a Canadian United Church minister and politician from Newfoundland. Originally from Bonavista Bay, Burry spent much of his ministry in Labrador. In 1946, Burry became Labrador's first ever elected official when he was elected to represent the region in the Newfoundland National Convention. A supporter of Confederation with Canada, Burry was one of the delegates sent to Ottawa to negotiate the Terms of Union.

== Early life and ministry ==
Burry was born on July 12, 1898 in Safe Harbour, Bonavista Bay to Stephen Burry and Marie (née Bourne). He grew up in a Methodist family who pursued the Labrador summer cod fishery. He studied Arts and Theology at Mount Allison University and graduated with a Bachelor of Arts degree in 1923. Burry subsequently returned to Newfoundland and became ordained as a Methodist minister at Gower Street Methodist Church in St. John's in 1924. The Newfoundland Conference of the Methodist Church would join the United Church of Canada in 1925.

At the beginning of his ministry, Burry was assigned to the parish in St. Anthony. While there, he met local school teacher Amelia Marie Penney, and they were married on September 4, 1928. He also befriended fellow missionary Sir Wilfred Grenfell who encouraged him to consider moving to Labrador. After briefly serving the United parishes in Curling and Little Bay Islands, Burry would take Grenfell's advice, and in 1931, he accepted a three year term at the Hamilton Inlet mission based in North West River, Labrador, which then covered most of the far-flung coastal communities of the region.

In administering his parish, Burry travelled by his self-designed boat Glad Tidings or by dog sled in the winter. It would take Burry seven weeks to visit all of the members in his congregation, many of whom were trappers working inland who were far from their families. In 1937, Burry obtained a radio transmitter from the American air base in Goose Bay and set up a broadcast station which, in addition to airing Sunday services, would connect Labrador families to their wayward husbands and fathers.

== Politics ==
In 1945, the Newfoundland National Convention was convened to determine the political future of the Dominion of Newfoundland, which was then under a British-led Commission of Government. Labrador, which had not previously elected a member to the House of Assembly, was given a seat at the convention. Burry was elected as Labrador's delegate in 1946, making him the first politician to have ever been elected to represent the region.

Burry was a supporter of Joey Smallwood's motion for Confederation with Canada. He cited the need to improve Labrador's standard of living and advocated for an interdenominational school system as well as the development of agricultural and mining industries there. In 1947, he was one of the six delegates who travelled to Ottawa to negotiate the Dominion's potential Terms of Union with the country.

== Post-Confederation ==
After Newfoundland joined Canada, Burry resumed his ministry in the Hamilton Inlet mission. In 1955, he visited Israel and Palestine on a pilgrimage funded by the MacPherson Family Trust Fund. Although Smallwood vetted him as the Liberal candidate for the district of Labrador North in the 1956 provincial election, Burry declined to return to politics.

After twenty six years, Burry left Hamilton Inlet and spent the last two years of his ministry in Clarke's Beach before retiring in 1959 to briefly serve as the President of the Newfoundland Conference of the United Church. He died in St. John's on August 31, 1977.
