= David Jackman (politician) =

Canadian politician

David Ignatius "Nish" Jackman (May 19, 1902 – March 23, 1967) was a labour leader and politician in Newfoundland. He represented Harbour Main-Bell Island in the Newfoundland House of Assembly from 1949 to 1956.

The son of David J. Jackman and Catherine Malcolm, he was born on Bell Island and was educated there, at Saint Bonaventure's College and at the Henry George School of Social Science in the United States. He worked in the United States during the 1920s and then returned to Newfoundland to work in the mines at Bell Island. He joined the miners' union and later served as its president. In 1948, the union was affiliated with the United Steelworkers of America.

Jackman was elected as a delegate for Bell Island to the Newfoundland National Convention in 1946. He supported the Responsible Government League and economic union with the United States. He was elected to the Newfoundland assembly in 1949, was reelected in 1951 and was defeated in 1956. Jackman ran unsuccessfully for the St. John's East seat in the Canadian House of Commons in 1958 as an independent liberal candidate. He retired from union leadership in 1964 and moved to Montreal.
