= Confederate Association =

Political party

The Confederate Association was a political party formed and led by Joey Smallwood and Gordon Bradley to advocate that the Dominion of Newfoundland join the Canadian Confederation. The party was formed on February 21, 1948, prior to the launch of the 1948 Newfoundland referendums on Confederation. The party was opposed by the Responsible Government League led by Peter Cashin and the Party for Economic Union with the United States led by Chesley A. Crosbie.

Two referendums were held as the result of the first vote in which three options were considered, Confederation, responsible government or a continuation of the Commission of Government. The first referendum, held on June 3, 1948, saw the Confederation option receive 41.1% support compared with 44.6% support for responsible government and 14.3% support for Commission of Government. The anti-Confederate forces were hampered by the split of the opposition into Crosbie and Cashin's parties with relations between the two being tense and the overall opposition lacking unity or organization. The Confederate Association, in contrast, was better funded and better organized. A second vote was held on July 22 with only Confederation and Responsible Government on the ballot in which the Confederates won with 52.3% of the vote.

Following the referendums, the Confederate Association reorganized itself as the Newfoundland Liberal Party.

== See also ==
- List of political parties in Newfoundland and Labrador
- Politics of Newfoundland and Labrador
