= William Keough (politician) =

Canadian labour organizer and politician (1913–1971)

The Honourable William Keough MHA
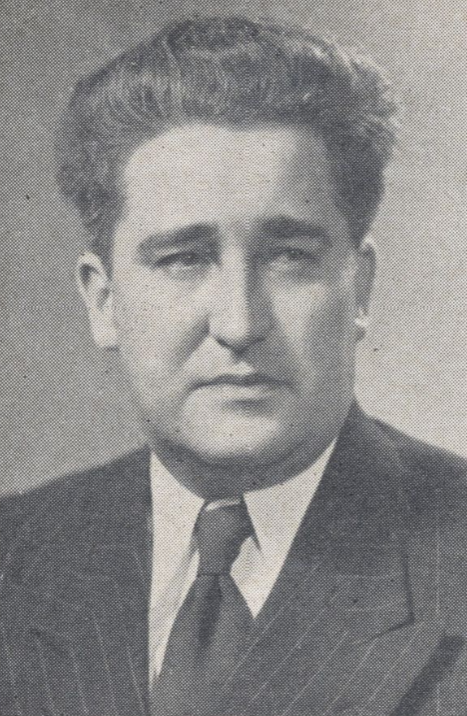
- Keough in 1952

Member of the Newfoundland House of Assembly for St. George's St. George's-Port au Port (1949–1956)
- In office May 27, 1949 – March 3, 1971
- Preceded by: William Abbott (pre-Confederation)
- Succeeded by: Alexander Dunphy

Personal details
- Born: William Joseph Keough; October 30, 1913 St. John's, Newfoundland
- Died: March 3, 1971 (aged 57) St. John's, Newfoundland, Canada
- Party: Liberal
- Spouse: Gertrude O'Brien (m. 1942)
- Children: 5
- Education: Saint Bonaventure's College
- Occupation: Journalist

William Joseph Keough (October 30, 1913 – March 3, 1971) was a Canadian labour organizer, journalist and politician from Newfoundland. He represented St. George's-Port au Port in the Newfoundland House of Assembly from 1949 to 1956 and St. George's from 1956 to 1971. Keough was one of the most prominent advocates of Confederation with Canada.

== Biography ==
The son of Joseph Patrick Keough and Mary Ellen King, William Keough was born in St. John's and was educated at St. Patrick's Hall and Saint Bonaventure's College. He was active in the co-op movement in Newfoundland and was editor of The Labour Herald. In 1942, he married Gertrude Clara O'Brien, who later became a human rights commissioner for the United Nations. The couple had five children.

Keough represented St. George's at the Newfoundland National Convention in 1946 and was part of the London delegation sent to discuss Newfoundland's future. He served as Minister of Natural Resources in the interim government led by Joey Smallwood. He was then elected to the Newfoundland assembly in 1949 and served in the provincial cabinet as Minister of Fisheries and Cooperatives, Minister of Mines and Resources, and finally as Minister of Labour.
