= Chesley Crosbie =

Newfoundlander-Canadian businessman and politician (1905–1962)

Chesley A. Crosbie
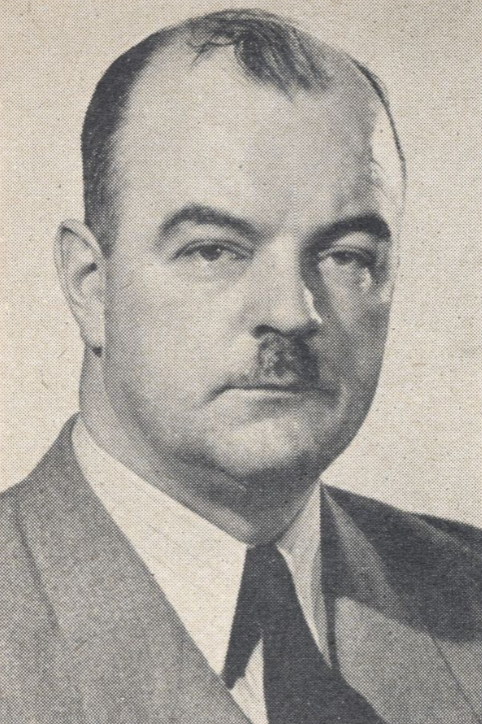
- Crosbie in 1952

Member of the Newfoundland National Convention for St. John's City West
- In office September 11, 1946 – January 30, 1948 Serving with Peter Cashin and Michael Harrington

Personal details
- Born: Chesley Arthur Crosbie; November 4, 1905 St. John's, Newfoundland Colony
- Died: December 26, 1962 (aged 57) St. John's, Newfoundland, Canada
- Party: Economic Union Party
- Spouse: Jessie Carnell
- Children: 3, including John
- Parent: John Chalker Crosbie (father)
- Relatives: Vera Perlin (sister); Ches Crosbie (grandson)
- Education: St. Andrew's College
- Occupation: Businessman

Chesley Arthur "Ches" Crosbie (November 4, 1905 – December 26, 1962) was a Newfoundland businessman and politician.

== Early life ==
Crosbie belonged to a prominent St. John's family involved in hotels, fish exporting, insurance, shipping and manufacturing. He was the son of Mitchie Anne (Manuel) and Sir John Chalker Crosbie, the founder of Crosbie and Company Limited. His father also served in the country's government as Minister of Shipping in 1917; as Acting Prime Minister in 1918; and was Minister of Finance and Customs from 1924 until his retirement in 1928.

== Career ==
After his father's death in 1932, Crosbie took over the family business and attempted to expand it further by investing in whaling.

Crosbie was a delegate to the Newfoundland National Convention and favoured responsible government. On March 20, 1948, he split with the Responsible Government League, the main opposition party to Joey Smallwood, and formed the Party for Economic Union with the United States that promoted free trade with the US instead of Confederation with Canada. He and many younger convention delegates feared that the RGL was disorganized and bound to lose the referendum campaign unless a new party was formed.

The divided anti-Confederation forces were defeated by Smallwood's Confederate Association in the 1948 Newfoundland referendums. Crosbie subsequently served as a member of the seven-person delegation sent to Ottawa to negotiate the final Terms of Union with Canada. Dissatisfied with the negotiations, he refused to sign the final agreement citing objections to its financial terms and retired from public life.

== Family ==
His father, Sir John Chalker Crosbie, was Prime Minister of the Dominion of Newfoundland from January 31, 1917 to December 5, 1918. He was Minister of Shipping in 1919 and Minister of Finance and Customs under Prime Minister Walter Monroe from 1924 to 1928.

His son, John Crosbie, became a prominent politician serving as cabinet minister at both provincial and federal level, the latter in the government of Brian Mulroney, where he fulfilled his father's dream as an architect of the Canada-U.S. Free Trade Agreement. He was Lieutenant Governor of Newfoundland and Labrador from 2008 to 2013. His grandson, also named Chesley but better known as Ches Crosbie, was leader of the Progressive Conservative Party of Newfoundland and Labrador and Leader of the Opposition in the Newfoundland and Labrador House of Assembly from 2018 until 2021.
