= Leonard J. Miller =

Canadian politician and businessman

Leonard Joseph Miller (February 24, 1907 – September 21, 1992) was a businessperson and politician in Newfoundland. He represented Placentia and St. Mary's in the Newfoundland House of Assembly from 1949 to 1951.

The son of William Miller and Julia Green, he was born in Placentia, Colony of Newfoundland and was educated there and at Saint Bonaventure's College. Miller married Mary Reddy; the couple had three children. He served on the first Placentia rural district council from 1946 to 1948 and served two terms as mayor of Placentia. Miller was co-founder and a director for the Placentia Trading Company. He liquidated the company in 1976 and was involved in a housing development in southeast Placentia.

He represented Placentia at the Newfoundland National Convention in 1946. He was elected to the Newfoundland assembly in 1949. Miller resigned from the Progressive Conservative Party in 1951 and ran unsuccessfully as a Liberal in the federal riding of St. John's West in 1958.
