= George Makinson =

Canadian farmer, police officer and politician

MHA for Port De Grave
- In office 1949–1951
- Preceded by: Office Established
- Succeeded by: Isaac Mercer

Personal details
- Born: December 23, 1903
- Died: February 18, 1986 (aged 82)

George Tingley Makinson (December 23, 1903 – February 18, 1986) was a farmer, police officer and politician in Newfoundland. He represented Port de Grave in the Newfoundland House of Assembly from 1949 to 1951.

The son of Thomas C. Makinson and Margaret Tingley, he was born in Nakusp, British Columbia in 1903 and was educated at Bishop Feild College, King's College and the Nova Scotia Agricultural College. The family had returned to the family estate in Newfoundland while he was still young; the nearby community later became known as Makinsons. From 1921 to 1923, Makinson worked as an entomologist and orchard inspector. In 1923, he joined the Royal Canadian Mounted Police (RCMP) in Halifax, mainly serving in western Canada and the Canadian Arctic. While he was stationed on Ellesmere Island from 1927 to 1928, he discovered an inlet that was later named Makinson Inlet. Makinson served aboard the RCMP supply schooner St. Roch from 1933 to 1936. He married Audrey Kathleen Stevenson in 1935. In 1943, he retired from the RCMP while posted in Swift Current, Saskatchewan and he returned to Newfoundland to operate the family dairy farm. He also raised beef cattle and mink and operated a tourist lodge.

A supporter of confederation with Canada, Makinson was elected to the Newfoundland assembly in 1949. He did not run for reelection in 1951. He died at Makinsons at the age of 82.
