= Maxwell Button =

Canadian civil servant and politician

Member of the House of Assembly for Trinity South
- In office 1949–1956
- Preceded by: None, district created.
- Succeeded by: Samuel Hefferton

Personal details
- Born: Charles Maxwell Button; 5 August 1913 New Melbourne, Dominion of Newfoundland
- Died: 1983 (aged 69–70)
- Party: Liberal
- Spouse: Winnifred Barbour (m. 1944)
- Parents: Elisha Button (father); Minnie Thistle (mother)
- Police Career
- Department: Newfoundland Constabulary
- Service years: 1931–1949
- Rank: Inspector

Charles Maxwell Button (August 5, 1913 – 1983) was a former civil servant and politician in Newfoundland. He represented Trinity South in the Newfoundland House of Assembly from 1949 to 1956.

The son of Elisha Button and Minnie Thistle, he was born in New Melbourne in 1913 and was educated there. He joined the Newfoundland Constabulary in 1931, becoming sergeant in charge of Labrador police patrols in 1934. From 1938 to 1949, he worked as a relief inspector in the Department of Public Welfare. Button was elected to the Newfoundland assembly in 1949 and was re-elected in 1951. He retired from politics in 1956.

In 1944, Button married Winnifred Barbour. He died in 1983.
