= Oliver Vardy =

Canadian broadcaster and politician (1906–1980)

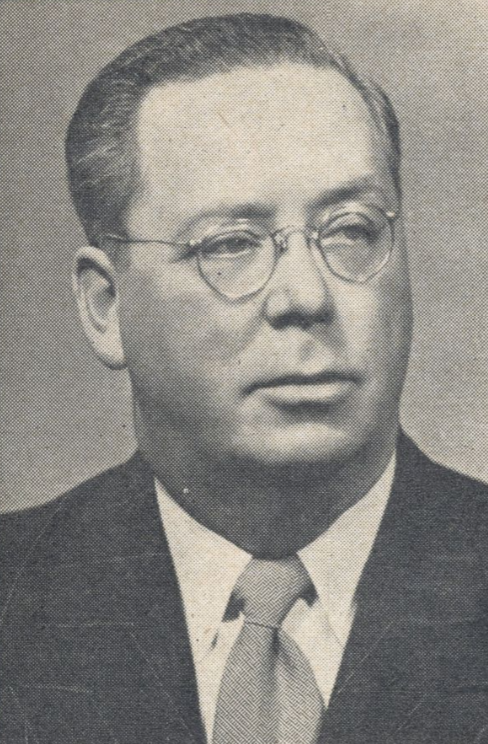
- Vardy in 1952

Minister without portfolio
- In office May 8, 1950 – December 15, 1951
- Premier: Joey Smallwood

Member of the Newfoundland House of Assembly for St. John's West
- In office May 27, 1949 – February 17, 1952
- Preceded by: Frederick C. Alderdice (pre-Confederation); Patrick F. Halley (pre-Confederation)
- Succeeded by: Malcolm Hollett

St. John's City Councillor
- In office December 15, 1941 – May 27, 1949

Personal details
- Born: Oliver Lawrence Vardy; September 26, 1906 Channel, Newfoundland Colony
- Died: April 13, 1980 (aged 73) Florida, U.S.
- Party: Liberal
- Spouse: Adelaide Peek
- Children: 4

Oliver Lawrence "Al" Vardy (September 26, 1906 – April 13, 1980) was a broadcaster, business executive, civil servant and politician in Newfoundland. He represented St. John's West in the Newfoundland House of Assembly from 1949 to 1951.

== Biography ==
The son of Charles Vardy and Lora Rideout, he was born in Channel and was educated there, in Halifax and at the University of Wisconsin. Vardy married Adelaide Peek. He worked in advertising and advertising in the United States and then served time in prison for armed robbery in Albany, New York. Vardy moved back to Newfoundland in 1936. He worked as a radio broadcaster from 1936 to 1944, was an editor for the Fisherman-Workers Tribune from 1937 to 1943 and was associate editor for The Western Star from 1940 to 1941. Vardy served on St. John's municipal council from 1941 to 1949.

In 1949, he was elected to the Newfoundland assembly. He served for a short time as parliamentary assistant to Joey Smallwood and served in the provincial cabinet as a minister without portfolio. Vardy resigned his seat in 1951 after Peter Cashin threatened to expose his criminal record. He was later named director of tourist development and, in 1968, became deputy minister of Economic Development.

Vardy was president and managing director of American Aerated Water Ltd., president of Sanitary Products Ltd. and vice-president of Cousins (Newfoundland) Ltd.

A 1972 Royal Commission investigating leases of premises by the Newfoundland Liquor Commission identified Vardy as an owner of several premises that were overcharging the provincial government for property rentals.

In 1973, he was charged with bribery, fraud and breach of the public trust in the financing of the Labrador Liner Limited mill in Stephenville. Vardy fled to Panama City but was captured there in 1974. He escaped in Florida while being brought back to Canada and was able to successfully fight extradition until his death in 1980.
