= Baxter Morgan =

Canadian accountant and politician

Albert Baxter Morgan (January 2, 1918 – September 19, 1986) was an auditor, accountant and politician in Newfoundland. He represented Green Bay in the Newfoundland House of Assembly from 1949 to 1956.

The son of John T. and Amy S. Morgan, he was born in Port de Grave and was educated there, at Prince of Wales College, at St. Francis Xavier University and at Memorial University. Morgan taught school at Ship Cove and Flat Islands. He became involved in the cooperative movement, working as a field worker and auditor for the Newfoundland government. In 1947, he married G. Parsons; the couple had two daughters. Shortly after being elected to the Newfoundland assembly in 1949, he set up an accounting firm in partnership with Gordon Janes. Morgan retired from politics in 1956. He was manager for Koch Shoes and Gold Sail Leather Goods during the late 1950s and 1960s. He also was involved in a number of business ventures in St. John's. He died there at the age of 68.
