= Thomas Gordon William Ashbourne =

Canadian politician (1894–1984)

Thomas G. W. Ashbourne MP
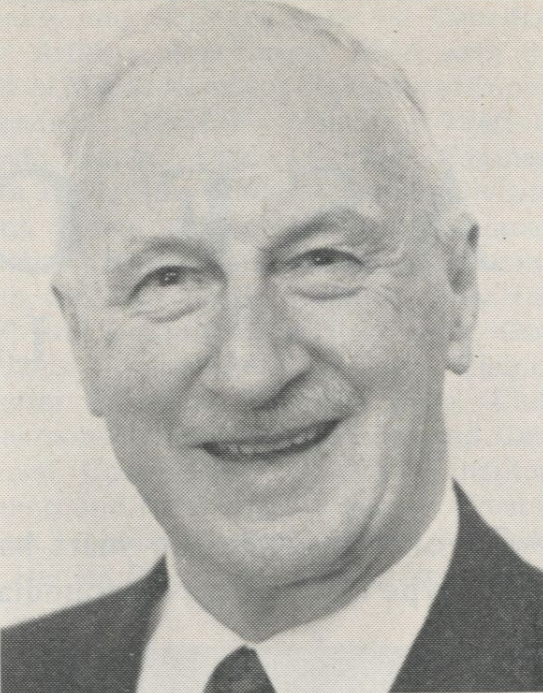
- Ashbourne in 1967

Member of the Canadian Parliament for Grand Falls—White Bay—Labrador Grand Falls—White Bay (1949–1953)
- In office June 11, 1949 – March 31, 1958
- Preceded by: Riding established
- Succeeded by: Charles Granger

Member of the Newfoundland National Convention for Twillingate
- In office September 11, 1946 – January 30, 1948

Member of the Newfoundland House of Assembly for Twillingate
- In office June 2, 1924 – October 29, 1928 Serving with Kenneth M. Brown and George F. Grimes
- Preceded by: Arthur Barnes; George Jones
- Succeeded by: Kenneth M. Brown

Personal details
- Born: December 4, 1894 Twillingate, Newfoundland Colony
- Died: March 8, 1984 (aged 89)
- Party: Liberal
- Spouse: Annie Bernice Roberts (m. 1925)
- Children: 4
- Education: Victoria College, Toronto (B.A.)
- Occupation: Businessman

Thomas Gordon William Ashbourne (December 4, 1894 – March 8, 1984) was a Newfoundlander and Canadian politician. After serving in World War I, Ashbourne served in the Newfoundland House of Assembly as a member for Twillingate from 1924 to 1928. In 1946, he was elected to the Newfoundland National Convention, and he became a supporter of Newfoundland's Confederation with Canada. Following Newfoundland's entry into Canada, he then served in the Canadian Parliament for the riding of Grand Falls—White Bay—Labrador from 1949 to 1958.

== Early life ==
Ashbourne was born in Twillingate, Newfoundland to merchant William Ashbourne and Lucy Goodison (née Linfield). He attended Victoria College, University of Toronto, where he was classmates with Lester Pearson. Ashbourne would later claim that it was Pearson who convinced him that Newfoundland should ultimately join Canada. After graduating with a Bachelor of Arts in 1917, he joined the Canadian Army to serve in World War I, but he was later not allowed to fight due to an irregular heartbeat. He fought instead with the British Army in Flanders, and he was eventually promoted to Lieutenant in the Royal Garrison Artillery. Following the armistice, Ashbourne returned to Twillingate and became the president of Ashbourne Limited, the family business.

== Politics ==
In 1924, Ashbourne was elected to the Newfoundland and Labrador House of Assembly for the district of Twillingate. He married Annie Bernice Roberts on June 16, 1925 and they had four children. Ashbourne did not run for re-election in 1928.

Ashbourne re-entered politics in 1946 when he was elected to the Newfoundland National Convention as the member for Twillingate. He was a supporter of Newfoundland's entry into Canada. In 1947, he visited Parliament Hill as a member of the Ottawa Delegation which helped to negotiate the Terms of Union for Confederation with Canada.

== Post-Confederation ==
After Confederation, Ashbourne was elected to the House of Commons of Canada for the riding of Grand Falls—White Bay in 1949. A Liberal, he was re-elected in 1953 and 1957. Ashbourne retired in 1958.
