= Gordon Janes =

Canadian accountant and politician

Gordon Winston Janes (October 12, 1918 – 1985) was an accountant, educator, business manager and politician in Newfoundland. He represented Fogo in the Newfoundland House of Assembly from 1949 to 1956.

The son of Samuel Janes and Violet Noble, he was born in Pool's Island and was educated there and in St. John's. He taught for a short time after completing his education. Janes served in a Newfoundland field artillery unit during World War II and was wounded and discharged in 1944. After the war, he worked as a field worker in the cooperative movement and later formed a partnership with A. B. Morgan in public accounting and auditing. In 1942, Janes married Margaret Maria Smith; the couple had two children.

He was elected to the Newfoundland assembly in 1949. After leaving politics in 1956, Janes worked as a manager for Newfoundland Fiberply Ltd. He left the company in 1960 and managed a nightclub in St. John's for two years. Janes then built a motel, which he operated until it was destroyed in a fire in 1973. Due to poor health, Janes retired from business soon afterwards.
