= Newfoundland National Convention =

1946–48 forum established to decide the constitutional future of Newfoundland

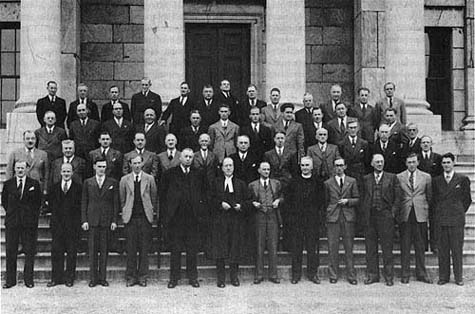
Newfoundland National Convention

The Newfoundland National Convention of 1946 to 1948 was a forum established to decide the constitutional future of Newfoundland.

== Nominations ==
On 11 December 1945 the British Government announced that there would be an election to a national convention, which would debate constitutional options and make a recommendation as to which options would appear on a ballot in a national referendum. British Prime Minister Clement Attlee wanted to ensure that people from St John's, the capital and largest city, did not dominate the seats, so he recommended that delegates would be elected in the former electoral districts and that each delegate would have to have been a resident of the district. Nominations to the National Convention were held on 31 May 1946, and on 21 June 1946 Newfoundlanders elected 45 delegates. Two women offered themselves as candidates, but neither was elected. Lester Burry of Labrador secured a seat, the first time that Labrador had elected representation.

== Convening the National Convention ==
The National Convention was convened on 11 September 1946. Judge Cyril J. Fox of the Supreme Court of Newfoundland chaired the proceedings until his death. He was succeeded as chairman by Convention Member Gordon Bradley for most of the rest of the convention's duration, but after Bradley's resignation, the lawyer J. B. McEvoy served in the chair. The Commissioner of Home Affairs issued pay cheques to delegates: $15 a day, with a travelling stipend of $10 per day.

Observers allowed in the gallery and the general public could listen to the debates on radio stations VOCM, VOAR and the state-run Broadcasting Corporation of Newfoundland station, VONF.

Some delegates who were critical of the Commission of Government used the opportunity to demand that Commissioners justify to the convention some of their policies. However, Governor Gordon MacDonald explained that delegates were not the Government of Newfoundland, but were convened to debate the constitutional options which would appear on a ballot in a forthcoming referendum.

== Members of the National Convention ==
Name	Riding	First elected	Convention stance
P. Wellington Crummey	Bay de Verde	1946	Economic union
Wilfred Dawe	Bay Roberts	1946	Responsible government
David Jackman	Bell Island	1946	Economic union
Joseph R. Smallwood	Bonavista Centre	1946	Confederation
F. Gordon Bradley	Bonavista East	1946	Confederation
Samuel Vincent	Bonavista North	1946	Confederation
Kenneth M. Brown	Bonavista South	1946	Responsible government
Percy Figary	Burgeo	1946	Confederation
Edward Reddy	Burin East	1946	Responsible government
Daniel Hillier	Burin West	1946	Confederation (Note: This delegate did not express a preference for any particular form of government when given the opportunity to do so under Standing Order 39, but they did vote to put Confederation on the ballot.)
Albert Penney	Carbonear	1946	Responsible government
Albert Goodridge	Ferryland	1946	Responsible government
Alfred Watton Jr.	Fogo	1946	Responsible government
William Banfield	Fortune Bay	1946	Confederation
Malcolm Mercer Hollett	Grand Falls	1946	Responsible government
Malcolm MacDonald	Grand Falls	1946	Confederation
Roland G. Starkes	Green Bay	1946	Confederation
Colin Jones	Harbour Grace	1946	Responsible government
Thomas Kennedy	Harbour Main	1946	Responsible government
John A. Hannon	Harbour Main	1946	Responsible government
John Spencer	Hermitage	1946	Confederation
Charles Ballam	Humber	1946	Confederation
Pierce Fudge	Humber	1946	Responsible government
Lester Burry	Labrador	1946	Confederation
Archibald Northcott	Lewisporte	1946	Responsible government
Leonard J. Miller	Placentia East	1946	Responsible government
Dennis Ryan	Placentia West	1946	Responsible government
Michael McCarthy	Port au Port	1946	Confederation
Joseph Fowler	Port de Grave	1946	Responsible government
Edgar Roberts	St. Barbe	1946	Confederation
William Keough	St. George's	1946	Confederation
Gordon Higgins	St. John's City East	1946	Responsible government
Edgar Hickman	St. John's City East	1946	Responsible government
Robert Brown Job	St. John's City East	1946	Economic union (Note: Job did not express a preference for any particular form of government when given the opportunity to do so under Standing Order 39, but he did vote against putting Confederation on the ballot.)
Chesley Crosbie	St. John's City West	1946	Economic union
Peter John Cashin	St. John's City West	1946	Responsible government
Michael Harrington	St. John's City West	1946	Responsible government
Frank Fogwill	St. John's East Extern	1946	Responsible government
Albert Butt	St. John's West Extern	1946	Responsible government
John McCormack	St. Mary's	1946	Responsible government
Edmund Cranford	Trinity Centre	1946	Responsible government
Reuben Vardy	Trinity North	1946	Responsible government
Charles Bailey	Trinity South	1946	Economic union
Thomas G. W. Ashbourne	Twillingate	1946	Confederation
Isaac Newell	White Bay	1946	Confederation

== Proceedings ==
Many delegates believed Newfoundland should return to responsible government and self-determination; delegates sympathetic to Confederation with Canada were in a minority in the National Convention. On 28 October 1946, Joseph R. Smallwood moved that a delegation be sent to Ottawa to discuss Terms of Union with Canada. More motions and amendments were passed in the days following, when on 30 October Kenneth M. Brown, the delegate from Bonavista South, collapsed on the floor of the chamber. Tragedy struck again when on 16 November, Judge Fox suffered a heart attack and died suddenly. Smallwood's motion revealed that confederation with Canada had only a minority of support in the Convention, but it was now on the agenda and the confederates used the radio broadcasts of the convention to tell the people of Newfoundland and Labrador of the financial advantages that joining Canada would bring. The convention adjourned on 13 December for the Christmas break, but the widespread feeling that Smallwood and the confederates had the upper hand encouraged St. John's businessman F. M. O'Leary and others to form the Responsible Government League. The RGL was dedicated to the resumption of the former (1933) constitution for the Dominion.

== The London Delegation ==
In 1946, the National Convention dispatched the London Delegation to seek guarantees of continued assistance if Newfoundland were to resume responsible government. The British government favoured Newfoundland joining Canada, so it did not offer any promises of continued financial aid.

The members (with their districts) were:

- F. G. Bradley (Bonavista South)
- Peter John Cashin (St. John's City West)
- Malcolm Mercer Hollett (Grand Falls)
- Chesley Crosbie (St. John's City West)
- Albert Butt (St. John's West Extern)
- Pierce Fudge (Humber)
- William Keough (St. George's)

== The Ottawa Delegation ==
On 19 June 1947, the National Convention dispatched the Ottawa Delegation to negotiate the Terms of Union for confederation between Newfoundland and Canada. While the British government had offered nothing, the Canadian Government wanted Newfoundland as a province so they were prepared to negotiate support for the new province. There was a limit to that however as it was not possible to offer Newfoundland any special deal that was not allowed other provinces under the British North America Act.

The Ottawa Delegation was supposed to return to Newfoundland after one week. But the negotiations went on longer. Each delegate received a travelling subsidy of $25 per day. The members (with their districts) were:

- T. G. W. Ashbourne (Twillingate)
- F. G. Bradley (Bonavista South)
- Charles Ballam (Humber)
- Lester Burry (Labrador)
- P. W. Crummey (Bay de Verde)
- Joey Smallwood (Bonavista Centre)

At least half of the Ottawa Delegates belonged to the Orange Lodge: Joseph Smallwood, P. W. Crummey and F. G. Bradley were Orangemen; and two of them had been grand-masters: P. W. Crummey and F. G. Bradley.

== Newfoundland–Canadian negotiations ==
Newfoundland–Canadian negotiations were largely a one-way affair, because any union between the two dominions was dictated by the provisions of the British North America Act (BNA), under which Canada had come into being in 1867.

P. W. Crummey had the hardest portfolio. Because the economy of his district was almost exclusively fishery-oriented, he was assigned to negotiate maritime issues. Crummey quickly discovered that after Confederation, Newfoundland would lose control of the Grand Banks because the BNA designated fisheries as under federal jurisdiction. Crummey also sensed that the federal negotiators intended to draw out the negotiations.

== Economic Union Party ==
A National Delegate named Robert Brown Job suggested economic union with the United States. Another National Delegate named Chesley Crosbie subsequently created the Economic Union Party. On 11 April 1947, David Jackman moved that a delegation be sent to Washington, DC, to seek terms of union but his motion was not passed by the assembly. Thus, union with the United States was effectively taken off the table.

== The confederation debate ==
A motion to place confederation with Canada on the ballot was defeated 29 to 16. Joey Smallwood felt slighted by what he called "twenty-nine dictators". Smallwood and his Confederates took the matter public. Newfoundland's Governor, Gordon Macdonald announced on 11 March 1948 that confederation with Canada would be on a national referendum ballot along with dominion government and the Commission.

== The referendums ==
On 3 June 1948, the first of two Newfoundland referendums was held on the advice of the convention. Voters had three options:

- A return to dominion status
- Commission of Government, the status quo
- Confederation with Canada

	Votes	Perc.
Dominion Status	69,400	44.6%
Confederation	64,066	41.1%
Commission	22,311	14.3%

The option for responsible government (dominion status) won a plurality, but not an absolute majority. The Governor and Commissioners called for a second national referendum, one between confederation and dominion status. Anti-Confederates wanted the second national referendum options limited to "responsible government" and "Commission of Government", believing that if responsible government won, it would be in a position to negotiate better terms with Canada.

On 22 July 1948, a second national referendum was held. In the second referendum only two options appeared:

- Dominion status
- Confederation

	Votes	Perc.
Confederation	78,323	52.3%
Dominion status	71,334	47.7%

The confederation option won by a narrow margin, and Newfoundland became Canada's tenth province the following year.
