= 1948 Newfoundland referendums =

Two referendums in Newfoundland, Canada

Newfoundland and Canada

The Newfoundland referendums of 1948 were two referendums that decided the political future of the Dominion of Newfoundland. Before the referendums, Newfoundland was in debt and went through several delegations to determine whether the country would join Canada ("confederation"), remain under British rule or regain independence. The voting for the referendums occurred on June 3 and July 22, 1948. The eventual result was for Newfoundland to enter into Confederation, which it did on March 31, 1949, becoming the tenth province of Canada.

== Background ==
Newfoundland was the first region in what would become Canada to be settled by Europeans, but was the last to obtain either a local representative government or responsible government. In 1832, it received local representative government in the form of a locally elected body of officials overseen by a governor. The British granted responsible government, in which the government is responsible to the legislature and elected officials occupy ministerial jobs, in 1855.

Newfoundland did not send any delegates to the 1864 Charlottetown Conference, which was to discuss a union of Maritime colonies. Later that year, Newfoundland attended the Quebec Conference, called by John A. Macdonald to discuss a greater British North America union. The two Newfoundland delegates, Frederick Carter and Ambrose Shea, returned in favour of a union with Canada. However, Confederation was highly unpopular with the Newfoundland public, and the Government of Newfoundland did not send representatives to the London Conference of 1866, in which the British government and the colonies agreed to the terms of the British North America Act. Opponents of Confederation decisively won the 1869 Newfoundland general election. In 1907, Newfoundland became a self-governing Dominion separate from Canada.

By the 1920s and the 1930s, Newfoundland was almost $40 million in debt, and on the verge of economic collapse. A commission recommended Newfoundland to be "given a rest from party politics" and to be administered by a special Commission of Government. Chaired by the governor, it would consist of three people from Newfoundland and three from the United Kingdom. Backing the recommendation was the United Kingdom, which agreed to take on Newfoundland's debts. The Commission of Government began on February 16, 1934.

Prosperity returned when the Americans were invited to the island by Britain to set up military bases in 1941 to 1945. The American Bases Act became law in Newfoundland on June 11, 1941. Newfoundland girls married American personnel by the thousands. In 1948 there was a short-lived but growing movement for some sort of economic union with the United States.

The British government, keen to cut expenditure after World War II, hoped that Newfoundland would decide to join the confederation and end the rule by commission. Newfoundland first asked Canada for help in a return to responsible government. However, the response from the Canadian government was that it was not interested in helping Newfoundland economically unless Newfoundland joined Confederation.

The British did not want their colony to become an American possession, and the Canadian government, despite being convinced that absorbing Newfoundland would not benefit Canada economically, thought that the annexation would be the lesser of two evils when compared to the prospect of the country being almost completely surrounded by American territory.

Seeking a union with the United States was not a referendum option, despite the idea having some currency amongst locals. With the Cold War looming, U.S. interests in Newfoundland were centred primarily on its strategic importance to the defence of North America. The Americans' ability to maintain bases on the island satisfied those concerns — after receiving assurances that the Canadian government would honour the leases for bases on Newfoundland, the U.S. State Department had no further interest in the political future of Newfoundland. President Harry S. Truman's administration had little incentive to pursue annexation. With respect to foreign policy, such a territorial ambition would have only served to antagonize two key allies. With respect to domestic policy, the administration would not likely have been able to convince Congress to offer statehood to Newfoundland due to its small population and geographical isolation from the then-48 existing states, and would not likely have been able to convince Newfoundlanders to accept territorial status as an alternative to admission as a U.S. state.

== Newfoundland National Convention ==
The British government decided to let Newfoundlanders deliberate and choose their own future by calling a National Convention in 1946. Chaired by Judge Cyril J. Fox, it consisted of 45 elected members, one of whom was the future first premier of Newfoundland, Joey Smallwood.

The Convention set up committees to study where Newfoundland's future lay. Many members assumed that the final decision was due near the end of their deliberations, but the timeline was upset when Smallwood moved that the Convention should send a delegation to Ottawa to discuss a union in October 1946. His motion was defeated, as it only received the support of 17 members, although the Convention later decided to send delegations to both London and Ottawa.

=== London delegation ===
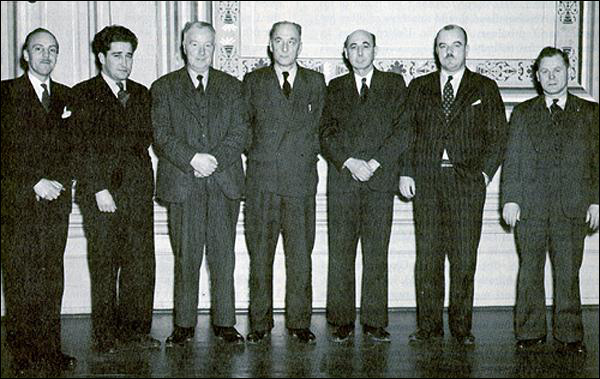
The members of the London Delegation

The London delegation, made up of so-called anti-confederates, preferred that Newfoundland become independent rather than join Canada. The group left Newfoundland on April 25, 1947, and met with a British delegation headed by the Dominions Secretary, Viscount Addison. The British response to the delegation was that it would give no economic help to Newfoundland if it returned to responsible government. The leader of the delegation from Newfoundland, Peter Cashin, gave an angry speech to the Convention on May 19 claiming, "A conspiracy existed to sell this country to the Dominion of Canada".

=== Ottawa delegation ===
The Ottawa delegation, dominated by pro-confederates including Smallwood, preferred a union with Canada to independence. The talks between them and Ottawa began on June 24, 1947 with the goal being to stay in Ottawa as long as needed to negotiate good terms for Newfoundland's entry. Ottawa was reluctant at first because they felt that the delegation was not an official representation of the Dominion of Newfoundland, but the Federal Cabinet finally decided to begin negotiations on July 18. By mid-August, the agreement of draft terms was nearly complete. However, with the death of Frank Bridges, Prime Minister William Lyon Mackenzie King's minister from New Brunswick, negotiations effectively ended. King refused further discussions until New Brunswick had representation, and so the delegation headed back to St. John's.

=== Back in St. John's ===
The Convention reconvened on October 10 and Smallwood presented his delegation's report, infuriating the anti-confederates. Just as the Convention decided to debate the delegation's report, the draft terms from Ottawa arrived. Ottawa offered to assume most of the debt, negotiate a tax agreement, and outlined which services would remain in the jurisdiction of the province.

== Referendums ==
Newfoundland recommended that the British Government hold a referendum on Newfoundland's future. London agreed that a referendum was a good idea, and left it up to the Convention to decide what was to be on the ballot. Originally, the Convention decided that only two choices were to be on the ballot: restoration of responsible government and the continuation of the Commission of Government.

Smallwood moved on January 23, 1948, to add Confederation with Canada to the choices. The debate ended at 5:30 a.m. on January 28, with the motion being defeated 29–16. The British government intervened in March and overruled the Convention, deciding that Confederation with Canada would indeed be on the ballot. They did this after having concluded, "It would not be right that the people of Newfoundland should be deprived of an opportunity of considering the issue at the referendum".

=== Factions ===
Three main factions actively campaigned during the lead up to the referendums. One faction, led by Smallwood, was the Confederate Association (CA) advocating entering into Confederation. They campaigned through a newspaper known as The Confederate. The Responsible Government League (RGL), led by Peter Cashin, advocated an independent Newfoundland with a return to responsible government. They also had their own newspaper, The Independent. A third smaller Economic Union Party (EUP), led by Chesley Crosbie, advocated closer economic ties with the United States.

=== First referendum ===
The first referendum took place on June 3, 1948. The votes were as follows:

Choice	Votes	%
Responsible government	69,400	44.55
Confederation with Canada	64,066	41.13
Commission of Government	22,311	14.32
Total votes	155,777	

Results by district
District		Responsible government		Confederation		Commission of government		Total votes
Name	Region	Votes	%	Votes	%	Votes	%	Total votes
Bonavista North	Eastern Newfoundland	1,269	24.80	3,252	63.57	595	11.63	5,116
Bonavista South	Eastern Newfoundland	2,475	43.16	1,944	33.90	1,315	22.93	5,734
Burgeo-La Poile	Southern Newfoundland	435	11.38	2,780	72.74	607	15.88	3,822
Burin	Southern Newfoundland	634	13.51	3,687	78.56	372	7.93	4,693
Carbonear-Bay de Verde	Conception Bay	2,715	50.39	2,336	43.36	337	6.25	5,388
Ferryland	Avalon Peninsula	3,230	90.48	206	5.77	134	3.75	3,570
Fogo	Central Newfoundland	1,164	27.54	1,978	46.81	1,084	25.65	4,226
Fortune Bay and Hermitage	Southern Newfoundland	886	18.99	2,964	63.54	815	17.47	4,665
Grand Falls	Central Newfoundland	4,477	35.59	5,078	40.37	3,025	24.05	12,580
Green Bay	Central Newfoundland	758	20.78	2,208	60.53	682	18.70	3,648
Harbour Grace	Conception Bay	2,195	64.16	1,045	30.55	181	5.29	3,421
Harbour Main-Bell Island	Conception Bay	6,690	82.56	982	12.12	431	5.31	8,103
Humber	Western Newfoundland	2,996	25.85	6,225	53.72	2,367	20.43	11,588
Labrador	Labrador	263	11.52	1,858	81.38	162	7.10	2,283
Placentia-St. Mary's	Avalon Peninsula	4,034	78.68	780	15.21	313	6.10	5,127
Placentia West	Southern Newfoundland	1,617	39.70	1,987	48.78	469	11.51	4,073
Port de Grave	Conception Bay	1,818	52.41	1,409	40.62	242	6.98	3,469
St. Barbe	Western Newfoundland	442	14.59	1,949	64.32	639	21.09	3,030
St. George's-Port au Port	Western Newfoundland	2,382	36.84	3,053	47.22	1,030	15.93	6,465
St. John's East	St. John's	10,752	65.87	3,838	23.51	1,732	10.61	16,322
St. John's West	St. John's	13,048	65.63	4,958	24.94	1,874	9.43	19,880
Trinity North	Eastern Newfoundland	1,726	32.39	2,554	47.94	1,048	19.67	5,328
Trinity South	Eastern Newfoundland	1,816	41.40	2,099	47.86	471	10.74	4,386
Twillingate	Central Newfoundland	525	14.43	1,569	43.13	1,544	42.44	3,638
White Bay	Western Newfoundland	1,053	20.16	3,327	63.71	842	16.12	5,222
Total		69,400	44.55	64,066	41.13	22,311	14.32	155,777

=== Second referendum ===
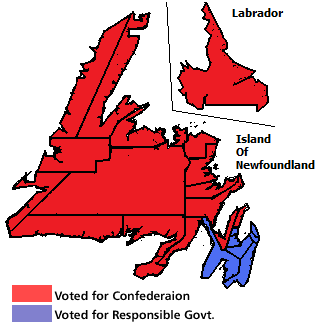
Results map for the second referendum

Since none of the choices had gained over 50%, a second referendum with only the two most popular choices was scheduled for July 22, 1948. Both sides recognized that more people had voted against responsible government than for it, which encouraged the CA and discouraged its opponents, although the RGL and EUP now became allies. The confederates widely publicized the Roman Catholic Archbishop E. P. Roche's strong opposition to confederation, and persuaded the Loyal Orange Association to advise Protestants to resist Catholic influence. The CA also denounced anti-confederates as anti-British and pro-republican, and called confederation with Canada "British Union". Anti-confederates responded that "Confederation Means British Union With French Canada".

The Avalon Peninsula, the location of St. John's, supported responsible government in both referendums, while the rest of Newfoundland supported confederation. A majority of districts with mostly Catholic voters supported responsible government.

The results of the second referendum were:

Choice	Votes	%
Confederation with Canada	78,323	52.34%
Responsible government	71,334	47.66%
Total votes	149,657	

Results by district
District		Confederation		Responsible government		Total votes
Name	Region	Votes	%	Votes	%	Total votes
Bonavista North	Eastern Newfoundland	3,466	74.49	1,187	25.51	4,653
Bonavista South	Eastern Newfoundland	2,730	51.90	2,530	48.10	5,260
Burgeo-La Poile	Southern Newfoundland	3,296	88.91	411	11.09	3,707
Burin	Southern Newfoundland	4,079	84.96	722	15.04	4,801
Carbonear-Bay de Verde	Conception Bay	2,705	52.71	2,427	47.29	5,132
Ferryland	Avalon Peninsula	612	15.43	3,353	84.54	3,966
Fogo	Central Newfoundland	2,438	61.93	1,499	38.07	3,937
Fortune Bay and Hermitage	Southern Newfoundland	3,675	81.40	840	18.60	4,515
Grand Falls	Central Newfoundland	6,228	56.46	4,802	43.54	11,030
Green Bay	Central Newfoundland	2,392	71.36	960	28.64	3,648
Harbour Grace	Conception Bay	1,206	37.68	1,995	62.32	3,201
Harbour Main-Bell Island	Conception Bay	1,431	17.42	6,784	82.58	8,215
Humber	Western Newfoundland	7,133	68.73	3,245	31.27	10,378
Labrador	Labrador	2,681	77.78	766	22.22	3,447
Placentia-St. Mary's	Avalon Peninsula	920	18.40	4,081	81.60	5,001
Placentia West	Southern Newfoundland	2,067	54.81	1,704	45.19	3,771
Port de Grave	Conception Bay	1,565	49.04	1,626	50.96	3,191
St. Barbe	Western Newfoundland	2,353	78.80	633	21.20	2,986
St. George's-Port au Port	Western Newfoundland	3,817	56.73	2,911	43.27	6,728
St. John's East	St. John's	4,895	31.22	10,784	68.78	15,679
St. John's West	St. John's	6,193	33.11	12,513	66.89	18,706
Trinity North	Eastern Newfoundland	3,153	65.09	1,691	34.91	4,844
Trinity South	Eastern Newfoundland	2,593	60.27	1,709	39.73	4,302
Twillingate	Central Newfoundland	2,524	75.25	830	24.75	3,354
White Bay	Western Newfoundland	4,171	75.81	1,331	24.19	5,502
Total		78,323	52.34	71,334	47.66	149,657

== Reaction to the referendums ==
As the results of the binding referendum were to join Canada, Newfoundland began to negotiate with Canada to enter into Confederation. After negotiations were completed, the British Government received the terms and the British North America Act 1949 was subsequently passed by the British Parliament and given Royal Assent. Newfoundland officially joined Canada at midnight, March 31, 1949. At the elections for the Newfoundland House of Assembly two months later, Smallwood's Liberal Party won and controlled the provincial government until the 1970s. Reactions to Confederation were mixed.

Newfoundland as a province secured some significant guarantees as a part of the union. As ruled by the Judicial Committee of the Privy Council in 1927, Canada agreed to put Labrador under the jurisdiction of Newfoundland, after some consideration. Such commitments carried over to other areas as well, such as a ferry between Channel-Port aux Basques and North Sydney, and a guarantee that Newfoundland would be able to continue to manufacture and sell margarine, a very controversial product at the time.

Canada welcomed Newfoundland into confederation, as seen in an editorial in The Globe and Mail on April 1, 1949:

Union with Newfoundland, as everyone knows, rounds out the dream of the Fathers of Confederation. This newspaper is certain that Canadians welcome their new fellow-countrymen with full hearts. May the union be forever a blessing for Canada and to the island which is yielding its ancient independence, but not its identity, to belong to a larger fraternity.

An editorial from the Montreal Gazette also welcomed Newfoundland, saying:

For Canadians tomorrow will be a day of welcome. For this is the day when a tenth province is added to the Dominion of Canada. There will be a greater meaning than ever to the Canadian motto, chosen by Sir Leonard Tilley from the words of Isaiah which describes the dominion that reaches 'from sea to sea'.

The Vancouver Sun also reflected on the results, saying:

Today a dream of greatness, present in the minds of the Fathers of Confederation more than 80 years ago, comes true. Newfoundland at long last is part of Canada.
