= Economic Union Party =

Former Political Party in Newfoundland

The Economic Union Party (EUP, formally the Party for Economic Union with the United States) was a political party formed in the Dominion of Newfoundland on 20 March 1948, during the first referendum campaign on the future of the country. The British-appointed Commission of Government had administered the country since the financial collapse of 1934. The alternatives were "responsible government" (restoration of Newfoundland self-rule), or "Confederation" (joining Canada).

The EUP was formed by a split in the Responsible Government League (RGL), which advocated "responsible government". A group of younger anti-Confederation delegates to the Newfoundland National Convention quit the RGL, because they thought the RGL was disorganized and had failed to present a positive alternative to Confederation. Thus it seemed that the RGL was doomed to lose the referendum to Joey Smallwood's Confederate Association, advocates of Confederation.

The EUP was led by St. John's businessman Chesley Crosbie and "co-founded" by Geoff Stirling, publisher of The Sunday Herald.

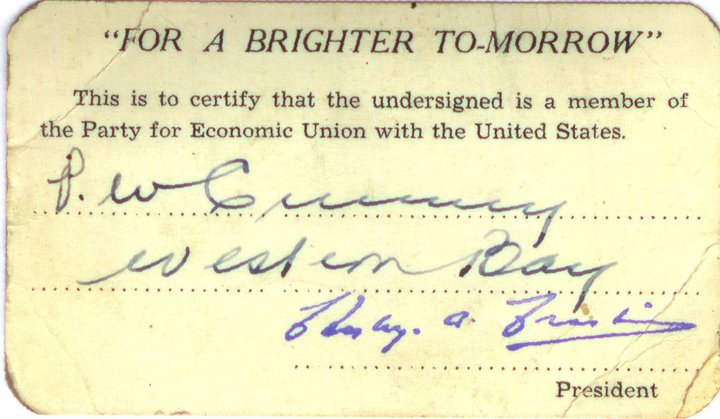
An Economic Union Party Membership Card.

The EUP believed that Newfoundland's voters had to be persuaded that "responsible government" could be made viable again. They proposed to revive the Newfoundland economy through free trade and a customs union with the United States. They also believed that the promise of economic union would give Newfoundlanders a positive reason to reject Confederation.

There was no "economic union option" on the referendum ballot. The EUP therefore supported "responsible government", with the expectation that the independent Newfoundland government would negotiate the union with the United States. The party's support was concentrated on the Avalon Peninsula. Its economic ideas, though popular with the St. John's business community, failed to generate interest in the general population.

Smallwood's forces attacked the EUP as "republican" (anti-monarchist), disloyal and anti-British. The split of the anti-Confederation forces into two organizations caused problems: tension between the EUP and the RGL, and wasteful division of resources. Conversely, the Confederate Association was well-funded and well-organized across the island.

In the first referendum, held on 3 June 1948, "responsible government" won the most votes (44.6%). 41.1% voted for Confederation; 14.3% voted for continuing the Commission of Government. Since there was no majority, the results were inconclusive. A second referendum was held on 22 July, with only Confederation and Responsible Government on the ballot.

The Economic Union Party decided to unite its efforts with the Responsible Government League for the second referendum, but morale was poor and the campaign was disorganized, compared to Smallwood's well-run machine.

Confederation won the second referendum with 52.3% of the votes, and the EUP disbanded. Crosbie died in 1962 and Stirling remained active, through his media holdings, in Canadian discourse until shortly before his death in 2013.

== See also ==
- P. W. Crummey
- Responsible government#Former British colonies with responsible government

== Bibliography ==
- Argyle, Ray (2004). Turning Points: the Campaigns That Changed Canada: 2004 and Before. White Knight Publications. ISBN 0-9734186-6-4.
- Earle, Karl McNeil (1998). "Cousins of a Kind: The Newfoundland and Labrador Relationship with the United States". American Review of Canadian Studies. 28 (4): 387–411. doi:10.1080/02722019809481611.
