= Michael Harrington (Canadian writer) =

Canadian writer (1916–1999)

Michael Harrington (1916–1999) was a Newfoundland and Labrador educator, writer, historian and broadcaster. He served as editor-in-chief at The Telegram for the period 1959–1982.

Harrington was born in St. John's, Newfoundland. He attended Memorial University College, where he founded the first student newspaper. He became the first graduate of Memorial University (B.A., 1951) after its elevation to a degree-granting institution.

In addition to working variously in publishing, writing and broadcasting, Harrington briefly entered politics. He was elected to the 1946 Newfoundland National Convention, and then ran for the Conservatives in the first general election held after confederation. Although he was not elected, he continued to be active in public life throughout his career, volunteering with many heritage and educational organizations in Newfoundland.

Harrington was honoured with many awards, including the Order of Canada, and an honorary doctorate from Memorial University.

== Books by Michael Harrington ==
- Prime Ministers of Newfoundland Cuff Publications (1991)
- Goin' to the ice: Offbeat history of the Newfoundland sealfishery Cuff Publications (1986)
- Newfoundland Tapestry Dallas: Kaleidograph Press (1943)
- The Newfoundland National Convention, 1946-1948: Debates, Reports and Papers James Hiller, Michael Harrington, Published for Memorial University of Newfoundland by McGill-Queen's University Press (1995)
