= Responsible Government League =

Political movement in the Dominion of Newfoundland

The Responsible Government League was a political movement in the Dominion of Newfoundland.

The Responsible Government League of Newfoundland, led by Peter Cashin, was formed in February 1947 by anti-Confederation delegates to the Newfoundland National Convention on the future of the colony. It was one of several Anti-Confederation movements which suffered intermittent popularity between 1865 and 1948 as the issue of Confederation between the colonies of Newfoundland and Canada was debated.

The purpose of the RGL was to ensure that Newfoundland and Canada remain separate countries.

== Background ==
In the 19th century, various Anti-Confederates were strengthened in their resolve by outspoken figures such as Charles Fox Bennett who successfully championed Responsible Government's cause in an election on the confederation issue in 1869. Bennett was opposed to Confederation because he feared the Québécois: he thought that if Newfoundland joined in Confederation with Quebec, then the Canadian Parliament would be dominated by Canada East (Quebec); he feared there would be a whole dynasty of French-Canadian statesmen who would centralize power in Ottawa and ignore the people of Newfoundland; he feared a National Unity Crisis within Canada and believed that Newfoundland would lose control of its natural resources to the new federal government. Both before and during the Confederation debates of the 1860s, there was a "Native Newfoundlanders" movement: The Newfoundland Natives' Society was formed in 1840 to lobby for more labour and employment rights in the forestry and fishery for Newfoundland residents. Also, songs such as "The Anti-Confederation Song" and "The Antis of Plate Cove" were popular at the time.

In 1869, the people of the Colony of Newfoundland voted in a General Election against Confederation with Canada. The Confederation debates were furious and sometimes ludicrous: Anti-Confederates charged Newfoundland children would be drafted into the Canadian Army and die to be left unburied in distant sandy, dry Canadian deserts. There was also vague, xenophobic, anti-French sentiment. Because Newfoundland did not join Canada in 1869, it would remain a separate political entity for a further four generations. During the 1890s the question of Confederation again arose but Canadian diplomats were cold to the idea.

The colony was granted dominion status at the same time as New Zealand.

During World War I, Newfoundland mustered its own Regiment, and sent it to both Gallipoli, Turkey and the Western Front, France. In return for this contribution, the Prime Minister of Newfoundland was appointed to Britain's House of Lords. Newfoundland was granted dominion status and was as independent as Australia, Canada, or New Zealand in this Period. This was confirmed in the Balfour declaration and in The Statute of Westminster, 1931. The Great Depression hit the Newfoundland economy hard causing the dominion government to collapse in bankruptcy.

== Commission of Government ==
Newfoundland's economy experienced many cycles of recession. Its government's finances collapsed completely in the early 1930s due in part to considerable debts incurred by the government in its aid of the Allied effort during the First World War and the large government debt acquired in constructing a railway across the island. Economic collapse led to political crisis. In 1932, due to economic dislocations brought about by the Great Depression, government corruption and a resulting riot and the lingering effects of a large public debt noted above, the Newfoundland economy collapsed and the government was forced out of office. A new government led by Frederick C. Alderdice came to power after promising to ask the British Government to appoint a Royal Commission to inquire into the possibility of suspending responsible government. That Royal Commission recommended a "rest from politics," after which the Newfoundland legislature requested that the British appoint a Commission of Government. In February 1934 the island reverted to something similar to crown colony status. A Commission of Government was established to govern the Dominion.

== Confederation debate ==
Calls for a return to a system of democracy in Newfoundland had been quiet during the Second World War, but the question of Newfoundland's constitution was reawakened by Clement Attlee in the British Parliament. In 1946, a National Convention was called by the Governor of Newfoundland and the Commissioners of Government. In September 1947 the assembly was convened. The mandate of the National Convention was to debate the various forms of government that the people were to choose from.

While almost all members of the National Convention advocated change, two strong factions soon developed. One called for Confederation with Canada. The other called for the restoration of responsible government for Newfoundland, and for it to revert to its previous status. Since the pro-Confederation forces in the Convention seemed to have the upper hand, a group of business and professional men and women outside the Convention formed a sort of political party, the RGL, to counter the effective pro-Confederation propaganda.

The RGL suffered a split on March 20, 1948 when a number of younger delegates and supporters, fearing that the League was poorly run and would lose the referendum, left to form the Party for Economic Union with the United States with Chesley Crosbie as its leader.

The RGL tended to draw its support from The Avalon peninsula, Bonavista South, and from Roman Catholics in Eastern Newfoundland. There were two referendums held in 1948 as the first vote on June 3 was inconclusive with responsible government receiving 44.6%, confederation 41.1% and Commission of Government 14.3%.

A second referendum was held with only confederation and responsible government on the ballot. The Economic Union Party and Responsible Government League tried to reunite the opposition to Joey Smallwood's Confederate Association but relations between Crosbie and Cashin's parties were tense allowing the Confederate League to benefit from better funding and a united organization. The Responsible Government League lost the second referendum held on July 22 with 47.7% of the vote compared to 52.3% for confederation.

The RGL attempted to scuttle or delay confederation through a petition to the British government, signed by 50,000 Newfoundlanders, demanding the immediate restoration of the Newfoundland House of Assembly arguing that only it had the authority to enact Confederation. The petition was ignored and a legal challenge by six members of the pre-1934 House of Assembly that argued that the National Convention Act and the Referendum Act were both unconstitutional was quashed when Justice Dunfield ruled that with the reversion of Newfoundland to Crown Colony status in 1934, the British Parliament was free to do as it saw fit.

Having lost the fight against Confederation, the Responsible Government League decided to join with the Progressive Conservative Party of Canada and form the Progressive Conservative Party of Newfoundland with H. G. R. Mews as the new party's first leader and RGL leaders Cashin and Malcolm Hollett leading the party through the 1950s.

== Sources ==
- The 1948 Referendums
