= Peter John Cashin =

Newfoundland-Canadian politician (1890–1977)

Major Peter Cashin MHA
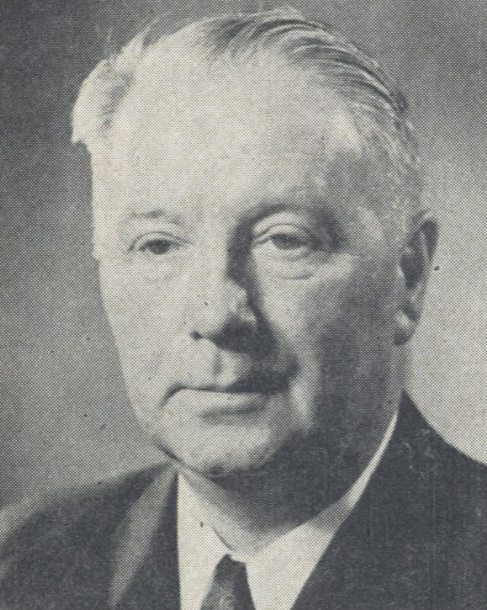
- Cashin in 1961

Leader of the Opposition (Newfoundland)
- In office November 1951 – January 30, 1953
- Preceded by: John Higgins
- Succeeded by: Malcolm Hollett

Leader of the Progressive Conservative Party of Newfoundland
- In office November 1951 – January 27, 1953
- Preceded by: John Higgins
- Succeeded by: Malcolm Hollett

Minister of Finance
- In office 1928 – February 1, 1932
- Prime Minister: Richard Squires
- Preceded by: John Crosbie
- Succeeded by: Frederick Alderdice

Member of the Newfoundland House of Assembly for St. John's West
- In office November 26, 1951 – March 9, 1954 Serving with Oliver Vardy (1951–1952); Malcolm Hollett (1952–1954)
- Preceded by: James Spratt
- Succeeded by: William J. Browne

Member of the Newfoundland House of Assembly for Ferryland
- In office May 27, 1949 – November 26, 1951
- Preceded by: Michael A. Shea (pre-Confederation)
- Succeeded by: Myles Murray
- In office May 3, 1923 – June 11, 1932 Serving with Philip F. Moore (1923–1928)
- Preceded by: Michael Cashin
- Succeeded by: Michael A. Shea

Member of the Newfoundland National Convention for St. John's City West
- In office September 11, 1946 – January 30, 1948 Serving with Chesley Crosbie and Michael Harrington

Personal details
- Born: March 8, 1890 Cape Broyle, Newfoundland Colony
- Died: May 21, 1977 (aged 87) St. John's, Newfoundland, Canada
- Party: Liberal-Labour-Progressive (1923–1924); Liberal-Conservative Progressive (1924–1925; Liberal (1925–1932); Independent (1932, 1949–1951, 1953–1956); Progressive Conservative (1951–1953)
- Other political affiliations: Responsible Government League
- Spouse: Blanche Fitzpatrick
- Children: 2
- Parent: Michael Cashin (father)
- Relatives: Richard Cashin (nephew)

Military service
- Allegiance: Newfoundland
- Branch/service: British Army
- Rank: Major
- Unit: Newfoundland Regiment; Machine Gun Corps
- Battles/wars: First World War

Major Peter John Cashin (March 8, 1890 – May 21, 1977) was a businessman, soldier and politician in Newfoundland. He is best known for being a leader in the movement opposed to confederating with Canada.

== Early life ==
Cashin was born in Cape Broyle on March 8, 1890. A son of Sir Michael Cashin and Gertrude Mullowney, he joined the Newfoundland Regiment during World War I and ultimately served in the British Machine Gun Corps. He returned to the family fishery supply business upon being demobilized.

== Political career ==
He entered politics by winning election to the Newfoundland House of Assembly as a Liberal-Labour-Progressive in 1923, before crossing the floor to join the Newfoundland Liberal Party in 1925 in a dispute over tariff policy. He served as minister of finance from 1928 to 1932 when he resigned from the government and accused Sir Richard Squires, the Prime Minister, of falsifying the minutes of Executive Council meetings to cover up certain legal fees he had been paying himself out of public funds. His actions precipitated a general election that defeated the Squires government but also cost him his own seat in the legislature. Cashin moved to Montreal in 1933 before returning to Newfoundland in 1942.

== Opposition to the Commission of Government and joining Canada ==
In his day he was considered one of the best orators in Newfoundland. Upon his return to the island he embarked on a campaign opposing the Commission of Government which had been brought about in 1934. He was elected to the Newfoundland National Convention formed in 1946 to consider the dominion's future.

In 1947, Cashin was one of the members of the National Convention's delegation to London charged with finding out what assistance the British government was prepared to give Newfoundland in the future including development aid or cancellation of the dominion's debt. The results were disappointing as Britain refused to give Newfoundland any promise of financial assistance.

Nevertheless, he opposed Joey Smallwood's campaign to join Canadian Confederation and became the leader of the Responsible Government League leading it into the 1948 referendums on Newfoundland's status. On May 19, 1947, Cashin delivered this speech to the National Convention regarding the future of Newfoundland.

"I say to you that there is in operation at the present time a conspiracy to sell, and I use the word sell advisedly, this country to the Dominion of Canada. [...] Watch in particular the attractive bait which will be held out to lure our country into the Canadian mousetrap. Listen to their flowery sales talk which will be offered to you; telling Newfoundlanders they’re a lost people, that our only hope, our only salvation, lies in following a new Moses into the promised land across the Cabot Strait."

— Major Peter Cashin

Cashin was unsuccessful in the referendum, though he was convinced that he had actually won and that the referendum result had been falsified by the British.

== Later political career ==
After Newfoundland joined Canada in 1949, Cashin was elected to the provincial legislature as an independent. In 1951, he joined the Newfoundland Progressive Conservatives leading it into that year's provincial election in which the party won five seats. He served as leader of the opposition until 1953 when he quit the Tories to run again as an independent. Defeated in the election, Smallwood then appointed Cashin as the province's Director of Civil Defence until 1965.

Cashin's nephew, Richard Cashin, was a politician in the 1960s and subsequently an important trade union leader in the province.
