= Joey Smallwood =

Canadian politician and premier of Newfoundland

The Honourable Joey Smallwood PC CC
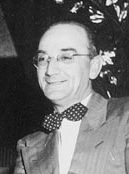
- Smallwood in 1948

1st Premier of Newfoundland
- In office April 1, 1949 – January 18, 1972
- Monarchs: George VI; Elizabeth II
- Lieutenant Governor: Albert Walsh; Leonard Outerbridge; Campbell Macpherson; Fabian O'Dea; Ewart Harnum
- Preceded by: Frederick C. Alderdice as Prime Minister of Newfoundland (1934)
- Succeeded by: Frank Moores

Member of the Newfoundland House of Assembly for Bonavista North
- In office May 27, 1949 – August 20, 1959
- Preceded by: New District
- Succeeded by: Edward S. Spencer
- In office November 19, 1962 – September 8, 1966
- Preceded by: Edward S. Spencer
- Succeeded by: Beaton Abbott

Member of the Newfoundland House of Assembly for St. John's West
- In office August 20, 1959 – November 19, 1962
- Preceded by: Malcolm Hollett
- Succeeded by: William G. Adams

Member of the Newfoundland House of Assembly for Humber West
- In office September 8, 1966 – October 28, 1971
- Preceded by: Charles Ballam
- Succeeded by: Frank Moores

Member of the Newfoundland House of Assembly for Placentia East
- In office October 28, 1971 – March 24, 1972
- Preceded by: Alain Frecker
- Succeeded by: Fintan Aylward

Member of the Newfoundland House of Assembly for Twillingate
- In office September 16, 1975 – June 18, 1977
- Preceded by: Herbert Gillett
- Succeeded by: Bill Rowe

Personal details
- Born: Joseph Roberts Smallwood; December 24, 1900 Gambo, Colony of Newfoundland
- Died: December 17, 1991 (aged 90) St. John’s, Newfoundland, Canada
- Party: Liberal
- Spouse: Clara Oates (1901–1996)
- Children: 3, including William R. Smallwood

Joseph Roberts Smallwood PC CC (December 24, 1900 – December 17, 1991) was a Newfoundlander and Canadian politician. He was the main force who brought the Dominion of Newfoundland into Canadian Confederation in 1949, becoming the first premier of Newfoundland, serving until 1972. As premier, he vigorously promoted economic development, championed the welfare state, and emphasized modernization of education and transportation. The results of his efforts to promote industrialization were mixed, with the most favourable results in hydroelectricity, iron mining and paper mills.

Smallwood was charismatic and controversial. While many Canadians today remember Smallwood as the man who brought Newfoundland into Canada, the opinions held by Newfoundlanders and their diaspora remain sharply divided as to his legacy.

== Early life ==
Smallwood was born at Mint Brook, near Gambo, Newfoundland, to Charles and Minnie May Smallwood. His grandfather, David Smallwood, was a well-known maker of boots in St. John's. Growing up in St. John's, as a teenager he worked as an apprentice at a newspaper and moved to New York City in 1920. In New York, he worked for the socialist newspaper The Call. Smallwood returned to Newfoundland in 1925, where he soon met and married Clara Oates (23 October 1901 – 14 April 1996). In 1925, he founded a newspaper in Corner Brook.

In 1928, he acted as district campaign manager for Sir Richard Squires, Prime Minister of Newfoundland. He also ran unsuccessfully as a Liberal candidate in Bonavista in 1932.

During the Great Depression, Smallwood worked for various newspapers and edited a two-volume collection titled The Book of Newfoundland. He also hosted a radio program, The Barrelman, beginning in 1937, that promoted pride in Newfoundland's history and culture. He was very successful in this job with a voice for radio that was easily recognizable throughout all of Newfoundland.

He left the Broadcasting Corporation of Newfoundland in 1943 to operate a pig farm at the Newfoundland Airport at Gander. He had three children.

== National Convention and Confederation ==
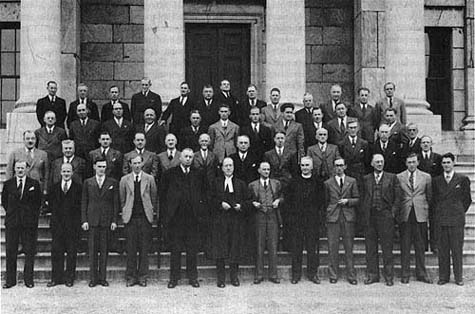
Members of the National Convention.

As soon as prosperity returned in 1942, action began to end the Commission of Government. Newfoundland, with a population of 313,000 (plus 5,200 in Labrador), seemed too small to be independent.

At this point, Smallwood was a well-known radio personality, writer and organizer; he was a nationalist who had long criticized British rule. In 1945, London announced that a National Convention would be elected in Newfoundland to advise on what constitutional choices should to be voted on by referendum. Union with the United States was a possibility, but London rejected that option and instead offered two options: a return to dominion status or continuation of the unpopular Commission. Canada issued an invitation to join on generous financial terms.

In 1946, Smallwood was elected as a delegate to the Newfoundland National Convention, which was organized to make recommendations to London about the future of Newfoundland that would be placed before the people of the country in a constitutional referendum. Smallwood supported joining Canada, arguing that union with Canada would bring prosperity. His skills as a radio broadcaster served him well. He was able to use the proceedings of the Convention, which were broadcast over the radio, to publicise the benefits of union with Canada. He founded and led the Confederate Association that supported the Confederation option in the Convention during the 1948 Newfoundland referendums.

At the convention Smallwood emerged as the leading proponent of confederation with Canada, insisting, "Today we are more disposed to feel that our very manhood, our very creation by God, entitles us to standards of life no lower than our brothers on the mainland." He succeeded in putting the Canada option on the ballot. His main opponents were Peter Cashin and Chesley Crosbie. Cashin, a former finance minister, led the Responsible Government League, warning against cheap Canadian imports and the high Canadian income tax. Crosbie, a leader of the fishing industry, led the Economic Union Party, seeking responsible government first, to be followed by closer ties with the United States, which could be a major source of capital.

Smallwood carried his cause in a hard-fought referendum and a runoff in June and July 1948 as the decision to join Canada (rather than restoration of independent dominion status) carried 77,869, against 71,464, or 52.3%. A strong rural vote in favour of Canada overwhelmed the pro-independence vote in the capital of St. John's. Catholics (mostly of Irish descent) in the city desired independence to protect their parochial schools, leading to a Protestant backlash in rural areas. The promise of cash family allowances from Canada proved decisive.

Smallwood was a member of the 1947 Ottawa Delegation that negotiated the Terms of Union with Canada. He created another newspaper, The Confederate, to promote Confederation. The 1948 referendums resulted in Confederation being approved, and in 1949, as leader of the Liberal Party, Smallwood was elected premier of the new province.

== Premiership ==
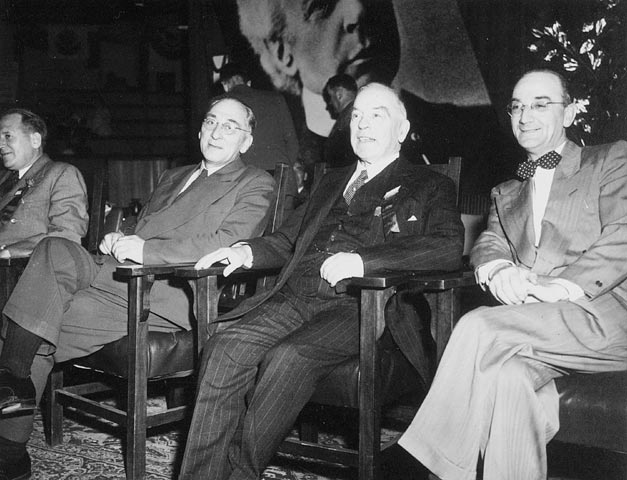
Bradley, King and Smallwood, at the Liberal party convention of 1948

Smallwood ran Newfoundland virtually unchallenged for 23 years. He governed with large majorities for virtually his entire tenure. During his first six terms, he never faced more than eight opposition MHAs.

He vigorously promoted economic development through the Economic Development Plan of 1951, championed the welfare state (paid for by Ottawa), and attracted favourable attention across Canada. He emphasised modernisation of education and transportation to attract outsiders, such as German industrialists, because the local economic elite would not invest in industrial development. Although he had had socialist leanings in his youth, he often sided with bankers and became hostile to the militant unions that sponsored numerous strikes. He relied heavily on the expertise of German industry in his repeated attempts to industrialise Newfoundland in the post-Confederation period. His efforts to promote industrialisation were a mixed bag, with the most favourable results in hydroelectricity, iron mining, and paper mills. Part of Smallwood’s industrialization legacy is the 1969 agreement locking Newfoundland into selling electricity from the power dam at Labrador’s Churchill Falls to Quebec until the year 2041—at a fixed rate that is now roughly one-tenth of the market price.

Smallwood was willing to side with corporations in his drive to industrialise the province. He granted foreign companies concessions to encourage development and even intervened in a labour dispute in 1959. The International Woodworkers of America had struck to get higher wages and better working conditions in the logging camps. In a controversial move, Smallwood decertified and effectively made the union illegal, replacing it with a government-sponsored union.

During his long career as Premier, Smallwood was often accused of being autocratic and self-aggrandising. He brought libel suits against The Telegram and he would threaten to pull government advertising over stories. He kept a tight rein on his ministers, regarding them as extensions of his own authority rather than as colleagues. Additionally, the House of Assembly did not have a question period, unlike most other provincial legislatures. Smallwood announced his retirement in 1969, only to change his mind and run for the leadership against John Crosbie. In the ensuing contest, Smallwood sent Cabinet ministers to delegate selection meetings with notebooks, detailing who voted for which slate of delegates. They brought Crosbie delegates to his residence, forcing them to sign affidavits supporting Smallwood's leadership. The affidavits would later be published in local newspapers. By Newfoundland's seventh general election in 1971, Smallwood's government had become tired and complacent. The election resulted in a hung parliament, with Smallwood's Liberals winning 20 seats to the Progressive Conservatives' 21. The Labrador Party's lone MHA, Tom Burgess, threw his support to Smallwood, resulting in a three-month deadlock. However, under the threat of a revolt in his own caucus, Smallwood was forced to resign in January 1972 in favour of the PCs' Frank Moores. Smallwood was voted out as Liberal leader soon afterward. In 1975, he took most of his followers into the Newfoundland Reform Liberal Party, which elected four candidates in that year's election. He retired for good at the end of the term.

== Life after politics ==
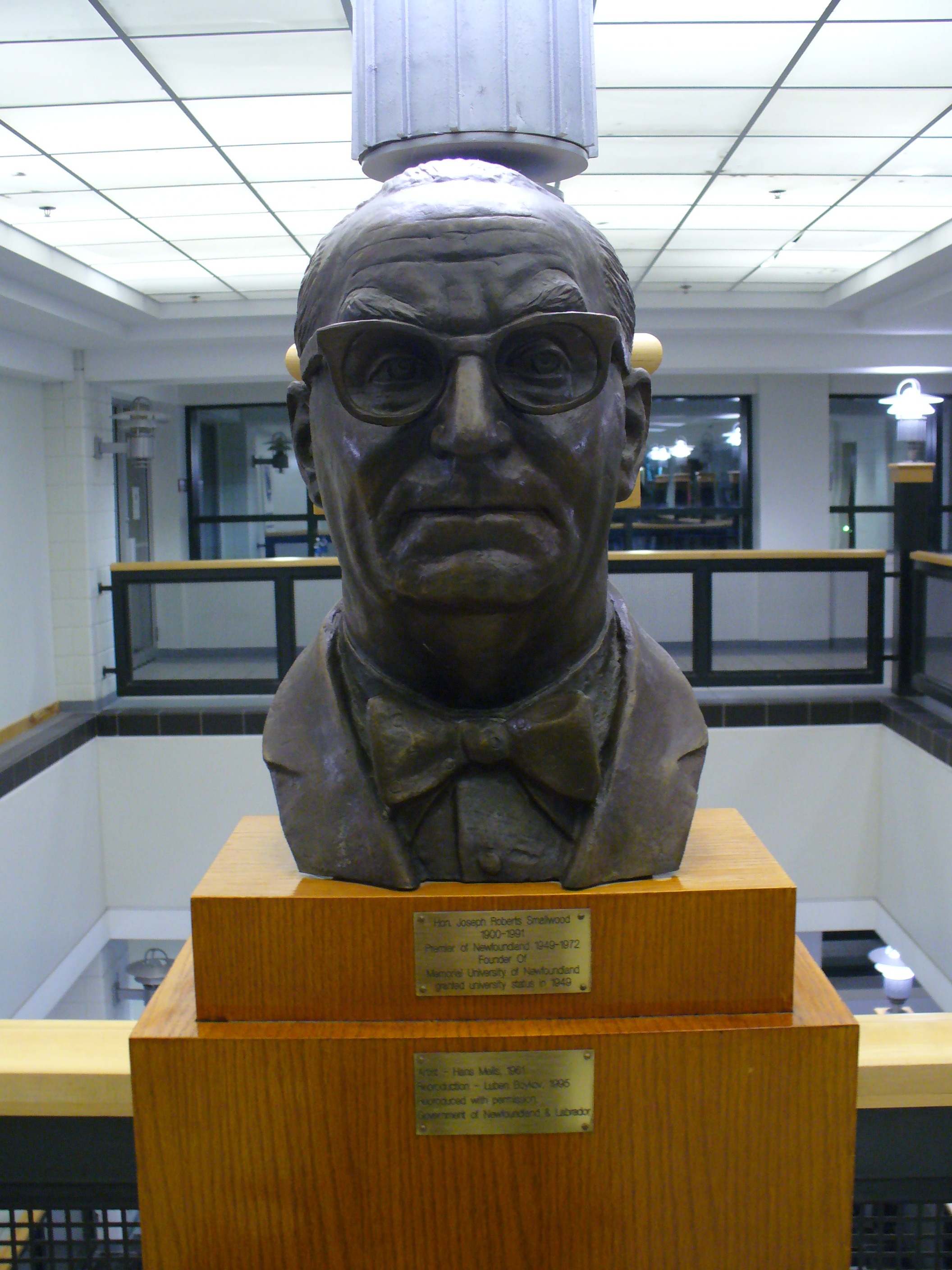
A bust of Smallwood by sculptor Hans Melis on display at Memorial University of Newfoundland

In his retirement, Smallwood resumed writing. His autobiography entitled I Chose Canada was published by Macmillan. A sequel, I Chose Canada: The Memoirs of the Honourable Joseph R. Joey' Smallwood: Volume II The Premiership, was published by Signet in 1975.

He began an ambitious project compiling a comprehensive Encyclopedia of Newfoundland and Labrador. The five volume set was completed by a charitable foundation after Smallwood's death. Smallwood's publishing firm, Newfoundland Book Publishers (1967) Ltd., published Volumes 1 and 2; the Smallwood Heritage Foundation completed and published Volumes 3, 4, and 5.

In 1986, he was made a Companion of the Order of Canada, after hesitating because he felt that he should be more honoured for bringing Newfoundland and Labrador into Canada and he would have liked to have had The Right Honourable added to his name as well as a knighthood.

In 1989, a new Marine Atlantic ferry, MV Joseph and Clara Smallwood, was placed in service; she was paid off in 2011.

== Death ==
On December 17, 1991, a week before his 91st birthday, Smallwood died. He was buried at Mount Pleasant Cemetery in St. John's, Newfoundland. His wife Clara, who died in 1996, is buried beside him.

== Notable quotes ==
"I don't need you. I've been elected. But you need me. I'm sitting on top of the public chest, and not one red cent will come out of it for Ferryland unless Greg Power is elected [to Ottawa]. Unless you vote for my man, you'll be out in the cold for the next five years ... Those settlements which vote against Greg Power will get nothing – absolutely nothing."

== In popular culture ==
Smallwood was featured in two National Film Board of Canada documentaries: In 1970, he was the subject of Julian Biggs's documentary film A Little Fellow from Gambo, for which he unusually received a Canadian Film Award for Best Actor in a Non-Feature at the 22nd Canadian Film Awards.

In 1974, he was featured alongside Newfoundland media mogul Geoff Stirling and director Michael Rubbo in Rubbo's Waiting for Fidel. In 1998, Wayne Johnston's novel The Colony of Unrequited Dreams presented a fictionalized portrayal of Smallwood.

CJON-DT, Geoff Stirling's television station, conducted several interviews with Smallwood, particularly during the years after he left politics; many of these were extended dialogues with Stirling on various esoteric topics. Many of Smallwood's interviews, as well as numerous solo films and speeches he made, are rebroadcast during the Captain Atlantis block of freeform telecasts that CJON carries very early on Saturday mornings.
