= List of shipwrecks in October 1885 =

The list of shipwrecks in October 1885 includes ships sunk, foundered, grounded, or otherwise lost during October 1885.

== 1 October ==
List of shipwrecks: 1 October 1885
Ship	State	Description
Sofala	United Kingdom	The barque sprang a leak and foundered off Galley Head, County Cork. Her fourteen crew were rescued by the brigantine Lantana ( Canada). Sofala was on a voyage from Liverpool, Lancashire to Miramichi, New Brunswick, Canada.

== 3 October ==
List of shipwrecks: 3 October 1885
Ship	State	Description
Martin	United Kingdom	The paddle steamer collided with the steamship Mary Hough (United Kingdom) and sank in the River Thames at the entrance to the Regent's Canal. All 56 people on board were rescued by Mary Hough and the tug Alacrity (United Kingdom). Martin was on a voyage from Woolwich, Kent to London Bridge, London.
Milo	United Kingdom	The steamship ran aground on the Middle Barrow Sand, in the North Sea off the coast of Essex. She was on a voyage from Kronstadt, Russia to London. She was refloated with assistance from the tugs Tasmania and Wanderer (both United Kingdom).

== 4 October ==
List of shipwrecks: 4 October 1885
Ship	State	Description
Alexandra	United Kingdom	The hospital ship, a sternwheeler, sprang a leak and sank in the Nile 20 nautical miles (37 km) south of "Edfon", Egypt. All on board, more than 40 people, survived.
Deutschland, and India	Germany; Russia	The steamship Deutschland and the barque India collided off Bornholm, Denmark and were both severely damaged. Deutschland was on a voyage from Lübeck to Riga. She put in to Stettin. India was on a voyage from Jakobstad, Grand Duchy of Finland to Grimsby, Lincolnshire, United Kingdom. She put in to Christiania in a waterlogged condition.
Fanny	United Kingdom	The ship foundered off Blackpool, Lancashire with the loss of a crew member. She was on a voyage from Runcorn, Cheshire to Strangford, County Antrim.

== 5 October ==
List of shipwrecks: 5 October 1885
Ship	State	Description
Earl of Chatham	United Kingdom	The full-rigged ship was driven ashore and wrecked at Carmel Point, Anglesey. Her crew were rescued. She was on a voyage from Liverpool, Lancashire to Calcutta, India.

== 6 October ==
List of shipwrecks: 6 October 1885
Ship	State	Description
Active	Canada	The steamship was driven ashore and wrecked at Blanc-Sablon, Quebec.
Amethyst	United States	The whaler, a barque was last sighted in the Bering Sea north of Saint Lawrence Island, District of Alaska. Her wreck was discovered on Castle Rock in the Shumagin Islands, District of Alaska, in September 1887; but the bodies of the 43 men who had been aboard – her crew of 38 and five survivors of the whaling barque Rainbow (United States), which had been crushed by ice in the Arctic Ocean off Russia on 14 April 1885 – were never found.
Rimac	United Kingdom	The barque collided with North (United Kingdom) 14 nautical miles (26 km) off Sanday, Inner Hebrides and was severely damaged. Rimac was beached at Lamlash, Isle of Arran. She was on a voyage from Glasgow, Renfrewshire to Valparaíso, Chile.
Sophie	United Kingdom	The smack was run into by the steamship Petrel and was severely damaged. Sophie was assisted in to Dover, Kent by a tug.

== 8 October ==
List of shipwrecks: 8 October 1885
Ship	State	Description
Earnest	United Kingdom	The barge was run into by the steamship Alvarada (Spain) in the River Thames and was severely damaged.
Ida	United Kingdom	The ship collided with the steamship Sunlight (United Kingdom) in the River Mersey and was severely damaged.

== 9 October ==
List of shipwrecks: 9 October 1885
Ship	State	Description
Cherry	United Kingdom	The schooner collided with a steamship and ran aground at Cardiff, Glamorgan. She was on a voyage from Falmouth, Cornwall to Newport, Monmouthshire.

== 10 October ==
List of shipwrecks: 10 October 1885
Ship	State	Description
Atlas, and Catherine Williams	United Kingdom	The schooners collided off St. Ann's Head, Pembrokeshire. Atlas sank. She was on a voyage from Newport, Monmouthshire to Wexford. Catherine Williams was abandoned. She was on a voyage from Lydney, Gloucestershire to Cork. The crews of both vessels were rescued by Petrel (United Kingdom). Catherine Williams subsequently came ashore at Freshwater West, Pembrokeshire.

== 11 October ==
List of shipwrecks: 11 October 1885
Ship	State	Description
Adam Averill	Flag unknown	The Great Labrador Gale of 1885: The ship broke up at Indian Tickle, Labrador, Newfoundland Colony.
Addie	Flag unknown	The Great Labrador Gale of 1885: The ship was a total loss at White Point Cove, Newfoundland Colony.
Alice H.	Flag unknown	The Great Labrador Gale of 1885: The ship went ashore at Mark's Harbour, Labrador. Later refloated.
Annie	Flag unknown	The Great Labrador Gale of 1885: The ship hull was stove in and she sank at American Tickle, Labrador.
Annie McRae	Flag unknown	The Great Labrador Gale of 1885: The ship was lost at Black Tickle, Labrador.
Atlanta	Flag unknown	The Great Labrador Gale of 1885: The ship was lost at Mark's Harbour.
Augusta	Flag unknown	The Great Labrador Gale of 1885: The ship went ashore at Black Island, Newfoundland Colony.
Barbara	Flag unknown	The Great Labrador Gale of 1885: The ship dragged anchor and was driven ashore at "Fishing Ships", Labrador.
British Pride	Flag unknown	The Great Labrador Gale of 1885: The ship broke up at Batteau, Labrador.
Cabot	Flag unknown	The Great Labrador Gale of 1885: The ship was driven ashore at Dumpling, Labrador.
Caleb Corkum	Flag unknown	The Great Labrador Gale of 1885: The ship was driven ashore at Batteau.
Dash	Flag unknown	The Great Labrador Gale of 1885: The ship dragged anchor and was driven ashore in the Dead Islands, Labrador. She was a total loss.
Emma	Flag unknown	The Great Labrador Gale of 1885: The ship was lost at Roger's Harbour, Newfoundland Colony.
Esperance	United Kingdom	The steamship sank in the Ledsund, off the Åland Islands, Grand Duchy of Finland. Her crew were rescued.
Excel	(Dominion of Newfoundland) Newfoundland Colony	The Great Labrador Gale of 1885: The schooner dragged anchor and went ashore at Black Island, went to pieces and sank. Her captain and approximately 21 men, women, and children died. Several men and a woman survived.
Flora	Flag unknown	The Great Labrador Gale of 1885: The ship was driven ashore at Dumpling.
Gleaner	Flag unknown	The Great Labrador Gale of 1885: The ship was a total loss at Mark's Harbour with the loss of two of her crew.
Guiding Star	Flag unknown	The Great Labrador Gale of 1885: The ship went ashore at Long Tickle, Labrador. She was later refloated.
Harriet	Flag unknown	The Great Labrador Gale of 1885: The ship was lost at Tickle Harbour, Newfoundland Colony.
H. M. Curtis	Flag unknown	The Great Labrador Gale of 1885: The ship was driven ashore at Indian Harbour, Newfoundland Colony. She was later refloated.
I Am away	Flag unknown	The Great Labrador Gale of 1885: The ship went ashore at Black Island.
Isabella	Flag unknown	The Great Labrador Gale of 1885: The ship was lost at Mark's Harbour.
John Hill	Flag unknown	The Great Labrador Gale of 1885: The ship was lost at White Point Cove.
Kenmore	Flag unknown	The Great Labrador Gale of 1885: The ship was lost at "Holton", Labrador.
Lark	Flag unknown	The Great Labrador Gale of 1885: The ship was lost at Brig Harbour, Labrador.
Leopard	Flag unknown	The Great Labrador Gale of 1885: The ship was driven ashore at Dumpling.
Margaret Ann	Flag unknown	The Great Labrador Gale of 1885: The ship was driven ashore at Indian Isles, Labrador.
Mary	Flag unknown	The Great Labrador Gale of 1885: The ship broke up at Batteau.
Mary Ann	Flag unknown	The Great Labrador Gale of 1885: The ship was lost at Adnavik, Labrador.
Mary Bell	Flag unknown	The Great Labrador Gale of 1885: The ship broke up at Indian Tickle.
Mary Calpin	Flag unknown	The Great Labrador Gale of 1885: The ship broke up at Batteau.
Mary Joseph	Flag unknown	The Great Labrador Gale of 1885: The ship was lost at Sandwich Bay, Labrador, a total wreck.
Notre Dame de Bonsecour	Flag unknown	The Great Labrador Gale of 1885: The ship dragged anchor and was driven ashore at Styless, Labrador, a total wreck.
North Star	Flag unknown	The Great Labrador Gale of 1885: The ship was driven ashore at South East Cove, Labrador.
Panther	Canada	The Great Labrador Gale of 1885: The steamship dragged anchor and was driven ashore. She was refloated after the storm passed and rescued 400 survivors along the coast.
Peerless	Flag unknown	The Great Labrador Gale of 1885: The ship was a total loss at Holton.
Phoebe Jane	Flag unknown	The Great Labrador Gale of 1885: The ship broke up at Batteau.
Portee	Flag unknown	The Great Labrador Gale of 1885: The ship dragged anchor and was driven ashore in the Seal Island, Nova Scotia.
Racer	Flag unknown	The Great Labrador Gale of 1885: The ship was lost at Indian Harbour.
Rio Grande	Flag unknown	The Great Labrador Gale of 1885: The ship was driven ashore at Black Tickle.
Rising Dawn	Flag unknown	The Great Labrador Gale of 1885: The ship dragged anchor and was driven ashore in the Square Islands, Labrador. She was a total loss.
Rival	Flag unknown	The Great Labrador Gale of 1885: The ship was lost at Ragged Islands, Newfoundland Colony.
Rolling Wave	Flag unknown	The Great Labrador Gale of 1885: The ship was lost at Long Tickle.
Rovers Bride	Flag unknown	The Great Labrador Gale of 1885: The ship was lost at Dark Tickle, Labrador.
Sarah C.	Flag unknown	The Great Labrador Gale of 1885: The ship had her hull stove in and flooded at Domino, Labrador.
Scilia	Flag unknown	The Great Labrador Gale of 1885: The ship was lost at Tuchiallik, Labrador.
Scout	Flag unknown	The Great Labrador Gale of 1885: The ship was driven ashore at South East Cove.
Sherbrooke	Flag unknown	The Great Labrador Gale of 1885: The ship was driven ashore at Domino.
Sisters	Flag unknown	The Great Labrador Gale of 1885: The ship was lost at South East Cove.
Sisters	Flag unknown	The Great Labrador Gale of 1885: The ship was lost at Cuthroat, Labrador.
Snowdrop	United Kingdom	The Great Labrador Gale of 1885: The ship was lost at Mark's Harbour.
Stars and Stripes	United States	The Great Labrador Gale of 1885: The ship was driven ashore at Ice Tickles, a total loss.
Surprise	Flag unknown	The Great Labrador Gale of 1885: The ship was driven ashore at Ice Tickles.
Syringa	Flag unknown	The Great Labrador Gale of 1885: The ship was lost at Mark's Harbour.
Thomas Ridley	Flag unknown	The Great Labrador Gale of 1885: The ship was lost at Ice Tickles.
Trial	Flag unknown	The Great Labrador Gale of 1885: The ship went ashore at Black Tickle. Possibly refloated.
Trixie H.	Flag unknown	The Great Labrador Gale of 1885: The ship was driven ashore at Indian Harbour, a total loss.
Vanguard	Flag unknown	The Great Labrador Gale of 1885: The ship was driven ashore at Island Pond, Griffins Harbour, Labrador.
Verbena	Flag unknown	The Great Labrador Gale of 1885: The ship was lost with all 21 hands at Indian Tickle.
Verdant	Flag unknown	The Great Labrador Gale of 1885: The ship wrecked at Domino with the loss of all but one of her crew.
Village Belle	United Kingdom	The Great Labrador Gale of 1885: The schooner was lost at Domino with all four hands.
Voyager	Flag unknown	The Great Labrador Gale of 1885: The ship was driven ashore at Indian Tickle.
Winfield Scott	United States	The Great Labrador Gale of 1885: The ship dragged anchor and was wrecked at Gull Island, Labrador.
Young Prince	Flag unknown	The Great Labrador Gale of 1885: The ship was driven ashore at Indian Isles.
Unnamed	(Dominion of Newfoundland) Newfoundland Colony	The Great Labrador Gale of 1885: The schooner went ashore at Black Island. Lost with all hands.

== 12 October ==
List of shipwrecks: 12 October 1885
Ship	State	Description
Hope	Canada	The Great Labrador Gale of 1885: The ship dragged anchor and was wrecked in the White Bear Islands, Labrador, Newfoundland Colony and went to pieces. 1Fourteen people were killed, mostly women and children.
Perim	United Kingdom	The steamship ran aground in the Suez Canal. She was on a voyage from Hamburg, Germany to a Chinese port.
Release	Canada	The Great Labrador Gale of 1885: The ship dragged anchor and was wrecked in the White Bear Islands. Twenty-five people were killed, all but six were women and children.

== 13 October ==
List of shipwrecks: 13 October 1885
Ship	State	Description
Eastern Maid	United Kingdom	The ship departed from "Morrisonhaven" for Plymouth, Devon. No further trace, reported missing.
Elida	Norway	The brig was driven ashore and wrecked in Embleton Bay. Her crew were rescued by rocket apparatus. She was on a voyage from Grangemouth, Stirlingshire, United Kingdom to Dram.
Scottish Maid	United Kingdom	The tug sank at Greenock, Renfrewshire. She was refloated on 17 October.

== 14 October ==
List of shipwrecks: 14 October 1885
Ship	State	Description
Albula	United Kingdom	The ship was wrecked in a typhoon in the Ryukyu Islands (Loochoo Islands) with the loss of ten of her crew. Survivors were rescued on 25 October by Marquis of Lorne (United Kingdom). Albula was on a voyage from Hastings, Sussex to Shanghai, China, or from a port in British Columbia, Canada to Shanghai.
Wallace	(United Kingdom of Great Britain and Ireland) New Zealand	Wallace Crossing the bar at Greymouth, New Zealand, inwards from Hokitika, the steamship Wallace caught a wave and landed on the breakwater shelf, becoming a total wreck.

== 15 October ==
List of shipwrecks: 15 October 1885
Ship	State	Description
Melida	Germany	The schooner was driven ashore and wrecked at Allinge, Denmark. She was on a voyage from Riga, Russia to Lübeck.

== 16 October ==
List of shipwrecks: 16 October 1885
Ship	State	Description
Alida	Netherlands	The fishing vessel was driven ashore at Blakeney, Norfolk, United Kingdom. Her crew survived.
Claud Hamilton	United Kingdom	The steamship ran aground at "Willemsrek". She was refloated and taken in to Antwerp, Belgium.
Myth	United Kingdom	The fishing smack was driven ashore at Bacton, Norfolk with the loss of a crew member.
Orient	United Kingdom	The fishing smack was driven ashore and wrecked at Withernsea, Yorkshire. Her crew were rescued.
Phœnix	Norway	The schooner was driven ashore and wrecked near Hart railway station, County Durham, United Kingdom. She was on a voyage from Fredrikshald to West Hartlepool, County Durham.

== 17 October ==
List of shipwrecks: 17 October 1885
Ship	State	Description
Branch	United Kingdom	The smack ran aground on Scroby Sands, Norfolk and sank. Her crew were rescued.
Clarinda	United Kingdom	The steamship collided with Tern (United Kingdom) and sank in the English Channel 13 nautical miles (24 km) off St. Catherine's Point, Isle of Wight. Her crew survived. Clarinda was on a voyage from Cardiff, Glamorgan to Kronstadt, Russia.
Violet	United Kingdom	The ship ran aground in the River Liffey. Her passengers were taken off.

== 18 October ==
List of shipwrecks: 18 October 1885
Ship	State	Description
B. C. Boyesen	Norway	The barque was abandoned at sea. Her crew were rescued by Bay of Bengal (United Kingdom).

== 20 October ==
List of shipwrecks: 20 October 1885
Ship	State	Description
Hope	United Kingdom	The ship was wrecked on Puffin Island, Anglesey. Her crew were rescued by the Beaumaris Lifeboat. She was on a voyage from Runcorn, Cheshire to Pentewan, Cornwall.
Mary	Canada	The schooner was lost in a storm off Petit-de-Grat Island, Nova Scotia.

== 21 October ==
List of shipwrecks: 21 October 1885
Ship	State	Description
Belle	United States	The sloop was sunk off Bakers Island, Massachusetts.
Highland Mary	United Kingdom	The ship was driven ashore at Rosslare, County Wexford. Her crew were rescued by the Coastgard.
Napier	United Kingdom	The ship departed from Pensacola, Florida, United States for Antwerp, Belgium. No further trace, reported missing.

== 22 October ==
List of shipwrecks: 22 October 1885
Ship	State	Description
Bencruachan	United Kingdom	The ship collided with the steamer Bilbao (Flag unknown) and sank 6 nautical miles (11 km) off the Wolf Rock Lighthouse. Her crew were saved by the steamer Methyr (flag unknown).

== 23 October ==
List of shipwrecks: 23 October 1885
Ship	State	Description
Derwent	United Kingdom	The steamship departed from West Hartlepool, County Durham for Chatham, Kent. No further trace, reported missing.

== 25 October ==
List of shipwrecks: 25 October 1885
Ship	State	Description
Dmitry	Russia	The schooner-rigged cargo vessel was wrecked on Collier's Hope, Whitby, after being stranded there on 24 October while trying to escape a gale during a journey from Antwerp to Newcastle-upon-Tyne.

== 27 October ==
List of shipwrecks: 27 October 1885
Ship	State	Description
Harton	United Kingdom	The steamship was run into by Nagpore (United Kingdom) and sank in the River Thames at Ratcliff Cross, Middlesex.
Sophie	United Kingdom	The ship was driven ashore on the coast of Labrador, Newfoundland Colony. She was on a voyage from Labrador to Naples, Italy.

== 28 October ==
List of shipwrecks: 28 October 1885
Ship	State	Description
Eureka	United Kingdom	The fishing smack was run down and sunk off the Dogger Bank by the barque City of Carlisle (United Kingdom). Her crew were rescued by City of Carlisle.
Polton	France	The ship ran aground at Hyères, Var. She was on a voyage from Genoa, Italy to the River Plate. She was refloated the next day.

== 29 October ==
List of shipwrecks: 29 October 1885
Ship	State	Description
Arctic	United Kingdom	The ship was sighted in The Downs whilst on a voyage from Middlesbrough, Yorkshire to Buenos Aires, Argentinat. No further trace, reported overdue.
Sidon	United Kingdom	The steamship struck a rock off "Malpicia" and was a probable total loss. All but four of her passengers and crew survived.

== 30 October ==
List of shipwrecks: 30 October 1885
Ship	State	Description
Badura	United Kingdom	The ship was sighted whilst on a voyage from Cardiff, Glamorgan to Panama City, United States of Colombia. No further trace, reported overdue.

== 31 October ==
List of shipwrecks: 31 October 1885
Ship	State	Description
Anita Vidal Sala	Spain	The steamship ran aground on the Azamool Reef, off the coast of Morocco. She was refloated and taken in to Mazagan.
Charlotte Anne	United Kingdom	The schooner was abandoned off Fishguard, Pembrokeshire. Her crew were rescued by the Fishguard Lifeboat.
Delphin	(Russian Empire) Grand Duchy of Finland	The schooner ran aground on the Shipwash Sands, in the North Sea off the coast of Suffolk, United Kingdom. She was on a voyage from Turku to Tarragona, Spain. She was refloated and assisted in to Harwich, Essex, United Kingdom in a waterlogged condition by two tugs.
Dewi Lass	United Kingdom	The schooner was abandoned off Fishguard. Her crew were rescued by the Fishguard Lifeboat.
Elizabeth Ann	United Kingdom	The smack was abandoned off Fishguard. Her crew were rescued by the Fishguard Lifeboat.
Frederik Carels	Netherlands	The ship ran aground on the Goodwin Sands, Kent, United Kingdom and was wrecked. Her crew were rescued by a tug and the Ramsgate Lifeboat. She was on a voyage from Groningen to Gloucester, United Kingdom.
Iron Duke	United Kingdom	The smack was driven ashore at Great Yarmouth, Norfolk.
Lewes Lass	United Kingdom	The brig foundered in the English Channel off Pevensey, Sussex. Her crew survived, She was on a voyage from Rouen, Seine-Inférieure, France to Newcastle upon Tyne, Northumberland.
Sir Richard	United Kingdom	The schooner was abandoned off Fishguard. Her crew were rescued by the Fishguard Lifeboat.

== Unknown date ==
List of shipwrecks: Unknown date in October 1885
Ship	State	Description
Anna Ottilie, and Marie Annette	Russia	The schooners collided in the Baltic Sea. Anna Ottilie was on a voyage from Saint Petersburg to Flensburg, Germany. She put in to Reval in a severely damaged and waterlogged condition. Marie Annette sank with the loss of two of her crew.
Beppino Accame	Italy	The barque was driven ashore on Barbuda. She was on a voyage from Table Bay to Pensacola, Florida, United States. She was a total loss.
Berenice	Netherlands	The steamship was driven ashore at "Heenrevet", Denmark. She was on a voyage from Saint Petersburg, Russia to Amsterdam, North Holland.
Bernhard Augusta	Russia	The schooner was driven ashore at "Heenrevet". She was on a voyage from Riga to Antwerp, Belgium.
Carolina	Sweden	The brig was driven ashore and wrecked in Lofsta Bay. She was on a voyage from Skutskär to West Hartlepool, County Durham, United Kingdom.
Dotrel	United Kingdom	The fishing smack collided with the fishing smack Industrie (Flag unknown) and sank in the Lune Deeps. Her crew were rescued.
Calcutta	United Kingdom	The steamship sank in the Hooghly River. She was a total loss.
Euplea	Austria-Hungary	The full-rigged ship caught fire at Beirut, Ottoman Syria.
Europa	Norway	The barque was taken in to Grimsby, Lincolnshire, United Kingdom in a waterlogged condition with the assistance of fishing boats and a tug.
Flamingo	Norway	The brig was driven ashore on Amager, Denmark. She was on a voyage from Stettin, Germany to Tayport, Fife, United Kingdom.
Glenfruin	United Kingdom	The steamship collided with Camorta (Flag unknown) and was beached at Hong Kong. She was on a voyage from Shanghai, China to London. She was refloated on 8 November and taken in to dock.
Imerina	United Kingdom	The steamship ran aground and sank at Dyer's Island, Cape Colony. Her crew were rescued.
Island	Norway	The steamship was driven ashore at "Jelsen Moss". She was on a voyage from Christiania to New York, United States.
Jason	United Kingdom	The ship put in to Port Elizabeth, Cape Colony on fire. She was on a voyage from London to Calcutta, India.
Johann	Germany	The galiot sank off Langeland, Denmark. Her crew were rescued. She was on a voyage from Halmstad, Sweden to Hamburg.
John and Mary	United Kingdom	The smack sprang a leak and was beached in Ballycotton Bay. She was on a voyage from Youghal, County Cork to Cork.
Katie	United Kingdom	The schooner was driven ashore at Barry Island, Glamorgan. Her crew were rescued. She subsequentlyb floated off.
Lilian Baxter	Canada	The fishing schooner was abandoned in the Atlantic Ocean. Two crew were rescued by William Duthie (United Kingdom).
Madge Wildfire	United Kingdom	The full-rigged ship was driven ashore and wrecked on Scatarie Island, Nova Scotia.
Marseille	France	The steamship ran aground at Saigon, French Indo-China and was damaged. She was on a voyage from Nouméa, New Caledonia to Saigon. She was refloated and taken in to Saigon.
Mary Lester	United Kingdom	The brigantine was driven ashore at Rhyl, Denbighshire.
May Flower	United Kingdom	The ship was driven ashore and sank at Cemaes, Anglesey.
Moronna	Norway	The brigantine was driven ashore on Saltholm, Denmark. She was on a voyage from Kotka, Grand Duchy of Finland to La Rochelle, Charente-Inférieure, France.
Neerlands Vlag	Netherlands	The barque was driven ashore near Hudiksvall, Sweden.
Nordstjernen	Norway	The ship ran aground on the Inner Binks, off the mouth of the Humber. Her eight crew were rescued by the Spurn Lifeboat. She was taken in to Hull, Yorkshire, United Kingdom in a wrecked condition on 22 October.
Pearl	United Kingdom	The schooner was driven ashore at Dungeness, Kent. She was on a voyage from Hartlepool, County Durham to Yarmouth, Isle of Wight. She was refloated and put in to Dover, Kent in a leaky condition.
Potaro	United Kingdom	The steamship was driven ashore at Woolacombe, Devon. She was on a voyage from Liverpool, Lancashire to Cardiff, Glamorgan.
Roehampton	United Kingdom	The ship was driven ashore and damaged at "Shadb-el-Kafir", Hejaz Vilayet.
Rosalie	United Kingdom	The schooner was driven ashore and wrecked in the Bay of Fundy.
Silurian	United Kingdom	The ship was severely damaged by fire in the River Plate.
Strathtay	United Kingdom	The steamship was driven ashore and wrecked on Lambay Island. Her crew survived. She was on a voyage from Glasgow, Renfrewshire to Dublin.
Sultana	United Kingdom	The steamship ran aground in the Savannah River.
Tagal	Norway	The barque was driven ashore at Falhead, Gotland, Sweden. She was on a voyage from Kotka to London. She had become a wreck by 26 October.
Talisman	United Kingdom	The ship was abandoned in the Atlantic Ocean. Her crew were rescued. She was on a voyage from Pensacola, Florida, United States to Glasgow.
Taunton	United Kingdom	The ketch was driven ashore at Kenfig, Glamorgan. She was refloated in late January 1886 and towed in to Portcawl, Glamorgan.
T. J. Robson	United Kingdom	The steamship ran aground in the Dardanelles. She was on a voyage from Leith, Lothian to Odesa, Russia.
Troutbeck	United Kingdom	The steamship ran aground at Blyth, Northumberland.
Trust	United Kingdom	The ship was lost. She was on a voyage from the Bonavista Peninsula, Newfoundland Colony to Antwerp.
Ulrika	Sweden	The barque was driven ashore on Öland. She was on a voyage from Skutskär to a Spanish port.
251	Russia	The lighter sprang a leak and sank at Kronstadt.
Many unnamed vessels	Flags unknown	An estimated eighty fishing craft were wrecked or were driven ashore during a storm on the coast of Labrador, Newfoundland Colony and 300 lives were lost on the night of 11–12 October.
