= Marie Penny =

Canadian businesswoman

Marie Penny (born 1896, d. 1970), also spelled Penney, was a Canadian businesswoman who owned and operated one of the largest frozen-fish companies in Newfoundland during the 20th century. She operated John Penny & Sons in Ramea from 1949 until her death in 1970, becoming known locally as "Queen of the Coast", and in 1967 she was the first female president of the Fisheries Council of Canada. Her husband, George Penny, briefly served as one of the first Newfoundland members of the Canadian Senate.

== Early life ==
Marie Penny was born Marie Smart at Little Bay, Newfoundland to Michael Smart and Mary Margaret Jackman. Michael Smart was a telegraph operator and moved the family around Newfoundland, eventually settling in Port aux Basques. Marie was the grand daughter of James Jackman, brother to the legendary captains William and Arthur Jackman.

== Marriage and career ==
Marie married George Penny, also known as John, who had recently inherited his family's fishing business, John Penny & Sons, at the village of Ramea.

Although John Penny & Sons was not doing well at the time of her marriage, Marie Penny began to play a central role in strengthening and directing the business. In recognition of changing times, she encouraged the company's transition from salted fish to fresh fish products, utilizing new freezing-plant technology.

By 1948, business was booming, and Penny made a donation of $25,000 to the Liberal Party of Canada, which at the time was considering her husband for a candidacy in the upcoming federal election. In August 1949, George Penny was elected to Senate as a Liberal member, one of the first three Canadian Senate members from Newfoundland, but he died unexpectedly three months later while in Ottawa.

After her husband's death, Marie Penny took full control of the business, assisted by her daughter Margaret. At the time, she had a fleet of ten fishing vessels and one supermarket. By the end of her career, she had directed the operations of two fishing companies, three fishing plants, and multiple retail stories.

John Penny & Sons became one of the largest frozen-fish companies in Newfoundland, and received a number of substantial loans from the provincial government. Penny had several nicknames locally, including "Queen of the Fishing Fleet", "Queen of the Coast" and "Queen of the Ramea". She was once invited by the Governor General of Canada to meet Queen Elizabeth II at a dinner at Rideau Hall, an event which she considered one of the highlights of her life. Although it was common for merchant families in Newfoundland to live in the larger city of St. John's, Penny continued living at Ramea for the rest of her life. She entertained guests in her house and served Spanish sherry imported by her own ships.

In 1967, Penny became the first female president of the Fisheries Council of Canada, a national organization of Canadian fishing companies.

Canadian author Farley Mowat once met Penny during a visit to Ramea, and later wrote about the encounter in his book Bay of Spirits (2006).

== Death ==
Penny died in 1970. After her death, Penny's daughter Margaret took over the company, operating it until John Penny & Sons was absorbed into Fishery Products International in 1982.
