= Edward Michael Jackman =

Newfoundland politician (1868–1916)

The Honourable Edward M. Jackman MHA
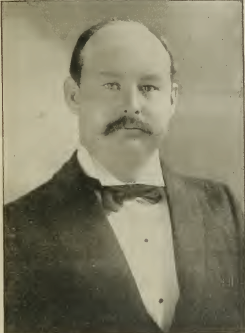
- Jackman in 1905

Minister of Finance and Customs
- In office 1901 – May 8, 1909
- Prime Minister: Robert Bond
- Preceded by: John Cowan
- Succeeded by: Michael Cashin

Member of the Newfoundland House of Assembly for Placentia and St. Mary's
- In office November 8, 1900 – May 8, 1909 Serving with Thomas Bonia (1900–1908); Richard T. McGrath (1900–1904); Michael S. Sullivan (1904–1909); James Davis (1908–1909)
- Preceded by: Rhodie Callahan; Michael H. Carty
- Succeeded by: Richard Devereaux; William R. Howley; Frank Morris

Personal details
- Born: February 29, 1868 St. John's, Newfoundland Colony
- Died: July 20, 1916 (aged 48) Montreal, Quebec, Canada
- Party: Liberal
- Spouse: Alice F. Walsh (m. 1890)
- Children: 7
- Relatives: Arthur Jackman (uncle); William Jackman (uncle)
- Occupation: Tailor, businessman

Edward Michael Jackman (February 29, 1868 – July 20, 1916) was a businessman and politician in Newfoundland. As a Liberal supporter of Premier Robert Bond, he represented Placentia and St. Mary's in the Newfoundland House of Assembly from 1900 to 1909.

He was born in St. John's, the son of Michael Jackman and Margaret Lanigan, and was educated there. He apprenticed as a tailor and worked in Boston and New York City before returning to St. John's in 1889 and setting up his own business. In 1890, Jackman married Alice F. Walsh. For a time, he was president of the tailors' union. Jackman served in the Executive Council as Minister of Finance and Customs. He was defeated when he ran for reelection in 1909. Jackman took part in a series of negotiations on union with Canada in 1915 and 1916; those negotiations were unsuccessful mainly because of William Coaker's opposition to the idea. Jackman died in Montreal at the age of 48 while visiting there on business.
