= Samuel J. Foote =

Newfoundland politician (1873–1936)

The Honourable Samuel J. Foote MHA

Minister of Finance and Customs
- In office August 1928 – October 29, 1928
- Prime Minister: Frederick C. Alderdice
- Preceded by: John Crosbie
- Succeeded by: Peter Cashin

Minister without portfolio
- In office 1932–1934
- Prime Minister: Frederick C. Alderdice
- In office 1919 – May 1924
- Prime Minister: Richard Squires; William Warren
Legislative offices
Member of the Newfoundland House of Assembly for Burin
In office June 11, 1932 – February 16, 1934
Preceded by	H. B. C. Lake (as MHA for Burin West); James A. Winter (as MHA for Burin East)
Succeeded by	Phillip Forsey (post-Confederation)
In office November 3, 1919 – June 2, 1924 Serving with John T. Cheeseman (1919–1923); George C. Harris (1923–1924)
Preceded by	John S. Currie; Thomas LeFeuvre
Succeeded by	H. B. C. Lake; J. J. Long

Personal details
- Born: Samuel James Foote; April 23, 1873 Grand Bank, Newfoundland Colony
- Died: December 8, 1936 (aged 63) Buffalo, New York, U.S.
- Party: Liberal (1919–1924); Liberal-Conservative Progressive (1928–1932); United Newfoundland (1932–1934)
- Education: Frazee Business College; Mount Allison University; Dalhousie University
- Occupation: Lawyer

Samuel James Foote (April 23, 1873 – December 8, 1936) was a lawyer and political figure in Newfoundland. He represented Burin from 1919 to 1924 and from 1932 to 1934 in the Newfoundland and Labrador House of Assembly.

He was born in Grand Bank and received his education there, in St. John's, at Frazee Business College in Halifax, at Mount Allison University and at Dalhousie University. He articled in law and was called to the Nova Scotia bar in 1899. He was later called to the Newfoundland bar, entering practice with James A. Winter. Foote ran unsuccessfully for a seat in the Newfoundland assembly in 1904. He served in the Executive Council as a minister without portfolio. Foote and three other cabinet members resigned from cabinet in 1923 after Richard Squires refused to remove Alexander Campbell, who had been accused of misuse of government funds, from the Executive Council. He later served again as a minister without portfolio in the government of William Warren. He was defeated when he ran for election to the assembly for Burin West in 1928 but was then elected again in 1932.

Foote helped found Bell Island Tramways, later serving as a director for the company, and also played a role in establishing a pulp and paper mill at Corner Brook.

Foote died in Buffalo, New York at the age of 53.
