= J. J. Long =

Newfoundland politician (1891–1945)

J. J. Long MHA
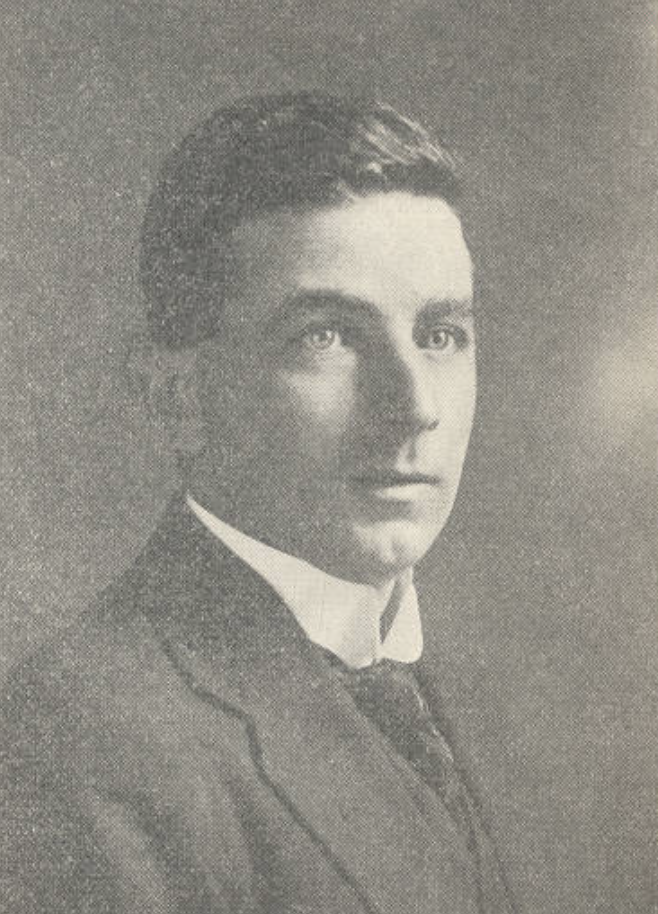
- Long in 1927

Minister without portfolio
- In office 1924–1928
- Prime Minister: Walter Monroe

Member of the Newfoundland House of Assembly for Burin
- In office June 2, 1924 – October 29, 1928 Serving with H. B. C. Lake
- Preceded by: George C. Harris; Samuel J. Foote
- Succeeded by: James A. Winter (as MHA for Burin East)

Personal details
- Born: March 28, 1891 St. John's, Newfoundland Colony
- Died: January 12, 1945 (aged 53) St. John's, Newfoundland
- Party: Liberal-Conservative
- Occupation: Merchant

Joseph James Long (March 28, 1891 – January 12, 1945) was a merchant and politician in Newfoundland. As a member of the Liberal-Conservative party supporting prime minister Walter S. Monroe, Long was the member of the Newfoundland House of Assembly (MHA) for Burin from 1924 to 1928. He served as a Minister without portfolio in Monroe's cabinet.

== Business career ==
Long was born on March 28, 1891, in St. John's as the son of William Long and Harriett (née Walton). After graduating from the local Presbyterian College, he began working as a clerk for Samuel Milley. Long established his own business in 1914 called the Newfoundland and Labrador Export Company. His enterprise greatly expanded after he purchased the premises of J. W. Hodge in Fogo. He subsequently became a major supplier for fishermen in the Notre Dame Bay area.

== Politics ==
Long first entered politics when he unsuccessfully ran as the Liberal-Labour-Progressive candidate for the district of Fogo in the 1923 election, which he lost to Fishermen's Protective Union (FPU) candidate George F. Grimes. In the subsequent 1924 election, Long instead ran for the multi-member district of Burin as a Liberal-Conservative Progressive candidate and won. Upon his election, Long was appointed to the cabinet of prime minister Walter Monroe as a Minister without portfolio. He also served as the president of the Newfoundland Board of Trade.

Long chose to retire in the 1928 election after Monroe left office. He died in St. John's on January 12, 1945.
