= Domino, Newfoundland and Labrador =

Domino
- Abandoned settlement
- Interactive map of Domino
- Coordinates: 53°27′59″N 55°46′33″W
- Country: Canada
- Province: Newfoundland and Labrador
- Time zone: UTC−3:30 (NST)
  - Summer (DST): UTC−2:30 (NDT)

Domino is a former settlement on the Island of Ponds in Labrador. Domino is located on the east side of a cove named Salmon Bight. What remains of the community has been absorbed into the neighbouring settlement of Black Tickle, located on the west side of the cove. The area is sometimes still referred to as Black Tickle–Domino.
