= Leo Murphy =

Leo Murphy may refer to:

- Leo Murphy (Australian footballer), Australian rules footballer
- Leo Murphy (baseball), catcher in Major League Baseball
- Leo Murphy (Gaelic footballer), Northern Irish Gaelic footballer
- Leo J. Murphy, merchant and politician in Newfoundland
