= H. B. C. Lake =

Newfoundland politician

H. B. Clyde Lake MHA

Member of the Newfoundland House of Assembly for Burin West Burin (1924–1928)
- In office 2 June 1924 – 11 June 1932 Serving with J. J. Long (1924–1928)
- Preceded by: George Harris; Samuel Foote
- Succeeded by: Samuel Foote

Personal details
- Born: Harold Bertram Clyde Lake; August 4, 1884 Fortune, Newfoundland Colony
- Died: September 4, 1965 (aged 81) St. John's, Newfoundland, Canada
- Party: Liberal-Conservative Progressive (1924–1926); Liberal-Progressive (1926–1928); Liberal (1928–1932)
- Spouse: Sarah Valetta Spencer (m. 1909)
- Occupation: Schooner captain

Harold Bertram Clyde Lake (1884 – September 1965) was a businessman and political figure in Newfoundland. He represented Burin as a Liberal-Conservative from 1924 to 1928 and Burin West as a Liberal from 1928 to 1932 in the Newfoundland and Labrador House of Assembly.

He was born in Fortune, the son of Philip E. Lake and Edith Purchase, and was educated in Fortune and in St. John's. He worked as a deck hand, later becoming master of his own schooner and later went into business. Lake married Sarah Valetta Spencer. Elected as a Liberal-Conservative in 1924, he changed allegiance to the Liberal-Progressive party in 1926. Lake served as Minister of Marine and Fishery in the Newfoundland cabinet. Following the Burin tsunami in 1929, he became chair of the Earthquake Relief Committee. Lake also served on the committee charged with investigating the explosion of the SS Viking and served as president of the Permanent Marine Disaster Fund. By 1948, his company was the largest exporter of salt fish in Newfoundland. Lake died in St. John's in 1965.
