= James Winter =

James Winter may refer to:

- James Spearman Winter (1845–1911), Newfoundland politician and Premier
- James A. Winter (1886–1971), his son, lawyer and political figure in Newfoundland and Labrador

== See also ==
- Jamie Winter (born 1985), Scottish football player
