= William R. Howley =

Newfoundland lawyer and politician (1875–1941)

The Honourable William Howley KC MHA
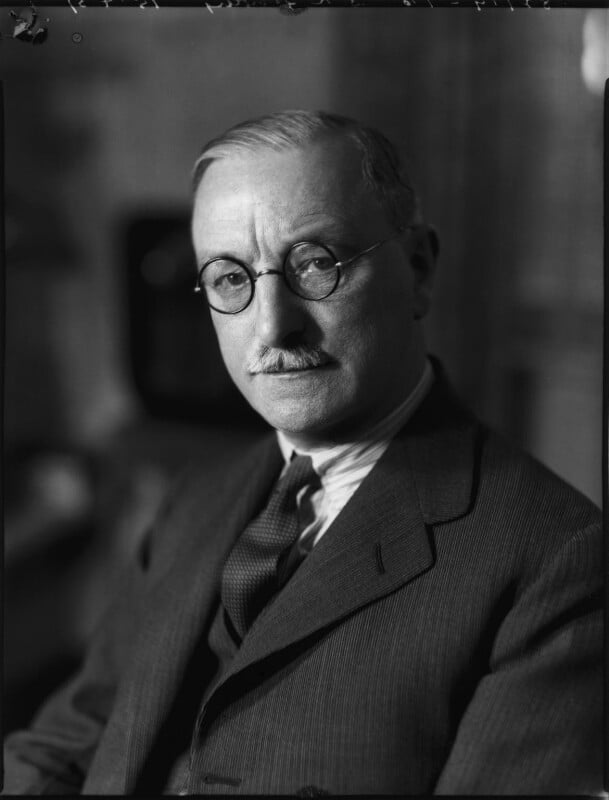
- Howley in 1937

Vice-Chairman of the Commission of Government
- In office February 26, 1936 – 1937
- Preceded by: Frederick C. Alderdice
- Succeeded by: John Puddester

Commissioner for Justice and Attorney General
- In office February 16, 1934 – 1937
- Preceded by: Office established
- Succeeded by: Lewis Edward Emerson

Member of the Newfoundland House of Assembly for Placentia-St. Mary's
- In office May 8, 1909 – October 30, 1913 Serving with Richard Devereaux and Frank Morris
- Preceded by: Edward Jackman; Michael S. Sullivan; James Davis
- Succeeded by: William J. Walsh

Member of the Newfoundland House of Assembly for St. George's
- In office November 8, 1900 – October 31, 1904
- Preceded by: Michael Gibbs
- Succeeded by: George T. Carty

Personal details
- Born: William Richard Howley; July 6, 1875 St. John's, Newfoundland Colony
- Died: April 18, 1941 (aged 65) St. John's, Newfoundland
- Party: Liberal (1900–1904); Conservative (1904); People's (1908–1913)
- Spouse: Mary Ryan (m. 1905)
- Children: 2
- Occupation: Lawyer

William Richard Howley, KC (July 6, 1875 – April 18, 1941) was a lawyer and politician in Newfoundland. He represented St. George's from 1900 to 1904 and Placentia and St. Mary's from 1909 to 1913 in the Newfoundland House of Assembly.

== Early life and legal career ==
Howley was born on July 6, 1875, in St. John's to geologist James Patrick Howley and Elizabeth Jane Firth. He was educated at St. Bonaventure's College, studied law with Robert Kent, and was called to the Newfoundland bar in 1898. He became the senior partner in Howley and Herder in 1909. Howley was named King's Counsel in 1911.

Howley married Mary Ryan in 1905 and the couple had two daughters. He died in St. John's at the age of 65.

== Politics ==
Elected as a Liberal in 1900, he joined the Conservatives after a dispute with Robert Bond. He was defeated when he ran for reelection as a Conservative in 1904. Howley ran unsuccessfully as a People's Party candidate in 1908 but was elected in 1909. He ran unsuccessfully for reelection in St. John's East in 1913. In 1928, he was named Minister of Justice in the Newfoundland cabinet but failed in his bid for election later that year. When responsible government was suspended in 1934, Howley served as Commissioner of Justice and Attorney General in the Commission of Government. From 1936 to 1938, he served as vice-chair of the commission. He was later named registrar for the Supreme Court.
