= William J. Walsh (politician) =

Newfoundland politician (1880–1948)

The Honourable William J. Walsh MHA

Minister of Agriculture and Mines
- In office 1932–1934
- Prime Minister: Frederick C. Alderdice
- Preceded by: Joseph Downey
- Succeeded by: John Hope Simpson (as Commissioner of Natural Resources)
- In office 1924–1928
- Prime Minister: Walter Monroe; Frederick C. Alderdice
- Preceded by: Alexander Campbell
- Succeeded by: Joseph Downey

Member of the Newfoundland House of Assembly for Placentia West
- In office June 11, 1932 – February 16, 1934
- Preceded by: Leo J. Murphy
- Succeeded by: Patrick Canning (post-Confederation)

Member of the Newfoundland House of Assembly for Placentia-St. Mary's
- In office October 30, 1913 – October 28, 1928 Serving with Richard Devereaux (1913–1919); Frank Morris (1913–1919); Edward Sinnott (1919–1928); Michael S. Sullivan (1919–1928)
- Preceded by: William R. Howley
- Succeeded by: Edward Emerson (as MHA for Placentia East)

Personal details
- Born: March 3, 1880 Argentia, Newfoundland Colony
- Died: October 18, 1948 (aged 68) St. John's, Newfoundland
- Party: People's (1913–1919); Liberal-Progressive (1919–1923); Liberal-Labour-Progressive (1923–1924); Liberal-Progressive Conservative (1924–1932); United Newfoundland (1932–1934)
- Occupation: Commercial traveller

William Joseph Walsh (March 3, 1880 – October 18, 1948) was a politician in Newfoundland. In the Newfoundland House of Assembly, he represented Placentia and St. Mary's from 1913 to 1928 as a member of the Newfoundland People's Party and Placentia West from 1932 to 1934 as a member of the United Newfoundland Party.

The son of Patrick Walsh, a miner, he was born in Argentia and was educated in Little Bay. He began work in the mines at Little Bay. When the mine was closed in 1900, Walsh became a commercial traveller. He later settled in Placentia. In 1916, he married Annie Kemp. Walsh served in the Newfoundland cabinet as Minister of Agriculture and Mines in 1919 and again in 1924. He held the same post from 1924 to 1928 but was not included in the cabinet until 1928. Walsh was defeated when he ran for election in Harbour Main in 1928 and then, in 1932, was elected in Placentia West. He served in the cabinet, again as Minister of Agriculture and Mines, from 1932 to 1934. From 1934 to 1941, he was manager in Newfoundland for Crown Life Insurance. In 1941, Walsh was named to a dispute board tasked with preventing labour interruptions during World War II. He died in St. John's at the age of 68.
