= Leo J. Murphy =

Newfoundland politician (1888–1959)

Leo Murphy MHA

Member of the Newfoundland House of Assembly for Placentia West
- In office 17 May 1930 – 11 June 1932
- Preceded by: Michael S. Sullivan
- Succeeded by: William J. Walsh

Personal details
- Born: Leo Joseph Murphy; December 10, 1888 Oderin, Newfoundland Colony
- Died: February 19, 1959 (aged 70) St. John's, Newfoundland, Canada
- Party: Liberal
- Spouse: Annie Power (m. 1912)
- Profession: Merchant

Leo Joseph Murphy (December 10, 1888 – February 19, 1959) was a merchant and politician in Newfoundland. He represented Placentia West in the Newfoundland House of Assembly from 1930 to 1932.

== Background ==
The son of Andrew Murphy, he was born in Oderin and left school in 1904 to work in the offshore bank fishery at Cape St. Mary's. He later went to St. John's where he began work in the grocery and wine business with Edward Sinnott. He later managed James Baird Limited's branch in Marystown. In 1912, he married Annie Power.

== Politics ==
Murphy was elected as a Liberal in a 1930 by-election but was defeated when he ran for re-election in St. John's West in 1932.

Murphy died in St. John's at the age of 70.
