= Edward Sinnott =

Newfoundland businessman and politician (1864–1936)

The Honourable Edward Sinnott MHA MLC
- Sinnott in 1927

Member of the Legislative Council of Newfoundland
- In office October 19, 1928 – February 16, 1934
- Nominated by: Richard Squires
- Appointed by: John Middleton

Member of the Newfoundland House of Assembly for Placentia and St. Mary's
- In office November 3, 1919 – October 29, 1928 Serving with Michael S. Sullivan and William J. Walsh
- Preceded by: Richard Devereaux; Frank Morris
- Succeeded by: Edward Emerson (as MHA for Placentia East)

Personal details
- Born: Edward Francis Sinnott; December 9, 1864 Placentia, Newfoundland Colony
- Died: October 26, 1936 (aged 71) St. John's, Newfoundland
- Party: Liberal-Progressive (1919–1923); Liberal-Labour-Progressive (1923–1924); Liberal-Conservative Progressive (1924–1928); Liberal (1928–1934)
- Spouse(s): Elizabeth Tobin (m. 1889) Laura Hartigan (m. 1923)
- Children: 6
- Education: Church of England Academy

Edward Francis Sinnott (1864–1936) was a merchant and politician in Newfoundland. He represented Placentia and St. Mary's in the Newfoundland House of Assembly from 1919 to 1928.

The son of John Sinnott, he was born in Placentia and was educated there and at St. Patrick's Hall in St. John's. He worked in the grocery, wine and spirits business in St. John's and then, in 1884, set up his own business selling wine and spirits. During World War I, when the sale of alcohol was prohibited, he went into the grocery business with a Mr. Clancy. He was also a director of the British Clothing Company. He was first elected to the Newfoundland assembly in 1919 and was re-elected two more times. From 1928 to 1934, Sinnott was a member of the Legislative Council of Newfoundland. He represented the Newfoundland assembly in the 1926 visit to Australia by the Empire parliamentary delegation.

Sinnott was married twice: first to Elizabeth Tobin in 1889 and then to Laura Hartigan in 1923. He was a member of the St. John's Benevolent Irish Society.

In 1877, Sinnott, never having built anything previously, constructed a whaleboat, the Placentia, for the Royal St. John's Regatta on Quidi Vidi Lake. With a crew of six fishermen from Placentia and Sinnott as coxswain, the Placentia took first place. The men had carried the boat on their shoulders along the 145 km (90 mile) trail from Placentia to St. John's, leaving on Saturday night and arriving on the Wednesday morning before the regatta. The crew, known as "The Seven Placentia Giants", was inducted into the Regatta's Hall of Fame in 1987.
