= Francis Morris (politician) =

Newfoundland lawyer and politician

The Honourable Francis Morris MBE KC
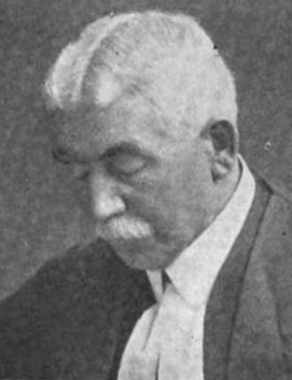
- Morris in 1922

18th Speaker of the Newfoundland House of Assembly
- In office 1905–1908
- Preceded by: Lawrence O'Brien Furlong
- Succeeded by: William Warren

Member of the Newfoundland House of Assembly for Placentia and St. Mary's
- In office May 8, 1909 – November 3, 1919 Serving with Richard Devereaux (1909–1919); William R. Howley (1909–1913); William J. Walsh (1913–1919)
- Preceded by: James Davis; Edward Jackman; Michael S. Sullivan
- Succeeded by: Edward Sinnott; Michael S. Sullivan

Member of the Newfoundland House of Assembly for Harbour Main
- In office November 8, 1900 – November 2, 1908 Serving with John J. St. John (1900–1904); John Lewis (1904–1908)
- Preceded by: William Woodford
- Succeeded by: John J. Murphy; William Woodford
- In office November 6, 1889 – October 28, 1897 Serving with William Woodford
- Preceded by: Richard MacDonnell; John Veitch
- Succeeded by: John J. St. John

Personal details
- Born: Francis Joseph Morris; December 5, 1862 St. John's, Newfoundland Colony
- Died: February 12, 1947 (aged 84) St. John's, Newfoundland
- Party: Liberal (1889–1907); People's (1907–1919)
- Spouse: Mary Feehan (m. 1892)
- Children: 1
- Relatives: Edward Morris (brother)
- Education: Saint Bonaventure's College
- Occupation: Jurist

Francis Joseph Morris MBE KC (December 5, 1862 – February 12, 1947) was a Newfoundland solicitor and politician.

== Biography ==
Francis J. Morris was born in St. John's, Newfoundland son of Catherine Fitzgerald and Edward Morris and brother of Edward P. Morris. Morris completed his schooling at Saint Bonaventure's College. Enrolled as a solicitor on November 29, 1886 he was called to the Bar of Newfoundland on November 21, 1887.

He married Mary Feehan in 1892 and they had one daughter.

Morris worked in the law firm Morris and Morris for many years and went on to become the solicitor for the St. John's Municipal Council, a position he held for 24 years. In 1902 he was named to the King's Counsel.

In the November 6, 1889 Newfoundland general election, Morris ran for the Liberal Party in the two-member district of Harbour Main. Morris had defeated the incumbent Maurice Fenelon convincingly. Morris also won his second term in office in the 1893 election running in the same district of Harbour Main. In 1904 Morris was appointed as Speaker of the House, a position he held for the next four years even while his brother broke with the Bond government, resigned from the Cabinet and crossed the floor to sit with the opposition. Morris kept in political life until 1917 when he resigned from the House of Assembly to accept the appointment as Judge of the Central District Court.

Morris was very influential in his many non political pursuits; he was a member of the Roman Catholic board of education for 28 years. During that time he was also a member of the board of governors for Saint Bonaventure's College. Morris was also an avid sports fan and was a member of the St. John's Regatta Committee for 38 years. He was also the first president of the Newfoundland Horseman's Association. He chaired the recruiting committee for the Newfoundland Regiment from 1915 to 1918 and was awarded the Order of the British Empire in 1919 for his efforts.

Morris was also the founding member of the Catholic Cadet Corps and of the Academia Institute, and a lifelong member of the Benevolent Irish Society.

== See also ==
- List of people of Newfoundland and Labrador
- List of communities in Newfoundland and Labrador
