= Lewis Edward Emerson =

Newfoundland politician and judge (1890–1949)

The Honourable Sir Lewis Edward Emerson KC
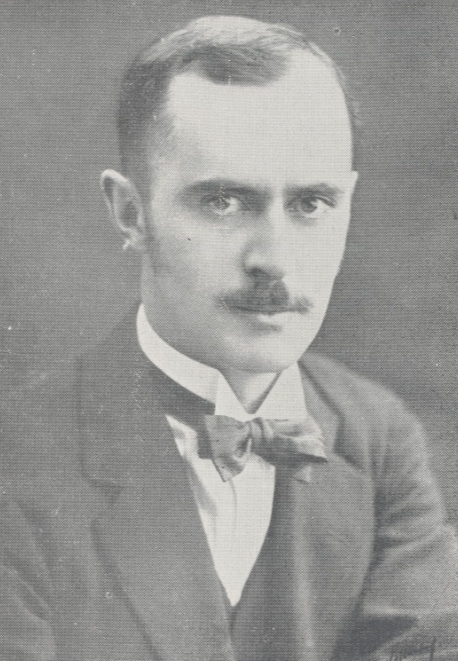
- Emerson in 1937

17th Chief Justice of Newfoundland
- In office 1944 – May 19, 1949
- Preceded by: William Horwood
- Succeeded by: Albert Walsh
Commission offices
Commissioner for Defence
In office 1940–1944
Preceded by	Office established
Succeeded by	Harry A. Winter
Commissioner for Justice and Attorney General
In office September 15, 1937 – 1940
Preceded by	William R. Howley
Succeeded by	Himself (as Commissioner for Defence)
Ministerial offices
Minister of Justice
In office 1932–1933
Prime Minister	Frederick C. Alderdice
Preceded by	Richard Squires
Succeeded by	William J. Browne
Minister without portfolio
In office May 1924 – June 2, 1924
Prime Minister	Albert Hickman
Legislative offices
Member of the Newfoundland House of Assembly for St. John's East
In office June 11, 1932 – February 6, 1934 Serving with Gerald G. Byrne
Preceded by	Frederick C. Alderdice
Succeeded by	John G. Higgins (post-Confederation); Frank Fogwill (post-Confederation)
Member of the Newfoundland House of Assembly for Placentia East
In office October 29, 1928 – June 11, 1932
Preceded by	Edward Sinnott; Michael S. Sullivan; William J. Walsh
Succeeded by	Philip J. Lewis (as MHA for Placentia-St. Mary's)

Personal details
- Born: Lewis Edward Emerson; May 12, 1890 St. John's, Newfoundland Colony
- Died: May 19, 1949 (aged 58) St. John's, Newfoundland, Canada
- Party: Liberal (1924–1928); Conservative (1928–1932); United Newfoundland (1932–1934)
- Spouse: Ruby Edith Ayre (m. 1920)
- Relations: George Henry Emerson (father); Prescott Emerson (great-uncle); George Henry Emerson Sr. (great-grandfather)
- Children: 1 daughter
- Education: Saint Bonaventure's College; Ampleforth College
- Occupation: Lawyer

Sir Lewis Edward Emerson (May 12, 1890 – May 19, 1949) was a lawyer, judge, and political figure in Newfoundland. He represented Placentia East from 1928 to 1932 and St. John's East from 1932 to 1934 in the Newfoundland House of Assembly.

Emerson was born in St. John's as the son of George Henry Emerson and Catherine Emerson (née Maher). He was educated at St. Patrick's Hall, at Saint Bonaventure's College and at Ampleforth College in England. Emerson was called to the bar in 1913 and practised in St. John's. He served in the dominion's cabinet as a minister without portfolio in 1924, as Minister of Justice from 1932 to 1934. In the Commission of Government he was Commissioner of Defence from 1940 to 1944 and Commissioner for Justice and Attorney General from 1937 to 1940. In 1944, he was knighted. He was Chief Justice of Newfoundland and Labrador from 1944 to 1949, thus being the first Chief Justice of the new province of Newfoundland and Labrador when the Dominion of Newfoundland joined Canada in 1949.

He died in St. John's in 1949.
