= Michael S. Sullivan =

Newfoundland politician (1876–1929)

The Honourable Lt Col. Michael S. Sullivan MHA
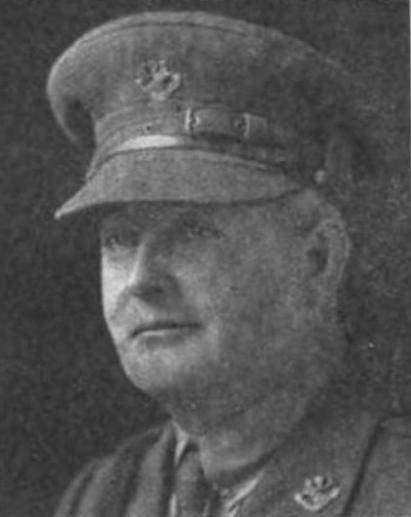
- Sullivan in 1922

Colonial Secretary
- In office August 1928 – November 1928
- Prime Minister: Frederick C. Alderdice
- Preceded by: John R. Bennett
- Succeeded by: Arthur Barnes

Minister without portfolio
- In office 1924–1928
- Prime Minister: Walter S. Monroe

Member of the Newfoundland House of Assembly for Placentia West Placentia and St. Mary's (1904–1909, 1919–1928)
- In office November 3, 1919 – May 22, 1929 Serving with Edward Sinnott and William J. Walsh (1919–1928)
- Preceded by: Richard Devereaux; Frank Morris
- Succeeded by: Leo J. Murphy
- In office October 31, 1904 – May 8, 1909 Serving with Thomas Bonia (1904–1908); Edward Jackman (1904–1909); James Davis (1908–1909)
- Preceded by: Richard T. McGrath
- Succeeded by: Richard Devereaux; William R. Howley; Frank Morris

Personal details
- Born: April 2, 1876 Presque, Newfoundland Colony
- Died: May 22, 1929 (aged 53) St. John's, Newfoundland
- Party: Liberal (1904–1913); Liberal-Progressive (1919–1923); Liberal-Labour-Progressive (1923–1924); Liberal-Conservative Progressive (1924–1929)
- Spouse: Kathleen Eleanor Thomson (m. 1903)
- Children: 2
- Education: Saint Bonaventure's College
- Occupation: Engineer, surveyor
- Military service
- Branch: Royal Newfoundland Regiment
- Service years: 1914–1919
- Rank: Lieutenant colonel

Michael S. Sullivan (April 2, 1876 – May 22, 1929) was a civil engineer, surveyor and politician in Newfoundland. He represented Placentia and St. Mary's from 1904 to 1909 as a Liberal and from 1919 to 1928 as a Liberal-Labour-Progressive and Placentia West from 1928 to 1929 as a Liberal-Conservative Progressive in the Newfoundland House of Assembly.

== Biography ==
The son of Patrick Sullivan and Selma Brown, he was born in Presque on April 2, 1876, and was educated at Saint Bonaventure's College. He married Kathleen Eleanor Thomson in 1903 and they had two children. He worked for the Reid Newfoundland Company until 1914 when he went into business on his own as a pulp wood agent. Sullivan was defeated by a People's Party candidate when he ran for reelection in 1909. He served as a lieutenant-colonel in the Newfoundland Forestry Battalion during World War I. He was re-elected in 1919 and served in the Newfoundland cabinet as a minister without portfolio from 1924 to 1928 and as Colonial Secretary in 1928. He also served as a Railway Commissioner. He died in office in St. John's on May 22, 1929.
