= Frank Fogwill =

Canadian politician (1902–1974)

Member of the Newfoundland House of Assembly for St. John's East
- In office May 27, 1949 – October 2, 1956 Serving with John G. Higgins
- Preceded by: Gerald G. Byrne (pre-Confederation); Edward Emerson (pre-Confederation)
- Succeeded by: James D. Higgins

Member of the Newfoundland National Convention for St. John's East Extern
- In office September 11, 1946 – January 30, 1948\

Personal details
- Born: Frank Desbarres Fogwill; November 2, 1902 St. John's, Newfoundland Colony
- Died: February 24, 1974 (aged 71) St. John's, Newfoundland, Canada
- Party: Progressive Conservative
- Other political affiliations: Responsible Government League
- Occupation: Electrician, labour advocate

Frank Desbarres Fogwill (November 21, 1902 – February 24, 1974) was an electrician, labour leader and politician in Newfoundland. He represented St. John's East in the Newfoundland House of Assembly from 1949 to 1956.

== Early life and labour advocacy ==
He was born in St. John's and was educated at Centenary Hall. Fogwill worked as an electrician in the Reid Newfoundland Company railway shop. He was a founding member of the St. John's local for the Brotherhood of Railway Carmen and served as its first president. He was a delegate to the convention which founded the Newfoundland Trades and Labour Council, later the Newfoundland and Labrador Federation of Labour, and served on its St. John's executive.

== Politics ==
Fogwill was elected to the Newfoundland National Convention in 1946 for St. John's East Extern. He supported the Responsible Government League and was opposed to confederation with Canada. Fogwill was elected to the Newfoundland assembly in 1949 and re-elected in 1951, retiring in 1956. He ran unsuccessfully for the riding of St. John's Centre in 1959. Fogwill died in St. John's in 1974.
