= Samuel Harris (Newfoundland merchant) =

Samuel Harris (July 2, 1850 – April 20, 1926) was a fishing captain and merchant in Newfoundland. Harris was a pioneer of the Newfoundland offshore Bank fishery.

The son of Thomas Harris and Eleanor Ann Foote, he was born in Grand Bank and first went to sea at the age of ten. By the time he was 22, Harris was captain of the Jennie S. Foote. By 1881, he owned his own vessels. He became partners with a brother-in-law in a retail outlet. In 1895, he set up his own exporting business, Samuel Harris Limited. Between 1881 and 1926, Harris owned more than 60 schooners. By 1915, his son George was handling the day-to-day operation of the business. A downturn in European markets following the end of World War I and a change in government regulations controlling the fishery resulted in the firm declaring bankruptcy in 1923. Harris became president of the restructured firm, now controlled by a consortium of its creditors. He also founded the Western Marine Insurance Company.

He served on the Board of Works for Grand Bank and contributed most of the funds for the construction of the town's first hospital.

Harris was married twice: first to Mary "Polly" Forsey in 1875 (she died in 1913) and then to Harriet Marion Harding in 1915. He died in Grand Bank at the age of 75.
