= Gerald G. Byrne =

Newfoundland politician (1890–1952)

Gerald Byrne MHA

Member of the Newfoundland House of Assembly for St. John's East St. John's City East (1928–1932)
- In office 29 October 1928 – 6 February 1934 Serving with Frederick C. Alderdice (1928–32); Lewis Edward Emerson (1932–34)
- Preceded by: William Higgins; Cyril Fox
- Succeeded by: John G. Higgins (post-Confederation); Frank Fogwill (post-Confederation)

Personal details
- Born: Gerald Guy Byrne; September 12, 1890 St. John's, Newfoundland Colony
- Died: January 25, 1952 (aged 61) St. John's, Newfoundland, Canada
- Party: Liberal-Conservative (1928–1932); United Newfoundland Party (1932–1934)
- Military service
- Branch: Royal Newfoundland Regiment
- Service years: 1915–1917
- Rank: Captain
- Conflicts: Beaumont-Hamel (1916)

Gerald Guy Byrne (September 12, 1890 – January 25, 1952) was a politician in Newfoundland. He represented St. John's City East in the Newfoundland House of Assembly from 1928 to 1934.

He was born in St. John's, Newfoundland and Labrador and was educated at Saint Bonaventure's College. He was one of the so-called "First Five Hundred" to enlist in the Royal Newfoundland Regiment at the start of World War I. Byrne saw action during the Gallipoli Campaign, was injured at Beaumont Hamel in 1916 and was sent back to Newfoundland in 1917. He became military secretary for the Department of Militia. He was elected to the Newfoundland assembly in 1928 and was reelected in 1932.

He died in St. John's at the age of 61.
