= John Gilbert Higgins =

Canadian politician (1891–1963)

The Honourable John G. Higgins KC
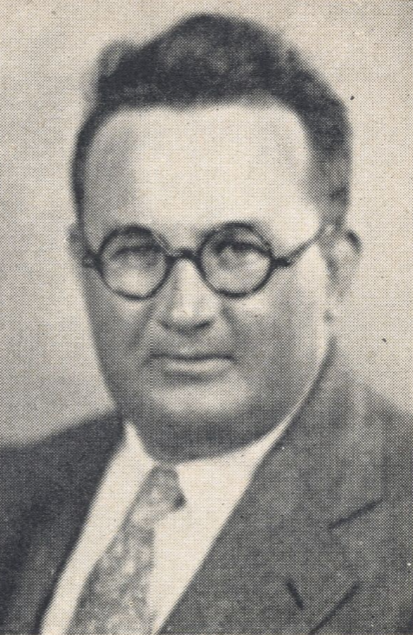
- Higgins in 1952

Senator for St. John's East, Newfoundland
- In office January 15, 1959 – July 1, 1963
- Nominated by: John Diefenbaker
- Appointed by: Vincent Massey

Leader of the Opposition in Newfoundland and Labrador
- In office November 8, 1949 – 1951
- Preceded by: Harry Mews
- Succeeded by: Peter Cashin

Member of the Newfoundland House of Assembly for St. John's East
- In office May 27, 1949 – November 26, 1951 Serving with Frank Fogwill
- Preceded by: Gerald G. Byrne (pre-Confederation); Edward Emerson (pre-Confederation)
- Succeeded by: James D. Higgins

Personal details
- Born: May 7, 1891 St. John's, Newfoundland Colony
- Died: July 1, 1963 (aged 72) St. John's, Newfoundland, Canada
- Party: Progressive Conservative
- Other political affiliations: Responsible Government League
- Spouse: Alice Casey (m. 1929)
- Children: 3
- Education: Saint Bonaventure's College; Merton College
- Occupation: Lawyer

Military service
- Allegiance: Canada
- Branch/service: Canadian Expeditionary Force
- Years of service: 1916-1918
- Battles/wars: First World War

John Gilbert Higgins KC (May 7, 1891 – July 1, 1963) was a Canadian lawyer and politician from Newfoundland.

== Early life ==
Higgins was born in St. John's, Newfoundland as the son of John J. Higgins and Hannah (née O'Grady) Higgins. He had an older sister, May. Following his father's death, Jack was educated from the age of five at Saint Bonaventure's College and was selected one of Newfoundland's Rhodes Scholars in 1909. He studied law at Merton College, Oxford, where his roommate was Robert Moses, and was captain of the Oxford-Canadian ice hockey team which toured Europe and was undefeated in its 17 matches, outscoring its opponents 204 goals to 17.

== Career ==
In 1913, he was called to the bar of Newfoundland and England and began practicing law in St. John's. In 1916, he joined the Canadian Corps's St. Francis Xavier Hospital Unit and served for the remainder of World War I in England and France. After the war, Higgins returned to Newfoundland and established a law partnership with Harry Winter in 1919.

=== Political ambitions ===
During the Newfoundland National Convention, Higgins opposed Joey Smallwood's resolution that Newfoundland join Canadian Confederation. He became a leading member of the Responsible Government League and campaigned against joining Canada in the 1948 Newfoundland referendums. When Newfoundland joined Canada on March 31, 1949, Higgins hung black crepe on his door as a symbol of mourning.

In Newfoundland's first provincial election on May 27, 1949, Higgins was elected to the Newfoundland House of Assembly as a Progressive Conservative from St. John's East. As party leader Harry Mews failed to win his seat, Higgins became the province's first Leader of the Opposition. Preferring his legal practice to politics, Higgins did not run for re-election in 1951.

On January 15, 1959, Prime Minister John Diefenbaker appointed Higgins as Newfoundland's first Progressive Conservative member of the Senate of Canada, where he served until his death in 1963.
