= Albert Walsh =

Canadian politician (1900–1958)

The Honourable Sir Albert Joseph Walsh

1st Lieutenant Governor of Newfoundland
- In office April 1, 1949 – September 15, 1949
- Monarch: George VI
- Governor General: The Viscount Alexander of Tunis
- Premier: Joey Smallwood
- Preceded by: Sir Gordon Macdonald (as Governor)
- Succeeded by: Sir Leonard Outerbridge

18th Chief Justice of Newfoundland
- In office September 15, 1949 – December 12, 1958
- Preceded by: Lewis Edward Emerson
- Succeeded by: Robert S. Furlong
Commission offices
Commissioner of Home Affairs and Education
In office September 5, 1944 – March 31, 1949
Preceded by	Harry A. Winter
Succeeded by	Position abolished
Commissioner of Defence
In office 1947 – March 31, 1949
Preceded by	Harry A. Winter (as Commissioner of Defence and Justice)
Succeeded by	Position abolished
Legislative offices
25th Speaker of the Newfoundland House of Assembly
In office 1928–1932
Preceded by	Cyril J. Fox
Succeeded by	James A. Winter
Member of the Newfoundland House of Assembly for Harbour Main
In office June 2, 1928 – June 11, 1932 Serving with Philip J. Lewis
Preceded by	William Woodford; Cyril J. Cahill
Succeeded by	Charles Furey; William J. Browne

Personal details
- Born: April 3, 1900 Holyrood, Newfoundland Colony
- Died: December 12, 1958 (aged 58) St. John's, Newfoundland, Canada
- Education: Dalhousie University
- Occupation: Lawyer, judge, teacher

Sir Albert Joseph Walsh (April 3, 1900 – December 12, 1958) was Commissioner of Home Affairs and Education and chief justice of the Dominion of Newfoundland, and its first lieutenant governor upon its admission to the Canadian Confederation on 1 April 1949.

== Early life and education ==
Walsh was born on April 3, 1900 in Holyrood, Newfoundland to William P. Walsh and Sophia Walsh (née Butler). After graduating from St. Bonaventure's College and Dalhousie University, he was the principal of the Roman Catholic Academy in Harbour Grace from 1917 to 1924. Walsh then studied law and was admitted to the bar in both Newfoundland and Nova Scotia.

== Political career ==
Walsh was a supporter for Sir Richard Squires and was elected MHA for the district of Harbour Main in 1928 and became Speaker of the House of Assembly. He lost his seat in the 1932 election and became district magistrate for five years for Grand Falls and then Corner Brook. In 1944, he was appointed to Newfoundland's Commission of Government as Commissioner of Home Affairs and Education and in 1947, he was given the portfolio of Justice of Defense.

Walsh had chaired the delegation for terms of union with Canada and upon Confederation coming into effect, he was appointed the first Lieutenant Governor of the Province of Newfoundland. He resigned that same year to become the Province's Chief Justice. He also sat on the United Nations panel for examination of international disputes.

Walsh was knighted in 1949.

== See also ==
- List of people of Newfoundland and Labrador
