= Spotted Island =

Island in Newfoundland and Labrador, Canada

Spotted Island Puktuksoak (Inuttitut)
- Location within Newfoundland and Labrador

Geography
- Coordinates: 53.51°N 55.78°W

Administration
- Canada
- Province: Newfoundland and Labrador

Spotted Island is an island off of the east coast of Labrador. Its south and east shores abut the Labrador Sea and a channel named Domino Run separates it from the Island of Ponds to the south. The island is approximately 4 miles long and 2 miles wide. Its name is due to the alternating black and white cliffs on its east coast.

In 1867 Spotted Island harbour was the scene of a dramatic rescue when William Jackman single-handedly saved 27 people from a ship which had run aground on a reef.

Until 1961 the island was home to a Pinetree Line early warning radar station.
