= Oderin Island (Newfoundland and Labrador) =

Human settlement in Newfoundland and Labrador, Canada

Coordinates: 47°18′00″N 54°48′00″W

Oderin Island

Oderin Island is an island in the Canadian province of Newfoundland and Labrador in western Placentia Bay, located about 30 km northeast of Marystown. Initially recorded as a fishing post of the French and later an outpost of the English, the island came to be inhabited at some time before 1704. The island no longer has any permanent residents due to a resettlement program in 1966.

== History ==
Oderin was originally settled by the French who considered it an important fishing post and had fortified it against the English. The name was originally Audierne, named after a town in France. In 1712, the French authorities in Placentia ordered all the buildings and fishing premises to be burned or destroyed, in part to deny to English the use of the site but also as retribution against the local French merchant Lafosse who had deserted to and collaborated with the English. This did not happen, however, as English Captain Tavener's second report indicates that Lafosse's abandoned wife was still present in May 1718 and running a prosperous operation.

After the Treaty of Utrecht, the English established an outpost on the island and this became an important trade and fishing center. Shipbuilding was also an important industry on the island even though there were no local sources of wood. Wood was cut on the Mainland portion of the Burin Peninsula in places like Rushoon, Bay D'Leau and Baine Harbour and brought to Oderin. In 1802 the population had reached 235 comprising mostly English settlers. The Poole merchant firm of Spurriers had operations there but went bankrupt in 1830. By 1836 the population had dropped to 133. Spurriers' business was eventually taken over by Furlong Bros., Irish merchants from New Brunswick. During this time period to the middle of the 19th century the island saw an influx of Irish Roman Catholics. Many of the original English settlers moved to their wintering areas on the Burin Peninsula and established permanent year round communities. As a result, the Irish became a majority of the population. In 1853 the first Roman Catholic Church was established at Spoon Cove on the Island. James Furlong sold his business interests and moved to St. John's, where he became a Member of the Legislative Council but died shortly after moving there.

Richard McGrath of Little Placentia who had been the Customs Officer in Lamanche Mines was elected Member of the Legislature for Placentia and St. Mary's in 1861 and appointed Justice of the Peace in 1865, relocated to Oderin. Oderin gained a Courthouse and became a point of entry of goods into the province. McGrath raised a large family there, many of whom went on to important positions in the government and clergy. Two sons, James and Richard went on to represent the district in the House of Assembly.

The post office was established in 1864. The first Waymaster in 1856 was James Murphy. The first Postmistress was Mary Maddocks in 1891.

In 1875 Fr. Michael Morris of St. John's arrived and built a brand new church and school in the centre of the community. His brother Edward Morris taught at the school and later became Prime Minister of Newfoundland.

Oderin's importance as a commercial center waned at the end of the 19th century and the community gradually declined in the 20th century. In 1898 it had a population of 395 and this had declined to 223 in 1956. It was abandoned under the Smallwood Government's controversial Resettlement Program in 1966. Residents relocated to nearby communities of Baine Harbour, Rushoon and Marystown. Today the island has no permanent population but still has many cabins that are used as summer vacation getaways by former residents.

== See also ==
- List of communities in Newfoundland and Labrador
