= Harry A. Winter =

Newfoundland politician (1889–1969)

The Honourable Harry A. Winter QC
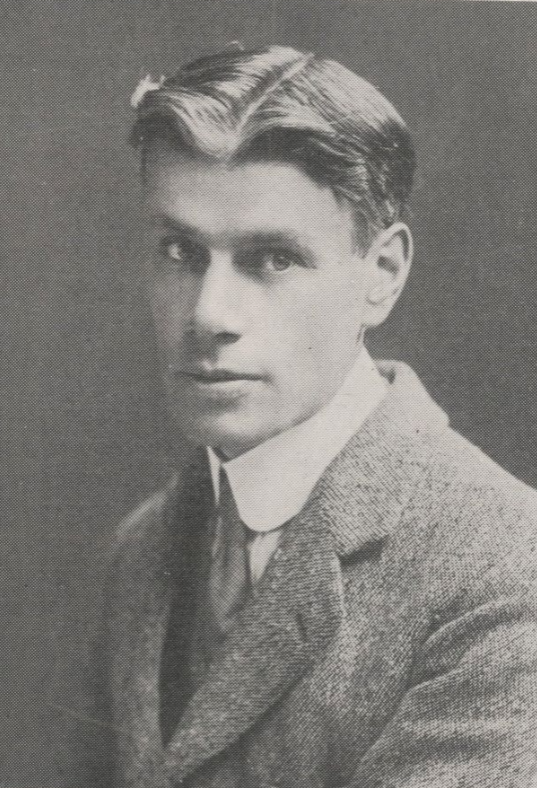
- Winter in 1930

Commissioner for Defence and Justice
- In office 1944–1947
- Preceded by: Lewis Edward Emerson (as Commissioner of Defence)
- Succeeded by: Albert Walsh (as Commissioner of Defence)

Commissioner for Home Affairs and Education
- In office 1941–1944
- Preceded by: James A. Winter
- Succeeded by: Albert Walsh

23rd Speaker of the Newfoundland House of Assembly
- In office 1923–1924
- Preceded by: William F. Penney
- Succeeded by: Cyril J. Fox

Member of the Newfoundland House of Assembly for Harbour Grace
- In office June 11, 1932 – February 16, 1934
- Preceded by: Frank C. Archibald
- Succeeded by: James Chalker (post-Confederation)

Member of the Newfoundland House of Assembly for Port de Grave
- In office May 3, 1923 – June 2, 1924
- Preceded by: John Crosbie
- Succeeded by: F. Gordon Bradley

Personal details
- Born: Henry Anderson Winter; February 3, 1889 St. John's, Newfoundland Colony
- Died: May 30, 1969 (aged 80) St. John's, Newfoundland, Canada
- Party: Liberal Reform (1923–1924); Conservative (1928–1932); United Newfoundland (1932–1934)
- Spouse: Frances Goodridge (m. 1916)
- Children: 2 daughters
- Relatives: James S. Winter (father); James A. Winter (brother); Augustus F. Goodridge (uncle-in-law)
- Education: Oxford University
- Occupation: Lawyer, journalist

Harry Anderson Winter QC (February 3, 1889 – May 30, 1969) was a lawyer, journalist, judge and political figure in Newfoundland and Labrador. He represented Port de Grave from 1923 to 1924 and Harbour Grace from 1932 to 1934 in the Newfoundland and Labrador House of Assembly.

Winter was born in St. John's as the son of James Spearman Winter and Emily Julia Coen. He was educated at Bishop Feild College and at Oxford University. Winter was called to the bar in 1911. In 1916, he became editor of the Evening Telegram. Winter was speaker for the Newfoundland assembly from 1923 to 1924. He left politics in 1924 and then ran unsuccessfully for a seat in the Newfoundland assembly in 1928. Also in 1928, he was named King's Counsel. He served in the Executive Council as a minister without portfolio from 1932 to 1934. Winter served in the Commission of Government as Commissioner for Home Affairs and Education from 1941 to 1944 and Commissioner for Justice and Defence from 1944 to 1947. He was a justice in the Supreme Court of Newfoundland and Labrador from 1947 to 1964.

In 1916, Winter married Frances Goodridge. He died in St. John's at the age of 72.

His brother James also served as speaker for the Newfoundland assembly.
