= Russian ship Dmitry =

Cargo ship wrecked at England in 1885

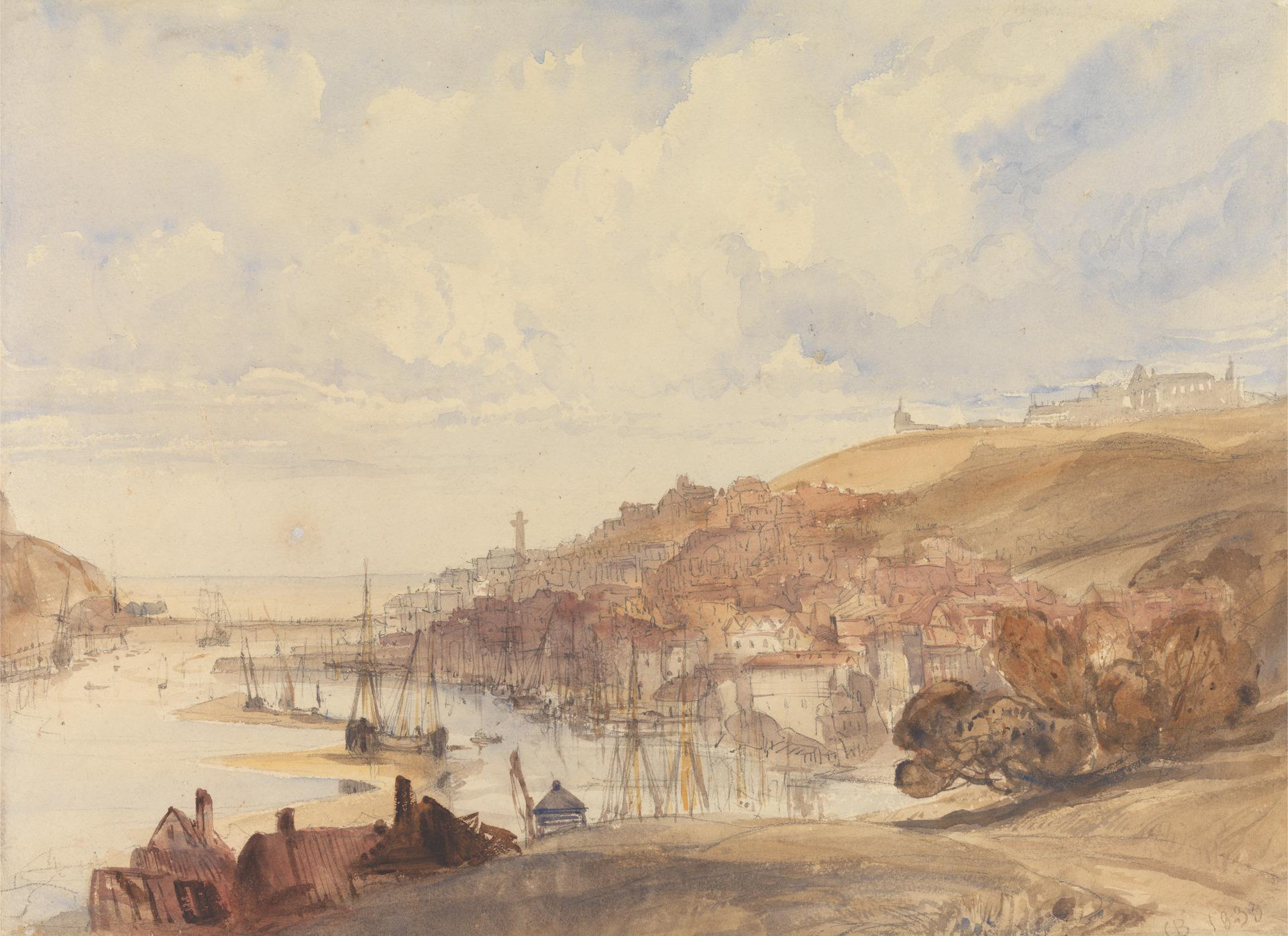
Dmitry was wrecked entering Whitby Harbour (pictured)

Dmitry (Russian: Дмитрий) was a Russian cargo ship that was wrecked at Whitby, England, in 1885. The vessel had been travelling from Antwerp, Belgium, to Newcastle upon Tyne, England, when she sought safe harbour in Whitby during a gale on 24 October. She escaped rocks outside the harbour but drifted onto a sand bar and was wrecked there the following day. The wreck came to the attention of author Bram Stoker during a visit to the town in 1890 and served as the inspiration for the Demeter in his gothic horror novel Dracula.

== Ship ==
The Dmitry was a wooden, schooner-rigged cargo vessel of 120 register tons. By 1885 she was operating out of Narva in the Saint Petersburg Governorate of the Russian Empire.

On 24 October 1885 she was travelling from Antwerp, Belgium, to Newcastle upon Tyne, England, with a ballast load of silver sand. She was likely headed to collect a cargo of coal. She encountered a gale en-route and made for the safety of the harbour at Whitby. The storm wrecked the vessel Mary and Agnes which was also attempting to reach the town. Dmitry was sighted from the shore in the afternoon while a few miles off Whitby and seen to be flying distress signals. The town's lifeboat, Harriott Forteath, was launched to provide assistance and two harbour pilots stood by. Thousands of residents took to the harbour to watch events.

Dmitry was in danger of being driven onto rocks by the wind but her master, named Sikki, demonstrated excellent seamanship and navigated her along a safe route known as the sledway. The Dmitry made it through the harbour entrance to be greeted with loud cheers from the crowd. One of the harbour pilots attempted to pass instructions to Sikki but was unsuccessful and he failed to appreciate the danger of dropping sail in the harbour. The Dmitry drifted towards the sands at Collier's Hope (also known as Tate Hill Sands), at the eastern end of the harbour between the Tate Hill Pier and East Pier. An attempt to halt her by dropping anchor failed and she was stranded.

The seven-man crew failed to relaunch Dmitry and she was left on the sands overnight, with the hope that she would refloat on the next high tide. This was unsuccessful and, although the wind was low and sea calm, she was damaged by the sea on 25 October. After her masts fell overboard and she began to break up she was abandoned. The vessel was photographed in this state by local artist Francis Meadow Sutcliffe. The Dmitry was not insured and was sold for breaking up as a wreck.

== Influence on Dracula ==
The Dmitry was the inspiration for the Demeter, the vessel by which the vampiric title character arrives in England in Bram Stoker's 1897 novel Dracula. Stoker spent a month holidaying at Whitby with his wife Florence and son Noel in August 1890. He is known to have discussed the wreck of the Dmitry with the local detachment of HM Coastguard. In the published version of Dracula, Stoker describes the wreck as arising from a wind that "rushed at headlong speed, swept the strange schooner before the blast, with all sail set, and gained the safety of the harbour". Rescuers from Whitby see the ship manned only by a corpse at the helm and Dracula, in the form of a dog, escaping the scene. An account in Stoker's notebooks dated 15 October 1890 describes a dog jumping off a ship at Whitby and running into a churchyard, where graves were dug up and a local dog killed. It is not clear if this account is of events connected to the Dmitry or another vessel arriving at Whitby, or a work of fiction. In the novel the Demeter is described as arriving from Varna, a town in Bulgaria, which is an anagram of Dmitry's home port of Narva. Like the Dmitry she carried only a ballast cargo of silver sand, besides Dracula and his coffins.
