= George Penny =

Canadian politician

The Right Honourable Frederick George Penny, 1st Viscount Marchwood KCVO, JP

Member of Parliament for Kingston-upon-Thames
- In office 1922–1937

Personal details
- Born: 10 March 1876 Southampton, England
- Died: 1 January 1955
- Party: Conservative Party
- Education: King Edward VI Grammar School, Southampton
- Occupation: Businessman, Politician

George Joseph Penny (October 24, 1897 – December 4, 1949) was one of Newfoundland's first three members of the Senate of Canada who were appointed on August 17, 1949, shortly after the province joined the Canadian Confederation.

He was the operator of a frozen fish plant business in the southwest of Newfoundland and had been an active member of the Newfoundland Confederate Association which had campaigned for the former colony to join Canada. Penny sat in the upper house as a Liberal. He died at the age of 52 after a bout of bronchial pneumonia.
