= List of shipwrecks in April 1885 =

The list of shipwrecks in April 1885 includes ships sunk, foundered, grounded, or otherwise lost during April 1885.

== 1 April ==
List of shipwrecks: 1 April 1885
Ship	State	Description
Clurnium	United Kingdom	The steamship ran aground at Blankenese, Germany. She was on a voyage from Baltimore, Maryland, United States to Hamburg, Germany.
Duna	United Kingdom	The steamship was driven ashore at Thornham, Norfolk.

== 2 April ==
List of shipwrecks: 2 April 1885
Ship	State	Description
Driving Mist	United Kingdom	The schooner was driven ashore at Padstow, Cornwall. She was on a voyage from Newport, Monmouthshire to Padstow. She was refloated with the assistance of a tug and taken in to Padstow in a leaky condition.
John Wesley	United Kingdom	The ketch struck rocks and was wrecked in St Brelade's Bay, Jersey, Channel Islands. Her crew survived. She was on a voyage from Plymouth, Devon to Jersey and Guernsey, Channel Islands. John Wesley floated off and drifted out to sea. She was discovered 10 nautical miles (19 km) south west of La Corbière, Jersey by the tug Wonder ( (United Kingdom of Great Britain and Ireland) Jersey) and was towed in to Saint Helier, Jersey in a waterlogged condition.
Queen Victoria	United Kingdom	The barque was driven ashore and severely damaged at Dungeness, Kent. She was on a voyage from Savannah, Georgia, United States to Hamburg, Germany.

== 3 April ==
List of shipwrecks: 3 April 1885
Ship	State	Description
Alma	United Kingdom	The dandy ran aground on the Danger Rock, off Glandore, County Cork. She floated off and sank the next day.
Guido	United Kingdom	The barque ran aground on the Sovereign Shoal, in the English Channel off the coast of Sussex, United Kingdom. She was on a voyage from Newcastle upon Tyne, Northumberland, United Kingdom to La Spezia. She was refloated and taken in to Portsmouth, Hampshire, United Kingdom in a leaky condition.

== 4 April ==
List of shipwrecks: 4 April 1885
Ship	State	Description
Mariupol	Russia	The steamship foundered in the Sea of Azov with the loss of all but one of the 30 people on board.

== 5 April ==
List of shipwrecks: 5 April 1885
Ship	State	Description
Maria Louisa	Germany	The ship was driven ashore and wrecked 6 nautical miles (11 km) east of Dunbar, Lothian, United Kingdom. Her crew were rescued by rocket apparatus. She was on a voyage from Bremerhaven to East Wemyss, Fife, United Kingdom.
Ranger	United Kingdom	The fishing smack foundered off the Sheringham Shoal, in the North Sea off the north Norfolk coast. Her crew survived.

== 6 April ==
List of shipwrecks: 6 April 1885
Ship	State	Description
Ayrshire	United Kingdom	The steamship was wrecked in Cloughy Bay with the loss of a crew member. She was on a voyage from Bilbao, Spain to Glasgow, Renfrewshire.
England	United Kingdom	The steamship was driven ashore at Sulina, Romania.
Glenlui	United Kingdom	The ship was driven ashore at False Point, India.
Quintus	Netherlands	The schooner ran aground on the Anholt Reef, in the Baltic Sea.
Herrington	United Kingdom	The barque was abandoned off "Cape Sacraty". Her crew were rescued by the steamship Kingsdale (United Kingdom). Herrington was on a voyage from Sunderland, County Durham to "Sabinella".
Robert Anderson	United Kingdom	The ship was driven ashore at Methil, Fife. Her crew were rescued.
Unnamed	Flag unknown	The schooner was driven ashore at Margate, Kent, United Kingdom. Her crew were rescued by a tug.

== 7 April ==
List of shipwrecks: 7 April 1885
Ship	State	Description
Apollo	Flag unknown	The ship was driven ashore at False Point, India. She was on a voyage from Batavia, Netherlands East Indies to Diamond Island, Burma.
Prince Consort, and Waterford	United Kingdom	Prince Consort collided with the schooner Waterford in the Lynn Deeps. Both vessels were severely damaged. Waterford was taken in to King's Lynn, Norfolk for repairs.

== 8 April ==
List of shipwrecks: 8 April 1885
Ship	State	Description
Agatha	Norway	The barque ran aground on the Gunfleet Sand, in the North Sea off the coast of Essex, United Kingdom. She was on a voyage from Kristiansand to Bristol, Gloucestershire, United Kingdom.
Etna	Russia	The derelict barque drove ashore at Sheringham, Norfolk, United Kingdom.

== 9 April ==
List of shipwrecks: 9 April 1885
Ship	State	Description
Emanuel	United Kingdom	The brig was driven ashore on the Greenhill Rocks, on the coast of Northumberland. Her crew were rescued by rocket apparatus.
Mountaineer	United Kingdom	The ship departed from Port Natal, Natal Colony for Calcutta, India. No further trace, reported overdue.

== 12 April ==
List of shipwrecks: 12 April 1885
Ship	State	Description
Mabel	United Kingdom	The schooner was run into by Warsash (United Kingdom) and sank at Liverpool, Lancashire.
Tregenna	United Kingdom	The steamship collided with the steamship Comeragh (United Kingdom) and ran aground in the River Avon. Tregenna was on a voyage from Nicholaieff, Russia to Bristol, Gloucestershire. She was refloated and completed her voyage.

== 14 April ==
List of shipwrecks: 14 April 1885
Ship	State	Description
Kalaja	(Russian Empire) Grand Duchy of Finland	The barque was run into by the steamship Main (Germany) and sank in the Atlantic Ocean 450 nautical miles (830 km) south west of Halifax, Nova Scotia, Canada (40°54′N 54°39′W) with the loss of a crew member. Survivors were rescued by Main. Kalaja was on a voyage from the Black River, Jamaica to Havre de Grâce, Seine-Inférieure, France.
Rainbow	United States	The whaler, a barque, was crushed by ice and sank in the Bering Sea off Cape Navarin, Russia (62.2778°N 179.0961°E).

== 15 April ==
List of shipwrecks: 15 April 1885
Ship	State	Description
J. R. Jolley	United States	The steamship sank while tied up to the bank in Big Bayou Jessie. Two of her crew were killed.

== 17 April ==
List of shipwrecks: 17 April 1885
Ship	State	Description
Cohanim	United Kingdom	The steamship departed from Norfolk, Virginia, United States for Hamburg, Germany. No further trace, presumed foundered with the loss of all 24 rew.
Cyprus	Canada	The full-rigged ship was abandoned in the Atlantic Ocean. Her crew were rescued by the barque Ortelius (Netherlands). Cyprus was on a voyage from Calcutta, India to New York, United States.
Ransome	United Kingdom	The steamship struck the Low Lee Rocks, off Mousehole, Cornwall. She made for Penzance, Cornwall but sank at the harbour mouth. She was on a voyage from Porthcawl, Glamorgan to Penzance. Within six days bad weather had destroyed the wreck.
Vivid	United Kingdom	The sealer, a schooner, was crushed by ice and sank 15 nautical miles (28 km) off Twillingate, Newfoundland Colony.

== 18 April ==
List of shipwrecks: 18 April 1885
Ship	State	Description
Earl of Windsor	United Kingdom	The tug was driven ashore and wrecked 1 1/2 nautical miles (2.8 km) south of Cresswell, Northumberland. Her crew were rescued.

== 19 April ==
List of shipwrecks: 19 April 1885
Ship	State	Description
Young Prince	(Dominion of Newfoundland) Newfoundland Colony	The sealer was sunk by an iceberg. Her crew of 32 men were on an ice floe for 19 days until they were rescued by a French brig.

== 20 April ==
List of shipwrecks: 20 April 1885
Ship	State	Description
C. M. Reynolds	United Kingdom	The ship was driven ashore at St. Helen's, Cumberland and was abandoned by her crew. She was on a voyage from Belfast, County Durham to Maryport, Cumberland.
George	United Kingdom	The ship was driven ashore at St. Helen's and was abandoned by her crew. She was on a voyage from Dublin to Maryport.
Hans Gude	Norway	The full-rigged ship collided with the steamship Merchant Prince (United Kingdom) and sank off Tarifa, Spain with the loss of eight of her crew. Survivors were rescued by Merchant Prince. Hans Gude was on a voyage from Marseille, Bouches-du-Rhône, France to St. Ubes, Portugal. She was subsequently discovered capsized off Cape Trafalgar, Spain by HMS Superb (Royal Navy). She was towed in to Gibraltar Bay by a tug.

== 21 April ==
List of shipwrecks: 21 April 1885
Ship	State	Description
Joseph Budman	(Canada)	The ship caught fire at Cardiff, Glamorgan, United Kingdom.
Zacharias	Norway	The ship departed from Wilmington, North Carolina, United States for Hull, Yorkshire, United Kingdom. No further trace, reported missing.

== 22 April ==
List of shipwrecks: 22 April 1885
Ship	State	Description
Eliza	France	The ship departed from Perros-Guirec, Côtes-du-Nord for Bristol, Gloucestershire, United Kingdom. No further trace, reported missing.
Firefly	United Kingdom	The steam launch foundered off Lowestoft, Suffolk with the loss of all but two of her crew. She was refloated on 8 May and towed in to Lowestoft.

== 23 April ==
List of shipwrecks: 23 April 1885
Ship	State	Description
Charles George	United Kingdom	The brigantine collided with the steamship Cathay (United Kingdom) and sank in the English Channel off Beachy Head, Sussex with the loss of four or five of the seven people on board. The survivors were rescued by Cathay. Charles George was on a voyage from Cowes, Isle of Wight to Seaham, County Durham.

== 24 April ==
List of shipwrecks: 24 April 1885
Ship	State	Description
Ambrose Light	United States of Colombia	Colombian Civil War: The ship was captured at Cartagena by USS Alliance (United States Navy) being suspected of being a pirate vessel. Her letter of marque was ignored.
Betsey	United Kingdom	The smack foundered off the Point of Ayre, Isle of Man. Both crew were rescued by the steamship Cargan (United Kingdom). Betsey was on a voyage from Workington, Cumberland to Kirkcubbin, County Down.
Corsair	United Kingdom	The schooner was driven ashore at Courtown, County Wexford. Her five crew were rescued by rocket apparatus.
St. Halvard	Norway	The barque was driven ashore and severely damaged at Ballyquinton Point, County Down, United Kingdom. She was on a voyage from Barrow-in-Furness, Lancashire to Tønsberg.

== 26 April ==
List of shipwrecks: 26 April 1885
Ship	State	Description
Maid of the Mill	United Kingdom	The Thames barge was driven ashore between Southend-on-Sea and Shoeburyness, Essex.
Secret	United Kingdom	The Thames barge was driven ashore and severely damaged between Southend and Shoeburyness.
William and Harriet	United Kingdom	The Thames barge was driven ashore between Southend and Shoeburyness.

== 28 April ==
List of shipwrecks: 28 April 1885
Ship	State	Description
Queen	United Kingdom	The steamship ran aground on the Kinburn Spit, off the mouth of the Bug. She was on a voyage from Odesa to Nicholaieff, Russia. She was refloated the next day with assistance from the steamship Raglan (United Kingdom).

== 29 April ==
List of shipwrecks: 29 April 1885
Ship	State	Description
Ythan	United Kingdom	The schooner was run down and sunk 12 nautical miles (22 km) off the mouth of the Humber by the steamship Frances (Norway). Her crew were rescued by Frances. Ythan was on a voyage from Hartlepool, County Durham to Folkestone, Kent.

== Unknown date ==
List of shipwrecks: Unknown date in April 1885
Ship	State	Description
America	Portugal	The brigantine was driven ashore and wrecked on the Ilha de Itamaracá, Brazil. She was on a voyage from Porto to Pernambuco, Brazil.
Ann Armytage	United Kingdom	The barque was abandoned at sea before 30 April. Her crew were rescued by the chasse-marée Martignan ( (France) Mauritius).
Ashington	United Kingdom	The steamship ran aground in the Suez Canal. She was refloated.
Ateth	France	The brig was driven ashore and wrecked at Saint-Pierre, Saint Pierre and Miquelon. All on board were rescued.
Calderbank	United Kingdom	The brig was abandoned at sea. Her crew were rescued.
Caledonia	United Kingdom	The ship was wrecked at Bimini, Bahamas. She was on a voyage from New Orleans, Louisiana, United States to Havre de Grâce, Seine-Inférieure, France.
Cannamore	United Kingdom	The ship was driven ashore 40 nautical miles (74 km) south of False Point, India. She was on a voyage from Shanghai, China to Calcutta, India. She subsequently became a wreck.
C. H. Williams	United States	The ship collided with a coaster and ran aground in the Schuylkill River. She was on a voyage from Philadelphia, Pennsylvania to Havana, Cuba.
Clementine	Germany	The brigantine was driven ashore and wrecked at Galveston, Texas, United States. She was on a voyage from Rio de Janeiro, Brazil to Galveston.
Credo	Norway	The barque struck a sunken rock at Dingwall, Ross-shire, United Kingdom and became severely leaky. She was on a voyage from Lyngør to Dingwall.
Dalriada	United Kingdom	The steamship was driven ashore at Drogheda, County Louth. She was refloated and resumed her voyage.
Flora	Canada	The brigantine was driven ashore and wrecked on Brava Island, Cape Verde Islands. Her crew were rescued. She was on a voyage from Boston, Massachusetts, United States to Brava Island.
Frances	United States	The schooner was lost at Minatitlán, Mexico.
Frigga	Norway	The brig ran aground on the Middelgrund, in the Baltic Sea. She was on a voyage from Sunderland, County Durham, United Kingdom to Carlskrona, Sweden.
Glendower	United Kingdom	The ship was driven ashore on D Reef, off Cooktown, Queensland.
Hugh Bourne	United Kingdom	The ship was driven ashore and wrecked at "Montril".
Kalmia	United Kingdom	The ship was driven ashore and wrecked 35 nautical miles (65 km) south west of Pooree, India. Her crew were rescued. She was on a voyage from Liverpool, Lancashire to Calcutta.
Kong Oscar	Norway	The barque was wrecked on Anegada, Bahamas. Her crew were rescued. She was on a voyage from Cardiff, Glamorgan, United Kingdom to Saint Thomas, Virgin Islands.
Lady Alice Kenlis	United Kingdom	The steamship was driven ashore at St. Bees, Cumberland.
Lizzie Trembeth	United Kingdom	The ship was driven ashore on the coast of Cornwall. She was later refloated and taken in to Par, Cornwall in a severely damaged condition.
Longdale	United Kingdom	The ship ran aground on the Middelgrund.
Persian Monarch	United Kingdom	The ship ran aground in the Suez Canal. She was later refloated and resumed her voyage.
Plejaden	Germany	The barque was wrecked in the Chatham Islands. She was on a voyage from Levuka, Fiji Islands to Falmouth, Cornwall, United Kingdom.
Psyche	United Kingdom	The ship struck a sunken rock and foundered. Her crew were rescued.
Rokeby	United Kingdom	The steamship was driven ashore at Diana Point, Ottoman Empire. She was on a voyage from Taganrog, Russia to Amsterdam, North Holland, Netherlands.
Ruth	Norway	The abandoned ship was discovered off Stavanger and was towed in by a steamship.
Sagunta	Spain	The brigantine was driven ashore and wrecked at Las Palmas, Canary Islands. Her crew were rescued.
Shannon	United Kingdom	The full-rigged ship was sighted whilst on a voyage from London to Calcutta. No further trace, presumed foundered with the loss of all 29 people on board.
Zafiro	United Kingdom	The steamship was driven ashore on "Rees Island", Burma.
Zvonimir	Austria-Hungary	The barque ran aground at Porto, She was on a voyage from New York, United States to Porto.
No. 46	French Navy	The No. 24-class torpedo boat foundered while under tow.
