= James A. Winter =

Newfoundland politician

The Honourable James A. Winter QC
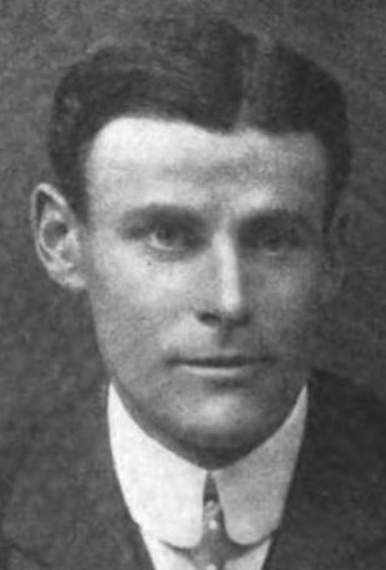
- Winter in 1922

Commissioner for Home Affairs and Education
- In office April 20, 1936 – May 20, 1941
- Preceded by: Frederick C. Alderdice
- Succeeded by: Harry A. Winter

26th Speaker of the Newfoundland House of Assembly
- In office 1933 – February 16, 1934
- Preceded by: Albert Walsh
- Succeeded by: Reginald F. Sparkes (post-Confederation)

Member of the Newfoundland House of Assembly for Burgeo and La Poile
- In office June 11, 1932 – February 16, 1934
- Preceded by: Arthur Barnes
- Succeeded by: Herman Quinton (post-Confederation)

Member of the Newfoundland House of Assembly for Burin East
- In office October 29, 1928 – June 11, 1932
- Preceded by: J. J. Long (as MHA for Burin)
- Succeeded by: Samuel J. Foote (as MHA for Burin)

Personal details
- Born: James Alexander Winter; December 20, 1886 St. John's, Newfoundland
- Died: June 29, 1971 (aged 84) St. John's, Newfoundland, Canada
- Party: Liberal-Conservative Progressive (1928–1932); United Newfoundland (1932–1934)
- Spouse: Mary Evangeline Arnaud (m. 1915)
- Children: 4
- Relatives: James S. Winter (father); Harry A. Winter (brother)
- Education: Bishop Feild College; Rossall School
- Occupation: Lawyer

James Alexander Winter QC (December 20, 1886 – June 29, 1971) was a lawyer and political figure in Newfoundland and Labrador. He represented Burin East from 1928 to 1932 and Burgeo from 1932 to 1934 in the Newfoundland and Labrador House of Assembly as a member of the United Newfoundland Party. He was the final Speaker of the House of Assembly of Newfoundland and Labrador before the suspension of responsible government and confederation with Canada.

== Biography ==
The son of James Spearman Winter, he was born in St. John's and was educated at Bishop Feild College and Rossall School in England. Winter was called to the bar in 1910 and practised in St. John's. In 1933, he was named King's Counsel. Winter was speaker for the Newfoundland assembly from 1932 to 1934. He served in the Commission of Government as Commissioner of Home Affairs and Education from 1936 to 1941. In 1941, he was named registrar and chief clerk for the Supreme Court of Newfoundland and Labrador.

In 1915, he married Mary Evangeline Arnaud; the couple had four children. Winter died in St. John's in 1971.

His brother Harry also served as speaker for the assembly.
