= Island of Ponds =

Island in Labrador

- Location within Newfoundland and Labrador

Geography
- Coordinates: 53.46°N 55.89°W

Administration
- Canada
- Province: Newfoundland and Labrador

Demographics
- Population: 87 (approximate) (2021)
- Ethnic groups: Inuit-Métis

Island of Ponds is an island off of the east coast of Labrador. The Labrador mainland lies to its south and a channel called Domino Run separates it from Spotted Island to the north. The only remaining settlement on the island is Black Tickle. It is connected to the mainland by a seasonal coastal ferry service.

Island of Ponds consists mainly of igneous rock with a shallow cover of sediment, insufficient to support trees. The island is named for its 366 shallow ponds. Despite the many ponds, access to safe drinking water has been a long-standing problem for residents of the island.
