= William Jackman =

Newfoundland sealing captain (1837–1877)

Captain William Jackman
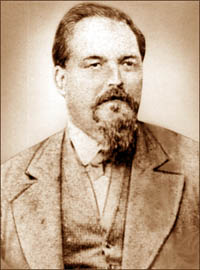

Personal details
- Born: May 20, 1837 Renews, Newfoundland Colony
- Died: February 25, 1877 (aged 39) St. John's, Newfoundland Colony
- Spouse: Bridget Burbage
- Children: 4
- Relatives: Arthur Jackman (brother); Edward Michael Jackman (nephew)
- Occupation: Sealing captain

William Jackman (May 20, 1837 – February 25, 1877) was a Newfoundland sealing captain and sailing master.

Jackman was born in Renews, Newfoundland. Like his younger brother Arthur, Jackman commanded sealing vessels for Bowring Brothers. Jackman is best known for the rescue at Spotted Island off the coast of Labrador on 9 October 1867. Jackman witnessed the Sea Slipper (Note: Some sources call the ship Sea Clipper, others Sea Slipper; the latter is used in newspaper accounts of the time; the former by the Canadian Dictionary of National Biography.) run aground with 27 people aboard. Jackman swam back and forth to the vessel eleven times, rescuing eleven people. His crew then tied a rope around his waist and Jackman swam back sixteen more times, rescuing all aboard the doomed ship. On 18 December 1868, for his heroism, he was presented the medal and diploma of the Royal Humane Society. Captain William Jackman Hospital in Labrador City is named for him.
