= Arthur Jackman =

Arthur Jackman (1843 – 31 January 1907) was a Newfoundland sealing captain.

Born in Renews, Newfoundland, Jackman was the son of Captain Thomas Jackman and the brother of William Jackman. In 1880 he was commander of the Narwhal and between 1881 and 1886 the Resolute, both of which sailed from Dundee. Jackman's ships engaged in both whaling and sealing off of Newfoundland. Jackman eventually became superintendent of the Bowring Brothers fleet.
