= Black Tickle =

Black Tickle-Domino
- Local service district / designated place
- Location of Black Tickle-Domino Black Tickle-Domino (Canada)
- Coordinates: 53.464°N 55.78°W
- Country: Canada
- Province: Newfoundland and Labrador
- Region: Labrador
- Census division: 10
- Census subdivision: B

Government
  - Type: Unincorporated

Area
  - Land: 9.43 km^{2} (3.64 sq mi)

Population (2021)
  - Total: 87
- Time zone: UTC−04:00 (AST)
  - Summer (DST): UTC−03:00 (ADT)
- Area code: 709

Black Tickle (Inuttitut: Kikkertet) is a settlement and designated place in Newfoundland and Labrador, located on the Island of Ponds and part of the unrecognized NunatuKavut territory. In the 2021 census Black Tickle had a population of 87. Locations in Labrador south of Black Tickle generally observe Newfoundland Time instead of Atlantic Standard Time, which is observed by the rest of the province's continental communities. Black Tickle is inaccessible by road and is served by Black Tickle Airport, a gravel strip airport (CCE4).

The Goose Bay - Cartwright - Black Tickle ferry service, MV Kamutik W., runs from June to November.

== History ==
In 2012, the local fish plant closed. In June 2016, it was announced that Black Tickle would no longer be covered by a full-time nurse and could lose its fuel source during winter months. In August of the same year, it was announced that the full-time nurse would be remaining in Black Tickle. The town, working with an indigenous company, announced in 2021 that Black Tickle would be getting a new fuel supply source.

Beginning in 2015, it has been in the news for its large presence of polar bears.

== Geography ==
Black Tickle-Domino is located on the Northwestern head of the Island of Ponds off the coast of Southwestern Labrador within Subdivision B of Division No. 10.

== Demographics ==
Population trend
| Year | Pop. | ±% |
|---|---|---|
| 2011 | 168 | — |
| 2016 | 150 | −10.7% |
| 2021 | 87 | −42.0% |

As a designated place in the 2021 Census of Population conducted by Statistics Canada, Black Tickle-Domino recorded a population of 87 living in 33 of its 72 total private dwellings, a change of −42% from its 2016 population of 150. With a land area of 9.43 km^{2} (3.64 sq mi), it had a population density of 15.9/km^{2} (41.2/sq mi) in 2016.

== Government ==
Black Tickle-Domino is a local service district (LSD) that is governed by a committee responsible for the provision of certain services to the community. The chair of the LSD committee is Joseph Keefe.
