= Benevolent Irish Society =

Canadian philanthropic organization

Coordinates: 47°34′00.43″N 52°42′33.8″W

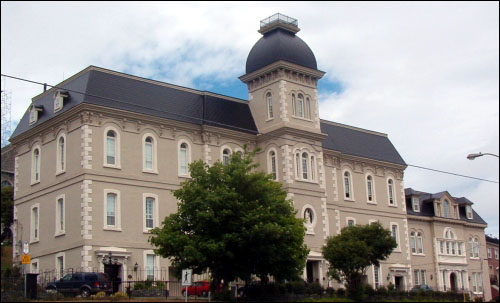
BIS building, St. Patrick's Hall, St. John's, Newfoundland

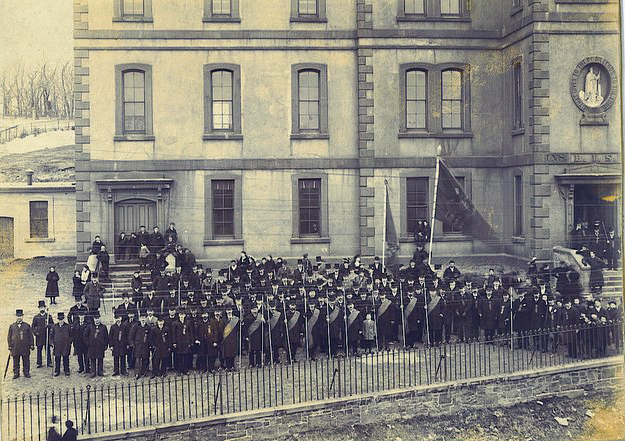
BIS c. 1906

The Benevolent Irish Society (BIS) is a philanthropic organization founded on 17 February 1806, a month before the Feast of St. Patrick, in St. John's, Newfoundland. It is the oldest philanthropic organization in North America. Membership is open to adult residents of Newfoundland who are of Irish birth or ancestry, regardless of religious persuasion. The BIS is a charitable, fraternal, middle-class social organization founded on the principles of "benevolence and philanthropy", and had as its original objective of helping the growing numbers of poor in St. John's, and providing the necessary skills which would enable people to better themselves. The rules of the BIS prohibited members from formally discussing political or religious questions, but the Society occasionally took a public political stand. In 1829 it participated in a large parade through St. John's to celebrate Roman Catholic Emancipation.

In the early years of the nineteenth century, St. John's had a large Irish population with some members of affluence. Many of these Irish both saw social needs which were not being met by government, and desired to belong to a fraternal, gentlemanly organization. Under Bishop O'Donel's patronage, they founded the BIS under the motto He that gives to the poor lends to the Lord.

By the 1820s, many BIS members were beginning to play prominent roles in the political life of Newfoundland and the Irish community in St. John's. By the 1840s the BIS had become so wealthy and influential that, next to the House of Assembly and the governor's council, the BIS was able to marshal considerable resources to address social problems and needs. In 1876 it sponsored the establishment in St. John's of the Irish Christian Brothers, and assisted with the maintenance of the Saint Bonaventure's College and the opening of St. Patrick's School.

In 1996, the then Taoiseach of Ireland, John Bruton, visited the BIS in St. Patrick's Hall on St. Patrick's Day.

The headquarters of the BIS, fronting on Queen's Road, backing on Military Road opposite of the Basilicia, with its side on Garrison Hill, was converted into a condominium residence in the late 1990s/early 2000s; the price of a single condo unit can reach over 1 million Canadian dollars. The BIS is now based about two minutes walk west at 30 Harvey Road.

== See also ==
- Irish Newfoundlanders
