= George Chesley Harris =

Canadian businessman and politician

George Chesley Harris (July 14, 1879 – January 28, 1954) was a merchant and politician in Newfoundland. He represented Burin in the Newfoundland House of Assembly from 1923 to 1924.

The son of Samuel Harris, a merchant and ship owner, and Mary Forsey, he was born in Grand Bank and was educated there and at Mount Allison University in New Brunswick. After completing a business course, Harris joined his father's export firm. In 1914, he became managing director for the company. The company expanded rapidly but a decline in market conditions and changes in government regulations led to the firm declaring bankruptcy in 1923. Harris began work in another of his father's companies, Western Marine Insurance Company, later becoming its president.

In 1904, he married Charlotte "Lottie" Pitts Pratt, the sister of poet E. J. Pratt.

Harris was elected to the Newfoundland assembly in 1923 as a Liberal-Labour-Progressive member. In 1924, his cousin Albert Hickman became premier and Harris transferred his support to the new government leader. He was defeated when he ran for reelection in 1924.

Harris later campaigned in support of union with Canada. He was named Chief Returning Officer for the Canadian federal riding of Burin—Burgeo in 1949 and served in that position again for the federal election held in 1953.

His former home, the George C. Harris House, was designated a Registered Heritage Structure in 1993.
