= Richard Devereaux =

Newfoundland politician and accountant

Richard J. Devereaux (1864 – October 4, 1920) was a politician and official in Newfoundland. He represented Placentia and St. Mary's in the Newfoundland House of Assembly from 1909 to 1919.

He was born in Trepassey and was educated at Saint Bonaventure's College. Devereaux graduated in 1881 and joined the Bonavista fish export firm of J. and D. Ryan as an accountant. He ran unsuccessfully for a seat in the Newfoundland assembly in 1908 before being elected the following year. Devereaux was reelected in 1913. In 1910, he was named a justice of the peace. By 1911, he had been named a commissioner for the Newfoundland Agricultural Board, resigning that post when he was named Controller of Liquor in 1917. He married a Miss Dominy and they had two daughters. Devereau died in St. John's in 1920.
