= 1885 Newfoundland general election =

Election in the Colony of Newfoundland

- October 31, 1885

36 seats of the Newfoundland House of Assembly 19 seats needed for a majority
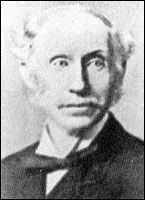

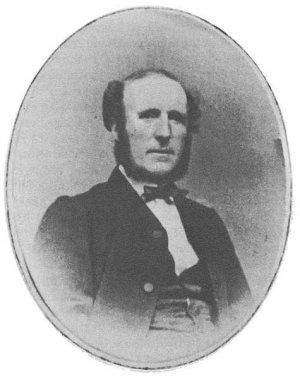
	First party	Second party
Leader	Robert Thorburn	Ambrose Shea
Party	Reform	Liberal
Leader since	1885	1885
Leader's seat	Trinity Bay (Note: Not the incumbent, but ran in this district and won.)	St. John's East
Last election	5 (Note: As the New Party)	26 (Note: As the Conservative Party, a denominationally unified front led by William Whiteway)
Seats won	21	13
Seat change	▲16	▼13
Popular vote	12,213	11,983
Percentage	39.78%	39.03%
Swing	▲11.17%	▼26.49%
- Results by district
Premier before election
Robert Thorburn
Reform
Premier after election
Robert Thorburn
Reform

The 1885 Newfoundland general election was held on October 31, 1885 to elect members of the 15th General Assembly of Newfoundland in the Newfoundland Colony. The denominationally unified Whiteway government had fallen as supporters of the Orange Order abandoned him following the Harbour Grace Affray. Members of the opposition New Party aligned themselves with Protestant members of Whiteway's administration to create the Reform Party. Led by Robert Thorburn, a former member of the Legislative Council, the Reform Party ran on a platform of "Protestant rights." The Roman Catholic caucus within Whiteway's administration formed the Liberal led by Ambrose Shea, who had also turned against the Whiteway government. Many candidates who continued to support Whiteway ran as independents, which provided the opposition in some of the most denominationally skewed districts. Thorburn's new party swept to power, but it soon turned away from its sectarian agenda by inviting Catholic Liberals into the Executive Council.

== Results ==
Party	Leader	1882	Candidates	Seats won	Seat change	% of seats (% change)	Popular vote	% of vote (% change)
Reform	Robert Thorburn	5	22	21	▲16	58.33% (▲43.18%)	12,213	39.78% (▲11.17%)
Liberal	Ambrose Shea	26	14	13	▼13	36.11% (▼42.68%)	11,983	39.03% (▼26.49%)
Other		2	14	2	Steady	5.56% (▼0.50%)	6,506	21.19% (▲15.32%)
Totals		33	50	36	▲3	100%	30,702	100%

== Results by district ==
- Names in **boldface type** represent party leaders.
- † indicates that the incumbent did not run again.
- ‡ indicates that the incumbent ran in a different district.

=== St. John's ===
Electoral district	Candidates		Incumbent
Electoral district	Liberal (historical)	Other	Incumbent
St. John's East	Robert Kent; 1,738; 28.70%	Robert Parsons Jr. (Independent); 635; 10.49%	Robert Kent
St. John's East	**Ambrose Shea**; 1,711; 28.26%	John Dearin (Independent); 437; 7.22%	John Dearin
St. John's East	Michael O'Mara; 1,498; 24.74%	Thomas Mitchell (Independent); 36; 0.59%	Robert Parsons Jr.
St. John's West	Patrick Scott; 1,250; 26.44%	Edward Morris (Independent); 1,651; 34.92%	Patrick Scott
St. John's West	James Callanan; 1,013; 21.43%	Edward Morris (Independent); 1,651; 34.92%	Philip White†
St. John's West	James Furlong; 814; 17.22%	Edward Morris (Independent); 1,651; 34.92%	James Callanan

=== Conception Bay ===
Electoral district	Candidates			Incumbent
Electoral district	Reform	Liberal (historical)	Other	Incumbent
Bay de Verde	Stephen March; 850; 40.81%		Levi Garland (Independent); 350; 16.80%	Levi Garland
Bay de Verde	A. J. W. McNeilly; 765; 36.73%		Beverly Somerville (Independent); 118; 5.66%	New seat
Carbonear	Alfred Penney; Won by acclamation			Alfred Penney
Harbour Grace	James Winter; 1,183; 31.33%		Joseph Russell (Independent); 276; 7.31%	**Ambrose Shea**‡ (ran in St. John's East)
Harbour Grace	Charles Dawe; 1,077; 28.52%		William Butt (Independent); 232; 6.14%	Charles Dawe
Harbour Grace	Joseph Godden; 1,008; 26.69%		William Butt (Independent); 232; 6.14%	New seat
Harbour Main		John Veitch; 711; 42.91%	Thomas Murphy (Independent); 291; 17.56%	Vacant (Note: Joseph Little had been elected in 1882, but he was appointed to the Supreme Court in 1883.)
Harbour Main		Richard MacDonnell; 655; 39.53%	Thomas Murphy (Independent); 291; 17.56%	Richard MacDonnell
Port de Grave	George Hutchings; Won by acclamation			John Bartlett†

=== Avalon Peninsula ===
Electoral district	Candidates		Incumbent
Electoral district	Reform	Liberal (historical)	Incumbent
Ferryland		Daniel Greene; Won by acclamation	Daniel Greene
Ferryland		George Shea; Won by acclamation	Augustus Goodridge‡ (ran in Twillingate)
Placentia and St. Mary's	William Siteman; 504; 16.27%	James McGrath; 940; 30.35%	William Donnelly
Placentia and St. Mary's	William Siteman; 504; 16.27%	William Donnelly; 922; 29.77%	Albert Bradshaw‡ (ran in St. Barbe)
Placentia and St. Mary's	William Siteman; 504; 16.27%	George Emerson; 731; 23.60%	Michael Tobin†

=== Eastern Newfoundland ===
Electoral district	Candidates		Incumbent
Electoral district	Reform	Other	Incumbent
Bonavista Bay	James Noonan; 1,064; 23.88%	George Skelton (Independent); 770; 17.28%	James Noonan
Bonavista Bay	Abram Kean; 957; 21.48%	Alfred Morine (Independent); 724; 16.25%	George Skelton
Bonavista Bay	Frederick White; 941; 21.12%	Alfred Morine (Independent); 724; 16.25%	Francis Winton†
Trinity Bay	**Robert Thorburn**; Won by acclamation		William Whiteway†
Trinity Bay	Walter Grieve; Won by acclamation		Joseph Boyd†
Trinity Bay	Ellis Watson; Won by acclamation		Robert Bond‡ (ran in Fortune Bay)

=== Central Newfoundland ===
Electoral district	Candidates		Incumbent
Electoral district	Reform	Other	Incumbent
Fogo	James Rolls; Won by acclamation		New district
Twillingate	Augustus Goodridge; 1,095; 32.78%	Jabez Thompson (Independent); 577; 17.28%	Smith McKay; Twillingate and Fogo
Twillingate	Smith McKay; 1,058; 31.68%	Jabez Thompson (Independent); 577; 17.28%	Richard Rice†; Twillingate and Fogo
Twillingate	Michael Knight; 610; 18.26%	Jabez Thompson (Independent); 577; 17.28%	Jabez Thompson; Twillingate and Fogo

=== Southern and Western Newfoundland ===
Electoral district	Candidates			Incumbent
Electoral district	Reform	Liberal (historical)	Other	Incumbent
Burgeo and LaPoile	Alexander Mackay; Won by acclamation			Alexander Mackay
Burin	John Peters; 574; 38.01%		J. Brien (Independent); 409; 27.09%	James Winter‡ (ran in Harbour Grace)
Burin	Henry LeMessurier; 527; 34.90%		J. Brien (Independent); 409; 27.09%	John Peters
Fortune Bay			Robert Bond (Independent); Won by acclamation	James Fraser†
St. Barbe	Albert Bradshaw; Won by acclamation			Vacant (Note: John Boone had been elected in 1882, but he had died while in office on November 16, 1884.); White Bay
St. George's		Michael Carty; Won by acclamation		Michael Carty
