= 15th General Assembly of Newfoundland =

Colony of Newfoundland legislature

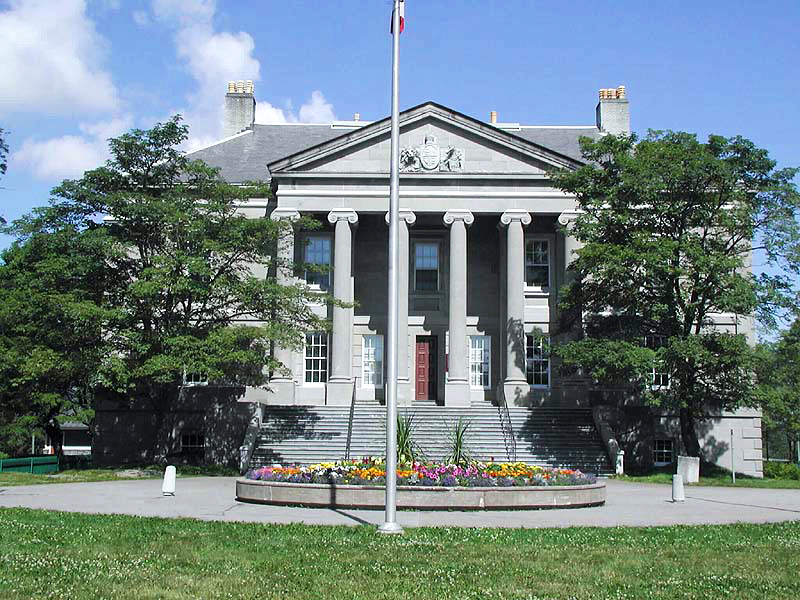
- Colonial Building seat of the Newfoundland government and the House of Assembly from January 28, 1850, to July 28, 1959.

History
- Founded: 1886
- Disbanded: 1889
- Preceded by: 14th General Assembly of Newfoundland
- Succeeded by: 16th General Assembly of Newfoundland

Leadership
- Premier: Robert Thorburn

Elections
- Last election: 1885 Newfoundland general election

The members of the 15th General Assembly of Newfoundland were elected in the Newfoundland general election held in October 1885. The general assembly sat from 1886 to 1889.

The Reform Party led by Robert Thorburn formed the government.

A.J.W. McNeilly was chosen as speaker.

Sir William Des Vœux served as colonial governor of Newfoundland until 1887. Sir Henry Arthur Blake succeeded Des Vœux as governor.

In 1887, the Ballot Act was passed which allowed voting by secret ballot as opposed to the previous system of public oral voting. In 1888, a new Elections Act was passed which defined the required qualifications for candidates for the House of Assembly. In 1889, a new Representation Act was passed which redefined the boundaries of electoral districts.

== Members of the Assembly ==
The following members were elected to the assembly in 1885:

Member	Electoral district	Affiliation	First elected / previously elected
Stephen R. March	Bay de Verde	Reform Party	1885
Alexander J.W. McNeilly	Bay de Verde	Reform Party	1873, 1885
James L. Noonan	Bonavista	Reform Party	1869, 1883
Abram Kean	Bonavista	Reform Party	1885
Frederick White	Bonavista	Reform Party	1885
Alfred B. Morine (1886)	Bonavista	Reform Party	1886
Donald Morison (1888)	Bonavista	Reform Party	1888
Alexander M. Mackay	Burgeo-La Poile	Reform Party	1878
John E. Peters	Burin	Reform Party	1882
Henry LeMessurier	Burin	Reform Party	1885
Alfred Penney	Carbonear	Reform Party	1882
Daniel J. Greene	Ferryland	Liberal	1878
George Shea	Ferryland	Liberal	1885
James Rolls	Fogo	Reform Party	1885
Robert Bond	Fortune Bay	Independent	1882
James S. Winter	Harbour Grace	Reform Party	1873
Charles Dawe	Harbour Grace	Reform Party	1878
Joseph Godden	Harbour Grace	Reform Party	1868, 1874, 1885
John Veitch	Harbour Main	Liberal	1885
Richard MacDonnell	Harbour Main	Liberal	1882
James McGrath	Placentia and St. Mary's	Liberal	1885
William J. S. Donnelly	Placentia and St. Mary's	Liberal	1878
William J. S. Donnelly	Placentia and St. Mary's	Reform Party	1878
George H. Emerson	Placentia and St. Mary's	Liberal	1885
George A. Hutchings	Port de Grave	Reform Party	1885
Albert Bradshaw	St. Barbe	Reform Party	1885
Michael H. Carty	St. George's	Liberal	1882
Robert J. Kent	St. John's East	Liberal	1873
Ambrose Shea	St. John's East	Liberal	1848, 1874
Michael J. O'Mara	St. John's East	Liberal	1878, 1885
Thomas J. Murphy (1886)	St. John's East	Liberal	1886
Robert John Parsons, Jr. (1887)	St. John's East	Liberal	1869, 1878, 1887
Edward Morris	St. John's West	Liberal	1885
Patrick J. Scott	St. John's West	Liberal	1873
James J. Callanan	St. John's West	Liberal	1882
Robert Thorburn	Trinity	Reform Party	1885
Walter B. Grieve	Trinity	Reform Party	1885
Ellis Watson	Trinity	Reform Party	1885
Augustus F. Goodridge	Twillingate	Reform Party	1880
Smith McKay	Twillingate	Reform Party	1882
Michael T. Knight	Twillingate	Reform Party	1885

== By-elections ==
By-elections were held to replace members for various reasons:

Electoral district	Member elected	Affiliation	Election date	Reason
Twillingate	Michael T. Knight	Reform Party	June 9, 1886	MT Knight named to cabinet, so was required to run again
Bonavista	Alfred B. Morine	Independent	June 12, 1886	JL Noonan named to cabinet, so was required to run again
Carbonear	Alfred Penney	Reform Party	November 1, 1886	A Penney named to cabinet, so was required to run again
Placentia and St. Mary's	William J. S. Donnelly	Reform Party	November 1, 1886	WJS Donnelly named to cabinet, so was required to run again
St. John's East	Thomas J. Murphy	Liberal	November 6, 1886	RJ Kent resigned seat
St. John's East	Robert John Parsons, Jr.	Liberal	November 12, 1887	A Shea named governor of the Bahamas
Bonavista	Donald Morison	Reform Party	November 10, 1888 (Note: First by-election for Newfoundland by secret ballot)	A Kean resigned seat
