= 1882 Newfoundland general election =

Election in the Colony of Newfoundland

- November 6, 1882

33 seats of the Newfoundland House of Assembly 17 seats needed for a majority
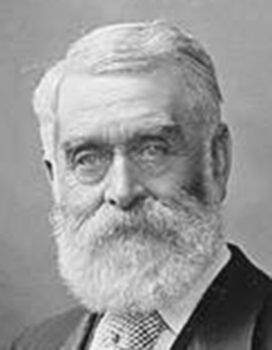

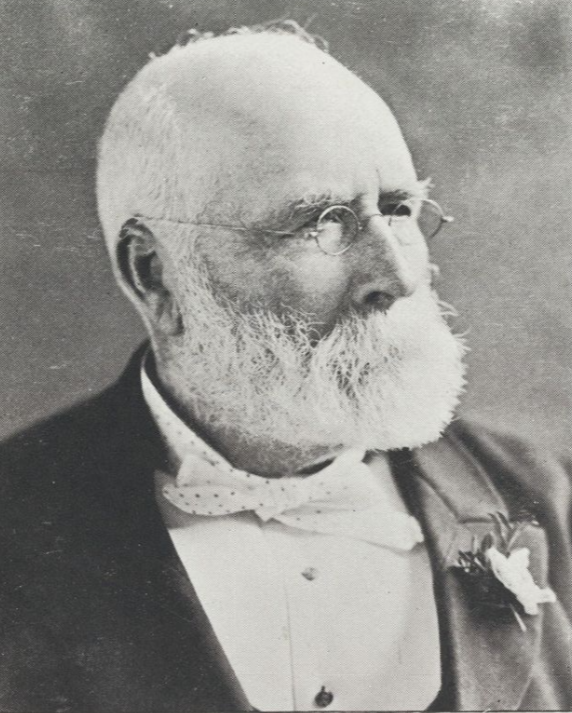

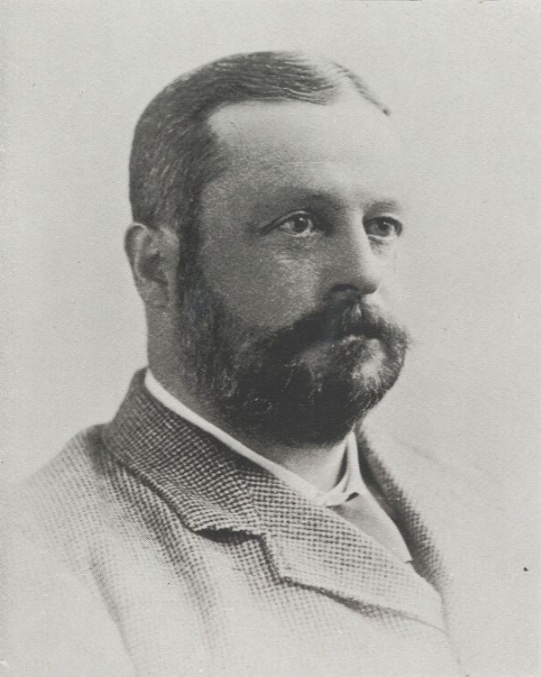
	First party	Second party
Leader	William Whiteway	James Rogerson and Walter Grieve
Party	Conservative	New
Leader since	1878	1882 / 1882
Leader's seat	Trinity Bay	Burin (Note: Ran in Bay de Verde and lost.) / Bonavista Bay (Note: Not the incumbent, but ran in this district and won.)
Last election	21	10 (Note: As the Opposition Party)
Seats won	26	5
Seat change	▲5	▼5
Popular vote	25,873	11,298
Percentage	65.52%	28.61%
Swing	▲9.66% (Note: Based on incomplete figures from the previous election)	▼15.53%
- Results by district
Premier before election
William Whiteway
Conservative
Premier after election
William Whiteway
Conservative

The 1882 Newfoundland general election was held on November 6, 1882 to elect the members of the 14th General Assembly of Newfoundland in the Newfoundland Colony. The Conservative Party led by William Whiteway was re-elected on a platform promising the continued development of the Newfoundland Railway. Much of the Opposition Party from the previous election had disintegrated, but Whiteway's remaining opponents coalesced around James J. Rogerson, the former Receiver General, and formed the New Party.

== Results ==
Party	Leader(s)	1878	Candidates	Seats won	Seat change	% of seats (% change)	Popular vote	% of vote (% change)
Conservative	William Whiteway	21	31	26	▲5	78.79% (▲11.05%)	25,873	65.52% (▲9.66%)
New	James Rogerson and Walter Grieve	10	27	5	▼5	15.15% (▼17.11%)	11,298	28.61% (▼15.53%)
Other		0	7	2	▲2	6.06% (▲6.06%)	2,320	5.87% (▲5.87%)
Totals		31	65	33	▲2	100%	39,491	100%

== Results by district ==
- Names in **boldface type** represent party leaders.
- † indicates that the incumbent did not run again.
- ‡ indicates that the incumbent ran in a different district.

=== St. John's ===
Electoral district	Candidates		Incumbent
Electoral district	Conservative (historical)	Liberal (historical)	Incumbent
St. John's East	Robert Kent; 1,094; 22.42%	Michael O'Mara; 891; 18.26%	Michael O'Mara
St. John's East	John Dearin; 1,060; 21.72%	J. Callanan; 823; 16.86%	Robert Kent
St. John's East	Robert Parsons Jr. 1,012; 20.74%	J. Callanan; 823; 16.86%	Robert Parsons Jr.
St. John's West	Patrick Scott; 1,206; 31.20%	Garret Dooley; 653; 16.89%	Lewis Tessier†
St. John's West	Philip White; 1,061; 27.44%	Garret Dooley; 653; 16.89%	Patrick Scott
St. John's West	James Callanan; 946; 24.47%	Garret Dooley; 653; 16.89%	James McLoughlan†

=== Conception Bay ===
Electoral district	Candidates			Incumbent
Electoral district	Conservative (historical)	Liberal (historical)	Other	Incumbent
Bay de Verde	Michael Knight; 218; 23.22%	**James Rogerson**; 359; 38.23%	Levi Garland (Independent); 362; 38.55%	Alfred Penney‡ (ran in Carbonear)
Carbonear	Alfred Penney; 470; 77.81%	William Giles; 40; 6.62%	Patrick Hogan (Independent); 94; 15.56%	John Rorke†
Harbour Grace	Charles Dawe; 1,749; 46.97%	Thomas Alcock; 165; 4.43%		Ambrose Shea
Harbour Grace	Ambrose Shea; 1,683; 45.19%	George Emerson; 127; 3.41%		Charles Dawe
Harbour Main	Joseph Little; 945; 44.68%	Charles Furey; 300; 14.18%		Joseph Little
Harbour Main	Richard MacDonnell; 870; 41.13%	Charles Furey; 300; 14.18%		Patrick Nowlan†
Port de Grave	Nathan Norman; 146; 14.36%	James Goodfellow; 245; 24.09%	John Bartlett (Independent); 611; 60.08%	Nathan Norman
Port de Grave	Nathan Norman; 146; 14.36%	James Goodfellow; 245; 24.09%	? Barnes (Independent); 15; 1.47%	Nathan Norman

=== Avalon Peninsula ===
Electoral district	Candidates		Incumbent
Electoral district	Conservative (historical)	Liberal (historical)	Incumbent
Ferryland		Augustus Goodridge; Won by acclamation	Augustus Goodridge
Ferryland		Daniel Greene; Won by acclamation	Daniel Greene
Placentia and St. Mary's	William Donnelly; 876; 26.49%	Albert Bradshaw; 672; 20.32%	William Donnelly
Placentia and St. Mary's	Michael Tobin; 609; 18.42%	Richard McGrath; 369; 11.16%	James Collins†
Placentia and St. Mary's	Michael Dwyer; 595; 17.99%	David Sclater; 186; 5.62%	Michael Dwyer

=== Eastern and Central Newfoundland ===
Electoral district	Candidates			Incumbent
Electoral district	Conservative (historical)	Liberal (historical)	Other	Incumbent
Bonavista Bay (Note: Following the election, Noonan submitted a petition to the House of Assembly arguing that Grieve was ineligible for office as he had been employed by the government at the time. The House heeded Noonan's petition, and he was declared elected on February 26, 1883.)	George Skelton; 704; 18.75%	**Walter Grieve**; 739; 19.68%		Francis Winton
Bonavista Bay	Francis Winton; 695; 18.51%	James Noonan; 619; 16.48%		George Skelton
Bonavista Bay	James Saint; 553; 14.73%	Henry Woods; 445; 11.85%		James Saint
Trinity Bay	**William Whiteway**; 1,176; 26.73%	Stephen March; 744; 16.91%	James Watson (Independent); 733; 16.66%	**William Whiteway**
Trinity Bay	Joseph Boyd; 849; 19.30%	Jacob Morris; 507; 11.53%	James Watson (Independent); 733; 16.66%	James Watson
Trinity Bay	Robert Bond; 812; 18.46%	Richard Penny; 311; 7.07%	James Watson (Independent); 733; 16.66%	John Rendell†
Twillingate and Fogo	Smith McKay; 1,357; 24.96%	? Herbert; 680; 12.51%		A. J. W. McNeilly
Twillingate and Fogo	Richard Rice; 1,190; 21.89%	A. J. W. McNeilly; 591; 10.87%		Stanley Carter†
Twillingate and Fogo	Jabez Thompson; 1,108; 20.38%	? Winton; 510; 9.38%		Richard Rice

=== Southern and Western Newfoundland ===
Electoral district	Candidates			Incumbent
Electoral district	Conservative (historical)	Liberal (historical)	Other	Incumbent
Burgeo and LaPoile	Alexander Mackay; 473; 57.54%		James Murray (Independent); 346; 42.09%	Alexander Mackay
Burin	James Winter; 450; 25.85%	John Peters; 441; 25.33%		James Winter
Burin	George Forsey; 435; 24.99%	E. McGhee; 415; 23.84%		**James Rogerson**‡ (ran in Bay de Verde)
Fortune Bay	James Fraser; 467; 60.57%	Charles Bowring; 304; 39.43%		James Fraser
St. George's (Note: The election in this district was held on October 21, 1882.)	Michael Carty; 422; 72.63%		? Walsh (Independent); 159; 27.37%	New district
White Bay	John Boone; 642; 79.85%	Ellis Watson; 162; 20.15%		New district
