= 1889 Newfoundland general election =

Election in the Colony of Newfoundland

- November 6, 1889

36 seats of the Newfoundland House of Assembly 19 seats needed for a majority
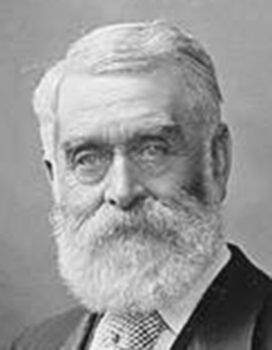

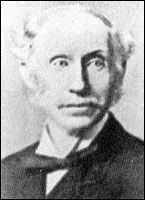
| | First party | Second party |
|---|---|---|
| Leader | William Whiteway | Robert Thorburn |
| Party | Liberal | Reform |
| Leader since | 1885 | 1885 |
| Leader's seat | Trinity Bay (Note: Not the incumbent, but ran in this district and won.) | Trinity Bay (lost re-election) |
| Last election | 13 seats, 39.03% | 21 seats, 39.78% |
| Seats won | 28 | 7 |
| Seat change | ▲15 | ▼14 |
| Popular vote | 37,123 | 22,292 |
| Percentage | 60.86% | 36.54% |
| Swing | ▲21.83% | ▼3.24% |
- Results by district
Premier before election
Robert Thorburn
Reform
Premier after election
William Whiteway
Liberal

The 1889 Newfoundland general election was held on 6 November 1889 to elect members of the 16th General Assembly of Newfoundland in Newfoundland Colony. The Reform Party administration of Robert Thorburn was defeated in favour of the Liberal Party led by William Whiteway formed the government. Reform soon disappeared and was replaced by the Orange Order based Tory Party. This was the first general election held in Newfoundland using the secret ballot.

== Results ==
| Party | Leader | 1885 | Candidates | Seats won | Seat change | % of seats (% change) | Popular vote | % of vote (% change) |
|---|---|---|---|---|---|---|---|---|
| Liberal | William Whiteway | 13 | 32 | 28 | ▲15 | 77.78% (▲41.67%) | 37,123 | 60.86% (▲21.83%) |
| Reform | Robert Thorburn | 21 | 34 | 7 | ▼14 | 19.44% (▼38.89%) | 22,292 | 36.54% (▼3.24%) |
| Other | | 2 | 6 | 1 | ▼1 | 2.78% (▼2.78%) | 1,586 | 2.60% (▼18.59%) |
| Totals | | 36 | 72 | 36 | Steady | 100% | 61,001 | 100% |

== Results by district ==
- Names in **boldface type** represent party leaders.
- † indicates that the incumbent did not run again.
- ‡ indicates that the incumbent ran in a different district.

=== St. John's ===
| Electoral district | Candidates | | | Incumbent |
| Electoral district | Reform | Liberal (historical) | Other | Incumbent |
|---|---|---|---|---|
| St. John's East | Michael O'Mara; 854; 11.47% | Thomas Murphy; 1,747; 23.46% | Robert Parsons Jr.(Independent); 233; 3.13% | Thomas Murphy |
| St. John's East | Lawrence Furlong; 819; 11.00% | John Dearin; 1,716; 23.04% | Robert Parsons Jr.(Independent); 233; 3.13% | Robert Parsons Jr. |
| St. John's East | Francis St. John; 609; 8.18% | Jeremiah Halleran; 1,469; 19.73% | Robert Parsons Jr.(Independent); 233; 3.13% | Michael O'Mara |
| St. John's West | Patrick Scott; 957; 16.23% | Edward Morris; 1,566; 26.55% | John Shea (Independent); 137; 2.32% | Edward Morris |
| St. John's West | James Callanan; 741; 12.56% | James Day; 1,326; 22.48% | Pierce Brien (Independent); 117; 1.98% | Patrick Scott |
| St. John's West | James Callanan; 741; 12.56% | Lawrence Gearin; 1,054; 17.87% | Pierce Brien (Independent); 117; 1.98% | James Callanan |

=== Conception Bay ===
| Electoral district | Candidates | | | Incumbent |
| Electoral district | Reform | Liberal (historical) | Other | Incumbent |
|---|---|---|---|---|
| Bay de Verde | Stephen March; 476; 19.29% | Edward White; 820; 33.23% | | Stephen March |
| Bay de Verde | Aubrey Crocker; 399; 16.17% | Henry Woods; 773; 31.32% | | A. J. W. McNeilly† |
| Carbonear; 72.28% turnout | Alfred Penney; 284; 33.93% | William Duff; 486; 58.06% | Robert Moore (Independent); 67; 8.00% | Alfred Penney |
| Harbour Grace | Robert Munn; 1,259; 23.95% | William Whiteley; 1,367; 26.00% | | James Winter |
| Harbour Grace | Charles Dawe; 685; 13.03% | Eli Dawe; 1,342; 25.53% | | Charles Dawe |
| Harbour Grace | James Winter; 604; 11.49% | Eli Dawe; 1,342; 25.53% | | Joseph Godden† |
| Harbour Main | Maurice Fenelon; 180; 6.02% | Frank Morris; 1,448; 48.46% | | John Veitch† |
| Harbour Main | Maurice Fenelon; 180; 6.02% | William Woodford; 1,360; 45.52% | | Richard MacDonnell† |
| Port de Grave; 71.80% turnout | William Horwood; 564; 46.92% | James Clift; 638; 53.08% | | George Hutchings† |

=== Avalon Peninsula ===
| Electoral district | Candidates | | | Incumbent |
| Electoral district | Reform | Liberal (historical) | Other | Incumbent |
|---|---|---|---|---|
| Ferryland | George Shea; 727; 36.06% | Martin W. Furlong; 425; 21.08% | Michael Condon (Independent); 373; 18.50% | Daniel Greene |
| Ferryland | Daniel Greene; 491; 24.36% | Martin W. Furlong; 425; 21.08% | Michael Condon (Independent); 373; 18.50% | George Shea |
| Placentia and St. Mary's | William Donnelly; 897; 17.74% | George Emerson; 1,077; 21.30% | | James McGrath |
| Placentia and St. Mary's | William Siteman; 555; 10.98% | Richard O'Dwyer; 1,018; 20.13% | | William Donnelly |
| Placentia and St. Mary's | J. Tobin; 515; 10.19% | James McGrath; 994; 19.66% | | George Emerson |

=== Eastern Newfoundland ===
| Electoral district | Candidates | | Incumbent |
| Electoral district | Reform | Liberal (historical) | Incumbent |
|---|---|---|---|
| Bonavista Bay | Donald Morison; 1,429; 18.32% | Samuel Blandford; 1,382; 17.72% | Alfred Morine |
| Bonavista Bay | Alfred Morine; 1,333; 17.09% | George Johnson; 1,283; 16.45% | Donald Morison |
| Bonavista Bay | Alfred Vincent; 1,228; 15.75% | William Davis; 1,144; 14.67% | Frederick White† |
| Trinity Bay | Walter Grieve; 789; 9.87% | **William Whiteway**; 2,094; 26.19% | **Robert Thorburn** |
| Trinity Bay | Ellis Watson; 746; 9.33% | Robert Bond; 1,908; 23.86% | Walter Grieve |
| Trinity Bay | **Robert Thorburn**; 698; 8.73% | David Webber; 1,760; 22.01% | Ellis Watson |

=== Central Newfoundland ===
| Electoral district | Candidates | | Incumbent |
| Electoral district | Reform | Liberal (historical) | Incumbent |
|---|---|---|---|
| Fogo; 64.56% turnout | James Rolls; 554; 63.90% | George Skelton; 313; 36.10% | James Rolls |
| Twillingate | Michael Knight; 769; 13.68% | Edward Burgess; 1,174; 20.88% | Augustus Goodridge |
| Twillingate | Smith McKay; 732; 13.02% | Jabez P. Thompson; 1,140; 20.27% | Smith McKay |
| Twillingate | Augustus Goodridge; 720; 12.80% | Thomas Peyton; 1,088; 19.35% | Michael Knight |

=== Southern and Western Newfoundland ===
| Electoral district | Candidates | | | Incumbent |
| Electoral district | Reform | Liberal (historical) | Other | Incumbent |
|---|---|---|---|---|
| Burgeo and LaPoile; 68.01% turnout | Henry Mott; 164; 19.92% | | James Murray; 659; 80.07% | Alexander Mackay† |
| Burin | Henry LeMessurier; 579; 23.23% | Edward Rothwell; 684; 27.44% | | John Peters† |
| Burin | Robert McNeily; 552; 22.14% | James Tait; 678; 27.20% | | Henry LeMessurier |
| Fortune Bay; 62.07% turnout | James Fraser Jr. 261; 27.36% | John Studdy; 693; 72.64% | | Robert Bond‡ (ran in Trinity Bay) |
| St. Barbe; 58.80% turnout | Albert Bradshaw; 122; 16.53% | George Fearn; 616; 83.47% | | Albert Bradshaw |
| St. George's | Michael Carty; Won by acclamation | | | Michael Carty |
