= 14th General Assembly of Newfoundland =

Colony of Newfoundland legislature

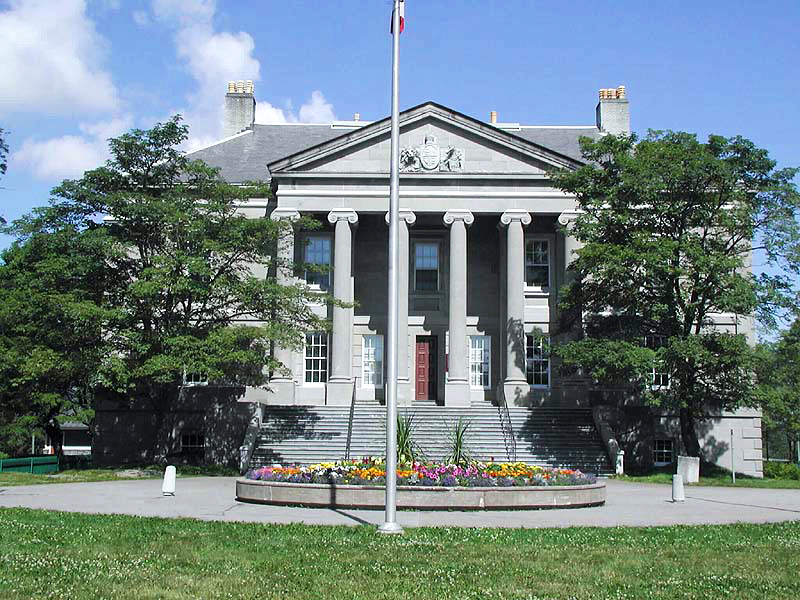
- Colonial Building seat of the Newfoundland government and the House of Assembly from January 28, 1850, to July 28, 1959.

History
- Founded: 1883
- Disbanded: 1885
- Preceded by: 13th General Assembly of Newfoundland
- Succeeded by: 15th General Assembly of Newfoundland

Leadership
- Premier: William Whiteway

Elections
- Last election: 1882 Newfoundland general election

The members of the 14th General Assembly of Newfoundland were elected in the Newfoundland general election held in November 1882. The general assembly sat from 1883 to 1885.

A coalition of the Conservative and Liberal parties led by William Whiteway formed the government.

Robert Kent was chosen as speaker.

Sir John Hawley Glover served as colonial governor of Newfoundland.

Whiteway's government supported the construction of a railway to promote economic growth in the colony. The Newfoundland Railway Company laid 92 kilometres (57 miles) of track before going into receivership in 1884.

On Boxing Day 1883, members of the Orange Order marched through a Roman Catholic section of the town of Harbour Grace. In the resulting confrontation, known as The Harbour Grace Affray, three Orangemen and one Catholic were killed. A subsequent trial of those accused of killing the Orangemen failed to convict anyone because of the lack of witnesses willing to testify. This led to the breakup of Whiteway's coalition and he subsequently resigned as Premier.

== Members of the Assembly ==
The following members were elected to the assembly in 1882:

Member	Electoral district	Affiliation	First elected / previously elected
Levi Garland	Bay de Verde	Independent	1882
Walter B. Grieve	Bonavista Bay	New Party	1882
George Skelton	Bonavista Bay	Coalition	1878
Francis Winton	Bonavista Bay	Coalition	1882
James L. Noonan (1869)	Bonavista Bay	New Party	1869, 1883
Alexander M. Mackay	Burgeo-La Poile	Coalition	1878
James S. Winter	Burin	Coalition	1873
John E. Peters	Burin	New Party	1882
Alfred Penney	Carbonear	Coalition	1882
Daniel J. Greene	Ferryland	New Party	1878
Augustus F. Goodridge	Ferryland	New Party	1880
James O. Fraser	Fortune Bay	Coalition	1878
Ambrose Shea	Harbour Grace	Coalition	1848, 1874
Charles Dawe	Harbour Grace	Coalition	1878
Joseph I. Little	Harbour Main	Coalition	1867
Richard MacDonnell	Harbour Main	Coalition	1882
William J. S. Donnelly	Placentia and St. Mary's	Coalition	1878
Albert Bradshaw	Placentia and St. Mary's	New Party	1882
Michael Tobin	Placentia and St. Mary's	Coalition	1882
John Bartlett	Port de Grave	Independent	1873, 1882
Michael H. Carty	St. George's (Note: Election held October 21, 1882)	Coalition	1882
Robert J. Kent	St. John's East	Coalition	1873
John Joseph Dearin	St. John's East	Coalition	1873, 1882
Robert John Parsons, Jr.	St. John's East	Coalition	1869, 1878
Patrick J. Scott	St. John's West	Coalition	1873
Philip D. White	St. John's West	Coalition	1882
James J. Callanan	St. John's West	Coalition	1882
William Whiteway	Trinity Bay	Coalition	1859, 1873
Robert Bond	Trinity Bay	Coalition	1882
Joseph Boyd	Trinity Bay	Coalition	1882
Smith McKay	Twillingate and Fogo	Coalition	1869, 1882
Richard Rice	Twillingate and Fogo	Coalition	1882
Jabez Thompson	Twillingate and Fogo	Coalition	1882
John H. Boone	White Bay	Coalition	1882

== By-elections ==
By-elections were held to replace members for various reasons:

Electoral district	Member elected	Affiliation	Election date	Reason
Bonavista Bay	James L. Noonan	New Party	1883 (Note: Declared elected)	W Grieve election overturned - employed by government
