= 13th General Assembly of Newfoundland =

Colony of Newfoundland legislature

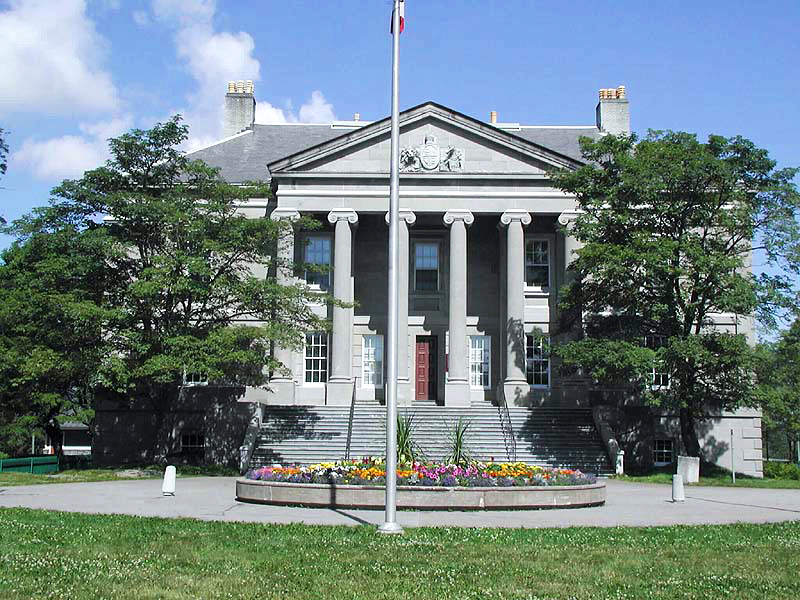
- Colonial Building seat of the Newfoundland government and the House of Assembly from January 28, 1850, to July 28, 1959.

History
- Founded: 1879
- Disbanded: 1882
- Preceded by: 12th General Assembly of Newfoundland
- Succeeded by: 14th General Assembly of Newfoundland

Leadership
- Premier: William Whiteway

Elections
- Last election: 1878 Newfoundland general election

The members of the 13th General Assembly of Newfoundland were elected in the Newfoundland general election held in November 1878. The general assembly sat from 1879 to 1882.

The Conservative Party led by William Whiteway formed the government.

A.J.W. McNeilly was chosen as speaker.

Sir John Hawley Glover served as colonial governor of Newfoundland until 1881. Henry Berkeley Fitzhardinge Maxse succeeded Glover as governor.

== Members of the Assembly ==
The following members were elected to the assembly in 1878:

Member	Electoral district	Affiliation	First elected / previously elected
Alfred Penney	Bay de Verde	Conservative	1878
Francis Winton	Bonavista Bay	Conservative	1869, 1878
George Skelton	Bonavista Bay	Conservative	1878
James Saint	Bonavista Bay	Conservative	1878
Alexander M. Mackay	Burgeo-La Poile	Conservative	1878
James S. Winter	Burin	Conservative	1873
James J. Rogerson	Burin	Conservative	1870
John Rorke	Carbonear	Conservative	1863
James G. Conroy	Ferryland	Liberal	1874
Daniel J. Greene	Ferryland	Liberal	1878
Augustus F. Goodridge (1880)	Ferryland	Conservative	1880
James O. Fraser	Fortune Bay	Conservative	1878
Ambrose Shea	Harbour Grace	Conservative	1848, 1874
Charles Dawe	Harbour Grace	Conservative	1878
Joseph I. Little	Harbour Main	Liberal	1867
Patrick Nowlan	Harbour Main	Liberal	1873
William J. S. Donnelly	Placentia and St. Mary's	Conservative	1878
James Collins	Placentia and St. Mary's	Conservative	1873
Michael E. Dwyer	Placentia and St. Mary's	Conservative	1874
Nathan Norman	Port de Grave	Conservative	1878
Michael J. O'Mara	St. John's East	Liberal	1878
Robert J. Kent	St. John's East	Liberal	1873
Robert John Parsons, Jr.	St. John's East	Liberal	1869, 1878
Lewis Tessier	St. John's West	Liberal	1873
Patrick J. Scott	St. John's West	Liberal	1873
Maurice Fenelon	St. John's West	Liberal	1873
William Whiteway	Trinity Bay	Conservative	1859, 1873
James H. Watson	Trinity Bay	Conservative	1874
John Randall	Trinity Bay	Conservative	1878
Alexander J.W. McNeilly	Twillingate and Fogo	Conservative	1873
Stanley B. Carter	Twillingate and Fogo	Conservative	1878
Richard P. Rice	Twillingate and Fogo	Conservative	1878

== By-elections ==
By-elections were held to replace members for various reasons:

Electoral district	Member elected	Affiliation	Election date	Reason
Ferryland	Augustus F. Goodridge	Conservative	1880	J. G. Conroy retired
