= 1878 Newfoundland general election =

Election in the Colony of Newfoundland

- November 9, 1878

31 seats of the Newfoundland House of Assembly 16 seats needed for a majority
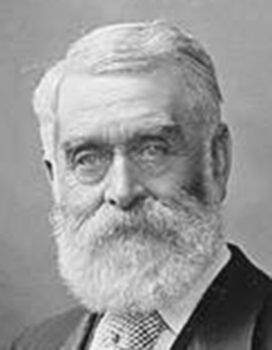

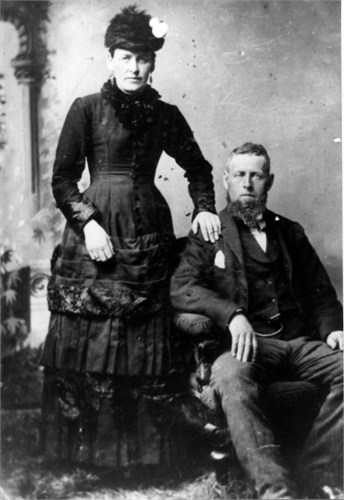

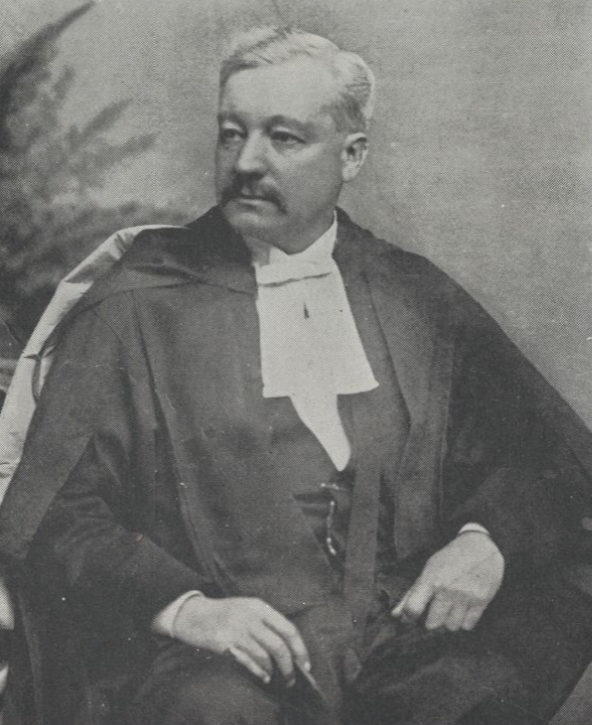
| | First party | Second party |
|---|---|---|
| Leader | William Whiteway | James Conroy and Robert Pinsent |
| Party | Conservative | Opposition |
| Leader since | 1878 | 1878 / 1878 |
| Leader's seat | Trinity Bay | Ferryland / Ran in Burin (lost) |
| Last election | 18 | 13 (Note: As the Anti-Confederation Party) |
| Seats won | 21 | 10 |
| Seat change | ▲3 | ▼3 |
| Popular vote | 7,813 (Note: Note that this does not include the vote totals for the districts of Carbonear, Harbour Main, and Port de Grave, as the full results of those contests are not available.) | 6,174 |
| Percentage | 55.86% | 44.14% |
| Swing | ▲0.72% | ▼0.14% |
- Results by district
Premier before election
William Whiteway
Conservative
Premier after election
William Whiteway
Conservative

The 1878 Newfoundland general election was held on November 9, 1878 to elect the members of the 13th General Assembly of Newfoundland in the Newfoundland Colony. The Conservative Party led by William Whiteway formed the government. Whiteway, who had succeeded Frederick Carter earlier in the year, ran on a platform promoting the development of a trans-insular railway. As Anti-Confederate leader Charles Fox Bennett had retired, the opposition to the government became disorganized, and it was loosely led by James Conroy and Robert Pinsent.

== Results ==
| Party | Leader(s) | 1874 | Candidates | Seats won | Seat change | % of seats (% change) | Popular vote | % of vote (% change) |
|---|---|---|---|---|---|---|---|---|
| Conservative | William Whiteway | 18 | 26 | 21 | ▲3 | 67.74% (▲9.68%) | 7,813 | 55.86% (▲0.72%) |
| Opposition | James Conroy and Robert Pinsent | 13 | 15 | 10 | ▼3 | 32.26% (▼9.68%) | 6,174 | 44.14% (▼0.14%) |
| Totals | | 31 | 41 | 31 | Steady | 100% | 13,987 (Note: Given that the majorities are known for the districts of Carbonear and Port de Grave, it is evident that at least 14,340 votes were cast in this election.) | 100% |

== Results by district ==
- Names in **boldface type** represent party leaders.
- † indicates that the incumbent did not run again.
- ‡ indicates that the incumbent ran in a different district.

=== St. John's ===
| Electoral district | Candidates | | Incumbent |
| Electoral district | Conservative (historical) | Liberal (historical) | Incumbent |
|---|---|---|---|
| St. John's East | Robert Parsons Jr. 1,014; 24.36% | Michael O'Mara; 1,114; 26.77% | Robert Kent |
| St. John's East | Robert Parsons Jr. 1,014; 24.36% | Robert Kent; 1,109; 26.65% | Robert Parsons Sr.† |
| St. John's East | Robert Parsons Jr. 1,014; 24.36% | John Dearin; 925; 22.22% | John Dearin |
| St. John's West | | Lewis Tessier; Won by acclamation | Lewis Tessier |
| St. John's West | | Patrick Scott; Won by acclamation | Maurice Fenelon |
| St. John's West | | Maurice Fenelon; Won by acclamation | Patrick Scott |

=== Conception Bay ===
| Electoral district | Candidates | | Incumbent |
| Electoral district | Conservative (historical) | Liberal (historical) | Incumbent |
|---|---|---|---|
| Bay de Verde | Alfred Penney; Won by acclamation | | James Rogerson‡ (ran in Burin) |
| Carbonear | John Rorke; Majority of over 200 votes | Francis Taylor | John Rorke |
| Harbour Grace | Ambrose Shea; 777; 33.40% | Charles Dawe; 823; 35.38% | Ambrose Shea |
| Harbour Grace | Joseph Godden; 726; 31.21% | Charles Dawe; 823; 35.38% | Joseph Godden |
| Harbour Main (Note: Returns are not available for this district.) | Charles Furey | Joseph Little | Joseph Little |
| Harbour Main | Charles Furey | Patrick Nowlan | Patrick Nowlan |
| Port de Grave | Nathan Norman; Majority of 153 votes | | Nathaniel Rabbitts |
| Port de Grave | Nathaniel Rabbitts | | Nathaniel Rabbitts |

=== Avalon Peninsula ===
| Electoral district | Candidates | | Incumbent |
| Electoral district | Conservative (historical) | Liberal (historical) | Incumbent |
|---|---|---|---|
| Ferryland | Richard Raftus; 336; 21.98% | **James Conroy**; 602; 39.37% | Richard Raftus |
| Ferryland | Richard Raftus; 336; 21.98% | Daniel Greene; 591; 38.65% | **James Conroy** |
| Placentia and St. Mary's | William Donnelly; Won by acclamation | | Charles Bennett† |
| Placentia and St. Mary's | James Collins; Won by acclamation | | James Collins |
| Placentia and St. Mary's | Michael Dwyer; Won by acclamation | | Michael Dwyer |

=== Eastern and Central Newfoundland ===
| Electoral district | Candidates | | Incumbent |
| Electoral district | Conservative (historical) | Other | Incumbent |
|---|---|---|---|
| Bonavista Bay | Francis Winton; 1,129; 33.06% | James Saint (Wesleyan Conservative) (Note: Although Saint was a supporter of Whiteway, the election for the district of Bonavista was fought on denominational lines, and he was referred to as a "Wesleyan" opponent of the Whiteway candidates in contemporary sources.); 629; 18.42% | John Warren |
| Bonavista Bay | George Skelton; 1,071; 31.36% | James Saint (Wesleyan Conservative); 629; 18.42% | Charles Bowring† |
| Bonavista Bay | John Warren; 586; 17.16% | James Saint (Wesleyan Conservative); 629; 18.42% | A. J. W. McNeilly‡ (ran in Twillingate and Fogo) |
| Trinity Bay | **William Whiteway**; Won by acclamation | | **William Whiteway** |
| Trinity Bay | James Watson; Won by acclamation | | John Steer† |
| Trinity Bay | John Rendell; Won by acclamation | | James Watson |
| Twillingate and Fogo | A. J. W. McNeilly; Won by acclamation | | Frederick Carter† |
| Twillingate and Fogo | Stanley Carter; Won by acclamation | | Charles Duder† |
| Twillingate and Fogo | Richard Rice; Won by acclamation | | William Kelligrew† |

=== Southern Newfoundland ===
| Electoral district | Candidates | | Incumbent |
| Electoral district | Conservative (historical) | Liberal (historical) | Incumbent |
|---|---|---|---|
| Burgeo and LaPoile | Alexander Mackay; Won by acclamation | | Prescott Emerson† |
| Burin | James Winter; 497; 26.79% | **Robert Pinsent**; 438; 23.61% | Charles Ayre† |
| Burin | James Rogerson; 488; 26.31% | George Bishop; 432; 23.29% | James Winter |
| Fortune Bay | James Fraser; ~ 560; ~ 80.00% | William Wood; ~ 140; ~ 20.00% | Robert Alexander† |
