= 1873 Newfoundland general election =

Election in the Colony of Newfoundland

- November 8, 1873

31 seats of the Newfoundland House of Assembly 16 seats needed for a majority
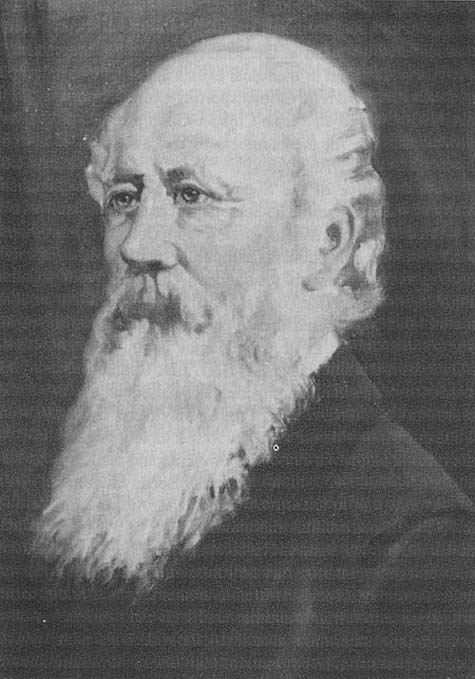

	First party	Second party
Leader	Charles Fox Bennett	Frederick Carter
Party	Anti-Confederation	Conservative
Leader since	1869	1865
Leader's seat	Placentia and St. Mary's	Twillingate and Fogo (Note: Carter chose to contest the new seat in the district of Twillingate and Fogo. As that district had heavily voted for the anti-confederates in 1869, his supporters also nominated him in the more securely pro-confederate district of Harbour Grace in case he lost the former contest. However, Carter was ultimately elected in both districts. He resigned his seat in Harbour Grace prior to the first legislative session, triggering a by-election.)
Last election	21 (Note: This figure includes Henry Renouf's double election in the districts of Placentia and St. Mary's and St. John's West.)	9
Seats won	17	14 (Note: This figure includes Carter's double election in Harbour Grace and Twillingate and Fogo.)
Seat change	▼4	▲5
Popular vote	14,686 (Note: Note that this does not include the vote totals for the districts of Bonavista Bay and Port de Grave, as the full results of those contests are not available.)	9,588
Percentage	60.50%	39.50%
Swing	▼20.27% (Note: Based on incomplete figures from the previous election)	▲20.27%
- Results by district
Premier before election
Charles Fox Bennett
Anti-Confederation
Premier after election
Charles Fox Bennett
Anti-Confederation

The 1873 Newfoundland general election was held on November 8, 1873 to elect members of the 11th General Assembly of Newfoundland in the Colony of Newfoundland. The Anti-Confederates led by Charles Fox Bennett formed the government. Having largely abandoned Confederation with Canada as a platform, Frederick Carter's Conservative Party formed the opposition.

== Results ==
Party	Leader	1869	Candidates	Seats won	Seat change	% of seats (% change)	Popular vote	% of vote (% change)
Anti-Confederation	Charles Fox Bennett	21	24	17	▼4	54.84% (▼15.16%)	14,686	60.50% (▼20.27%)
Conservative	Frederick Carter	9	23	14	▲5	45.16% (▲15.16%)	9,588	39.50% (▲20.27%)
Totals		30	47	31	▲1	100%	24,274	100%

== Results by district ==
- Names in **boldface type** represent party leaders.
- † indicates that the incumbent did not run again.
- ‡ indicates that the incumbent ran in a different district.

=== St. John's ===
Electoral district	Candidates		Incumbent
Electoral district	Anti-Confederation	Conservative (historical)	Incumbent
St. John's East	John Dearin; 1,177; 26.70%	Ambrose Shea; 803; 18.21%	William Walsh†
St. John's East	Robert Parsons Sr. 1,109; 25.15%	John Maher; 254; 5.76%	James Jordan†
St. John's East	Robert Kent; 1,066; 24.18%	John Maher; 254; 5.76%	Robert Parsons Sr.
St. John's West	Lewis Tessier; 1,030; 31.95%	Lawrence Barron; 489; 15.17%	Peter Brennan†
St. John's West	Maurice Fenelon; 897; 27.82%	Lawrence Barron; 489; 15.17%	Maurice Fenelon
St. John's West	Patrick Scott; 808; 25.06%	Lawrence Barron; 489; 15.17%	Lewis Tessier

=== Conception Bay ===
Electoral district	Candidates		Incumbent
Electoral district	Anti-Confederation	Conservative (historical)	Incumbent
Bay de Verde		James Rogerson; Won by acclamation	James Rogerson
Carbonear		John Rorke; Won by acclamation	John Rorke
Harbour Grace	Alexander Parsons; 420; 17.61%	William Wood; 984; 41.26%	John Munn†
Harbour Grace	Alexander Parsons; 420; 17.61%	**Frederick Carter**; 981; 41.13%	William Green†
Harbour Main	Joseph Little; 763; 47.33%	Charles Furey; 290; 17.99%	Joseph Little
Harbour Main	Patrick Nowlan; 559; 34.68%	Charles Furey; 290; 17.99%	John Kennedy†
Port de Grave (Note: Returns are not available for this district.)	John Bartlett	George Gushue	James Woods†

=== Avalon Peninsula ===
Electoral district	Candidates		Incumbent
Electoral district	Anti-Confederation	Conservative (historical)	Incumbent
Ferryland	Thomas Glen; 678; 44.75%	Edward Shea; 171; 11.29%	Thomas Glen
Ferryland	Richard Raftus; 666; 43.96%	Edward Shea; 171; 11.29%	Thomas Badcock†
Placentia and St. Mary's	Henry Renouf; 739; 31.43%	Thomas Rielley; 151; 6.42%	**Charles Fox Bennett**
Placentia and St. Mary's	James Collins; 735; 31.26%	Thomas Rielley; 151; 6.42%	Robert Parsons Jr.†
Placentia and St. Mary's	**Charles Fox Bennett**; 726; 30.88%	Thomas Rielley; 151; 6.42%	Henry Renouf

=== Eastern and Central Newfoundland ===
Electoral district	Candidates		Incumbent
Electoral district	Anti-Confederation	Conservative (historical)	Incumbent
Bonavista Bay	James Noonan	Charles Bowring	James Noonan
Bonavista Bay	William Barnes	A. J. W. McNeilly	William Barnes
Bonavista Bay	Francis Winton	John Burton	Francis Winton
Trinity Bay	Robert Pinsent; 590; 13.28%	John Steer; 1,141; 25.68%	Stephen Rendell†
Trinity Bay	Stephen March; 519; 11.68%	John Warren; 1,102; 24.80%	Alexander Graham†
Trinity Bay	Stephen March; 519; 11.68%	William Whiteway; 1,091; 24.56%	John Warren
Twillingate and Fogo	Charles Duder; 758; 17.49%	**Frederick Carter**; 751; 17.32%	Charles Duder
Twillingate and Fogo	Smith McKay; 746; 17.21%	Stephen Knight; 700; 16.15%	Smith McKay
Twillingate and Fogo	James Rolls; 700; 16.15%	? Windsor; 680; 15.69%	New seat

=== Southern Newfoundland ===
Electoral district	Candidates		Incumbent
Electoral district	Anti-Confederation	Conservative (historical)	Incumbent
Burgeo and LaPoile		Prescott Emerson; Won by acclamation	Prescott Emerson
Burin		James Winter; Won by acclamation	**Frederick Carter**‡ (Ran in Harbour Grace and Twillingate and Fogo)
Burin		Charles Ayre; Won by acclamation	Edward Evans†
Fortune Bay	Thomas Bennett; Won by acclamation		Thomas Bennett
