= General Assembly of Newfoundland and Labrador =

House of Assembly and Lieutenant Governor of Newfoundland and Labrador

- 51st General Assembly of Newfoundland and Labrador

Type
- Type: Bicameral (1832–1934); Unicameral (1949–present)
- Houses: Legislative Council (1832–1934); House of Assembly (1949–present)
- Sovereign: The governor (1832–1949) and the lieutenant governor (1949–present) (representing the King of Canada)

History
- Founded: 1832 (Suspended 1934–1949 during Commission of Government)

Meeting place
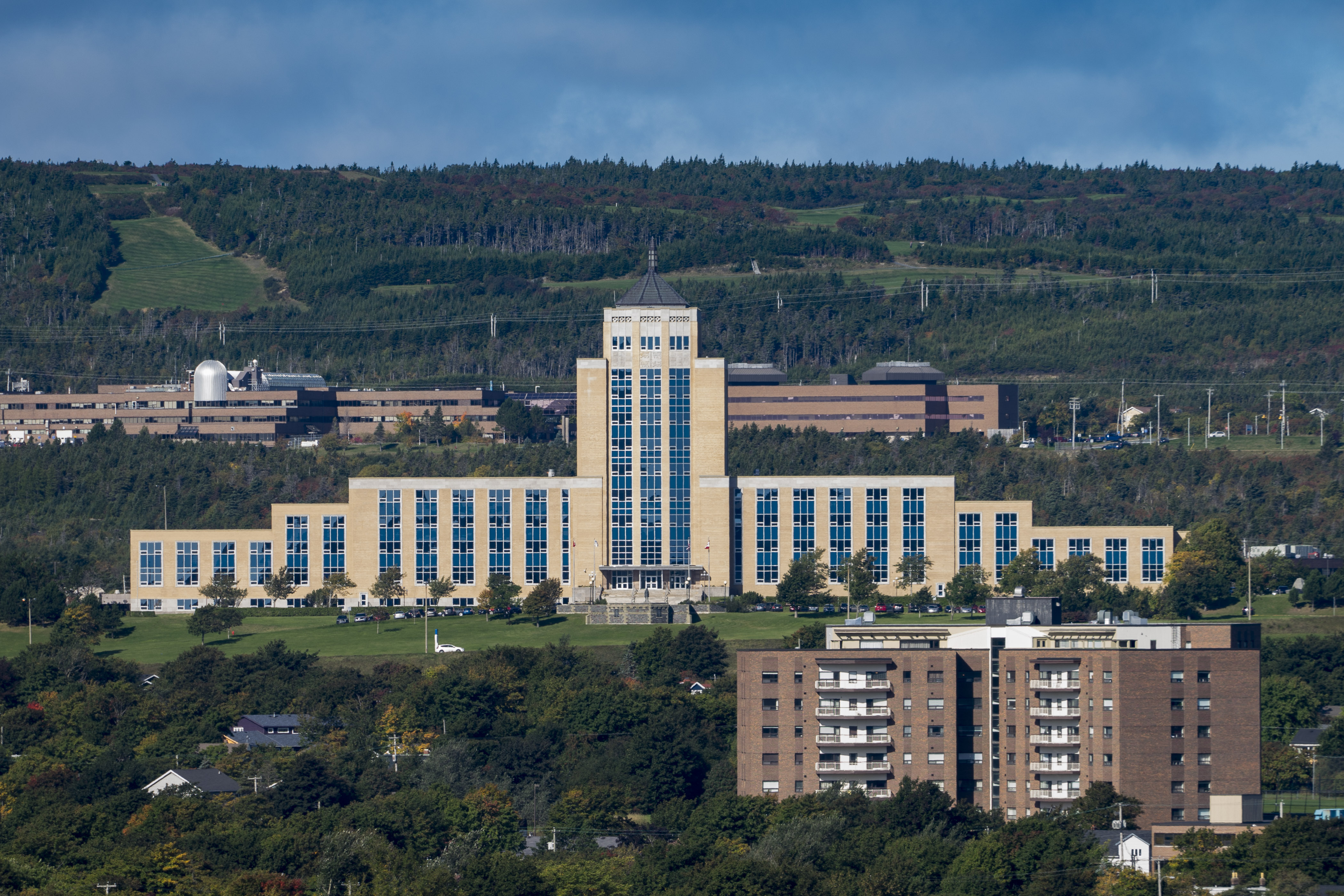
- Colonial Building (1850–1959); Confederation Building (1959–present)

The General Assembly of Newfoundland and Labrador (known as the General Assembly of Newfoundland until 6 December 2001) is the legislature of the province of Newfoundland and Labrador, Canada. Today, the legislature is made of two elements: the lieutenant governor (representing the King of Canada), and the unicameral assembly called the Newfoundland and Labrador House of Assembly. The legislature was first established in 1832.

Like the Canadian federal government, Newfoundland and Labrador uses a Westminster-style parliamentary government, in which members are sent to the House of Assembly after general elections. The leader of the party with the most seats is called upon by the lieutenant governor of Newfoundland and Labrador to form a government and assume the position of Premier of Newfoundland and Labrador and Executive Council of Newfoundland and Labrador. The premier acts as Newfoundland and Labrador's head of government, while the King of Canada is head of state.

The legislature was originally bicameral. From 1832 to 1934, it had an upper house called the Legislative Council of Newfoundland. That house was abolished in 1934.

Between 1934 and Newfoundland's entry into Canadian Confederation in 1949, Newfoundland was under Commission of Government, and the General Assembly was suspended.

== List of General Assemblies ==
=== Pre-Confederation ===
Assembly	Period	Election	Dissolution
1st General Assembly of Newfoundland	1833–1838	1832	
2nd General Assembly of Newfoundland	1838–1843	1836, (Note: The results of the 1836 election were set aside by the chief justice of Newfoundland, after he discovered some of the writs had not been marked with the official seal.) 1837	
3rd General Assembly of Newfoundland	1843–1848	1842	
4th General Assembly of Newfoundland	1848–1853	1848	
5th General Assembly of Newfoundland	1853–1855	1852	
6th General Assembly of Newfoundland	1855–1860	1855	
7th General Assembly of Newfoundland	1860–1861	1859	
8th General Assembly of Newfoundland	1861–1865	1861	
9th General Assembly of Newfoundland	1865–1869	1865	
10th General Assembly of Newfoundland	1869–1873	1869	
11th General Assembly of Newfoundland	1873–1874	1873	
12th General Assembly of Newfoundland	1874–1878	1874	
13th General Assembly of Newfoundland	1878–1882	1878	
14th General Assembly of Newfoundland	1882–1885	1882	
15th General Assembly of Newfoundland	1885–1889	1885	
16th General Assembly of Newfoundland	1889–1893	1889	
17th General Assembly of Newfoundland	1893–1897	1893	
18th General Assembly of Newfoundland	1897–1900	1897	
19th General Assembly of Newfoundland	1900–1904	1900	
20th General Assembly of Newfoundland	1904–1908	1904	
21st General Assembly of Newfoundland	1908–1909	1908	
22nd General Assembly of Newfoundland	1909–1913	1909	
23rd General Assembly of Newfoundland	1913–1919	1913	
24th General Assembly of Newfoundland	1919–1923	1919	
25th General Assembly of Newfoundland	1923–1924	1923	
26th General Assembly of Newfoundland	1924–1928	1924	
27th General Assembly of Newfoundland	1928–1932	1928	
28th General Assembly of Newfoundland	1932–1934	1932	

=== Interregnum ===
Body	Period
Commission of Government	1934-1949
National Convention	1946-1949

=== Post-Confederation ===
Assembly	Period	Election	Initial meeting – Dissolution
29th General Assembly of Newfoundland	1949–1951	1949	July 11, 1949 – November 3, 1951
30th General Assembly of Newfoundland	1951–1956	1951	March 11, 1952 – September 10, 1956
31st General Assembly of Newfoundland	1956–1959	1956	March 19, 1957 – July 28, 1959
32nd General Assembly of Newfoundland	1959–1962	1959	April 20, 1960 – October 23, 1962
33rd General Assembly of Newfoundland	1962–1966	1962	March 20, 1963 – August 17, 1966
34th General Assembly of Newfoundland	1966–1971	1966	November 30, 1966 – October 4, 1971
35th General Assembly of Newfoundland	1971–1972	1971	March 1, 1972 – March 1, 1972
36th General Assembly of Newfoundland	1972–1975	1972	April 19, 1972 – June 25, 1975
37th General Assembly of Newfoundland	1975–1979	1975	November 19, 1975 – May 25, 1979
38th General Assembly of Newfoundland	1979–1982	1979	July 12, 1979 – March 15, 1982
39th General Assembly of Newfoundland	1982–1985	1982	May 10, 1982 – March 11, 1985
40th General Assembly of Newfoundland	1985–1989	1985	April 25, 1985 – March 29, 1989
41st General Assembly of Newfoundland	1989–1993	1989	May 25, 1989 – April 5, 1993
42nd General Assembly of Newfoundland	1993–1996	1993	May 20, 1993 – January 29, 1996
43rd General Assembly of Newfoundland	1996–1999	1996	March 20, 1996 – January 18, 1999
44th General Assembly of Newfoundland and Labrador	1999–2003	1999	March 16, 1999 – September 29, 2003
45th General Assembly of Newfoundland and Labrador	2003–2007	2003	March 18, 2004 – September 17, 2007
46th General Assembly of Newfoundland and Labrador	2007–2011	2007	November 1, 2007 – September 19, 2011
47th General Assembly of Newfoundland and Labrador	2011–2015	2011	October 27, 2011 – November 5, 2015
48th General Assembly of Newfoundland and Labrador	2015–2019	2015	December 18, 2015 – April 17, 2019
49th General Assembly of Newfoundland and Labrador	2019–2021	2019	June 10, 2019 – January 15, 2021
50th General Assembly of Newfoundland and Labrador	2021–2025	2021	April 12, 2021 – September 15, 2025
51st General Assembly of Newfoundland and Labrador	2025–present	2025	November 3, 2025 – present
