= John Boone =

John Boone may refer to:

- John D. Boon (1817–1864), American merchant and politician
- John H. Boone (1848–1884), lawyer and politician in Newfoundland
- John William "Blind" Boone (1864–1927), American musician and composer
- John Boone, fictional character in the Mars trilogy by Kim Stanley Robinson
