= James Johnstone Rogerson =

Newfoundland politician (1820–1907)

The Honourable James J. Rogerson MHA
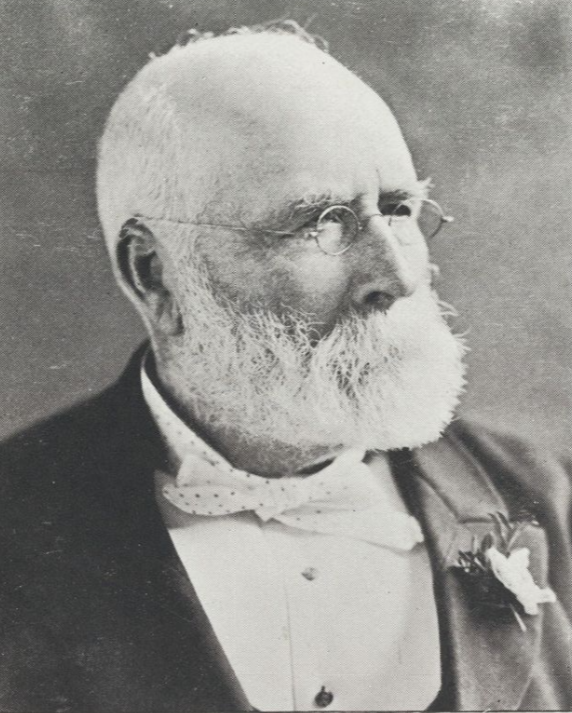
- Rogerson in 1894

Member of the Newfoundland House of Assembly for Burin
- In office November 9, 1878 – November 6, 1882 Serving with James Winter
- Preceded by: Charles R. Ayre
- Succeeded by: John E. Peters
- In office November 7, 1859 – May 2, 1861 Serving with Ambrose Shea
- Preceded by: Patrick Morris; Clement Benning
- Succeeded by: Edward Evans; Hugh Hoyles

Member of the Newfoundland House of Assembly for Bay de Verde
- In office April 5, 1870 – November 9, 1878
- Preceded by: John Bemister
- Succeeded by: Alfred Penney

Member of the Legislative Council of Newfoundland
- In office June 13, 1855 – November 7, 1859
- Nominated by: Philip Little
- Appointed by: Sir Charles Darling

Personal details
- Born: James Johnstone Rogerson; March 21, 1820 Harbour Grace, Newfoundland Colony
- Died: October 17, 1907 (aged 87) St. John's, Newfoundland
- Party: Liberal (1859–1861); Conservative (1870–1882); New (1882)
- Spouse(s): Emma Garrett Blaikie (m. 1845–1878) Isabella Whiteford (m. 1879)
- Children: 7, including William Rogerson
- Relatives: A. J. W. McNeilly (son-in-law)
- Occupation: Businessman

James Johnstone Rogerson (March 21, 1820 – October 17, 1907) was a Newfoundland businessman, political figure and philanthropist. He represented Burin from 1859 to 1861 and 1878 to 1882 and Bay de Verde from 1870 to 1882 in the Newfoundland House of Assembly.

== Background ==
Rogerson was born in Harbour Grace as the son of Peter Rogerson and Amelia (née Palmer). The Rogerson family were from Johnstonebridge in Dumfriesshire, Scotland. After receiving a basic education in Harbour Grace and apprenticing with the Scottish firm of Green and Hunter in St. John's, Rogerson joined his father's firm in 1841, which became Peter Rogerson and Son. The Rogersons were primarily involved in the general trade of shipping fishery supplies, but they also financed vessels for the seal fishery. The family also provided free transport for Methodist missionaries to Newfoundland. As he came of age, Rogerson expanded the family business to encourage domestic industry, investing in agriculture and mineral exploration alongside Stephen Rendell. He also established the Colonial Cordage Company and the Boot and Shoe Company, both in St. John's.

== Politics ==
Rogerson entered public life as an early member of the Newfoundland Natives' Society and as an advocate of the temperance movement. In 1855, Rogerson was appointed to the Legislative Council of Newfoundland. He was then named to the Executive Council by Premier Philip Little in 1857. Rogerson subsequently ran for the House of Assembly as a supporter of Little, and he narrowly won a contest in Burin during the 1859 general election. He did not run for reelection in 1861, but he was elected again in an 1870 by-election for Bay de Verde held after John Bemister resigned to accept a position as sheriff. Rogerson was appointed Receiver General in 1874 as a member of the Executive Council of Frederick Carter. He returned to representing the district of Burin when William Whiteway came to power in 1878.

Rogerson broke with Whiteway in 1882 over financial matters, particularly regarding the expense of the Newfoundland Railway. With the support of St. John's merchants, he formed the New Party alongside Walter B. Grieve as the opposition to Whiteway in that year's general election. Rogerson and most of the party's candidates were defeated amidst broad public support for Whiteway's policies. In recognition of his public service, Queen Victoria granted him the title of Honourable for life.

== Philanthropy and family ==
After he retired from politics, he was active in the Temperance Society. In 1886, Rogerson established a home for fishermen and sailors. He and his wife also founded an agency to help workers find employment in the winter. He supported the education of poor children and juveniles in Her Majesty's Penitentiary and directed literacy programs for people living in remote locations on the island.

Rogerson was married twice. He first married Emma Garrett Blaikie on January 21, 1845, with whom he had seven children. Following her death, he remarried to Isabella Whiteford in 1879, who would become a renowned local poet. Among his children were William Rogerson, who would also serve in the House of Assembly, and Jessie Emma Rogerson, who married A. J. W. McNeilly.

Rogerson died in St. John's on October 17, 1907.
