= Richard MacDonnell =

Richard MacDonnell may refer to:

- Richard Graves MacDonnell (1814–1881), Anglo-Irish lawyer, judge and colonial governor
- Richard MacDonnell (scholar) (1787–1867), 29th Provost of Trinity College, Dublin
- Richard MacDonnell (Newfoundland politician) (1841–1928), Irish-born businessman and politician in Newfoundland
