= John Henry Warren =

Newfoundland politician

The Honourable John Henry Warren
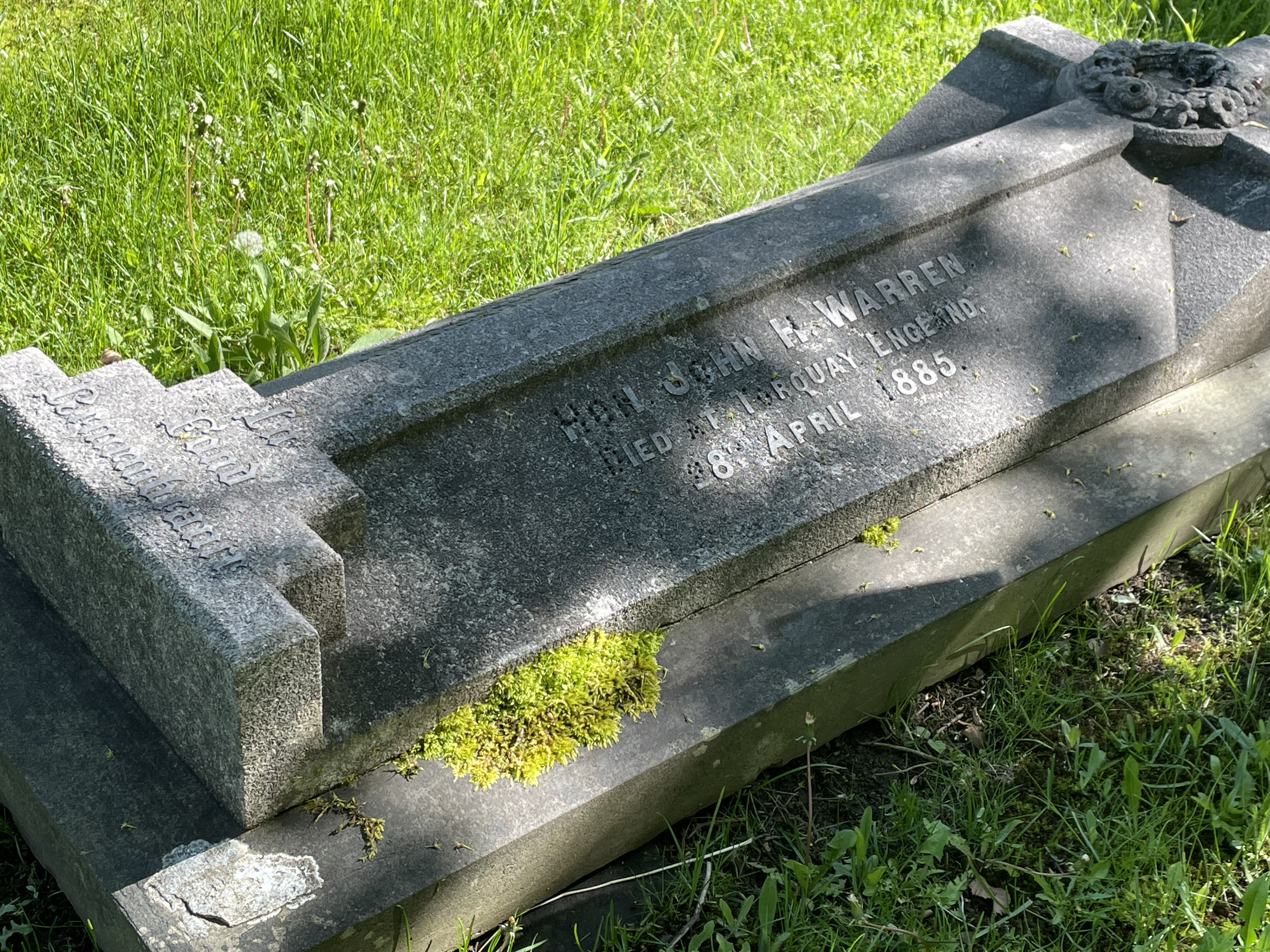
- Warren's grave in 2024

Member of the House of Assembly for Bonavista Bay
- In office 1852–1869 Serving with Robert Carter (1855–1859); Matthew W. Walbank (1855–1864); Stephen March (1859–1865); Frederick J. Wyatt (1864–1865); John T. Oakley (1865–1869); John T. Burton (1865–1869)
- Preceded by: Robert Carter (Note: As a single member district)
- Succeeded by: James L. Noonan; Francis Winton; William M. Barnes
- In office 1874–1878 Serving with Charles R. Bowring and A. J. W. McNeilly
- Preceded by: John T. Burton; Charles R. Bowring; A. J. W. McNeilly
- Succeeded by: James Saint; George Skelton; Francis Winton

Member of the House of Assembly for Trinity Bay
- In office 1870–1874 Serving with Stephen Rendell (1870–1873); Thomas H. Ridley (1870–1871); Alexander Graham (1871–1874); John Steer (1873–1874); William Whiteway (1873–1874)
- Preceded by: Robert Alsop (Note: By-election)
- Succeeded by: John Steer; William Whiteway; James H. Watson

Chairman of the Board of Works
- In office 1861–1865
- Appointed by: Hugh Hoyles

Surveyor General
- In office 1861–1865
- Appointed by: Hugh Hoyles
- In office 1874–1878
- Appointed by: Frederick Carter

Member of the Legislative Council
- In office January 13, 1879 – April 28, 1885
- Appointed by: William Whiteway

Personal details
- Born: c. 1812 Devon, England
- Died: April 28, 1885 Torquay, England
- Party: Conservative
- Relations: Charles R. Bowring (son-in-law)

John Henry Warren (ca 1812 – April 28, 1885) was an English-born merchant and politician in Newfoundland. He represented Bonavista Bay from 1852 to 1869 and from 1874 to 1878; and Trinity Bay from 1870 to 1874 in the Newfoundland and Labrador House of Assembly. He was born in Devon, the son of William Warren, and is known to have been operating with a partner in the fish and wholesale-retail trade in St. John's in the 1830s. In 1841, he established his own business. Warren served in the Executive Council as surveyor general and chairman of the Board of Works. He was defeated in the 1878 general election and was named to the Legislative Council in 1879. He died at Belgrave Terrace, Torquay in England in 1885 while still a member of the council.

His daughter Laura married Charles R. Bowring who also served in the assembly and Legislative Council.
