= Abram Kean =

Newfoundland sealing captain and politician (1855–1943)

Captain Abram Kean MLC MHA
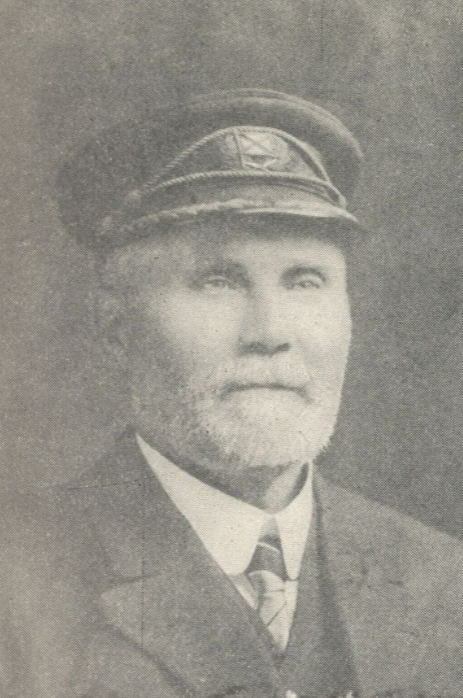
- Abram Kean c. 1927

Member of the Legislative Council of Newfoundland
- In office May 10, 1927 – February 16, 1934
- Nominated by: Walter Monroe
- Appointed by: William Allardyce

Member of the Newfoundland House of Assembly for Bay de Verde
- In office October 28, 1897 – November 8, 1900 Serving with William Rogerson
- Preceded by: Sydney Woods; John B. Ayre
- Succeeded by: Henry Woods; Michael T. Knight

Member of the Newfoundland House of Assembly for Bonavista Bay
- In office October 31, 1885 – November 10, 1888 Serving with James L. Noonan (1885–1886); Frederick White (1885–1889); Alfred B. Morine (1886–1889)
- Preceded by: George Skelton; Francis Winton
- Succeeded by: Donald Morison

Personal details
- Born: July 8, 1855 Flowers Island, Newfoundland Colony
- Died: May 18, 1945 (aged 89) St. John's, Newfoundland
- Party: Reform (1885–1889); Conservative (1897–1900); People's (1919)
- Spouse: Caroline Yetman (m. 1872)
- Children: 8, including Westbury
- Occupation: Sealing captain
- Known for: Role in the 1914 SS Newfoundland sealing disaster

Abram Kean (July 8, 1855 – May 18, 1945) was a Newfoundland sealing captain and politician. He was a renowned sealer who captured over a million pelts during his career. Kean is most famous for his role in the 1914 SS Newfoundland sealing disaster.

Born in Flowers Island, Kean embarked upon a career in the Newfoundland cod fishery at the age of 18, but quickly shifted his interests to the seal fishery. He was twice elected to the Newfoundland House of Assembly in 1885 and 1897, and he briefly served as the acting Minister of Marine and Fisheries under Premier James S. Winter.

Although Kean's career on the ice was remarkably successful, it also came with controversy. His crews were accused of stealing seal pelts from other vessels during the 1898 SS Greenland disaster. In 1914, Kean, as the master of the SS Stephano, ordered 132 wayward sealers from the SS Newfoundland to finish the seal hunt and return to their vessel despite an ongoing storm. Kean was acquitted of responsibility by a government inquiry, but his reputation was greatly damaged.

After an attempted return to the House of Assembly in 1919, Kean was appointed to the Legislative Council of Newfoundland in 1927, where he served until it was abolished in favour of a commission of government. He retired from the seal fishery in 1936 before dying in St. John's in 1945.

== Early life ==
Abram Kean was born on July 8, 1855, in the small community of Flower's Island in Newfoundland. Kean was the youngest son of Joseph and Jane Kean. Growing up in such a small town and community, Kean was deprived, like many children in Flower's Island, of knowing the importance of education and schooling. However, on May 1, 1863, Kean was sent to Pool's Island, a town six miles (10 km) away to attend school. He was the first child in his family to be sent to school in order to get a proper education. While on Pools Island, Kean lived with his uncle with whom he developed a strong friendship. After four years of schooling, Kean returned home on May 1, 1867.

When Kean was twelve, his mother caught tuberculosis, devastating the entire family. Kean was the only literate child, so he read to her to alleviate her suffering. Kean had a close relationship with both of his parents, which intensified the impact of his mother's sickness. Jane Kean died at 54 years of age.

After the death of his mother, Kean's father, Joseph, retired and bestowed fishing schooners upon each of his sons. In 1871 at the age of 17, Kean met his wife Caroline Yetman who his father had hired as a housekeeper shortly after the death of his wife. Abram and Caroline were married on October 19, 1872, in Greenspond. Eleven months after their marriage, their first son, Joseph W.Keane, was born. The couple had six sons and two daughters.

== Early marine career ==
Kean's career started off in the cod fishery but shortly after he began to focus more of his attention to the seal fishing industry. On March 1, 1872, Kean participated for the first time in the sealing season and set off as a member of a crew of 70 men. He sailed for three years as a common man before his promotion to master of watch and then later to second-in-command on his brother Edgar's vessel. After ten years of seal hunting, he felt ready to occupy the position of captain. In 1882, Kean was accepted by Baine Johnson, a Scottish merchant living in St. John's, Newfoundland for the captaincy of a brigantine named Hannie & Bennie. He commanded this ship during the 1883 and 1884 sealing seasons.

Subsequently, he sent a request to St. John's merchant Moses Monroe asking to captain the SS Esquimaux. His request was initially refused by Monroe with the proposal that Kean spend the following two sealing seasons as bridge master under Captain Joe Barbour on the SS Esquimaux. Finally, Monroe concluded that Kean had acquired sufficient experience to captain the vessel.

On January 1, 1889, Kean navigated through the ice as captain of the SS Wolf. From 1889 until 1895, Kean killed a large quantity of seals. In previous seasons, he averaged 155 seal pelts per day. On the SS Wolf, his average number of pelts increased to 579 per day.

In 1897, Kean captained the SS Hope, on which his numbers were the same as on the SS Wolf. In 1898, he took charge of the SS Aurora. He averaged 204 seal pelts per day on this vessel. In 1910 and 1916, Kean captured more pelts than any other vessel, setting the record for the greatest quantity of pelts harvested during a single season. This record was held until 1933.

== Role in 1914 Sealing Disaster ==
On March 31, 1914, a group of sealing vessels left St John's including the SS Stephano, captained by Abram Kean and the SS Newfoundland, captained by his son, Westbury Kean. They had arranged to notify each other if a patch of seals was spotted so the other person's crew could be included in the hunt.

At 7 am on March 31, Abram Kean signaled that seals had been spotted. Accordingly, Westbury Kean's crew was sent 7 to 8 miles (11 to 13 km) to the Stephano to meet with Abram Kean, expecting to stay the night aboard Stephano. On the Stephano the crew was fed and then ordered back onto the ice, sent two miles (3.2 km) back in the direction from which they had come to the seal patch, despite signs of worsening weather. Kean had dropped the crew more southeast than what would have been ideal, forcing the sealers to travel away from their vessel to find the patch. Kean stated that he believed that they would be able to complete the task and return to the SS Newfoundland.

Upon dropping off the crew from the Stefano, Abram Kean headed away to retrieve his own crew. By 1:30pm, a blizzard had begun and was in full effect. Abram Kean spent the day retrieving his own men and their equipment, while heading back toward the SS Newfoundland, which had only sounded its emergency whistle twice that night, because its captain, Westbury Kean was sure his crew was safe on the Stephano.

Abram Kean had left the Newfoundland's crew with the belief that they would get their kill for the day and return to their own ship with ease, as he had been under the impression from his lookout that the Newfoundland was closer than it actually was. Meanwhile, Westbury Kean was under the impression that his crew was safe on his father's ship, the Stephano. By the third day it was evident that the two captains had been wrong, and 78 of 132 men had either drowned or died from overexposure.

Abram Kean was blamed for the disaster for several reasons. The first of these being his involvement in a similar Greenland incident in 1898, wherein he was accused of stealing the seal pans which caused the sealers to have to return to the ice when a blizzard hit. Also, Abram showed little grief after the event, being more concerned with retrieving pelts than the fate of the men. Additionally, he discarded the fact that there were signs of bad weather such as light snow fall, a southeast wind and a dropping barometer. It was also brought up that Kean's boat had gotten a message to take care of the Newfoundland's crew, but he had misunderstood this message.

The Majority Report of the Commission of Enquiry partially agreed that the fault lay with Abram Kean, though the Minority Report persuaded the Commission that the fault was not with Kean's and the disaster was inevitable. One Commission Enquiry report mentions that upon the acceptance of the SS Newfoundland's crew onto his own ship, Kean should have treated them like his own, while another points out that his signal to the SS Newfoundland was to help and he had no obligation to its men.

Judge Johnson ruled that the situation was an act of God, and therefore inevitable. Abram Kean was found not guilty. The ruling concluded that the disaster was unavoidable and that it was an extraordinary occurrence which is unlikely to happen again in the future. Abram Kean was not convicted of any felonies or held responsible in any way, legally, for the deaths of the 78 men on March 31, 1914.

A second disaster occurred during the same storm in which the SS Southern Cross sank with all hands. The total loss from all three sealing ships totaled over 250 lives and the collective tragedy became known as the "1914 Newfoundland Sealing Disaster".

== Marine career post-sealing disaster ==
Nearly three thousand people demanded that Kean should be arrested and serve jail time because of the fatal error he made during the sealing disaster. Kean was not necessarily punished for his doings, although, he did suffer from unprecedented criticism for his decision made on the ice. Shortly after the sealing disaster, a relief fund was put in place to aid the families and survivors involved in the incident. The impact of this disaster was severe on both the people who participated in the seal fishery and those who did not. Additionally, many sealers chose not to return to the ice on Kean's vessel. Contrary to the wishes of many crew members, Kean returned to the ice and captained the SS Prospero during the following season, which he continually captained until 1920.

Kean remained involved in the seal fishery and captained several ships. During the 1934 season, he captained the SS Beothic. His crew captured over 48,000 pelts, therefore making Kean's career seal quota exceed 1 million pelts. In the weeks upon returning to port, he received the Order of the British Empire and a medal from the Bowring Brothers. During the summer of 1934, he was appointed as a fisheries officer on the Labrador Coast. In subsequent years, Kean participated in only two additional sealing seasons, the final at the age of 80. Kean participated in 48 sealing seasons, with 36 years as a captain. His crews captured a combined total of 1,052,737 seals.

On February 23, 1918, Kean lost his eldest son, Joseph, while at sea. He mentions in his autobiography, Old and Young Ahead, written in 1935, that his son's death filled him with grief:

I looked at it from every angle, but insurmountable difficulties seemed to be blocking the way. One thing I could not afford to do: I could not afford to be a coward.

Kean ran in the 1919 Newfoundland general election for the district of St. Barbe and was defeated by J. H. Scammell in his first electoral loss. It is said that Kean's role in the sealing disaster of 1914 caused difficulty among voters. In 1927, he was appointed to the Legislative Council of Newfoundland, and subsequently to the upper house until its abolition in 1934. During this time, Kean served as acting minister of the marine and fisheries, playing a significant role in Newfoundland legislation.

In 1937, Maclean's magazine wrote an article on Kean, praising him for his accomplishments while participating in the seal fishery. Between 1936 and his death in 1945, Kean wrote letters to political figures of both Newfoundland and Canada, in which he showed a favorable viewpoint on Newfoundland with respect to the Canadian Confederation. To date, Newfoundlanders are very aware of the horrific sealing disaster of 1914. The present-day population of Newfoundland has a wide range of both positive and negative opinions concerning Kean. There are plans to place a memorial in Elliston to commemorate the men and families involved in the disaster of 1914.

== Ships captained ==
- SS Aurora
- SS Beothic
- SS Esquimaux
- SS Hope
- SS Meigle
- SS Prospero
- SS Stephano
- SS Terra Nova
- SS Viking
- SS Wolf

== Sources ==
- Bornath, LM. "Abram Kean". Famous, Should Be Famous, and Infamous Canadians. 11 May 2003. Web. Accessed on 2 March 2013.
- England, George. The Greatest Hunt in the World. Montreal: Tundra Books, 1969. Print.
- Hanrahan, Maura. Rogues and Heroes of the Island of Newfoundland. St. John's: Flanker Press, 2005. Print.
- Hogan, Peter. The Disaster Spring: Politics of the Newfoundland Seal Fishery, 1908–1919. Diss. Honors. Memorial University of Newfoundland, 2008. Print.
- "Kean, Abram". Society, Dorcas. Encyclopedia of Newfoundland and Labrador. Third Edition. St. John's: Harry Cuff Publications Ltd, 1991. 156–157. Print.
- Kean, Abram. Old and Young Ahead. London: Heath, Cranton, 1935. Print.
- Macdonald, Joseph. I Just Didn't Want to Die. Toronto: Arbeiter Ring Publishing, 1991. Print.
- Mullaly, Kris. Abram Kean: Newfoundland's Most Famous Sealing Captain. St. John's: Boulder Publications, 1999. Print.
- Newfoundland, Government of. Commission of Enquiry into the Sealing Disaster of 1914. St. John's: Government of Newfoundland, 1915. Print.
- Newfoundland. Magisterial Enquiry into the SS Newfoundland Disaster Enquiry. St. John's: Government of Newfoundland, 1915. Print.
