= George A. Hutchings =

Newfoundland politician (1843–1920)

George A. Hutchings MHA
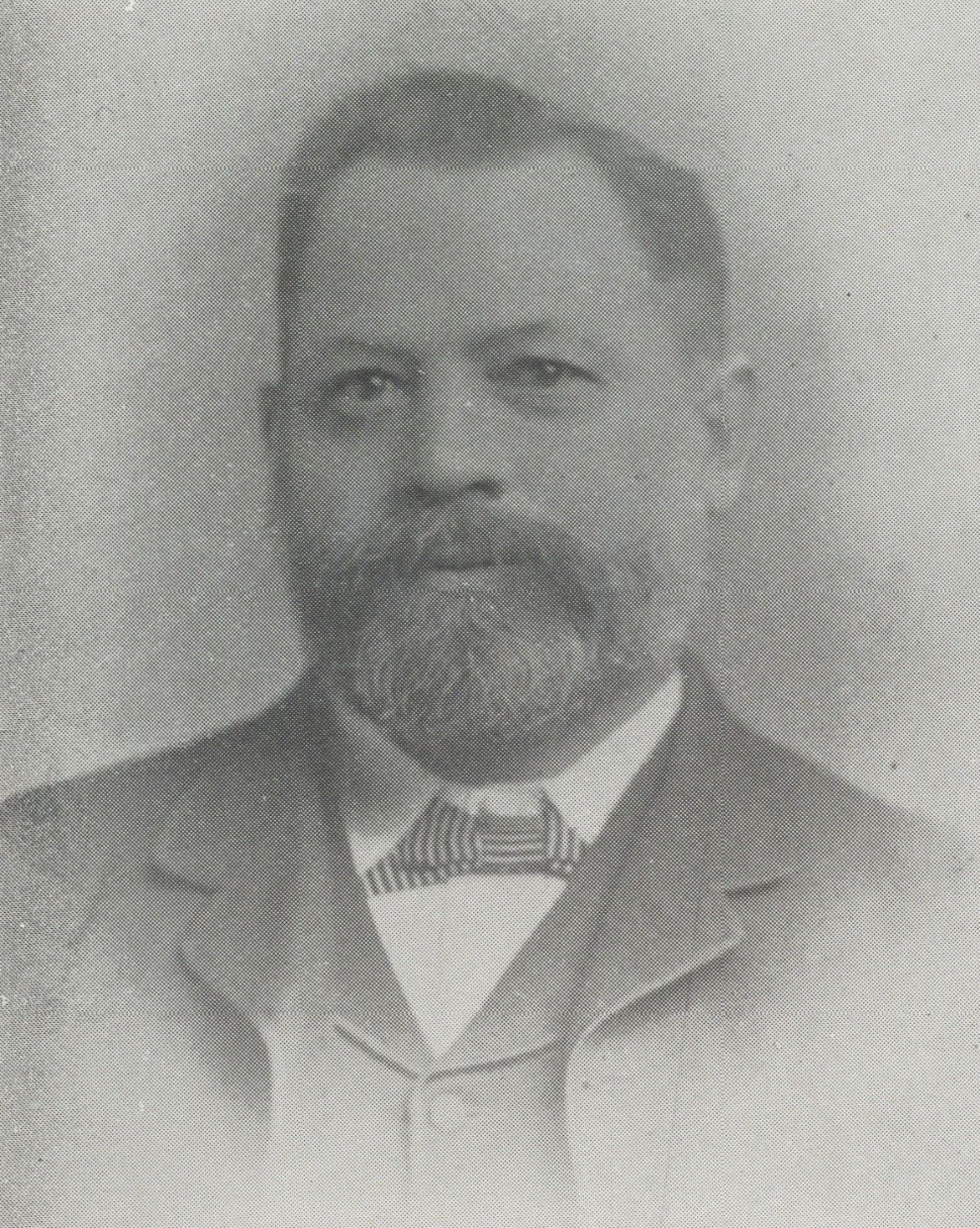
- Hutchings in 1894

Member of the Newfoundland House of Assembly for Port de Grave
- In office October 31, 1885 – November 6, 1889
- Preceded by: John Bartlett
- Succeeded by: James A. Clift

Personal details
- Born: November 23, 1843 St. John's, Newfoundland Colony
- Died: December 28, 1920 (aged 77) St. John's, Newfoundland
- Party: Reform
- Spouse: Elizabeth Scybella Bridge (m. 1873)
- Occupation: Merchant

George Adolphus Hutchings (November 23, 1843 – December 28, 1920) was a merchant and politician in Newfoundland. As a member of the Reform Party supporting Premier Robert Thorburn, he represented Port de Grave in the Newfoundland House of Assembly from 1885 to 1889.

== Business career and politics ==
Hutchings was born in St. John's and was educated there. Around 1859, he began working as a junior clerk with C.F. Bennett and Company owned by eventual Premier Charles Fox Bennett. In 1879, Hutchings became manager at Job Brothers and Company, succeeding Stephen Rendell.

Hutchings entered politics when he successfully ran as the Reform Party's candidate for the district of Port de Grave in the 1885 election. He served only one term in the House of Assembly before choosing not to run for re-election in 1889.

By 1894, he had become president of the St. John's Floating Dry Dock Company. He also served as a director for several companies, including the Commercial Bank, Consolidated Iron Foundry Company, the Boot and Shoe Factory, and the Nail Factory.

Hutchings died in St. John's on December 28, 1920.
