= James L. Noonan =

Newfoundland politician (1823–1898)

The Honourable James L. Noonan MHA

Receiver General
- In office 1885–1886
- Premier: Robert Thorburn
- Preceded by: William J. S. Donnelly
- Succeeded by: William J. S. Donnelly

Colonial Secretary
- In office 1871–1873
- Premier: Charles Fox Bennett
- Preceded by: Robert Alsop
- Succeeded by: Edward D. Shea

Member of the Newfoundland House of Assembly for Bonavista Bay
- In office February 26, 1883 – June 12, 1886 Serving with George Skelton (1883–1885); Francis Winton (1883–1885); Abram Kean (1885–1886); Frederick White (1885–1886)
- Preceded by: Walter B. Grieve
- Succeeded by: Alfred B. Morine
- In office November 13, 1869 – November 8, 1873 Serving with William M. Barnes and Francis Winton
- Preceded by: John T. Burton; John T. Oakley; John H. Warren
- Succeeded by: Charles R. Bowring; John T. Burton; A. J. W. McNeilly

Personal details
- Born: James Lyons Noonan c. 1823 Pictou, Nova Scotia
- Died: December 19, 1898 (aged 74–75) St. John's, Newfoundland Colony
- Party: Anti-Confederation (1869–1873); New (1882–1885); Reform (1885–1886)
- Occupation: Merchant

James Lyons Noonan (1823 – December 19, 1898) was a merchant and political figure in Newfoundland. He represented Bonavista Bay in the Newfoundland and Labrador House of Assembly from 1869 to 1873 and from 1883 to 1886 as an Anti-Confederate and then Conservative.

Originally from Pictou, Nova Scotia, Noonan established himself in business at Greenspond, Bonavista Bay, Newfoundland. He was colonial secretary from 1871 to 1873 and receiver general from 1885 to 1886. Noonan was defeated when he ran for reelection in 1873. In 1882, he was defeated by Walter B. Grieve; Grieve's election was overturned and Noonan was declared elected in 1883. Noonan was forced to run for reelection after he was named to the Executive Council in 1885; he was defeated by Alfred B. Morine in 1886. Later that year, he was named assistant collector of customs at St. John's. He died there in 1898.
