= Prescott Emerson =

Newfoundland politician

The Honourable Prescott Emerson MHA

10th Speaker of the Newfoundland House of Assembly
- In office February 4, 1875 – February 1, 1877
- Preceded by: Thomas R. Bennett
- Succeeded by: James S. Winter

Member of the Newfoundland House of Assembly for Burgeo-La Poile
- In office November 13, 1869 – November 9, 1878
- Preceded by: Daniel Woodley Prowse
- Succeeded by: Alexander McLellan Mackay

Personal details
- Born: Prescott Emerson; 1840 St. John's, Newfoundland Colony
- Died: February 3, 1889 (aged 48–49) St. John's, Newfoundland Colony
- Party: Conservative
- Relatives: Charles Emerson (nephew)
- Occupation: Lawyer

Prescott Emerson (1840 – February 3, 1889) was a lawyer and political figure in Newfoundland. He represented Burgeo-LaPoile in the Newfoundland and Labrador House of Assembly from 1869 to 1878.

He was born in St. John's, the son of George Henry Emerson. Emerson was called to the bar in 1864. He supported union with Canada. Emerson served as speaker for the assembly from 1874 to 1878. In 1878, he retired from politics and was named chief clerk and registrar for the Supreme Court, serving until his death in 1889.
