= George Henry Emerson (speaker) =

Newfoundland politician (1853–1916)

The Honourable George Henry Emerson MHA MLC QC
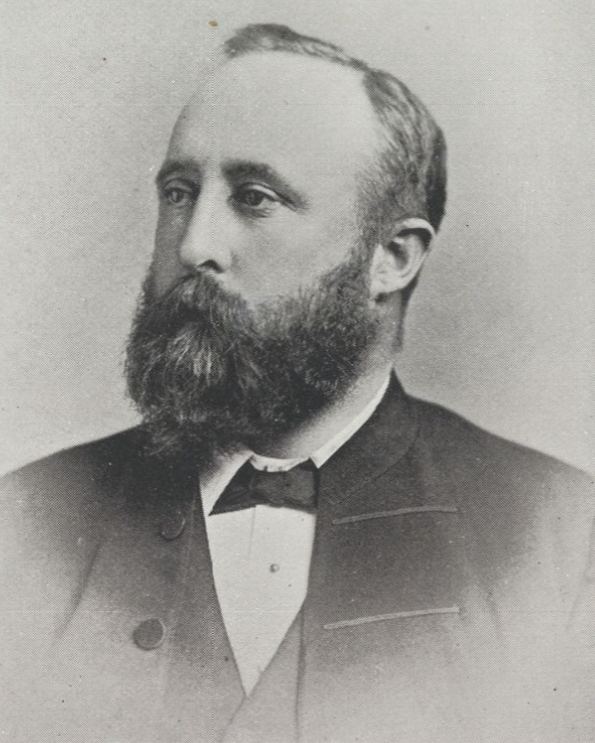
- Emerson in 1894

15th Speaker of the Newfoundland House of Assembly
- In office 1889 – April 11, 1894
- Premier: William Whiteway
- Preceded by: A. J. W. McNeilly
- Succeeded by: Lawrence O'Brien Furlong

Member of the Legislative Council of Newfoundland
- In office 1895–1896
- Appointed by: William Whiteway

Member of the Newfoundland House of Assembly for Placentia and St. Mary's
- In office October 31, 1885 – November 10, 1894 Serving with William J. S. Donnelly (1885–1889, 1893–1894); James F. McGrath (1885–1894); Richard H. O'Dwyer (1889–1893)
- Preceded by: Albert Bradshaw; Michael Tobin
- Succeeded by: John T. Dunphy; Richard T. McGrath; Michael Tobin

Personal details
- Born: September 24, 1853 Harbour Grace, Newfoundland Colony
- Died: March 6, 1916 (aged 62) St. John's, Newfoundland
- Party: Liberal
- Children: Lewis Edward Emerson
- Relatives: George Henry Emerson (grandfather); Prescott Emerson (uncle)
- Occupation: Lawyer

George Henry Emerson (September 24, 1853 – March 6, 1916) was a lawyer, judge and political figure in the Colony of Newfoundland. He represented Placentia and St. Mary's in the Newfoundland and Labrador House of Assembly from 1885 to 1894 as a Liberal.

He was born in Harbour Grace, Newfoundland Colony. Emerson articled in law with his uncle Prescott Emerson and others and was called to the bar in 1877. Emerson was speaker for the Newfoundland assembly from 1889 to 1894 when he was unseated by petition. He served in the Legislative Council from 1895 to 1896, when he resigned his seat after being named to the Supreme Court of Newfoundland and Labrador. He served until his death in St. John's in 1916 at the age of 62.

Emerson was the father of Lewis Edward Emerson who also served in the assembly and became the province's first Chief Justice.
