= John Bartlett (Newfoundland politician) =

Newfoundland sea captain and politician (1841–1925)

Captain John Bartlett MHA
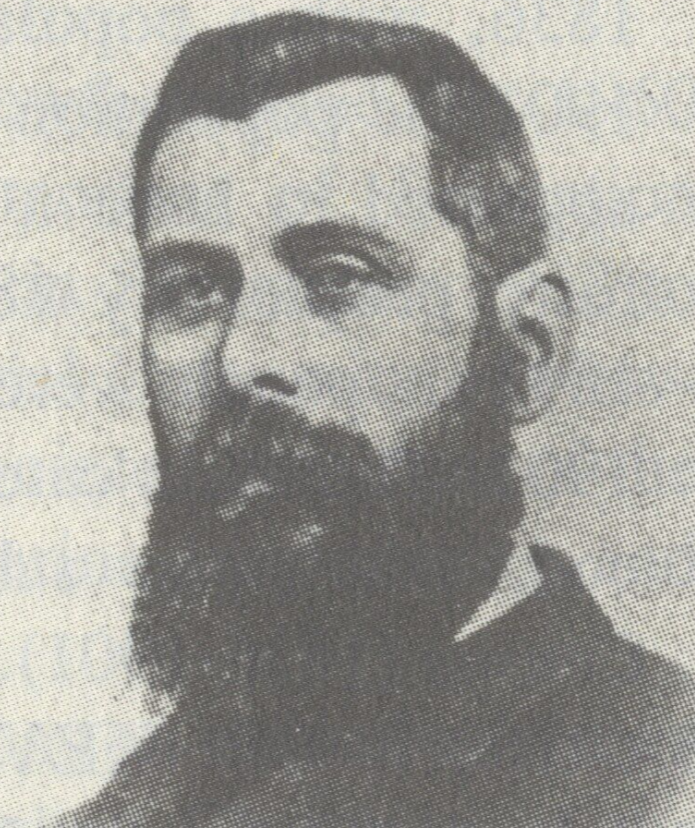

Member of the Newfoundland House of Assembly for Port de Grave
- In office November 6, 1882 – October 31, 1885
- Preceded by: Nathan Norman
- Succeeded by: George A. Hutchings
- In office November 8, 1873 – November 7, 1874
- Preceded by: James B. Woods
- Succeeded by: Nathaniel Rabbitts

Personal details
- Born: c. 1841 Brigus, Newfoundland Colony
- Died: July 15, 1925 (aged 74–75) Brigus, Newfoundland
- Party: Anti-Confederation (1873–74); Independent (1882–85)
- Relatives: Robert Bartlett (nephew)
- Occupation: Sealing captain

John Bartlett (c. 1841 – July 15, 1925) was a Newfoundland mariner and politician. He represented Port de Grave in the Newfoundland House of Assembly from 1873 to 1874 and from 1882 to 1886.

== Sailing career ==
John Bartlett was born in Brigus, Conception Bay as the son of Captain Abram Bartlett. Much like his father, Bartlett became a master mariner and sealing captain. He became the first of the Bartlett family to travel to the Arctic Ocean in 1869 when he brought Arctic explorer Isaac Hayes to Melville Bay, Greenland on board the Panther. He later transported Robert Peary during Peary's early unsuccessful attempts to reach the North Pole.

== Politics ==
Bartlett was twice elected to the Newfoundland House of Assembly. He successfully ran as an Anti-Confederate supporter of Premier Charles Fox Bennett in 1873, but he was quickly defeated in the succeeding 1874 election after Bennett's government had collapsed. Nearly a decade later, Bartlett re-entered the House of Assembly as an independent candidate in the 1882 election where he served an additional term before retiring in 1885. Historian D. W. Prowse would later recall that Bartlett became beloved for his campaign promise to install a "public grindstone" in each community in his district so that every citizen "could grind his own axe at the public expense." Public grindstones were erected in Brigus, Bareneed, Port de Grave, Clarke's Beach, and Pick Eyes.

Bartlett died in Brigus on July 15, 1925. His nephew Robert Bartlett later worked with Peary and was an Arctic explorer in his own right.
