= Henry LeMessurier =

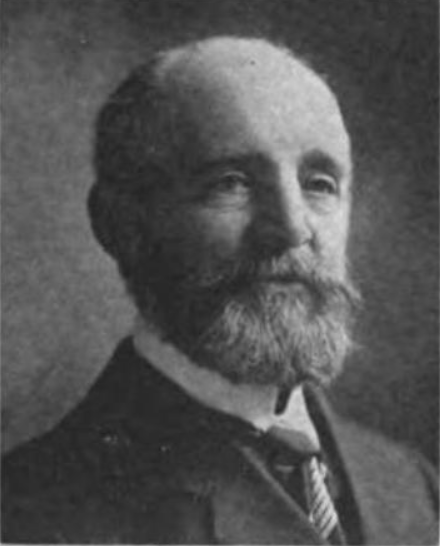

Member of the Newfoundland House of Assembly for Burin
- In office October 31, 1885 – November 6, 1889 Serving with John E. Peters
- Preceded by: James S. Winter
- Succeeded by: Edward Rothwell; James S. Tait

Personal details
- Born: Henry William LeMessurier; August 19, 1848; St. John's, Newfoundland Colony
- Died: May 27, 1931 (aged 82); St. John's, Newfoundland
- Political party: Reform
- Spouse: Elizabeth Arnott (m. 1872)
- Occupation: Civil servant

Henry William LeMessurier CMG (August 19, 1848 – May 27, 1931) was a civil servant and politician in Newfoundland. He represented Burin in the Newfoundland House of Assembly from 1885 to 1889 as a member of the Reform Party.

== Biography ==
The son of Henry C. LeMessurier, he was born in St. John's on August 19, 1848. He was educated at the General Protestant Academy there. LeMessurier married Elizabeth Arnott on February 12, 1872. He first worked as a clerk for the British garrison commissariat. In 1870, he went into business for himself. LeMessurier was named a justice of the peace in 1879. He was unsuccessful when he ran for reelection to the Newfoundland assembly in 1889. He worked as an editor for the Evening Herald and then was appointed to the customs department, becoming deputy minister and serving in that position until he retired in 1928.

LeMessurier lectured on historical topics and contributed to the Newfoundland Quarterly. He helped introduce curling to Newfoundland and was president of the St. John's Curling Association. LeMessurier was named a Companion of the Order of St Michael and St George. He died in St. John's in 1931.

He is credited with composing the popular Newfoundland folk song "The Ryans and the Pittmans", sometimes referred to as "We'll Rant and We'll Roar".
