= Frederick White (politician) =

Newfoundland politician

Frederick White MHA

Member of the House of Assembly for Bonavista Bay
- In office 1885–1889 Serving with James L. Noonan (1885–1886); Abram Kean (1885–1888); Alfred B. Morine (1886–1889); Donald Morison (1888–1889)
- Preceded by: George Skelton; Francis Winton; James L. Noonan
- Succeeded by: Donald Morison; Samuel Blandford; Alfred B. Morine

Personal details
- Party: Reform

Frederick White was a Newfoundland politician who represented Bonavista Bay in the Newfoundland House of Assembly form 1885 to 1889.
