= Michael H. Carty =

Newfoundland politician (1860–1900)

The Honourable Michael Carty QC

Minister without portfolio
- In office 1897 – April 1, 1900
- Prime Minister: James S. Winter

Member of the Newfoundland House of Assembly for Placentia and St. Mary's
- In office October 28, 1897 – November 8, 1900 Serving with Rhodie Callahan (1897–1900); William J. S. Donnelly (1897–1899); Richard T. McGrath (1899–1900)
- Preceded by: John T. Dunphy; Richard T. McGrath; Michael Tobin
- Succeeded by: Thomas Bonia; Edward Jackman

Member of the Newfoundland House of Assembly for St. George's
- In office November 12, 1894 – October 28, 1897
- Preceded by: James W. Keating
- Succeeded by: Michael Gibbs
- In office October 21, 1882 – November 6, 1893
- Preceded by: District established
- Succeeded by: James W. Keating

Personal details
- Born: 1860 County Sligo, Ireland
- Died: April 1, 1900 (aged 39–40) St. John's, Newfoundland Colony
- Party: Conservative (1882–1885, 1889–1900); Liberal (1885–?); Reform (?–1889)
- Relations: George T. Carty (brother)
- Occupation: Lawyer

Michael H. Carty (1860 – April 1, 1900) was an Irish-born lawyer and politician in Newfoundland. He served in the Newfoundland House of Assembly representing St. George's from 1882 to 1893 and Placentia-St. Mary's from 1897 to 1900.

== Politics ==
He was born and raised in County Sligo. Carty came to Newfoundland with his family in 1873. He was called to the bar in 1881 and opened his own law office, later practising in partnership with his brother George T. Carty. He was first elected to the assembly in 1882 to represent St. George's; he was defeated when he ran for reelection in 1893 but then was reelected in a by-election later that year. He was elected for Placentia and St. Mary's in 1897. He was named to the Executive Council as a minister without portfolio that same year. In 1898, he was named Queen's Counsel. Carty died in office in 1900.

The community of Cartyville took its name from him.
