= James Saint =

Newfoundland politician

Member of the House of Assembly for Bonavista Bay
- In office 1878–1882 Serving with George Skelton and Francis Winton
- Preceded by: Charles R. Bowring; A. J. W. McNeilly; John Henry Warren
- Succeeded by: Walter B. Grieve; George Skelton; Francis Winton

Personal details
- Born: c. 1833 Bonavista
- Died: 1913

James Saint (c. 1833–1913) was a Newfoundland politician who represented the district of Bonavista Bay from 1878 to 1882.

Saint's father was prominent merchant in the Bonavista area. Saint became involved in the business and eventually took over sometime before his fathers death. In 1887, Saint would sell the business after experiencing financial difficulties. He moved to British Columbia sometime after the sale of company.
