= A. J. W. McNeilly =

Newfoundland politician

The Honourable A. J. W. McNeilly MHA
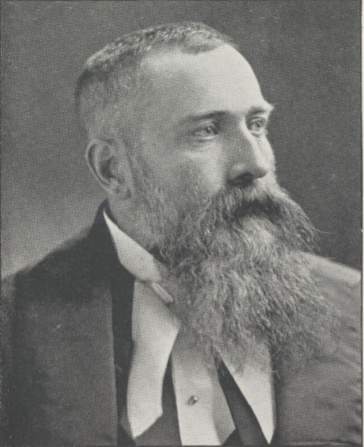
- McNeilly in 1894

12th Speaker of the Newfoundland House of Assembly
- In office 1886–1889
- Preceded by: Robert Bond
- Succeeded by: George H. Emerson
- In office 1879–1882
- Preceded by: James S. Winter
- Succeeded by: Robert J. Kent
Legislative offices
Member of the Newfoundland House of Assembly for Bay de Verde
In office October 31, 1885 – November 6, 1889 Serving with Stephen March
Preceded by	Levi Garland
Succeeded by	Edward White; Henry J. B. Woods
Member of the Newfoundland House of Assembly for Twillingate and Fogo
In office November 9, 1878 – November 6, 1882 Serving with Stanley B. Carter and Richard P. Rice
Preceded by	Frederick Carter; Charles Duder; William Kelligrew
Succeeded by	Smith McKay; Jabez P. Thompson
Member of the Newfoundland House of Assembly for Bonavista Bay
In office November 8, 1873 – November 9, 1878 Serving with Charles R. Bowring (1873–1878); John T. Burton (1873–1874); John H. Warren (1874–1878)
Preceded by	William M. Barnes; James L. Noonan; Francis Winton
Succeeded by	James Saint; George Skelton; Francis Winton

Personal details
- Born: August 7, 1845 Armagh, County Armagh, Ireland
- Died: October 9, 1911 (aged 66) St. John's, Newfoundland
- Party: Conservative (1873–1882); New (1882); Reform (1885–1889)
- Spouse: Jessie Emma Sutcliff (m. 1878)
- Children: 3 sons
- Relatives: James J. Rogerson (father-in-law)
- Education: Queen's University of Ireland
- Occupation: Lawyer

Alexander James Whiteford McNeilly (August 7, 1845 – October 9, 1911) was an Irish-born lawyer and political figure in Newfoundland. He represented Bonavista from 1873 to 1878, Twillingate and Fogo from 1878 to 1882 and Bay de Verde from 1885 to 1889 in the Newfoundland and Labrador House of Assembly.

He was born in Armagh, the son of Isaac McNeily and Olivia Whiteford, and came to Newfoundland with his brother and widowed mother in 1849. McNeilly studied at Queen's University in Ireland, articled in law with Hugh William Hoyles and was called to the bar in 1870. In 1878, he married Jessie Emma Sutcliff, the daughter of James Johnstone Rogerson. McNeilly was named Queen's Counsel in 1880. He was speaker for the Newfoundland assembly from 1879 to 1882 and from 1886 to 1889. He served as registrar for the Supreme Court of Newfoundland and Labrador from 1889 to 1900. He died in St. John's at the age of 66.
