= James Rolls =

Newfoundland politician

Member of the House of Assembly for Fogo
- In office 1885–1893
- Preceded by: As district of Twilingate-Fogo; Smith McKay; Richard P. Rice; Jabez P. Thompson
- Succeeded by: Thomas C. Duder

James Rolls was a Newfoundland politician who represented the district of Fogo in the House of Assembly from 1885 to 1899.

His father, James Rolls, was a successful merchant.
