= John H. Boone =

Newfoundland politician (1848–1884)

John H. Boone MHA
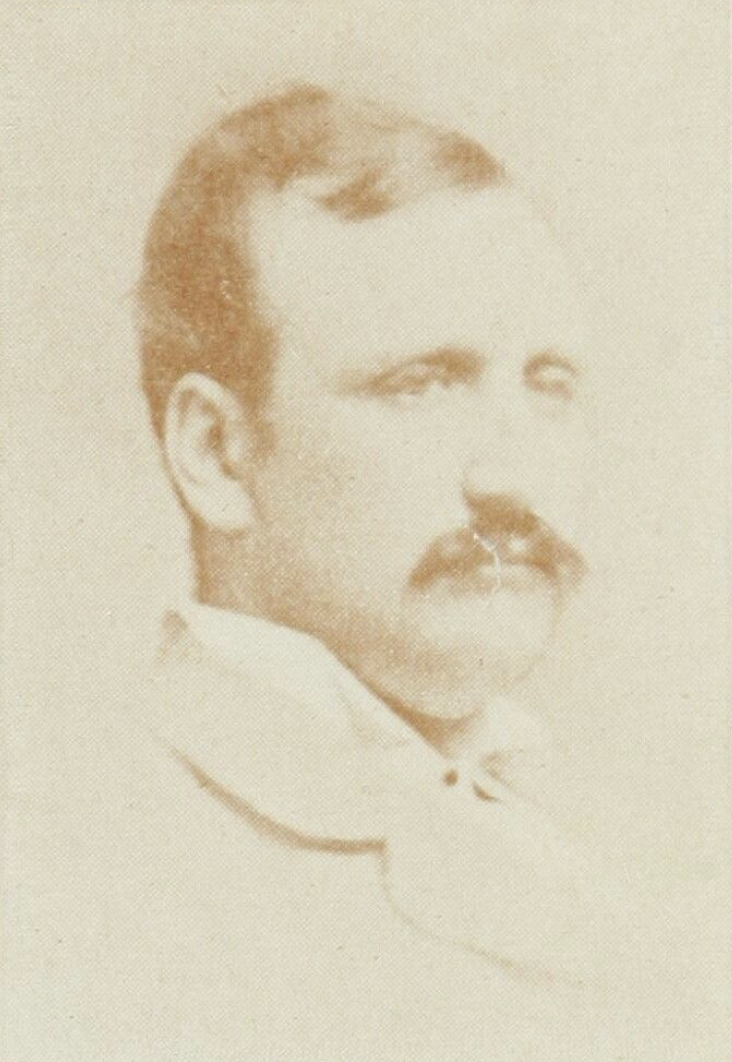

Member of the Newfoundland House of Assembly for White Bay
- In office November 6, 1882 – November 16, 1884
- Preceded by: District established
- Succeeded by: Albert Bradshaw

Personal details
- Born: John Hoyles Boone; April 30, 1848 Twillingate, Newfoundland Colony
- Died: November 16, 1884 (aged 36) St. John's, Newfoundland Colony
- Party: Conservative
- Education: Church of England Academy

John Hoyles Boone (April 30, 1848 – November 16, 1884) was a lawyer and politician in Newfoundland. He represented White Bay in the Newfoundland House of Assembly from 1882 until his death.

== Politics ==
Boone was born on April 30, 1848 in Twillingate as the son of the Reverend Thomas Boone, originally from Hampton, New Brunswick, and a woman (née Sinnott) who was descended from a United Empire Loyalist family. He was educated there and at the Church of England Academy in St. John's. Boone went on to study law and was called to the bar in 1870. He practised law in partnership with James Gervé Conroy from 1872. Boone was named solicitor for the Newfoundland assembly in 1874 and served until 1882, when he was elected to the assembly.

Boone died of pneumonia at St. John's at the age of 36.
