= Francis Winton =

Newfoundland politician (1829–1908)

Francis Winton MHA

Member of the Newfoundland House of Assembly for Bonavista Bay
- In office November 9, 1878 – October 31, 1885 Serving with James Saint (1878–1882); George Skelton (1878–1885); Walter B. Grieve (1882–1883); James L. Noonan (1883–1885)
- Preceded by: Charles R. Bowring; A. J. W. McNeilly; John H. Warren
- Succeeded by: Abram Kean; Frederick White
- In office November 13, 1869 – November 8, 1873 Serving with William M. Barnes and James L. Noonan
- Preceded by: John T. Burton; John T. Oakley; John H. Warren
- Succeeded by: Charles R. Bowring; John T. Burton; A. J. W. McNeilly

Personal details
- Born: June 4, 1829 St. John's, Newfoundland Colony
- Died: January 11, 1908 (aged 78) Pittsburgh, Pennsylvania, U.S.
- Party: Anti-Confederation (1869–1873); Conservative (1878–1885)
- Relatives: Henry D. Winton (father)
- Occupation: Journalist, newspaper owner

Francis Winton (June 4, 1829 – January 11, 1908) was a printer, publisher and politician in Newfoundland. He represented Bonavista in the Newfoundland House of Assembly from 1869 to 1873 as an Anti-Confederate supporter of premier Charles Fox Bennett and from 1878 to 1885 as a Conservative supporter of premier William Whiteway.

The son of Henry D. Winton and Elizabeth Nicholson, he was born in St. John's. In 1860, he was publishing the St. John's Daily News in partnership with his brother. In 1866, he began publishing the Day Book, later the Morning Chronicle. By 1894, Winton had moved to Pittsburgh, Pennsylvania, where he owned a newspaper called the Morning Chronicle. Winton and his wife both died there in 1908.
