= George Skelton (politician) =

Newfoundland politician

George Skelton MD MHA

Member of the Legislative Council of Newfoundland
- In office 1890 – January 9, 1920
- Appointed by: Terence O'Brien

Member of the Newfoundland House of Assembly for Bonavista Bay
- In office November 9, 1878 – October 31, 1885 Serving with James Saint (1878–1882); Francis Winton (1878–1885); Walter Grieve (1882–1883); James Noonan (1883–1885)
- Preceded by: Charles Bowring; A. J. W. McNeilly; John Warren
- Succeeded by: Abram Kean; Frederick White

Personal details
- Born: 1826 Bonavista, Newfoundland Colony
- Died: January 9, 1920 (aged 93–94) St. John's, Newfoundland
- Party: Conservative

George Skelton (1826 – January 9, 1920) was a physician and political figure in Newfoundland. He represented Bonavista Bay in the Newfoundland and Labrador House of Assembly from 1878 to 1885.

He was born in Bonavista, the son of doctor John Skelton. Skelton studied medicine in Scotland and practised in Greenspond. He was named a magistrate in 1873. He was defeated when he ran for reelection in 1885 and 1889. From 1890 to 1920, Skelton served in the Legislative Council of Newfoundland. He died in St. John's in 1920.
