= Michael J. O'Mara =

Canadian politician

Michael J. O'Mara (c. 1840 – December 23, 1892) was a lawyer and politician in Newfoundland. He represented St. John's East in the Newfoundland House of Assembly from 1878 to 1882 and from 1885 to 1889.

== Early life ==
The son of Thomas O'Mara, he was born in St. John's. O'Mara articled with George Hogsett, was called to the Newfoundland bar in 1862 and set up practice in St. John's.

== Career ==
In 1870, he was named chief clerk for the Central District Court. He was defeated in 1882 when he ran for reelection, but was elected as a Liberal in 1885. O'Mara was defeated when he ran for reelection in 1889 as a candidate for Robert Thorburn's Reform Party.

== Personal life ==
He was president of the Total Abstinence and Benefit Society, a temperance organization, from 1879 to 1882. He died in St. John's in 1892.

== See also ==
- List of people from Newfoundland and Labrador
