= Nathan Norman =

Canadian politician

Nathan Norman (September 22, 1809 – September 3, 1883) was a sealing captain and political figure in Newfoundland. He represented Port de Grave in the Newfoundland House of Assembly from 1878 to 1882.

He was born in Brigus and was educated there and then trained in navigation at Bull Cove. Norman owned a fishing establishment on Groswater Bay, Labrador. He was also a justice of the peace for Labrador. In 1841, Norman married Elizabeth Munden. He died in Brigus at the age of 73.
