= Stephen Rendell March =

Canadian politician

Stephen Rendell March (1851 – 1935) was a merchant and politician in Newfoundland. He represented Bay de Verde in the Newfoundland House of Assembly from 1885 to 1889 as a Reform member.

The son of Stephen March, he was born in Old Perlican and was educated at the Wesleyan Academy. March married Alma Agnes Bailey. With his brother Nathaniel, he ran S. March & Sons, the company established by his father. He retired from business in 1916 following the death of his brother.
