= Robert Thorburn (politician) =

Newfoundland merchant and politician (1836–1906)

The Honourable Sir Robert Thorburn MLC MHA
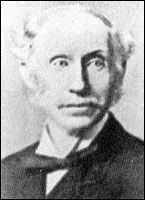
- Thorburn in 1894

7th Premier of Newfoundland
- In office October 12, 1885 – December 1889
- Preceded by: William Whiteway
- Succeeded by: William Whiteway

Member of the Legislative Council of Newfoundland
- In office 1893–1894
- Appointed by: William Whiteway
- In office 1870–1885
- Appointed by: Charles Fox Bennett

Member of the Newfoundland House of Assembly for Trinity Bay
- In office October 31, 1885 – November 6, 1889 Serving with Walter B. Grieve and Ellis C. Watson
- Preceded by: Robert Bond; Joseph Boyd; William Whiteway
- Succeeded by: Robert Bond; David Webber; William Whiteway

Personal details
- Born: March 28, 1836 Walkerburn, Peeblesshire, Scotland
- Died: April 12, 1906 (aged 70) St. John's, Newfoundland Colony
- Party: Reform
- Spouse: Susanna Janetta Milroy (m. 1865)
- Children: 5
- Occupation: Merchant

Sir Robert Thorburn (March 28, 1836 – April 12, 1906) was a British-born Newfoundlander merchant and politician who served as the Premier of Newfoundland Colony from 1885 to 1889.

== Early life and business career ==
Thorburn was born on March 28, 1836 at Juniper Bank near Walkerburn, Peeblesshire, Scotland to Robert Thorburn and Alison Thorburn (née Grieve). He emigrated to Newfoundland in 1852 to work at Baine, Johnston and Co., a mercantile firm owned and operated by his uncles Walter Grieve and James Johnstone Grieve. Thorburn then joined his uncle Walter when he split to establish his own firm, Walter Grieve and Company, in 1855, and he formally became Walter Grieve's Newfoundland agent in 1862.

== Politics ==
Thorburn became politically involved during the 1869 election as Newfoundlanders debated joining the nascent Dominion of Canada. As a merchant supporting his family's business interests, Thorburn campaigned alongside his uncle Walter against Confederation. Premier Charles Fox Bennett rewarded Thorburn by appointing him to the Legislative Council of Newfoundland in 1870.

Thorburn was an opponent of Premier William Whiteway's plans to build a national railway across the island as a means of diversifying and industrialising the economy, arguing that the colony should be developed along strict commercial lines based on the fisheries.

Traditionally, Newfoundland politics had been divided along sectarian lines with Catholics supporting the Liberals and Protestants supporting the Conservatives. Whiteway had been elected as a Conservative with the support of Protestants, but when his railway policy lost him the support of much of the business community, he reached out to the Catholic Liberals in order to stay in power, creating a cross-denominational coalition. Thorburn emerged as a prominent supporter of the opposition, which were hobbled together as the New Party in the 1882 election.

The Harbour Grace Affray, an 1883 sectarian melee between Irish Catholics of Riverhead and the Southside of Harbour Grace who confronted a parade of Orangemen. The resulting battle killed five and wounded seventeen. The riot strained relations between Catholics and Protestants and led to the collapse of Whiteway's government when Protestants deserted it. The religious violence gave Thorburn an opportunity. He joined with Orangemen and Protestants who had deserted Whiteway's government in the wake of the riot to create the Reform Party which swept to power in the 1885 election.

== Premiership (1885–1889) ==
In power, Thorburn's government turned away from the sectarian agenda that had brought it to power, instead focusing on the development of the cod fishery. An economic downturn was exacerbated by the colony's one-industry economy, forcing Thorburn to belatedly reverse himself and implement a public works agenda. It was too late, however, and Thorburn was defeated in 1889 by Whiteway and his new Liberal Party which had been created to promote the railway plan. The Reform Party collapsed and a new Tory Party emerged from its ashes but was only able to hold power twice for brief periods before disappearing.
