= Michael Tobin (politician) =

Canadian politician

Michael Tobin (1835–1908) was an Irish-born merchant and politician in Newfoundland. He represented Placentia and St. Mary's in the Newfoundland House of Assembly from 1882 to 1885.

He was born in Wexford and later came to Newfoundland. He was employed in the fishery supply business at St. John's and St. Mary's. His business ran into difficulties about the same time as he served in the Newfoundland assembly. He later was involved in another fishery supply business with a nephew J.J. Tobin; it was dissolved in 1893.
