= Walter B. Grieve =

Newfoundland merchant and politician (1850–1921)

The Honourable Walter Baine Grieve
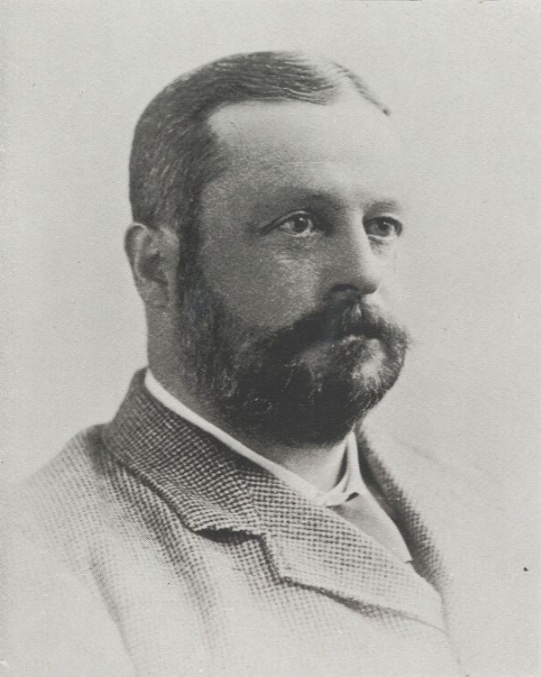

Member of the Legislative Council of Newfoundland
- In office 1919 – February 3, 1921
- Appointed by: Richard Squires
- In office August 2, 1894 – 1894
- Appointed by: Augustus F. Goodridge

Member of the Newfoundland House of Assembly for Trinity Bay
- In office October 31, 1885 – November 6, 1889 Serving with Robert Thorburn and Ellis C. Watson
- Preceded by: William Whiteway; Joseph Boyd; Robert Bond
- Succeeded by: William Whiteway; Robert Bond; David Webber

Member of the Newfoundland House of Assembly for Bonavista Bay
- In office November 2, 1882 – February 26, 1883 Serving with George Skelton and Francis Winton
- Preceded by: James Saint
- Succeeded by: James L. Noonan

Personal details
- Born: April 19, 1850 St. John's, Newfoundland Colony
- Died: February 3, 1921 (aged 70) St. John's, Newfoundland
- Party: New (1882-1883); Reform (1885-1889)
- Spouse: Ellen Marion Stone (m. 1880–1886)
- Occupation: Merchant

Walter Baine Grieve (April 19, 1850 – February 3, 1921) was a merchant and politician in Newfoundland. He represented Bonavista Bay from 1882 to 1883 and Trinity Bay from 1885 to 1889 in the Newfoundland and Labrador House of Assembly.

He was born in St. John's, the son of James Johnston Grieve. In 1872, he became manager of Baine Johnstons, a fishery supply firm also involved in the seal fishery. On April 6, 1880 in Gateshead, England he married Ellen Marion Stone. His election to the assembly in 1882 was declared void in the following year. Grieve served as a member of the Legislative Council in 1894 and from 1919 to 1921. He became a director of the Union Bank in 1894. In 1918, he was named to the Order of the British Empire. Grieve died in St. John's at the age of 70.
