= John T. Burton =

Newfoundland politician

John Thomas Burton (ca 1808 – May 3, 1880) was a newspaper publisher and political figure in Newfoundland. He represented Bonavista Bay from 1865 to 1869 and from 1873 to 1874 in the Newfoundland and Labrador House of Assembly.

He apprenticed as a printer with John D. Ryan. Burton published the Star and Conception Bay Journal, Comet, Telegraph, Star and Newfoundland Advocate, Newfoundland Express and Telegraph and Political Review. He was defeated in 1869 when he ran as a supporter of union with Canada. Burton moved to Montreal in 1873 and died there in 1880 at the age of 72.
