= Ellis C. Watson =

Canadian politician

Ellis Cornish Watson (1843 – December 12, 1906) was an English-born merchant and political figure in Newfoundland. He represented Trinity Bay in the Newfoundland and Labrador House of Assembly from 1885 to 1889.

== Biography ==
He was born in Torquay, Devon. He first came to Newfoundland in 1858 and returned to England in 1862. In 1865, he set up a business at Hant's Harbour; his brother James later joined him in business there. In 1870, Watson purchased a business at L'Anse-au-Loup. He served as Superintendent of Fisheries from 1898 to 1906. He died in Montreal in 1906.

His son Robert also served in the Newfoundland assembly.
