= Richard P. Rice =

Canadian politician

Richard Pigeon Rice (before 1846 – after 1897) was a merchant and politician in Newfoundland. He represented Twillingate and Fogo in the Newfoundland House of Assembly from 1878 to 1885.

He was a merchant at Twillingate. Rice was reelected in 1882 but fell out with William Whiteway over The Harbour Grace Affray of 1883, a confrontation between members of the Orange Order and Roman Catholics. He supported the Reform party being formed by Robert Thorburn and did not run for reelection in 1885. Rice served as magistrate of Greenspond from 1886 to 1897.
