= John E. Peters =

Canadian politician

John Edgar Pickavant Peters (1839–1919) was a businessman and politician in Newfoundland. He represented Burin in the Newfoundland House of Assembly from 1882 to 1885 as a member of the New Party and from 1885 to 1889 as a member of the Reform Party.

The son of Joseph Peters, principal of the Carbonear Grammar School, he was born in Carbonear. He studied accounting with his father and later worked as an accountant for the firm of Ayre and Marshall in St. John's. Peters married Rosa Cole, a niece of Charles R. Ayre. In 1875, he set up a dry goods firm with a partner. In 1883, he formed a partnership with Agnes Mitchell. Peters did not run for reelection in 1889.
