= Richard MacDonnell (Newfoundland politician) =

Canadian politician

Richard J. MacDonnell (c. 1841 – September 3, 1928) was an Irish-born businessman and politician in Newfoundland. He represented Harbour Main in the Newfoundland House of Assembly from 1882 to 1889.

He was born in Clonmere, County Cork and came to St. John's at a young age. By 1861, MacDonnell had moved to Brigus. He set up in business at Harbour Main and built a number of churches in the Conception Bay area. He was elected as a supporter of William Whiteway in 1882 and then as a Liberal in 1885. MacDonnell did not run for reelection in 1889. He ran unsuccessfully in the 1893 election as a Conservative and then in 1897 as a Liberal.

In 1898, he went to British Columbia, where he worked at the Crow's Nest Pass for the Canadian Pacific Railway. MacDonnell returned to Newfoundland in 1901 and served as magistrate for St. George's until 1922, when he retired due to poor health. He died at St. George's six years later.

He was awarded the Grand Cross of the Papal Order Pro Ecclesia et Pontifice in 1919 for service to the Roman Catholic Church. He was also named a member of the Order of the British Empire.

His son James R. MacDonnell also served in the Newfoundland assembly.
