= Alfred Penney =

Newfoundland politician (1850–1922)

Alfred Penney MHA
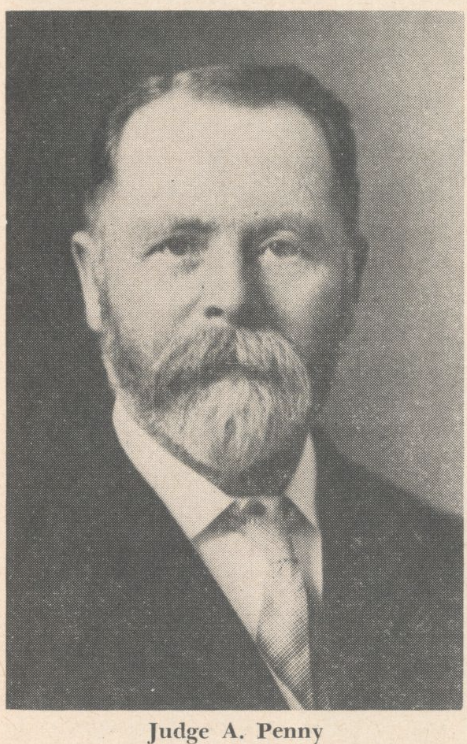

Member of the Newfoundland House of Assembly for Carbonear
- In office November 6, 1882 – November 6, 1889
- Preceded by: John Rorke
- Succeeded by: William Duff

Member of the Newfoundland House of Assembly for Bay de Verde
- In office November 9, 1878 – November 6, 1882
- Preceded by: James Rogerson
- Succeeded by: Levi Garland

Personal details
- Born: Alfred Penney; October 27, 1850 Carbonear, Newfoundland Colony
- Died: November 14, 1922 (aged 72) Carbonear, Newfoundland
- Party: Conservative (1878–1885); Reform (1885–1889)
- Relatives: William F. Penney (nephew)
- Occupation: Businessman

Alfred Penney (October 27, 1850 – November 14, 1922) was a merchant, judge and political figure in Newfoundland. He represented Bay de Verde in the Newfoundland and Labrador House of Assembly from 1878 to 1882 and Carbonear from 1882 to 1889.

He was born in Carbonear, the son of William H. Penney. He established himself in business in Carbonear. Penney served in the Executive Council as surveyor general from 1886 to 1889. An Orangeman, he introduced a motion in the assembly criticizing the acquittal of the Catholic defendants in The Harbour Grace Affray as a miscarriage of justice, which contributed to the fall of William Whiteway's government. Penney was defeated when he ran for reelection in 1889, 1893 and 1897. He was named a district court judge in 1897 and served in that post until his death in St. John's in 1922.
