= Charles R. Bowring =

Newfoundland politician and businessman

The Honourable Charles Rennie Bowring
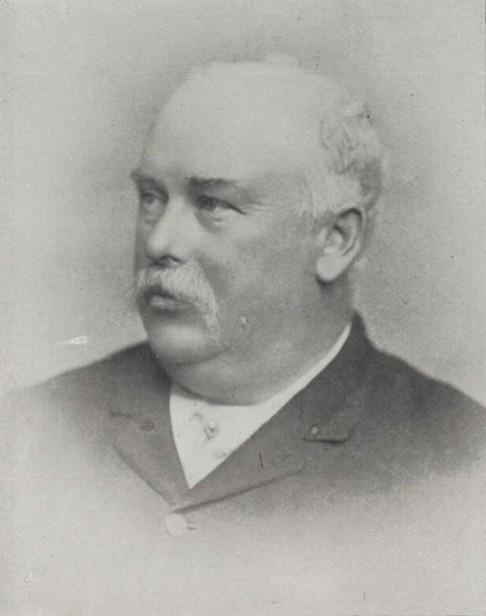

Member of the House of Assembly for Bonavista Bay
- In office 1873–1878
- Monarch: Queen Victoria

Personal details
- Born: October 7, 1839 St. John's, Newfoundland
- Died: January 31, 1890 (aged 50) St. John's, Newfoundland
- Spouse: Laura Warren
- Children: 10
- Occupation: Merchant, Politician

Charles Rennie Bowring (October 7, 1839 – January 31, 1890) was a merchant and politician born in St. John's, Newfoundland.

Bowring was born at St. John's to Charles Tricks Bowring and Harriet Harvey and was the grandson of Benjamin Bowring who had established Bowring Brothers, to be one of the largest steamship companies in Newfoundland. Charles' father was also a prominent businessman in Newfoundland.

Whilst an infant, his family moved to Liverpool, England, where he was educated and raised as a Unitarian. He was a junior partner of Bowring Brothers in Liverpool until he moved back to Newfoundland to become manager of the operation there.

Bowring Brothers, under Bowring's direction, became one of the leading firms in the seal and cod fisheries and in the transportation of foodstuff to the coastal communities. In 1876 the company was awarded the Newfoundland government's mail contract. These operations had taken them to a fleet of vessels numbering 57 sailing and steam vessels. Among all of its other ventures they also acted as the Newfoundland agent for several shipping and insurance companies, including Lloyd's of London from 1866. In 1884 the firm established the Red Cross Line, a passenger and freight service.

Around 1869, he married Laura, the daughter of John Henry Warren.

In 1873, Bowring had been elected as a Conservative to the House of Assembly for the district of Bonavista Bay, and was re-elected the next year following the defeat of the anti-confederate government led by Charles Fox Bennett. In 1886, Bowring was appointed to the Legislative Council by Prime Minister Robert Thorburn. He consistently opposed the incorporation of the city of St. John's when it came before the council and in 1886 he refused to support a bill to provide a sewage system for the city proposed by the government.

Bowring was a director of the Commercial Bank in St. John's, a member of the St. John's Chamber of Commerce, chairman of the St. John's Gas Light Company, and one of the largest shareholders in the Atlantic Hotel and a prominent member and president of the Athenaeum Society. He was also actively involved in the completion of the Cathedral of St. John the Baptist, a project undertaken in 1880.
