= Alexander McLellan Mackay =

Newfoundland politician (1834–1905)

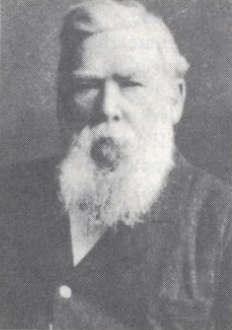

Alexander McLellan Mackay (1834 – November 24, 1905) was a businessman and politician in Newfoundland. He represented Burgeo from 1878 to 1885 as a Liberal and Port de Grave from 1900 to 1905 as a Conservative in the Newfoundland and Labrador House of Assembly.

He was born in Pictou, Nova Scotia. He taught school for a short time and then worked as a telegraph operator in Halifax, Hamilton and New York City. In 1859, Mackay married Elizabeth O'Neill. He came to Newfoundland in 1857 as superintendent for the New York, Newfoundland and London Telegraph Company (later the Anglo-American Telegraph Company). Mackay served in the province's Executive Council as a minister without portfolio from 1882 to 1885. In 1885, he founded the St. John's Electric Light Company, the first and established the first public telephone system in Newfoundland in St. John's. He was named to the Legislative Council of Newfoundland in 1885 and served until 1896, when he was forced to resign after being accused of misuse of public funds.

Mackay was provincial grand master for the Freemasons from 1867 until his death. He died in St. John's in 1905.
