= William J. S. Donnelly =

Newfoundland politician

William J. S. Donnelly (c. 1844 – March 11, 1914) was an author and political figure in Newfoundland. He represented Placentia and St. Mary's in the Newfoundland and Labrador House of Assembly from 1878 to 1889, from 1893 to 1894 and from 1897 to 1899 as a Liberal, then Reform and later as a Conservative.

He was born in Spaniard's Bay, the son of William Donnelly. He served as a member of the Legislative Council of Newfoundland from 1874 to 1878. Donnelly served in the Executive Council as financial secretary from 1874 to 1879, as surveyor general from 1879 to 1882 and as receiver general from 1882 to 1885, from 1886 to 1889, in 1894 and in 1899. When Donnelly was named to cabinet in 1894, he was required to run for reelection in a by-election and was defeated by Liberal John T. Dunphy. He was named to cabinet again in 1899, again was required to run for reelection and again was defeated, this time by Richard T. McGrath. He retired from politics in 1899 and became a customs inspector. He wrote A History of the Public Debt in Newfoundland 1834-1900, published in 1900. He died in St. John's in 1914.
