= Conservative parties in Newfoundland (pre-Confederation) =

Former Newfoundland political party

The Conservative Party of Newfoundland was a political party in the Dominion of Newfoundland prior to Confederation with Canada in 1949.

== History ==
=== Formation ===
The party was formed by members and supporters of the establishment around 1832. In the 1840s, they opposed the proposal for responsible government which was finally granted in 1855. Since the concept was opposed generally by members of the Anglican establishment, the early party was almost entirely Protestant. As politics in Newfoundland developed along sectarian lines, the Conservatives became the Protestant party (with strong links to the Orange Order), while the Liberals were the Catholic party.

=== Union and collapse ===
Under Sir Frederick Carter, the Conservatives supported joining Canadian Confederation, and campaigned on the proposal in the 1869 general election. The party was badly defeated by Charles Fox Bennett's Anti-Confederation Party. The Conservatives returned to power in 1874, but never proposed joining Canada again.

The Conservative party later absorbed the rival Liberals, putting an end to sectarian divisions with a 'denominational compromise'.

The united party collapsed in the 1880s when members of the Orange Order abandoned the government of William Whiteway, and formed a new Reform Party under Robert Thorburn. The Reform Party won the 1885 election on a platform of 'Protestant Rights'.

=== Later period ===
Whiteway founded a new Liberal Party after the collapse of the Reform Party. Members of the Orange Order formed a new Tory Party, which formed two short-lived administrations in the 1890s before disappearing.

Individual Conservatives were elected as Opposition or United Opposition MHAs before being subsumed into the Newfoundland People's Party (later the Liberal-Labour-Progressive Party) formed by Edward Patrick Morris in 1907 after he resigned from the Liberal government of Sir Robert Bond.

In 1924, the Liberal-Conservative-Progressive Party was formed by members of the LLP Party who were largely conservatives and discontented members of the ruling Liberal Reform Party. This new party won the 1924 general election, making its leader Walter Stanley Monroe the new prime minister. In practice, the party was essentially a Tory party.

The party was defeated in 1928 under new leader Frederick C. Alderdice; however, they returned to power in 1932 as the United Newfoundland Party (UNP). The UNP ruled for two years until the suspension of responsible government.

=== Loss of independence ===
When responsible government was suspended, Newfoundland's status as an independent dominion within the British Empire was brought to an end. The Government of the United Kingdom appointed a Commission of Government to govern Newfoundland, bringing an end to party politics on the island.

Party politics returned to Newfoundland when it joined Canadian Confederation in 1949. At this time, the modern Liberal and Progressive Conservative parties were formed. These new parties were unrelated to the parties that existed prior to 1934.

== List of leaders ==
Conservative Party of Newfoundland

- Hugh Hoyles (1855–1865)
- Frederick Carter (1865–1878)
- William Whiteway (1878–1885)

Reform Party of Newfoundland

- Robert Thorburn (1885–1889)

Conservative Party of Newfoundland

- Alfred B. Morine (1889–1897)
- James S. Winter (1897–1900)
- Alfred B. Morine (1900–1906)
- Donald Morison (1906–1907)

Newfoundland People's Party

- Edward Morris (1907–1917)
- Michael Cashin (1917–1919)

Liberal-Progressive Party

- Michael Cashin (1919–1923)

Liberal-Labour-Progressive Party

- John R. Bennett (1923–1924)

Liberal-Conservative Progressive Party

- Walter S. Monroe (1924–1928)
- Frederick C. Alderdice (1928–1932)

United Newfoundland Party

- Frederick C. Alderdice (1932–1934)

== Election results ==
Election	Leader	Votes	%	Seats	+/−	Position	Status
1832	—N/a	3,025	40.9	10 / 15	▲10	▲1st	Majority
1836	—N/a	—N/a	—N/a	3 / 15	▼7	▼2nd	Opposition
1837	—N/a	—N/a	—N/a	2 / 15	▼1	2nd	Opposition
1842	—N/a	—N/a	—N/a	7 / 15	▲5	2nd	Opposition
1848	—N/a	—N/a	—N/a	6 / 15	▼1	2nd	Opposition
1852	—N/a	—N/a	—N/a	6 / 15	Steady	2nd	Opposition
1855	Hugh Hoyles	—N/a	—N/a	12 / 30	▲6	2nd	Opposition
1859	Hugh Hoyles	3,129	30.2	12 / 30	Steady	1st	Opposition
1861	Hugh Hoyles	84 (Note: The Conservative caucus in this election were elected entirely by acclamation, and the only votes the government received were through an unsuccessful candidate.)	1.5	16 / 30	▲4	▲1st	Majority
1865	Frederick Carter	10,187	59.2	22 / 30	▲6	1st	Majority
1869	Frederick Carter	—N/a	—N/a	9 / 30	▼13	▼2nd	Opposition
1873	Frederick Carter	—N/a	—N/a	14 / 30	▲5	2nd	Opposition
1874	Frederick Carter	10,284	55.1	18 / 30	▲4	▲1st	Majority
1878	William Whiteway	—N/a	—N/a	21 / 30	▲3	1st	Majority
1882	William Whiteway	25,873	65.5	26 / 33	▲26	1st	Majority
1885 (Note: As the Reform Party)	Robert Thorburn	12,213	39.8	21 / 36	▲8	2nd	Majority
1889	Robert Thorburn	22,292	36.5	7 / 36	▼14	▼2nd	Opposition
1893	Walter B. Grieve and Moses Monroe	35,546	45.6	12 / 36	▲5	2nd	Opposition
1897	James S. Winter	47,581	55.9	23 / 36	▲11	▲1st	Majority
1900	Alfred B. Morine	29,217	35.4	4 / 36	▼19	▼2nd	Opposition
1904 (Note: As the United Opposition Party)	Alfred B. Morine	34,697	39.6	6 / 36	▲2	2nd	Opposition
1908 (Note: As the People's Party)	Edward Morris	47,487	49.3	18 / 36	▲12	2nd	Tie
1909	Edward Morris	54,111	52.3	26 / 36	▲8	▲1st	Majority
1913	Edward Morris	51,451	45.6	21 / 36	▼5	1st	Majority
1919 (Note: As the Liberal-Progressive Party)	Michael P. Cashin	43,250	36.7	12 / 36	▼9	▼2nd	Opposition
1923 (Note: As the Liberal-Labour-Progressive Party)	John R. Bennett	60,658	48.0	13 / 36	▲1	2nd	Opposition
1924 (Note: As the Liberal-Conservative Progressive Party)	Walter S. Monroe	57,391	57.9	25 / 36	▲12	▲1st	Majority
1928	Frederick C. Alderdice	45,787	42.8	12 / 40	▼13	▼2nd	Opposition
1932 (Note: As the United Newfoundland Party)	Frederick C. Alderdice	82,037	70.9	24 / 27	▲12	▲1st	Majority

== See also ==
- List of Newfoundland Prime Ministers
- List of political parties in Newfoundland and Labrador
- General elections in Newfoundland (pre-Confederation)
