= 1900 Newfoundland general election =

Election in the Colony of Newfoundland

- November 8, 1900

36 seats of the Newfoundland House of Assembly 19 seats needed for a majority
- Turnout: 68.96% (▼6.22pp)
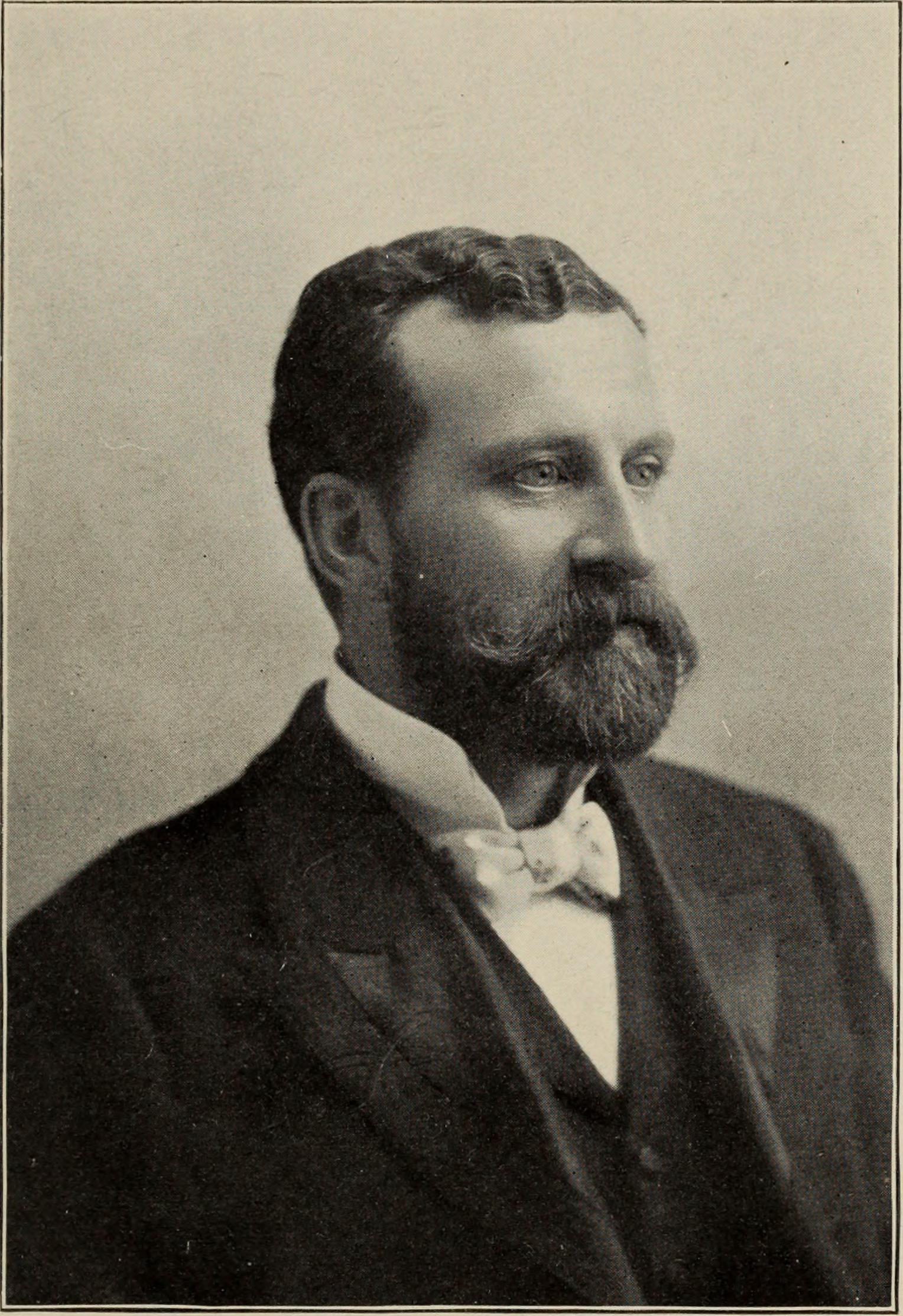

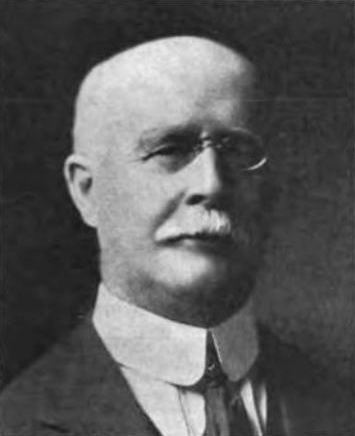
	First party	Second party
Leader	Robert Bond	Alfred Morine
Party	Liberal	Conservative
Leader since	1897	1900
Leader's seat	Twillingate	Bonavista Bay
Last election	13	23
Seats won	32	4
Seat change	▲19	▼19
Popular vote	51,657	29,217
Percentage	62.68%	35.45%
Swing	▲20.32%	▼20.44%
- Results by district
Premier before election
Robert Bond
Liberal
Premier after election
Robert Bond
Liberal

The 1900 Newfoundland general election was held on 8 November 1900 to elect members of the 19th General Assembly of Newfoundland in the self-governing British colony. The Liberal Party led by Robert Bond formed the government. The railway policy of the Conservative government under James S. Winter was highly unpopular, which led to the party's defeat under Alfred Morine's leadership.

== Results ==
Party	Leader	1897	Candidates	Seats won	Seat change	% of seats (% change)	Popular vote	% of vote (% change)
Liberal	Robert Bond	13	36	32	▲19	88.89% (▲52.78%)	51,657	62.68% (▲20.32%)
Conservative	Alfred Morine	23	36	4	▼19	11.11% (▼52.78%)	29,217	35.45% (▼20.44%)
Other		0	6	0	Steady	0.00%	1,542	1.87% (▲0.12%)
Totals		36	78	36	Steady	100%	82,416 (Note: This figure includes votes cast for more than one candidate in multi-member districts. A total of 37,190 individual votes were cast in this election.)	100%

== Results by district ==
- Names in **boldface type** represent party leaders.
- † indicates that the incumbent did not run again.
- ‡ indicates that the incumbent ran in a different district.

=== St. John's ===
Electoral district	Candidates			Incumbent
Electoral district	Liberal (historical)	Conservative (historical)	Other	Incumbent
St. John's East; 73.71% turnout	John Dwyer; 2,538; 25.06%	Thomas White; 806; 7.96%	James J. Pitman (Independent); 229; 2.26%	John Dwyer
St. John's East; 73.71% turnout	Lawrence Furlong; 2,533; 25.01%	John Ryan; 772; 7.62%	James J. Pitman (Independent); 229; 2.26%	Thomas Murphy
St. John's East; 73.71% turnout	Thomas Murphy; 2,500; 24.69%	Robert Parsons Jr. 749; 7.40%	James J. Pitman (Independent); 229; 2.26%	Lawrence Furlong
St. John's West; 76.97% turnout	Edward Morris; 2,317; 24.90%	Samuel Collier; 1,059; 11.38%		Edward Morris
St. John's West; 76.97% turnout	John Anderson; 2,096; 22.53%	Charles Ryan; 985; 10.59%		James Tessier†
St. John's West; 76.97% turnout	John Scott; 2,012; 21.63%	John J. Mullaly; 835; 8.97%		Vacant (Note: James Callanan had been elected in 1897, but he had died while in office on June 8, 1900.)

=== Conception Bay ===
Electoral district	Candidates			Incumbent
Electoral district	Liberal (historical)	Conservative (historical)	Other	Incumbent
Bay de Verde; 76.58% turnout	Henry Woods; 916; 25.63%	Isaac Mercer; 875; 24.48%		Abram Kean‡ (ran in Twillingate)
Bay de Verde; 76.58% turnout	Michael Knight; 911; 25.49%	William Rogerson; 872; 24.40%		William Rogerson
Carbonear; 71.70% turnout	Joseph Maddock; 591; 59.22%	John Powell; 407; 40.78%		William Duff†
Harbour Grace; 74.61% turnout	Eli Dawe; 1,242; 18.91%	Charles Dawe; 1,016; 15.47%		William Horwood‡ (ran in Trinity Bay)
Harbour Grace; 74.61% turnout	Augustus Harvey; 1,195; 18.19%	Graham Munn; 1,012; 15.41%		Eli Dawe
Harbour Grace; 74.61% turnout	William Oke; 1,190; 18.12%	Thomas Ross; 913; 13.90%		William Oke
Harbour Main; 67.03% turnout	Frank Morris; 931; 32.80%	Michael O'Toole; 296; 10.43%	John Lewis (Independent); 583; 20.54%	John St. John
Harbour Main; 67.03% turnout	John St. John; 778; 27.41%	Thomas Fitzgibbon; 250; 8.81%	John Lewis (Independent); 583; 20.54%	William Woodford†
Port de Grave; 67.59% turnout	Jabez Thompson; 630; 47.95%	Alexander Mackay; 684; 52.05%		Charles Dawe‡ (ran in Harbour Grace)

=== Avalon Peninsula ===
Electoral district	Candidates			Incumbent
Electoral district	Liberal (historical)	Conservative (historical)	Other	Incumbent
Ferryland; 87.50% turnout	Michael Cashin; 1,048; 40.75%	James McCullock; 190; 7.39%	Michael Condon (Independent); 374; 14.54%	Michael Cashin
Ferryland; 87.50% turnout	James Ryan; 837; 32.54%	J. N. Cleary; 123; 4.78%	Michael Condon (Independent); 374; 14.54%	George Shea†
Placentia and St. Mary's; 72.57% turnout	Edward Jackman; 1,907; 25.04%	Thomas Fitzpatrick; 612; 8.03%	Thomas Sullivan (Independent); 160; 2.10%	Richard McGrath
Placentia and St. Mary's; 72.57% turnout	Thomas Bonia; 1,885; 24.74%	Michael Gibbs; 563; 7.39%	Michael Tobin (Independent); 122; 1.60%	Rhodie Callahan†
Placentia and St. Mary's; 72.57% turnout	Richard McGrath; 1,817; 23.85%	J. H. Dee; 551; 7.23%	Michael Tobin (Independent); 122; 1.60%	Michael Carty†

=== Eastern Newfoundland ===
Electoral district	Candidates		Incumbent
Electoral district	Liberal (historical)	Conservative (historical)	Incumbent
Bonavista Bay; 62.19% turnout	Charles Hutchings; 1,266; 13.68%	**Alfred Morine**; 1,874; 20.25%	Darius Blandford
Bonavista Bay; 62.19% turnout	John Cowan; 1,258; 13.60%	Darius Blandford; 1,843; 19.92%	John Cowan
Bonavista Bay; 62.19% turnout	Albert Martin; 1,238; 13.38%	Mark Chaplin; 1,774; 19.17%	**Alfred Morine**
Trinity Bay; 54.82% turnout	George Gushue; 1,990; 20.87%	Robert Watson; 1,286; 13.48%	Robert Bremner†
Trinity Bay; 54.82% turnout	George Johnson; 1,905; 19.97%	Reuben Horwood; 1,283; 13.45%	Robert Watson
Trinity Bay; 54.82% turnout	William Horwood; 1,901; 19.93%	Alex McKay; 1,172; 12.29%	John Robinson†

=== Central Newfoundland ===
Electoral district	Candidates		Incumbent
Electoral district	Liberal (historical)	Conservative (historical)	Incumbent
Fogo; 61.70% turnout	Henry Earle; 743; 67.92%	Andrew Cook; 351; 32.08%	Thomas Duder†
Twillingate; 71.47% turnout	**Robert Bond**; 2,207; 22.86%	Alan Goodridge; 1,244; 12.89%	**Robert Bond**
Twillingate; 71.47% turnout	James Clift; 2,044; 21.17%	Abram Kean; 1,119; 11.59%	Vacant (Note: Donald Browning had been elected in 1897, but he had resigned from the House of Assembly in 1899 and became the registrar for the Supreme Court of Newfoundland.)
Twillingate; 71.47% turnout	George Roberts; 2,002; 20.74%	John Aitken; 1,037; 10.74%	Alan Goodridge

=== Southern and Western Newfoundland ===
Electoral district	Candidates			Incumbent
Electoral district	Liberal (historical)	Conservative (historical)	Other	Incumbent
Burgeo and LaPoile; 71.44% turnout	Charles Emerson; 679; 56.92%	Robert Moulton; 514; 43.08%		Henry Mott‡ (ran in St. Barbe)
Burin; 64.03% turnout	Henry Gear; 990; 33.64%	John Lake; 492; 16.72%	Joseph Coady (Independent Liberal); 74; 2.51%	James S. Winter†
Burin; 64.03% turnout	Edward Davey; 923; 31.36%	Frank Lilly; 464; 15.77%	Joseph Coady (Independent Liberal); 74; 2.51%	John Lake
Fortune Bay; 59.04% turnout	Charles Way; 1,006; 81.52%	L. A. McCuish; 228; 18.48%		Charles Way
St. Barbe; 69.51% turnout	Alexander Parsons; 794; 63.22%	Henry Mott; 462; 36.78%		Albert Bradshaw†
St. George's; 68.07% turnout	William Howley; 837; 62.42%	Duncan McIsaac; 504; 37.58%		Michael Gibbs‡ (ran in Placentia and St. Mary's)
