= 1897 Newfoundland general election =

Election in the Colony of Newfoundland

- October 28, 1897

36 seats of the Newfoundland House of Assembly 19 seats needed for a majority
- Turnout: 75.30% (▼0.94pp)
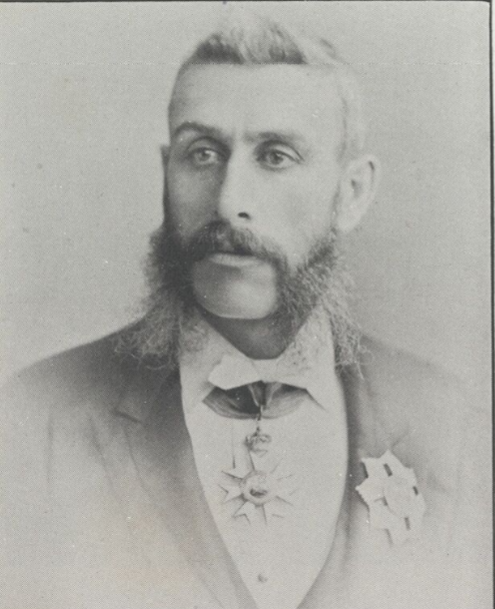

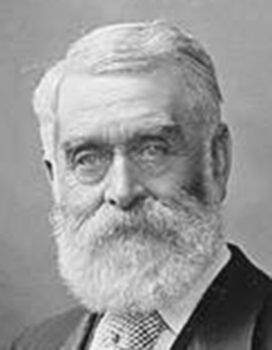
	First party	Second party
Leader	James Winter	William Whiteway
Party	Conservative	Liberal
Leader since	1897	1885
Leader's seat	Burin (Note: Not the incumbent, but ran in this district and won.)	Harbour Grace; Ran in Trinity Bay (lost)
Last election	12 seats, 45.59%	23 seats, 50.68%
Seats won	23	13
Seat change	▲11	▼10
Popular vote	47,581	36,062
Percentage	55.89%	42.36%
Swing	▲10.30%	▼8.32%
- Results by district
Premier before election
William Whiteway
Liberal
Premier after election
James Winter
Conservative

The 1897 Newfoundland general election was held on October 28, 1897 to elect members of the 18th General Assembly of Newfoundland. The Conservative Party led by James Spearman Winter formed the government. On February 15, 1900, the government was defeated following a vote on a motion of no confidence which was supported by the Liberals and several Tories.

== Results ==
Party	Leader	1893	Candidates	Seats won	Seat change	% of seats (% change)	Popular vote	% of vote (% change)
Conservative	James Winter	12	36	23	▲11	63.89% (▲30.56%)	47,581	55.89% (▲10.30%)
Liberal	William Whiteway	23	36	13	▼10	36.11% (▼27.78%)	36,062	42.36% (▼8.32%)
Other		1	4	0	▼1	0.00% (▼2.78%)	1,490	1.75% (▼1.97%)
Totals		36	76	36	Steady	100%	85,133 (Note: This figure includes votes cast for more than one candidate in multi-member districts. A total of 49,386 individual votes were cast in this election.)	100%

== Results by district ==
- Names in **boldface type** represent party leaders.
- † indicates that the incumbent did not run again.
- ‡ indicates that the incumbent ran in a different district.

=== St. John's ===
Electoral district	Candidates			Incumbent
Electoral district	Liberal (historical)	Conservative (historical)	Other	Incumbent
St. John's East; 78.79% turnout	John P. Fox; 1,973; 19.06%	Edward Shea; 1,531; 14.79%	Thomas Keating (Independent); 669; 6.46%	John P. Fox
St. John's East; 78.79% turnout	Thomas Murphy; 1,720; 16.62%	Robert Parsons Jr. 1,478; 14.28%	Thomas Keating (Independent); 669; 6.46%	Charles Hutton†
St. John's East; 78.79% turnout	Lawrence Furlong; 1,577; 15.24%	Patrick O'Neil; 1,401; 13.54%	Thomas Keating (Independent); 669; 6.46%	Lawrence Furlong
St. John's West; 81.99% turnout	Edward Morris; 1,752; 19.04%	Thomas White; 1,461; 15.88%		Edward Morris
St. John's West; 81.99% turnout	James Tessier; 1,610; 17.50%	Charles Ryan; 1,418; 15.41%		Patrick Scott‡ (ran in Placentia and St. Mary's)
St. John's West; 81.99% turnout	James Callanan; 1,588; 17.26%	Jacob Chafe; 1,371; 14.90%		Thomas Jackman†

=== Conception Bay ===
Electoral district	Candidates			Incumbent
Electoral district	Liberal (historical)	Conservative (historical)	Other	Incumbent
Bay de Verde; 80.98% turnout	Henry J. B. Woods; 829; 22.64%	Abram Kean; 1,035; 28.27%		Henry Woods
Bay de Verde; 80.98% turnout	Michael Knight; 784; 21.41%	William Rogerson; 1,013; 27.67%		John Ayre†
Carbonear; 71.75% turnout	William Duff; 537; 51.68%	Alfred Penney; 502; 48.32%		William Duff
Harbour Grace; 76.00% turnout	William Horwood; 1,073; 17.57%	William Ward; 915; 14.98%	D. J. Green (Independent); 247; 4.04%	Henry Dawe
Harbour Grace; 76.00% turnout	Eli Dawe; 1,060; 17.35%	Henry Dawe; 902; 14.77%	D. J. Green (Independent); 247; 4.04%	**William Whiteway**‡ (ran in Trinity Bay)
Harbour Grace; 76.00% turnout	William Oke; 1,050; 17.19%	Graham Munn; 861; 14.10%	D. J. Green (Independent); 247; 4.04%	Eli Dawe
Harbour Main; 74.80% turnout	Frank Morris; 687; 20.56%	John St. John; 1,038; 31.06%		Frank Morris
Harbour Main; 74.80% turnout	Richard MacDonnell; 599; 17.92%	William Woodford; 1,018; 30.46%		William Woodford
Port de Grave; 69.18% turnout	James Clift; 390; 30.12%	Charles Dawe; 905; 69.88%		Charles Dawe

=== Avalon Peninsula ===
Electoral district	Candidates			Incumbent
Electoral district	Liberal (historical)	Conservative (historical)	Other	Incumbent
Ferryland; 86.88% turnout	Michael Cashin; 809; 32.03%	George Shea; 677; 26.80%	Michael Condon (Independent); 245; 9.70%	Michael Cashin
Ferryland; 86.88% turnout	Martin W. Furlong; 512; 20.27%	J. E. White; 283; 11.20%	Michael Condon (Independent); 245; 9.70%	Daniel Greene†
Placentia and St. Mary's; 78.32% turnout	Richard McGrath; 1,005; 12.55%	William J. S. Donnelly; 1,769; 22.09%		Richard McGrath
Placentia and St. Mary's; 78.32% turnout	Patrick Scott; 930; 11.61%	Rhodie Callahan; 1,707; 21.31%		Michael Tobin†
Placentia and St. Mary's; 78.32% turnout	William O'Reilly; 894; 11.16%	Michael Carty; 1,704; 21.28%		John Dunphy†

=== Eastern Newfoundland ===
Electoral district	Candidates		Incumbent
Electoral district	Liberal (historical)	Conservative (historical)	Incumbent
Bonavista Bay; 69.56% turnout	James Tait; 829; 8.45%	Darius Blandford; 2,524; 25.73%	Donald Morison†
Bonavista Bay; 69.56% turnout	Albert H. Martin; 788; 8.03%	John Cowan; 2,519; 25.68%	Alfred Morine‡ (ran in Twillingate)
Bonavista Bay; 69.56% turnout	James Blandford; 767; 7.81%	John A. Robinson; 2,384; 24.30%	Darius Blandford
Trinity Bay; 78.89% turnout	**William Whiteway**; 1,317; 12.19%	Robert Bremner; 2,507; 23.20%	William Horwood‡ (ran in Harbour Grace)
Trinity Bay; 78.89% turnout	George Gushue; 1,250; 11.57%	Robert Watson; 2,317; 21.44%	George Gushue
Trinity Bay; 78.89% turnout	George Johnson; 1,229; 11.37%	Levi March; 2,186; 20.23%	George Johnson

=== Central Newfoundland ===
Electoral district	Candidates		Incumbent
Electoral district	Liberal (historical)	Conservative (historical)	Incumbent
Fogo; 67.10% turnout	Charles Earle; 464; 39.22%	Thomas Duder; 719; 60.78%	Thomas Duder
Twillingate; 78.94% turnout	Robert Bond; 1,865; 18.85%	Alan Goodridge; 1,674; 16.92%	Giles Foote†
Twillingate; 78.94% turnout	Donald Browning; 1,688; 17.06%	Alfred Morine; 1,606; 16.23%	Augustus Goodridge†
Twillingate; 78.94% turnout	George Roberts; 1,615; 16.32%	Joshua Taverner; 1,447; 14.62%	Robert Bond

=== Southern and Western Newfoundland ===
Electoral district	Candidates			Incumbent
Electoral district	Liberal (historical)	Conservative (historical)	Other	Incumbent
Burgeo and LaPoile; 69.94% turnout	James Murray; 440; 40.93%	Henry Mott; 635; 59.07%		Henry Mott
Burin; 75.39% turnout	Henry Gear; 578; 17.85%	**James Winter**; 1,072; 33.10%		James Pitman‡ (ran in Fortune Bay)
Burin; 75.39% turnout	William B. Payne; 577; 17.81%	John Lake; 1,012; 31.24%		Henry Gear
Fortune Bay; 64.21% turnout	James Pitman; 474; 37.80%	Henry Hayward; 780; 62.20%		Vacant (Note: James Fraser Jr. had been elected in 1893, but he had died while in office on April 22, 1896.)
St. Barbe; 58.40% turnout	Alexander A. Parsons; 355; 36.75%	Albert Bradshaw; 611; 63.25%		Alexander Parsons
St. George's; 74.57% turnout	Maurice Devine; 447; 32.51%	Michael Gibbs; 599; 43.56%	James Hayse (Independent); 329; 23.93%	Michael Carty‡ (ran in Placentia and St. Mary's)
