= 18th General Assembly of Newfoundland =

Colony of Newfoundland legislature

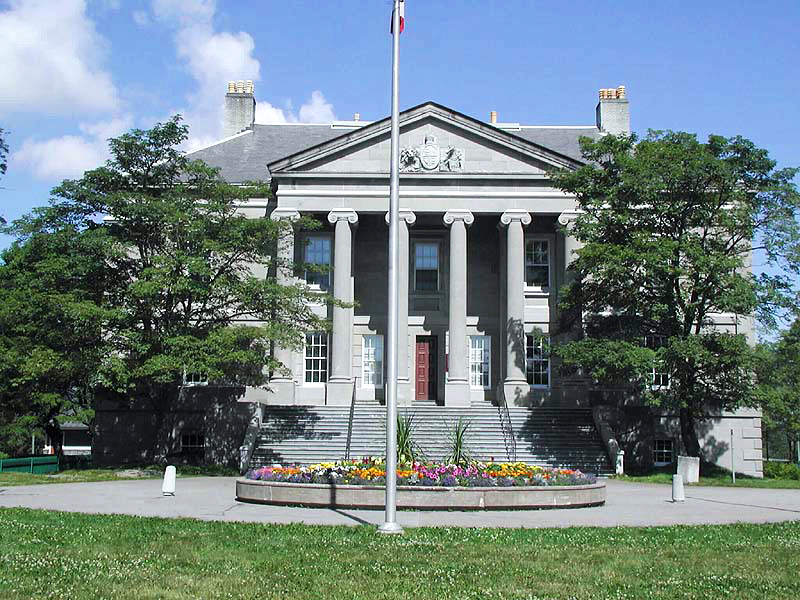
- Colonial Building seat of the Newfoundland government and the House of Assembly from January 28, 1850, to July 28, 1959.

History
- Founded: 1898
- Disbanded: 1900
- Preceded by: 17th General Assembly of Newfoundland
- Succeeded by: 19th General Assembly of Newfoundland

Leadership
- Premier: James Spearman Winter

Elections
- Last election: 1897 Newfoundland general election

The members of the 18th General Assembly of Newfoundland were elected in the Newfoundland general election held in October 1897. The general assembly sat from 1898 to 1900.

The Tory Party led by James Spearman Winter formed the government.

Henry Y. Mott was chosen as speaker.

Sir Henry Edward McCallum served as colonial governor of Newfoundland.

== Members of the Assembly ==
The following members were elected to the assembly in 1897:

Member	Electoral district	Affiliation	First elected / previously elected
Abram Kean	Bay de Verde	Tory	1885, 1897
W. P. Rogerson	Bay de Verde	Tory	1897
Darius Blandford	Bonavista	Tory	1893
John Cowan	Bonavista	Tory	1897
John A. Robinson (1897)	Bonavista	Tory	1897
Alfred B. Morine (1897)	Bonavista	Tory	1886, 1897
Henry Y. Mott	Burgeo-La Poile	Tory	1894
James S. Winter	Burin	Tory	1873, 1892, 1897
John E. Lake	Burin	Tory	1897
William Duff	Carbonear	Liberal	1889
Michael P. Cashin	Ferryland	Liberal	1893
George Shea	Ferryland	Tory	1885, 1897
Thomas C. Duder	Fogo	Tory	1893
H. R. Hayward	Fortune Bay	Tory	1897
Charles Way (1899)	Fortune Bay	Tory	1899
William H. Horwood	Harbour Grace	Liberal	1894
Eli Dawe	Harbour Grace	Liberal	1889
William A. Oke	Harbour Grace	Liberal	1897
J. J. St. John	Harbour Main	Tory	1897
William Woodford	Harbour Main	Tory	1889
William J. S. Donnelly	Placentia and St. Mary's	Tory	1893
Rhodie Callahan	Placentia and St. Mary's	Tory	1897
Michael H. Carty	Placentia and St. Mary's	Tory	1897
Richard T. McGrath (1899)	Placentia and St. Mary's	Tory	1894, 1899
Charles Dawe	Port de Grave	Tory	1893
Albert Bradshaw	St. Barbe	Tory	1882, 1897
Michael P. Gibbs	St. George's	Tory	1897
John P. Fox	St. John's East	Liberal	1894
Thomas J. Murphy	St. John's East	Liberal	1886
Lawrence O'Brien Furlong	St. John's East	Liberal	1893
Edward Morris	St. John's West	Liberal	1885
James C. Tessier	St. John's West	Liberal	1893
James J. Callanan	St. John's West	Liberal	1882, 1897
Robert S. Bremner	Trinity	Tory	1897
Robert Watson	Trinity	Tory	1897
Levi March	Trinity	Tory	1897
John A. Robinson (1898)	Trinity	Tory	1898
Robert Bond	Twillingate	Liberal	1882
Donald Browning	Twillingate	Liberal	1897
Alan Goodridge	Twillingate	Tory	1897

== By-elections ==
By-elections were held to replace members for various reasons:

Electoral district	Member elected	Affiliation	Election date	Reason
Burin	James Spearman Winter (Note: Elected by acclamation)	Tory	November 29, 1897	JS Winter named to cabinet; required to run for reelection
Fogo	Thomas C. Duder	Tory	November 29, 1897	TC Duder named to cabinet; required to run for reelection
Harbour Main	William Woodford	Tory	November 29, 1897	W Woodford named to cabinet; required to run for reelection
Bonavista	Alfred B. Morine	Tory	November 29, 1897	JA Robinson named to Legislative Council
Trinity	John A. Robinson	Tory	April 29, 1898	L March resigned seat
Placentia and St. Mary's	Richard T. McGrath	Liberal	May 25, 1899	WJS Donnelly named to cabinet; required to run for reelection
Fortune Bay	Charles Way	Liberal	1899	H R Hayward died June 13, 1899
