= 19th General Assembly of Newfoundland =

Colony of Newfoundland legislature

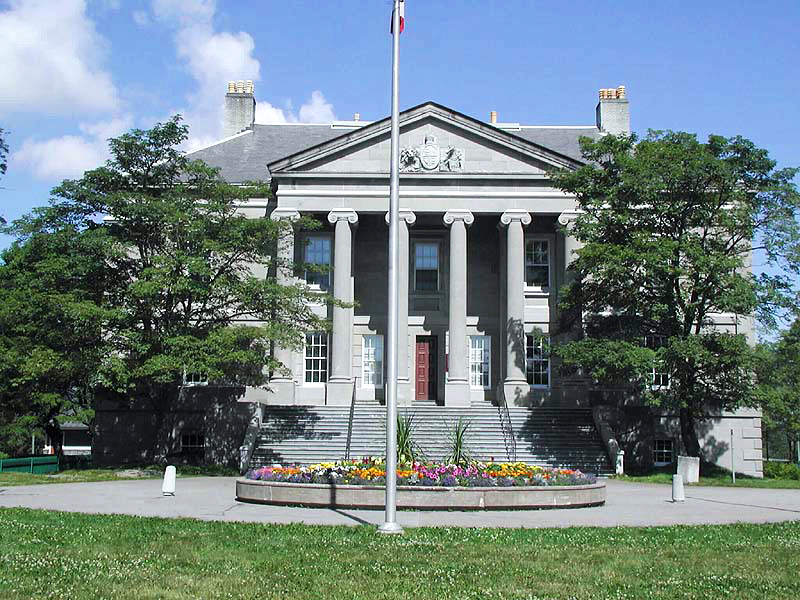
- Colonial Building seat of the Newfoundland government and the House of Assembly from January 28, 1850, to July 28, 1959.

History
- Founded: 1901
- Disbanded: 1904
- Preceded by: 18th General Assembly of Newfoundland
- Succeeded by: 20th General Assembly of Newfoundland

Leadership
- Premier: Robert Bond

Elections
- Last election: 1900 Newfoundland general election

The members of the 19th General Assembly of Newfoundland were elected in the Newfoundland general election held in November 1900. The general assembly sat from 1901 to 1904.

The Liberal Party led by Robert Bond formed the government.

Lawrence Furlong was chosen as speaker.

Sir Charles Cavendish Boyle served as colonial governor of Newfoundland.

== Members of the Assembly ==
The following members were elected to the assembly in 1900:

Member	Electoral district	Affiliation	First elected / previously elected
Henry J. B. Woods	Bay de Verde	Liberal	1889, 1900
Michael T. Knight	Bay de Verde	Liberal	1885, 1893, 1900
Edward Morris	Bay de Verde	Liberal	1885
Isaac Mercer (1902)	Bay de Verde	Liberal	1902
Alfred B. Morine	Bonavista	Tory	1886
Darius Blandford	Bonavista	Tory	1893
Mark Chaplin	Bonavista	Tory	1900
Charles Emerson	Burgeo-La Poile	Liberal	1900
Henry Gear	Burin	Liberal	1894, 1900
Edward H. Davey	Burin	Liberal	1900
Joseph Maddock	Carbonear	Liberal	1900
Michael P. Cashin	Ferryland	Liberal	1893
J. D. Ryan	Ferryland	Liberal	1900
Henry Earle	Fogo	Liberal	1900
Charles Way	Fortune Bay	Liberal	1899
Eli Dawe	Harbour Grace	Liberal	1889
A. W. Harvey	Harbour Grace	Liberal	1900
William A. Oke	Harbour Grace	Liberal	1897
Frank J. Morris	Harbour Main	Liberal	1889, 1900
J. J. St. John	Harbour Main	Liberal	1897
E. M. Jackman	Placentia and St. Mary's	Liberal	1900
Thomas Bonia	Placentia and St. Mary's	Liberal	1900
Richard T. McGrath	Placentia and St. Mary's	Liberal	1894, 1899
A. M. McKay	Port de Grave	Tory	1878, 1900
Alexander Parsons	St. Barbe	Liberal	1893, 1900
William R. Howley	St. George's	Liberal	1900
John Dwyer	St. John's East	Liberal	1900
Lawrence O'Brien Furlong	St. John's East	Liberal	1893
Thomas J. Murphy	St. John's East	Liberal	1886
Edward Morris	St. John's West	Liberal	1885
John Anderson	St. John's West	Liberal	1900
John Scott	St. John's West	Liberal	1900
George W. Gushue	Trinity	Liberal	1894, 1900
George M. Johnson	Trinity	Liberal	1894, 1900
William H. Horwood	Trinity	Liberal	1894
William Warren (1902)	Trinity	Tory	1902
Robert Watson (1902)	Trinity	Tory	1897, 1902
Robert Bond	Twillingate	Liberal	1882
James A. Clift	Twillingate	Liberal	1889, 1900
George Roberts	Twillingate	Liberal	1900

== By-elections ==
By-elections were held to replace members for various reasons:

Electoral district	Member elected	Affiliation	Election date	Reason
Trinity	Robert Watson	Tory	1902	GM Johnson named to Supreme Court
Trinity	William Warren	Tory	1902	W Horwood named to Supreme Court
Bay de Verde	Isaac Mercer	Liberal	1902	HJB Woods named Postmaster General
St. John's West	Edward Morris (Note: Elected by acclamation)	Liberal	1903	E Morris named to cabinet; required to run for reelection
