= 1913 Newfoundland general election =

Election in the Dominion of Newfoundland

- October 30, 1913

36 seats of the Newfoundland House of Assembly 19 seats needed for a majority
- Turnout: 79.21% (▲1.40pp)
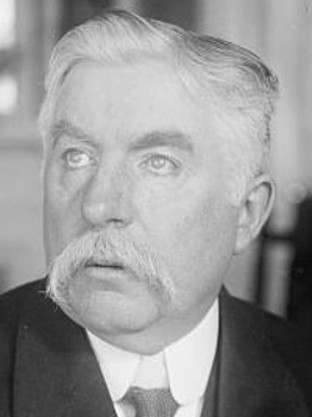

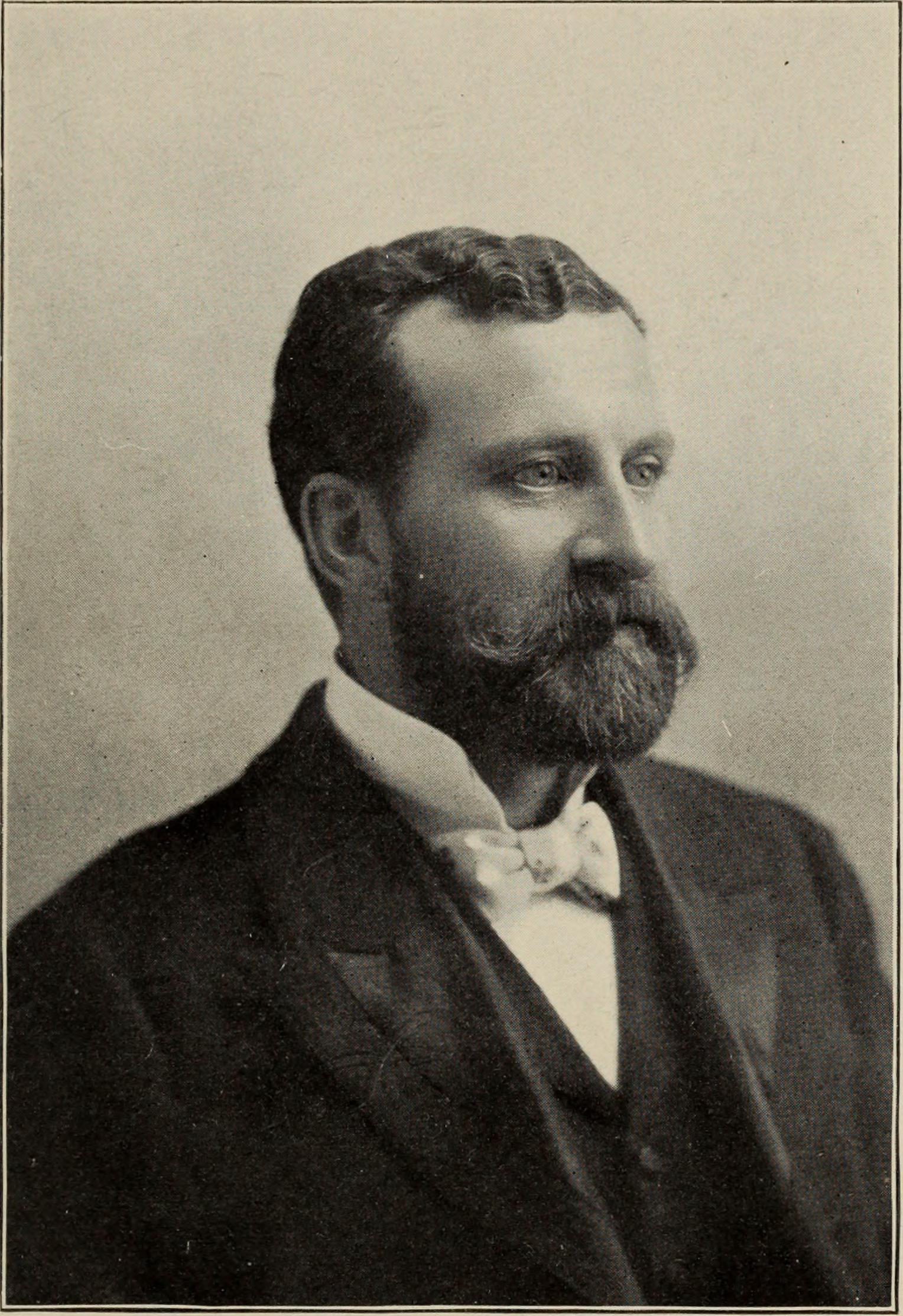

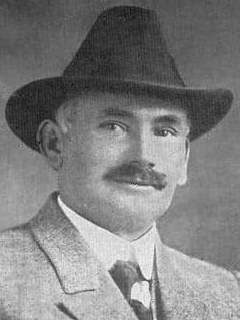
	First party	Second party
Leader	Edward Morris	Robert Bond and William Coaker
Party	People's	Liberal-Unionist
Leader since	1908	1897 / 1908
Leader's seat	St. John's West	Twillingate / Bonavista Bay (Note: Not the incumbent, but stood in this district and won)
Last election	26 seats, 52.89%	10 seats, 47.11% (Note: As the Liberal Party)
Seats won	21	15
Seat change	▼5	▲5
Popular vote	51,451	61,362
Percentage	45.55%	54.32%
Swing	▼2.52%	▲2.39%
- Results by district
Prime Minister before election
Edward Morris
People's
Prime Minister after election
Edward Morris
People's

The 1913 Newfoundland general election was held on October 30, 1913 to elect members of the 23rd General Assembly of Newfoundland in the Dominion of Newfoundland. The Liberal Party led by Robert Bond formed a coalition with the Fishermen's Protective Union led by William Coaker. Although the majority held by the Newfoundland People's Party was reduced in this election, it was again returned to power and Edward P. Morris continued to serve as Prime Minister of Newfoundland. A general election originally scheduled for 1917 was deferred until 1919 because of World War I. After Morris retired from politics in 1918, William F. Lloyd, a Liberal member of the Executive Council, was asked to form a government. In May 1919, Michael Patrick Cashin, the leader of the People's Party, introduced a motion of no confidence which resulted in the defeat of the government. Cashin served as Newfoundland prime minister until the election held later in 1919.

== Results ==
Party	Leader	1909	Candidates	Seats won	Seat change	% of seats (% change)	Popular vote	% of vote (% change)
People's	Edward Morris	26	36	21	▼5	58.33% (▼13.89%)	51,451	45.55% (▼2.52%)
Liberal (Note: Campaigned as the Liberal-Unionist Party)	Robert Bond	10	36; Liberal 27; FPU 9	15; FPU 8 Liberal 7	▲5	41.67% (▲13.89%)	61,362; Liberal 39,228; FPU 22,134	54.32% (▲2.39%)
Fishermen's Protective Union	William Coaker	–	36; Liberal 27; FPU 9	15; FPU 8 Liberal 7	▲5	41.67% (▲13.89%)	61,362; Liberal 39,228; FPU 22,134	54.32% (▲2.39%)
Other		0	1	0	Steady	0.00%	153	0.14% (▲0.14%)
Totals		36	73	36	Steady	100%	112,966 (Note: This figure includes votes cast for more than one candidate in multi-member districts. A total of 49,010 individual votes were cast in this election.)	100%

== Results by district ==
- Names in **boldface type** represent party leaders.
- † indicates that the incumbent did not run again.
- ‡ indicates that the incumbent ran in a different district.

=== St. John's ===
Electoral district	Candidates		Incumbent
Electoral district	People's	Liberal (historical)	Incumbent
St. John's East; 83.98% turnout	William Higgins; 2,660; 17.29%	James Kent; 2,835; 18.43%	James Kent
St. John's East; 83.98% turnout	William Howley; 2,443; 15.88%	John Dwyer; 2,609; 16.96%	George Shea†
St. John's East; 83.98% turnout	Henry Bartlett; 2,306; 14.99%	Charles Ryan; 2,533; 16.46%	John Dwyer
St. John's West; 90.02% turnout	**Edward Morris**; 2,749; 21.25%	William Ellis; 1,738; 13.43%	**Edward Morris**
St. John's West; 90.02% turnout	John R. Bennett; 2,643; 20.43%	Henry Cowan; 1,719; 13.29%	John R. Bennett
St. John's West; 90.02% turnout	Michael Kennedy; 2,545; 19.67%	John Scott; 1,545; 11.94%	Michael Kennedy

=== Conception Bay ===
Electoral district	Candidates		Incumbent
Electoral district	People's	Liberal (historical)	Incumbent
Bay de Verde; 85.82% turnout	John Crosbie; 1,150; 25.35%	Albert Hickman (Note: According to a 1934 Fishermen's Advocate article, the FPU had intended to run Allan Hudson as their other candidate for the Bay de Verde district. They agreed to let Liberal candidate Albert Hickman run in Hudson's place as part of the Liberal-Union electoral alliance.); 1,168; 25.75%	John Crosbie
Bay de Verde; 85.82% turnout	Jesse Whiteway; 1,078; 23.77%	Nathan Barrett (FPU); 1,140; 25.13%	Jesse Whiteway
Carbonear; 82.57% turnout	John Goodison; 608; 53.24%	William Penney; 534; 46.76%	John Goodison
Harbour Grace; 85.40% turnout	Archibald Piccott; 1,444; 18.71%	George A. Gosse; 1,200; 15.55%	Archibald Piccott
Harbour Grace; 85.40% turnout	Edward Parsons; 1,374; 17.81%	George Gordon; 1,187; 15.38%	Vacant (Note: Alfred Seymour was elected in 1909, but he died while in office on May 11, 1912.)
Harbour Grace; 85.40% turnout	Moses Young; 1,342; 17.39%	Harris Mosdell; 1,169; 15.15%	Edward Parsons
Harbour Main; 78.55% turnout	William Woodford; 1,178; 29.64%	John Lewis; 904; 22.75%	William Woodford
Harbour Main; 78.55% turnout	George Kennedy; 1,116; 28.08%	Leo Carter; 776; 19.53%	John J. Murphy†
Port de Grave; 81.33% turnout	William Warren; 697; 44.45%	George Grimes (FPU); 871; 55.55%	William Warren

=== Avalon Peninsula ===
Electoral district	Candidates			Incumbent
Electoral district	People's	Liberal (historical)	Other	Incumbent
Ferryland; 93.54% turnout	Michael Cashin; 1,095; 40.02%	Michael Hartery; 303; 11.07%	Michael Condon (Independent); 153; 5.59%	Michael Cashin
Ferryland; 93.54% turnout	Philip Moore; 918; 33.55%	Fred Williams; 267; 9.76%	Michael Condon (Independent); 153; 5.59%	Philip Moore
Placentia and St. Mary's; 77.59% turnout	Richard Devereaux; 2,023; 20.58%	Michael Sullivan; 1,544; 15.70%		Richard Devereaux
Placentia and St. Mary's; 77.59% turnout	Frank Morris; 1,953; 19.86%	Patrick Summers; 1,300; 13.22%		William Howley‡ (ran in St. John's East)
Placentia and St. Mary's; 77.59% turnout	William Walsh; 1,758; 17.88%	George Carty; 1,254; 12.75%		Frank Morris

=== Eastern Newfoundland ===
Electoral district	Candidates		Incumbent
Electoral district	People's	FPU	Incumbent
Bonavista Bay; 74.97% turnout	Sydney Blandford; 1,624; 11.04%	**William Coaker**; 3,473; 23.61%	Sydney Blandford
Bonavista Bay; 74.97% turnout	William C. Winsor; 1,515; 10.30%	Robert G. Winsor; 3,313; 22.52%	William C. Winsor
Bonavista Bay; 74.97% turnout	Donald Morison; 1,477; 10.04%	John Abbott; 3,308; 22.49%	Donald Morison
Trinity Bay; 77.08% turnout	Richard Squires; 1,678; 13.39%	John Stone; 2,685; 21.42%	Richard Squires
Trinity Bay; 77.08% turnout	Richard Fowlow; 1,510; 12.05%	Archibald Targett; 2,608; 20.81%	Robert Watson†
Trinity Bay; 77.08% turnout	Brian Dunfield; 1,462; 11.66%	William Lloyd (Liberal) (Note: According to a 1934 Fishermen's Advocate article, the FPU had intended to run John Loder as their other candidate for the Trinity district. They agreed to let Liberal candidate William Lloyd run in Loder's place as part of the Liberal-Union electoral alliance.); 2,592; 20.68%	Edwin Grant†

=== Central Newfoundland ===
Electoral district	Candidates		Incumbent
Electoral district	People's	Liberal (historical)	Incumbent
Fogo; 83.20% turnout	Henry Fitzgerald; 594; 30.76%	William Halfyard (FPU); 1,337; 69.24%	Henry Earle†
Twillingate; 73.84% turnout	Jordan Milley; 887; 7.03%	**Robert Bond** (Note: According to a 1934 Fishermen's Advocate article, the FPU had intended to run Martin Phillips as one of the two other candidates for the Twillingate district. They agreed to let Liberal leader Robert Bond run in Phillips' place as part of the Liberal-Union electoral alliance.); 3,481; 27.57%	**Robert Bond**
Twillingate; 73.84% turnout	William Temple; 734; 5.81%	James Clift (Note: According to a 1934 Fishermen's Advocate article, the FPU had intended to run Adolph Yates as one of the other candidates for the Twillingate district. They agreed to let Liberal incumbent James Clift run in Yates' place as part of the Liberal-Union electoral alliance. Yates would ultimately run as a People's Party candidate.); 3,427; 27.14%	James Clift
Twillingate; 73.84% turnout	Adolphus Yates; 698; 5.53%	Walter Jennings (FPU); 3,399; 26.92%	George Roberts†

=== Southern and Western Newfoundland ===
Electoral district	Candidates		Incumbent
Electoral district	People's	Liberal (historical)	Incumbent
Burgeo and LaPoile; 75.73% turnout	Robert Moulton; 760; 51.08%	Charles James; 728; 48.92%	Robert Moulton
Burin; 73.22% turnout	John Currie; 1,200; 30.76%	George Bartlett; 786; 20.15%	Henry Gear
Burin; 73.22% turnout	Thomas LeFeuvre; 1,174; 30.09%	Henry Gear; 741; 19.00%	Thomas LeFeuvre
Fortune Bay; 71.62% turnout	Charles Emerson; 1,000; 53.62%	Randall Fudge; 865; 46.38%	Charles Emerson
St. Barbe; 79.43% turnout	Henry Mott; 871; 41.01%	William Clapp (Note: According to a 1934 Fishermen's Advocate article, the FPU had intended to run a Mr. Alcock as their candidate for the St. Barbe district. They agreed to let Liberal incumbent William Clapp run in Alcock's place as part of the Liberal-Union electoral alliance.); 1,253; 58.99%	William Clapp
St. George's; 66.95% turnout	Joseph Downey; 1,187; 60.65%	Arthur English; 770; 39.35%	Joseph Downey
