= Thomas Peyton (Newfoundland politician) =

Newfoundland politician (1828–1912)

Member of the Newfoundland House of Assembly for Twillingate
- In office November 6, 1889 – November 6, 1893 Serving with Edward P. Burgess and Jabez P. Thompson
- Preceded by: Augustus F. Goodridge; Smith McKay; Michael T. Knight
- Succeeded by: Augustus F. Goodridge; Michael T. Knight
- Majority: 319 (5.67%)

Personal details
- Born: c. 1828 Exploits, Newfoundland Colony
- Died: September 5, 1912 (aged 83–84) Twillingate, Newfoundland
- Party: Liberal
- Spouse: Mary Ann Pearce (m. 1858)
- Relatives: Georgina Stirling (niece)
- Occupation: Civil servant

Thomas Peyton (c. 1828 – September 5, 1912) was a fisherman, civil servant and politician in Newfoundland. He represented Twillingate in the Newfoundland House of Assembly from 1889 to 1893 as a Liberal.

== Early life and family ==
Peyton was born in Exploits, Burnt Island, the son of John Peyton Jr. and Eleanor Mahaney. He married Mary Ann Pearce of Twillingate on May 28, 1858. His son Ernest was the first Newfoundland member of the Royal North-West Mounted Police. His niece, Georgina Stirling, was an opera singer known as the "Nightingale of the North".

== Civil service ==
Peyton managed the family salmon fishery on the Exploits River. He was a justice of the peace and also served as a deputy land surveyor on the geological survey of Newfoundland by Alexander Murray. Peyton was briefly magistrate at Pilley's Island and served as fishery warden on rivers on Notre Dame Bay. He is credited with the discovery of copper deposits at Green Bay in 1875.

Peyton was elected to the House of Assembly in 1889 as a Liberal supporter of Premier William Whiteway. He chose not to seek re-election in 1893.

Peyton died at Twillingate on September 5, 1912.
