= Alan Goodridge =

Newfoundland politician (1872–1927)

The Honourable Captain Alan C. Goodridge MHA

Minister of Finance and Customs
- In office January 1900 – February 19, 1900
- Premier: James S. Winter
- Preceded by: George Shea
- Succeeded by: Edward M. Jackman

Minister without portfolio
- In office 1898 – January 1900
- Premier: James S. Winter

Member of the Newfoundland House of Assembly for Twillingate
- In office October 28, 1897 – November 8, 1900 Serving with Donald Browning (1897–1899); Robert Bond (1897–1900)
- Preceded by: Giles Foote; Augustus F. Goodridge; Michael T. Knight
- Succeeded by: James A. Clift; George Roberts

Personal details
- Born: Alan Churchward Goodridge; October 12, 1871 St. John's, Newfoundland Colony
- Died: May 14, 1927 (aged 55) St. John's, Newfoundland
- Party: Conservative (1897–1907); People's (1907–1909)
- Spouse: Mary G. McNeil (m. 1904)
- Children: 1 son
- Relatives: Augustus F. Goodridge (uncle)
- Education: Bishop Feild College; Clifton College
- Occupation: Businessman

Alan Churchward Goodridge (October 12, 1871 – May 14, 1927) was a Newfoundland businessman and politician. As a member of the Conservative Party supporting premier James S. Winter, Goodridge was the member of the Newfoundland House of Assembly (MHA) for Twillingate from 1897 to 1900. He was also a commissioned officer for the Royal Newfoundland Regiment during World War I.

== Early life and business career ==
Goodridge was born to a prominent merchant family in St. John's as the son of Henry Churchward Goodridge and Rosina E. Goodridge. He initially attended the local Bishop Feild College before traveling overseas to study at Clifton College in Bristol, England. After graduating, Goodridge returned to St. John's to work in the family mercantile firm, Alan Goodridge and Sons, where he saw himself stationed at the company's branch in Nipper's Harbour. He married Mary "Mollie" McNeil on June 16, 1904.

== Politics ==
Goodridge entered politics in the 1897 general election when he successfully ran for one of the House of Assembly seats in the district of Twillingate as a Conservative supporter of incoming premier James S. Winter. Soon after his election, he was appointed by Premier Winter as the Newfoundland Colony's trade commissioner to the Mediterranean. In 1898, he was promoted to cabinet as a minister without portfolio. Amidst the collapse of the Conservative government, Goodridge was briefly given the portfolio of Finance and Customs by Premier Winter before the administration was defeated in a vote of no confidence. He subsequently lost his seat in the 1900 general election.

Goodridge attempted to re-enter the House of Assembly three times in 1904, 1908, and 1909, but he lost each election to Liberal candidates led by the popular premier Robert Bond. In lieu of a legislative seat, Goodridge worked with the colonial office as an honorary aide-de-camp to the Governor of Newfoundland from 1904 to 1913. When the conservative People's Party assumed power in 1909, premier Edward Morris gave Goodridge the appointment of Deputy Minister of Marine and Fisheries, which he retained for much of the rest of his public career. In 1920, Goodridge briefly became the Dominion of Newfoundland's trade commissioner to Liverpool before returning to St. John's the following year.

== Military career ==
A founding member and commission officer of the St. John's branch of the Church Lads' Brigade, Goodridge became the registrar of the Newfoundland Royal Naval Reserve in 1909. At the commencement of the First World War, he was commissioned as a Captain in the Newfoundland Regiment, and he served as the military aide-de-camp to Governor Walter Davidson. Goodridge received commendations by the lords commissioners of the Admiralty for his command of the Royal Naval Reserve troops on board the SS Mongolian.

Goodridge died in St. John's on May 14, 1927.
