= Solomon Samson =

Newfoundland educator and politician (1885–1957)

Member of the Newfoundland House of Assembly for Twillingate
- In office November 3, 1919 – May 3, 1923 Serving with Walter Jennings and George Jones
- Preceded by: William Coaker; James A. Clift
- Succeeded by: Kenneth M. Brown; Arthur Barnes

Personal details
- Born: August 10, 1885 Flat Islands, Bonavista Bay, Newfoundland Colony
- Died: February 14, 1957 (aged 71) St. John's, Newfoundland, Canada
- Party: Fishermen's Protective Union
- Occupation: Teacher

Solomon Samson (August 10, 1885 – February 14, 1957) was an educator, civil servant and politician in Newfoundland. He represented Twillingate in the Newfoundland House of Assembly from 1919 to 1923.

He was born in Flat Islands, Bonavista Bay and worked as a teacher in Catalina and Greenspond. In 1923, he was appointed to a position in the Customs department and moved to St. John's. He began writing poetry later in life and published a small volume of poems in 1952.

== Works ==
- Glimpse of Newfoundland (as it was and as it is) in Poetry and Pictures
