= Augustus William Harvey =

Newfoundland industrialist and politician (1839–1903)

The Honourable A. W. Harvey MHA
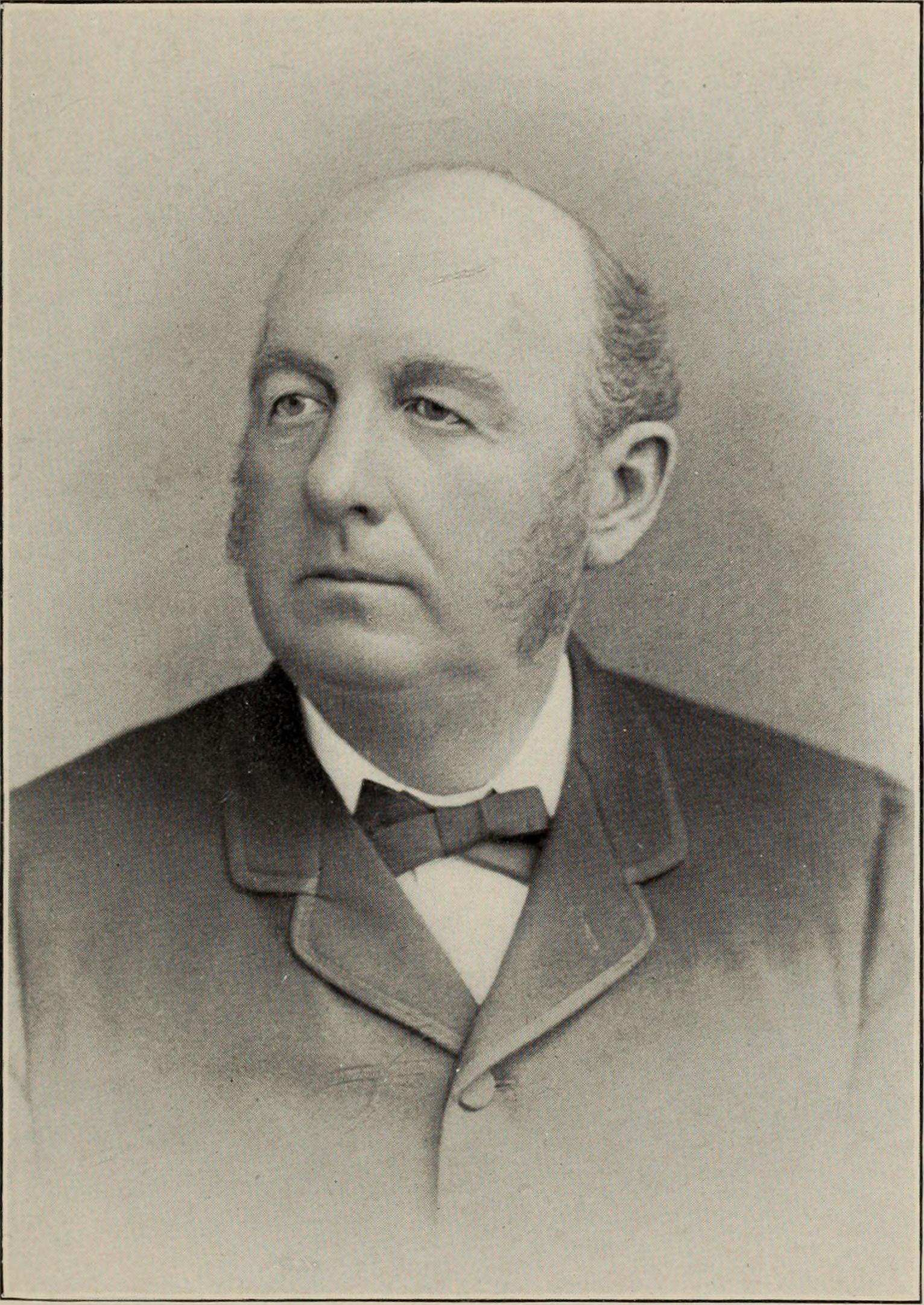

Member of the Newfoundland House of Assembly for Harbour Grace
- In office November 8, 1900 – February 7, 1903 Serving with Eli Dawe and William Oke
- Preceded by: William Horwood
- Succeeded by: Arthur Barnes

Member of the Legislative Council of Newfoundland
- In office February 14, 1870 – December 1895
- Nominated by: Charles Fox Bennett
- Appointed by: Stephen John Hill

Personal details
- Born: Augustus William Harvey; May 31, 1839 Bermuda
- Died: February 7, 1903 (aged 63) St. John's, Newfoundland
- Party: Liberal
- Spouse: Elizabeth Walker (m. 1864)
- Children: 6
- Education: University of Pennsylvania
- Occupation: Businessman

Augustus William Harvey (May 31, 1839 – February 7, 1903) was a Bermudan-born industrialist, politician, and philanthropist in Newfoundland. He served in the Legislative Council of Newfoundland from 1870 to 1895 and represented Harbour Grace in the Newfoundland House of Assembly from 1900 to 1903 as a Liberal.

== Business career ==
Harvey was born in Bermuda to a family involved in trade with Newfoundland. After graduating from the University of Pennsylvania, he moved to St. John's, Newfoundland in 1853. In 1861, he joined Dunscombe, Harvey and Company, later known as Harvey and Company, which was partly owned by his uncle Eugenius Harvey. When his uncle left, he became managing partner. Harvey then married Elizabeth Walker in 1864, with whom he had six children.

Originally a fishery supply business, Harvey and Company began promoting domestic land-based industry like mining, lumber and manufacturing in the 1870's. Harvey's business interests expanded to include tobacco, furniture, and bread and biscuit factories. He was also a partner in A. Harvey and Company and the New York, Newfoundland and Halifax Steamship Company. In 1894, he became an agent for the Dominion Coal Company of Cape Breton. Harvey established the Cabot Steam Whaling Company in 1896.

== Politics ==
Harvey was an opponent of Newfoundland's Confederation with Canada, and he campaigned for Charles Fox Bennett's Anti-Confederation Party in the 1869 general election. Bennett named him to the Legislative Council of Newfoundland the following year. He emerged as a significant supporter of William Whiteway's railway policy.

In 1887, Premier Robert Thorburn appointed Harvey as the chairman of a commission to investigate the establishment of a fisheries department in Newfoundland comparable to that of Canada, the United States, or Norway. After recommending the establishment of a permanent Fisheries Commission, Harvey was made its first chairman, and he entered into the Executive Council of Premier Whiteway in 1889 as a representative of the fisheries. In this position, he successfully convinced the government in Spain to reduce the tariffs it placed on Newfoundland fish. The commission was elevated into the Department of Fisheries in 1893.

Harvey suffered a major loss in the 1894 bank crash as a director of the Newfoundland Union Bank, and he resigned from both the Legislative Council and the cabinet in December 1895. He re-entered politics after being elected to the House of Assembly in 1900, and he served in the cabinet of Robert Bond as a minister without portfolio.

== Philanthropy ==
Harvey helped establish the Fishermen and Sailors' Home in 1886. He was also a member of the committee set up to help Doctor Wilfred Grenfell provide medical care in Labrador.

Harvey died in St. John's at the age of 63.
