= William Duff (Newfoundland politician) =

Canadian politician

William Duff Sr. MHA
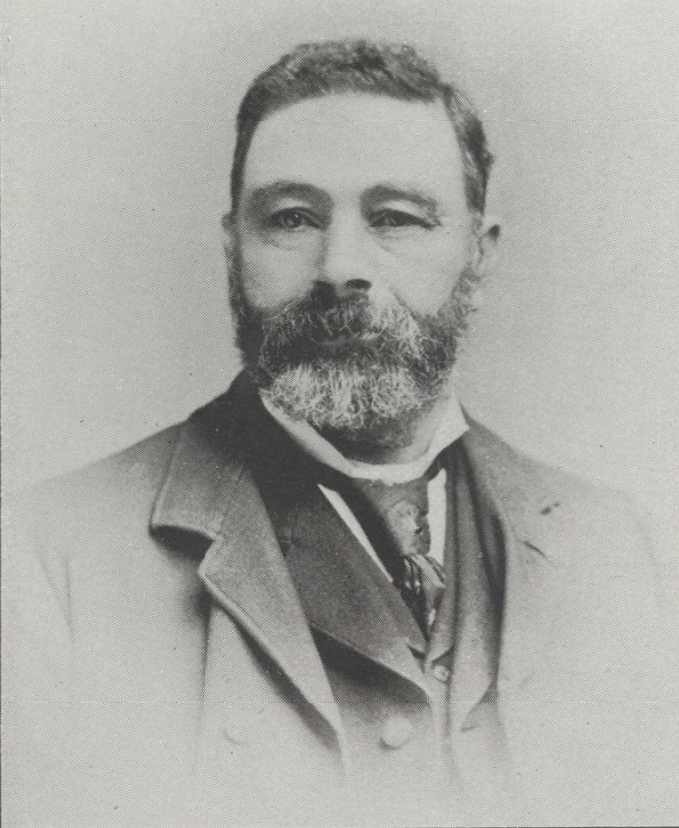
- William Duff Sr.

Member of the Newfoundland House of Assembly for Carbonear
- In office 1889–1900
- Monarch: Queen Victoria
- Premier: William Whiteway; Augustus F. Goodridge; Daniel Joseph Greene; William Whiteway; James Spearman Winter
- Preceded by: Alfred Penney
- Succeeded by: Joseph Maddock

Personal details
- Born: William Duff; 22 July 1842 Bothkennar, United Kingdom of Great Britain and Ireland
- Died: 18 February 1913 (aged 70) Carbonear, Dominion of Newfoundland
- Party: Liberal
- Spouse: Mary Ann Thompson
- Children: William Duff Jr.; Robert Duff
- Occupation: Politician, Businessman

William Duff Sr. (July 22, 1842 – February 18, 1913) was a Scottish-born businessman and politician in Newfoundland. He represented Carbonear in the Newfoundland House of Assembly from 1889 to 1900.

He was born in Bothkennar, Stirlingshire and was educated in Falkirk. Duff came to Newfoundland as a clerk for a firm in Harbour Grace. In 1886, he went into business in partnership with Robert Balmer; after Balmer retired, Duff became sole owner. He married Mary Ann Thompson. In 1893, Duff was named governor for the savings bank. He died in Carbonear at the age of 70.

His son William later served in the Canadian House of Commons and in the Canadian Senate.
