= Walter Jennings (politician) =

Fisherman and politician in Newfoundland

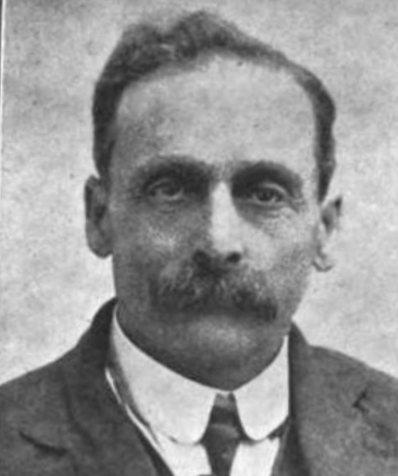

Member of the Newfoundland House of Assembly for Twillingate
- In office October 30, 1913 – May 3, 1923 Serving with Robert Bond (1913–14); James A. Clift (1913–19); William Coaker (1914–19); George Jones (1919–23); Solomon Samson (1919–23)
- Preceded by: George Roberts
- Succeeded by: Kenneth M. Brown; Arthur Barnes

Personal details
- Born: Walter Baine Jennings; March 16, 1864 Western Head, Notre Dame Bay, Newfoundland Colony
- Died: November 1, 1942 (aged 78) Windsor, Ontario
- Party: Fishermen's Protective Union
- Spouse: Isabella W. Holmes (m. 1895)
- Children: 3
- Occupation: Fisherman

Walter Baine Jennings (March 16, 1864 – November 1, 1942) was a fisherman and politician in Newfoundland. He represented Twillingate in the Newfoundland House of Assembly from 1913 to 1923. Jennings was the first member of the Salvation Army to sit in the Newfoundland assembly.

== Biography ==
The son of Samuel Jennings and Joanna Cull, he was born in Western Head, Notre Dame Bay. Jennings married Isabella W. Holmes in November 1895 and they had three sons. He joined the Fishermen's Protective Union in 1909 and became chairman of the district council. In 1912, Jennings became manager of the Fisherman's Union Trading Company store. He was elected to the Newfoundland assembly in 1913 and again in 1919. From 1919 to 1923, he was Minister of Public Works, which was not a cabinet post at the time. Jennings did not run for reelection in 1923. He later became manager of the wholesale stamp department of the St. John's post office. Jennings retired to Windsor, Ontario in the late 1920s. He died there on November 1, 1942.
