= William Oke =

Newfoundland politician (1857–1923)

William Oke MHA

Member of the Newfoundland House of Assembly for Harbour Grace
- In office October 28, 1897 – November 2, 1908 Serving with: Eli Dawe (1897−1908); William Horwood (1897−1900); Augustus Harvey (1900−1903); Arthur Barnes (1904−1908)
- Preceded by: Henry Dawe; William Whiteway
- Succeeded by: Edward Parsons; Archibald Piccott

Personal details
- Born: William Austin Oke; December 14, 1857 Harbour Grace, Newfoundland Colony
- Died: February 24, 1923 (aged 65) Harbour Grace, Newfoundland
- Party: Liberal
- Spouse: Sophia Lilla Snow (m. 1890)
- Children: 2
- Relatives: Robert Oke (grandfather)
- Occupation: Newspaper publisher

William Austin Oke (December 14, 1857 – February 24, 1923) was a newspaper publisher, politician and District Court judge in Newfoundland. He represented Harbour Grace in the Newfoundland House of Assembly for three terms, from 1897 to 1908, as a Liberal.

== Early life ==
Oke was born December 14, 1857 in Harbour Grace, the grandson of Robert Oke, the first Chief Inspector, Newfoundland Lighthouse Service, and the son of Edward Langdon Oke, II (1825–1862) and Frances Walsh (1830–1881). His father was a harbor pilot, a lighthouse keeper on Harbour Grace Island in Conception Bay, and he became a local legend as the winning coxwain in the whaleboat race in 1859 that inspired the annual regatta in Harbour Grace. Oke was 4 years old and the youngest of four siblings when his father drowned with Nathaniel Snow (assistant lighthouse keeper) after they fell through the ice near Salvage Rock while traveling to the lighthouse in February 1862. Oke's mother, "Fanny", raised her young family by operating a variety store in town but was in poor health and remained an invalid for the last 19 years of her life.

== Newspaper career ==
From the age of 13 or 14, Oke apprenticed as a printer with Robert Thomas Squarey, who had taken over as editor from William Squarey, of the Harbor Grace Standard and Conception Bay Advertiser. After three years, Oke was promoted to foreman. On March 5, 1873, the newspaper was purchased by Archibald Munn (1814–1877), who as publisher and editor, moved the business to Water Street East. After Munn's death, his son, John F. Munn ran the publishing business. Oke took over the positions of business manager and publisher and became part owner with Munn when the business changed to Munn & Oke, Ltd. on May 23, 1888. The newspaper title was shortened to Harbor Grace Standard.

In March 1909, after Oke recused himself as an editor and publisher, Sophia Oke as trustee for their son Edward Langdon Oke, IV (1893–1966) or 'Ned' (a minor), and the estate of J. F. Munn became the publishers and proprietors of the Standard. At the time of Oke's death in 1923, Ned was the proprietor of the Standard. Although Ned was sole printer, publisher and Chief Editor, he filed an affidavit to retain the business registration and proprietorship as Munn & Oke, Ltd. After the newspaper ceased publication in 1936, the business relied on commercial printing and lithographic services, shepherded eventually by Ned's son, William Austin Oke, II (1930–2005). The "Washington" press equipment, manufactured by R. Hoe & Company, used to print the Standard, was still being used by Munn & Oke, Ltd. to print posters when Memorial University of Newfoundland purchased it in 1962 and named it "Pitcher Plant Press". Thus, three generations of Oke family hand-operated the historic iron printing press that was used in Newfoundland for more than a century (1850 to 1962). The press is on display in the Queen Elizabeth II Library (MUN, St. John's, NL).

== Political career ==
Oke's entrance into politics was in the October 1897 Newfoundland general election, running as a liberal under William Whiteway, he won a seat from 1898 to 1900 in the 18th General Assembly of Newfoundland, led by the opposition Tory Party of James Spearman Winter (1845–1911). Oke continued as a member of The Liberal Party, then led by Sir Robert Bond (1857–1927) after the Newfoundland general election, held on 8 November 1900, and sat in the 19th General Assembly of Newfoundland, from 1901 to 1904. Oke succeeded again in election to the 20th General Assembly of Newfoundland and sat from 1905 to 1908. In 1907, Britain changed the structure of the self-governing British colony, conferring dominion status to Newfoundland by Royal Proclamation. At this time, minister of justice Edward Patrick Morris resigned from the cabinet and formed the Newfoundland People's Party, which ran against the liberals in the Newfoundland general election, held in 1908. Oke and five other candidates ran in a close election for the three Member House Assembly seats for the Harbour Grace District but he was unsuccessful in seeking a fourth term.

== Judicial career ==
In 1905, Oke was appointed Justice of the Peace and Notary Public for the Colony. In February 1909, the Governor in Council appointed Oke to be Stipendiary Magistrate for the Northern District of Newfoundland and Judge of the Harbour Grace District Court in place of Alfred Henry Seymour (1855–1912), who was elected to represent Harbour Grace in the Newfoundland House of Assembly. Given this new position, Oke recused himself as a publisher. Until his death in 1923, Oke served as one of the two District Court judges in Newfoundland; the District Court in Harbour Grace was abolished in 1935. By 1913, Oke was appointed as a Commissioner of the Supreme Court of Newfoundland, authorized to take affidavits for any cause pending in the Supreme Court and empowered to issue Original or Mesne Process. The Harbour Grace Court House where Judge Oke served is the oldest surviving public building in Newfoundland and one of the National Historic Sites of Canada.

== Community service ==
Oke was a member of the Board of Education for the District of Harbor Grace, was president of the Harbor Grace Literary Institute for about seven years, and as an avid participant in cricket, football and other sports, he was an advocate for community athletics and served as a Trustee of Shannon Park (Harbour Grace, NL).

During WWI, Oke was President of the local branch of the Newfoundland Patriotic Association (also called the Men's Patriotic Association). He was elected president of the Sons of England Benefit (or Benevolent) Society (Lodge Diamond Jubilee no. 236), which provided insurance benefits to members in need because of illness or other circumstances.

Serving as Master of Lodge Harbor Grace, A.F. and A.M., Oke was the 3rd generation of Oke family in Newfoundland to participate in Freemasonry, a tradition passed down from family in England. His son Ned was a member of the Masonic fraternity for 45 years, where he followed in his father's footsteps, also serving as Master of Lodge Harbour Grace No. 476 A.F. & A.M. S.C., which met in the oldest wooden Masonic building in Canada (constructed circa 1867). Ned was also an officer of the District Grand Lodge and an honorary office bearer of the Grand Lodge of Scotland.

Oke was the Superintendent of the Church of England Sunday school in the west end of Harbour Grace and was a Select Vestryman and Lay Delegate of the Diocesan Synod for St. Paul's Anglican Church.

== Family ==
On July 31, 1890, Oke married Sophia Lilla Snow (1862–1938), who from the age of 17 was a school teacher in Harbour Grace. Sophia became the President of the Harbor Grace Branch of the Women's Patriotic Association of Newfoundland during World War I, was named an Officer in the Civil Division of the Most Excellent Order of the British Empire and was secretary of St. Paul's branch of the Church of England Association (Harbour Grace, NL).

They raised two children. Oke's daughter Annie Gladys Oke (1891–1974) married the Rev. Gordon Stewart Templeton (1885–1969), the rector of St. Paul's Anglican Church (Harbour Grace, NL). In 1934, Templeton became Anglican Rector of the Parish of the Bay of Islands. Oke's son, Edward Langdon Oke, "Ned", (1893–1966) married Jessica Beatrice Sheppard (1901–1995). He was a sergeant with the Royal Newfoundland Regiment in WW1 and was active in The Great War Veterans Association, organized the Harbor Grace branch of The Canadian Legion of the British Empire Services League, now the Royal Canadian Legion. Ned lent pilot Capt. J. Erroll Boyd (1891–1960) his Webley & Scott flare pistol to carry during the first flight by a Canadian from North America to England, October 9–10, 1930, in the Wright-Bellanca WB-2 Maple Leaf (aka, Columbia), navigated by the American, Lieut. Harry Connor. This flight was also notable for transporting mail bearing a surcharged stamp as a commemorative overprint. The aviators had Ned's gun engraved to mark the historic flight and it resides in the collection at the Conception Bay Museum. Ned served as rector's warden of St. Paul's Church for more than a decade and was devoted to advancing community interests, dying in the home of Premier Joey Smallwood (1900–1991) during such a meeting.

In 1890, Oke's older brother, John Langdon Oke (1854–1928), wed Mary Winifred Sheppard, whose father, Nathaniel Sheppard, was, like Oke's father, uncle and grandfather, a lighthouse keeper on Harbour Grace Island. John was a Harbour Grace Water Company Secretary and Collector who suggested the site for the airport from which aviators such as Amelia Earhart would embark from Harbour Grace, NL to cross the Atlantic Ocean. The first pilots to use the airstrip, Edward F. Schlee (1887–1969) and William S. Brock (1895–1932), took off 26 August 1927 in the SM-1 NC857 monoplane, Pride of Detroit, attempting to set a speed record for round-the-world flight. In 1951, the early transatlantic flights from the Harbour Grace airfield were designated Events of National Historic Significance (Canada).

In 1989, Oke's father, Edward Langdon Oke, II was inducted into the Harbour Grace Sports Hall of Fame as founder of the Harbour Grace Regatta, the second oldest continuous sporting event in North America.
