= George John Bond =

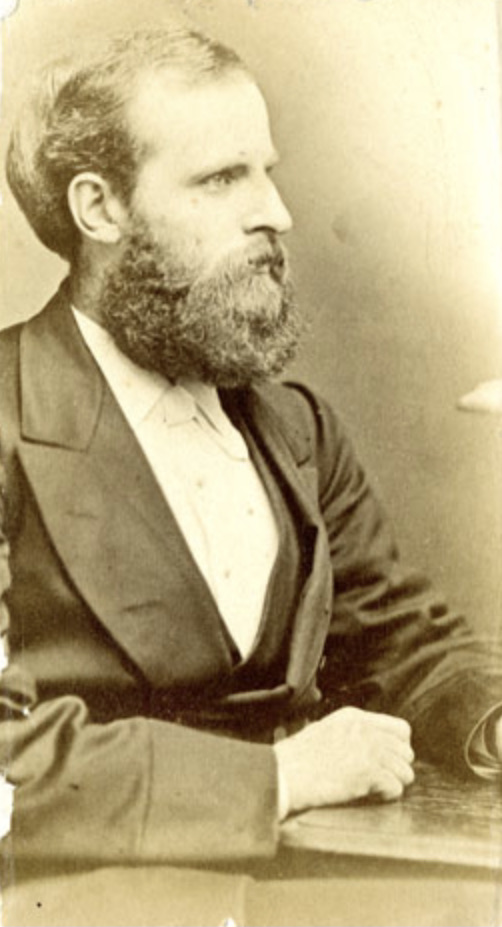
- G. J. Bond circa 1879
- Born: July 1, 1850; St. John's, Newfoundland, Canada
- Died: June 22, 1933 (aged 82); Halifax, Nova Scotia, Canada
- Education: General Protestant Academy; Mount Allison Methodist College
- Occupations: Minister, missionary
- Spouse: Lucy Amelia Macpherson
- Parents: John Bond (father); Elizabeth Parsons (mother)
- Relatives: Robert Bond (brother)

George John Bond (July 1, 1850 – June 22, 1933) was a Newfoundland Methodist minister, and missionary to China and Japan.

== Biography ==
=== Early life ===
Born in St. John's, Newfoundland, Bond was the eldest son of Elizabeth Parsons and John Bond. The elder Bond, a native of Kingskerswell, Devon, was born in 1804 and migrated to St. John's in the 1820s. George was brother to Sir Robert Bond, Newfoundland's premier from 1900 to 1909.

=== Career ===
Educated at the General Protestant Academy, Bond was accepted as a candidate for the Methodist ministry in 1871. From there he entered into studies at Mount Allison Methodist College in Sackville, New Brunswick. His first assignment after graduation was to Gower Street Methodist Church in St. John's as an assistant minister. Bond was ordained into the Methodist ministry at George Street Methodist Church on June 26, 1876.

Bond spent the next 14 years in service at many of the outlying communities of Newfoundland before taking up his last posting at Grand Bank in 1890. During his first 20 years in the ministry, Bond was actively involved in the governance of the Methodist Church in Newfoundland, serving on numerous boards and committees at various levels. In both 1885 and 1889, he filled the post of President of Conference.

Due to illness and death of family members in a time when many fell victim to the typhoid epidemic that brought hundreds of young lives to an early end, Bond spent a little more than a year in Grand Bank before deciding to transfer to the Nova Scotia Conference of the Methodist Church. In 1895, Bond accepted the editorship of The Wesleyan, the official organ of the Nova Scotia Conference, based in Halifax. He held that position until 1902 when he relocated to Toronto to become editor of The Christian Guardian, which had been founded by Methodists there as their weekly newspaper in 1829.

After the death of his beloved wife Lucy Amelia (Macpherson), Bond was moved to take up missionary work in Japan and China. He travelled up the Yangtze River as far as Sichuan, where he visited with fellow missionaries and acquired an ample supply of photographs and information from which he developed an illustrated lecture series. His Oriental excursion complete, he returned to Nova Scotia, where he served in a number of churches of the next seven years, and in 1911 was elected President of the Nova Scotia Conference.

Bond was invited back to St. John's in 1916 by the congregation of Cochrane Street Methodist Church. He served there for five years; during this time, he served a third term as President of the Newfoundland Conference in 1919. Before Bond left Cochrane Street in 1921, he attended the worldwide Ecumenical Conference in London, England, as a representative from Newfoundland.

In addition to his clerical work, Bond was an accomplished writer of fiction. In 1887, he published a novel, Skipper George Netman, the story of Newfoundland fishermen and their lives in the fictional outport of Caplin Bight. He wrote a short story, The Castaway of Fish Rock plus other stories of non-fiction essays on the Church's missionary work. He died on June 22, 1933, at Halifax, Nova Scotia, his body was brought back to St. John's for burial from Cochrane Street Methodist Church.

Bond's oldest son, Herbert, was chosen as Newfoundland's second Rhodes Scholar in 1905. He drowned on a surveying expedition in British Columbia in 1910.

== Published works ==
- Bond, George J. (1887). Skipper George Netman: A Story of Out-port Methodism in Newfoundland. London: T. Woolmer. ISBN 978-0-665-67813-4.
- Bond, Geo. J. (1911). Our Share in China and What We Are Doing with It. Toronto: Missionary Society of the Methodist Church.

== See also ==
- Methodism in Sichuan
