= Joseph Greene (Newfoundland politician) =

Canadian politician

Joseph M. Greene (1890 – December 17, 1969) was an accountant and political figure in Newfoundland. He represented Bell Island in the Newfoundland and Labrador House of Assembly from 1928 to 1932 as a Liberal.

He was born in St. John's, and educated at Saint Bonaventure's College. He worked on Bell Island for the Dominion Iron and Steel Company. Greene served as a Commissioner of Agriculture. He was defeated when he ran for reelection in 1932. During his time in college, Greene set a Newfoundland record in the half mile; he later coached track and field at Saint Bonaventure's College. After leaving politics, he was employed in auditing the accounts for various firms in Newfoundland. He died in St. John's in 1969.

His uncle Daniel Joseph Greene served briefly as Newfoundland premier. His son James also served in the Newfoundland assembly.
