= Moses M. Young =

Newfoundland mariner and politician

Moses Mackenzie Young (1878–1947) was a mariner, merchant and politician in Newfoundland. He represented Harbour Grace in the Newfoundland House of Assembly from 1913 to 1919.

The son of James Young, he was born in Upper Island Cove and was educated in Spaniard's Bay. Young became a master mariner and skipper. In 1900, he began operating a business supplying fishermen on the Labrador coast. He was named a justice of the peace in 1920. From 1929 to 1934, he was an inspector for outport roads, bridges and other public works. He was a freemason and a member of the Orange Order. Young married Mary Ann Squires.
