= Georgina Stirling =

Opera singer from the Dominion of Newfoundland

Georgina Ann Stirling (April 3, 1867 – April 21, 1935) was a Newfoundland opera singer, known by her stage name Marie Toulinquet. Born in Twillingate, in Newfoundland, she became a world-renowned prima donna soprano who played in opera houses throughout Europe and United States. She was Newfoundland's first opera singer and became known as The Nightingale of the North.

== Life and career ==
Stirling was the daughter of Ann (Peyton) and William Stirling. She was educated at Twillingate and Toronto and went on to study singing in Paris, Italy and Germany. She had taken the stage name "Toulinguet" which was the original French name for Twillingate. At the age of fifteen she played as a church organist in her hometown and early in her career had been instrumental in the formation of the Dorcas Society.

While in Paris, Stirling had studied under the tutorship of Madame Mathilde Marchesi where she was discovered by a Milan opera company. She toured and accepted engagements with many operas such as the Opera Company of New York City, the Boston Harmony Orchestral Society and the Scalchi Opera Company. At the peak of her career she had developed a throat ailment that cut her singing career short. She eventually made a comeback as concert artist.

Stirling had returned to her hometown of Twillingate to live with her sister Rose where she eventually died on April 21, 1935, Easter Sunday. Her grave is located at Snelling Cove and happens to overlook the ocean.

== See also ==
- List of Canadian musicians
- Music of Newfoundland and Labrador
- List of Newfoundland songs
