= Henry Earle (politician) =

Newfoundland politician (1841–1934)

Henry Earle MHA

Member of the Newfoundland House of Assembly for Fogo
- In office November 8, 1900 – October 30, 1913
- Preceded by: Thomas C. Duder
- Succeeded by: William Halfyard

Personal details
- Born: Henry John Earle; October 29, 1841 St. John's, Newfoundland Colony
- Died: December 26, 1934 (aged 93) St. John's, Newfoundland
- Party: Liberal
- Spouse: Amelia A. Rolls (m. 1873)
- Children: 8
- Relatives: James Rolls (brother-in-law); H. R. V. Earle (grandson)
- Education: Bishop Feild College
- Occupation: Merchant

Henry John Earle (October 29, 1841 – December 26, 1934) was a Newfoundland merchant and politician. As a Liberal supporter of premier Robert Bond, he served as the member of the Newfoundland House of Assembly (MHA) for Fogo from 1900 to 1913.

== Business career ==
Earle was born in St. John's to Henry and Catherine Earle. He attended the local Church of England academy and Bishop Feild College before moving to Fogo in 1862 as a clerk for Slade & Company, which had once been the most prominent mercantile firm in Notre Dame Bay. When the business shuttered in 1869, Earle purchased Slade & Company's premises and established the export firm Owen & Earle alongside John W. Owen, who had also worked for the Slades. Earle married Amelia Rolls on December 18, 1873. Owen later separated from Earle in 1893 to carry on business in Twillingate, and the firm was renamed Earle & Company under Earle's sole ownership. When Owens retired to England in 1897, Earle moved into Bleak House, his former partner's home in Fogo.

By 1900, Earle's business had branches in Change Islands and Herring Neck. He was deeply involved in Fogo community life as the lay reader and organist for St. Andrew's Anglican Church.

== Politics and legacy ==
Earle successfully ran as the Liberal candidate for the district of Fogo in the 1900 election. His support for the popular prime minister Robert Bond ensured that he was elected by large margins in the subsequent 1904 and 1908 elections, but he only narrowly held onto his seat when Edward Morris took power in 1909. Earle retired in 1913 and spent the remainder of his life in Fogo, becoming a Justice of the Peace as well as a vice-consul to Portugal under prime minister Richard Squires.

Earle died in St. John's on December 26, 1934. Although his family took over Earle Sons and Company Ltd., the firm closed in 1967 following the collapse of the Labrador summer cod fishery.
