= Flat Islands, Bonavista Bay, Newfoundland and Labrador =

Flat Islands
- Abandoned settlement
- Interactive map of Flat Islands
- Coordinates: 48°48′0″N 53°37′57″W
- Country: Canada
- Province: Newfoundland and Labrador
- Region: Bonavista Bay
- Settled: Early 19th century
- Resettled: 1957
- Time zone: UTC−3:30 (NST)
  - Summer (DST): UTC−2:30 (NDT)

Flat Islands is a vacated settlement in the Canadian province of Newfoundland and Labrador, located on Bonavista Bay.
