= Augustus F. Goodridge =

8th Premier of Newfoundland (1894)

The Honourable Augustus F. Goodridge MLC MHA
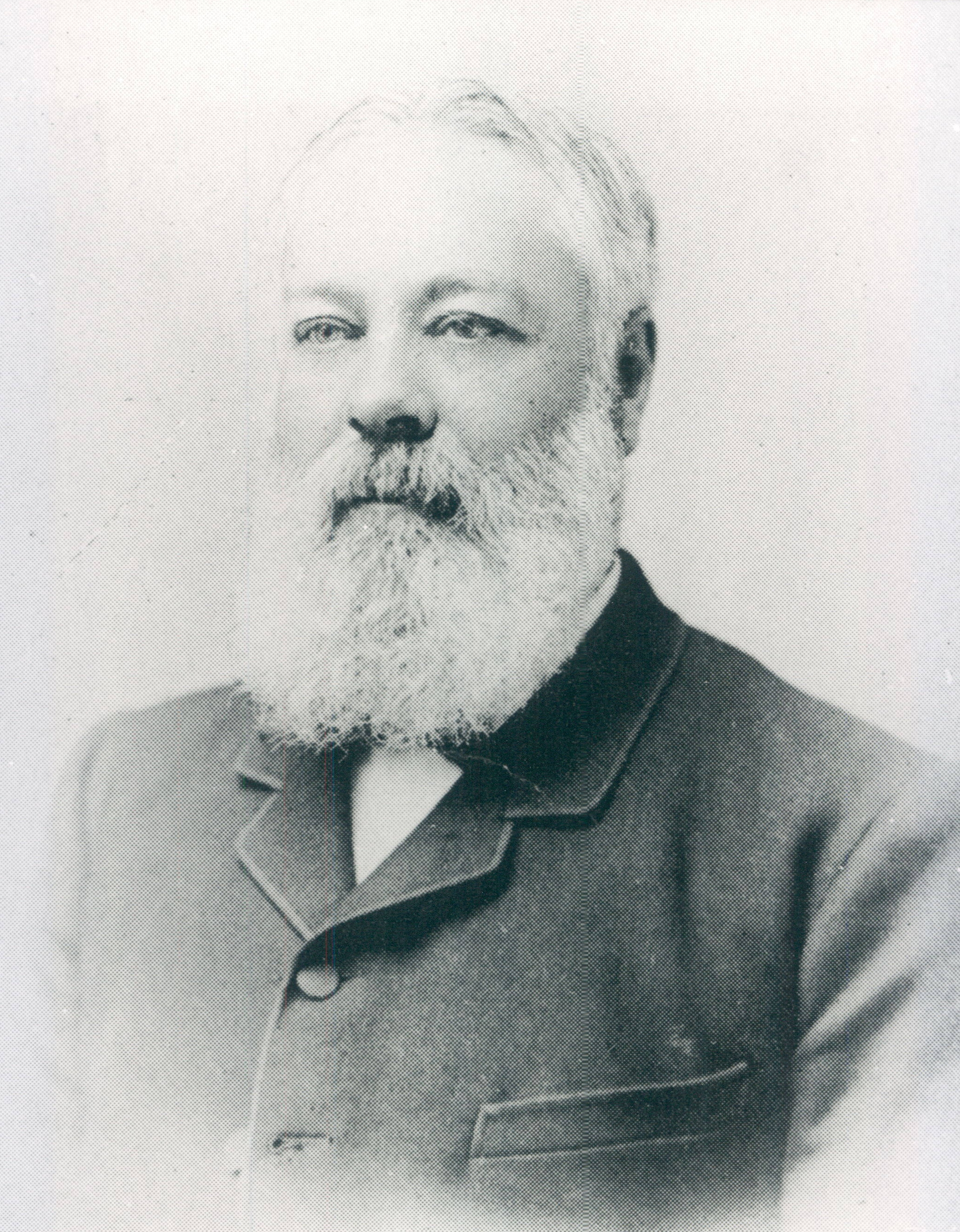
- Goodridge in 1894

8th Premier of Newfoundland
- In office April 11, 1894 – December 12, 1894
- Monarch: Victoria
- Governor: Terence O'Brien
- Preceded by: William Whiteway
- Succeeded by: Daniel Greene
Legislative offices
Member of the Legislative Council of Newfoundland
In office 1913 – February 16, 1920
Appointed by	Edward Morris
Member of the Newfoundland House of Assembly for Twillingate
In office November 6, 1893 – October 28, 1897 Serving with Michael T. Knight (1893– 1897); Jabez P. Thompson (1893–1895); Robert Bond (1895–1897)
Preceded by	Edward P. Burgess; Thomas Peyton
Succeeded by	Donald Browning; Alan Goodridge
In office October 31, 1885 – November 6, 1889 Serving with Michael T. Knight and Smith McKay
Preceded by	Richard P. Rice; Jabez P. Thompson (as MHAs for Twillingate and Fogo)
Succeeded by	Edward P. Burgess; Thomas Peyton; Jabez P. Thompson
Member of the Newfoundland House of Assembly for Ferryland
In office November 2, 1880 – October 31, 1885 Serving with Daniel Greene
Preceded by	James G. Conroy
Succeeded by	George Shea

Personal details
- Born: Augustus Frederick Goodridge; 1839 Paignton, Devon, England
- Died: February 16, 1920 (aged 80–81) St. John's, Newfoundland
- Party: Liberal (1880–1885); Reform (1885–1889); Conservative (1889–1897)
- Relatives: Alan Goodridge (nephew)

Augustus Frederick Goodridge (c. 1839 – February 16, 1920) was a Newfoundland merchant and politician who briefly served as the Premier of Newfoundland in 1894.

== Early life and business career ==
Goodridge was born in Paignton, Devon, England as the son of Alan Goodridge, a merchant who operated a Newfoundland mercantile firm called Alan Goodridge and Sons. He emigrated to Renews, Newfoundland in 1853 to work as a clerk at his father's business, and remained in Renews after the firm moved its headquarters to the capital city of St. John's. After being promoted to partner by his father in 1862, Goodridge joined the family in St. John's. He managed the business with his brothers Henry and John Goodridge following their father's death in 1884 until the firm was liquidated in 1917.

== Politics ==
Goodridge became a fish merchant and ship owner in St. John's. He joined the Conservative Party, and was first elected to the House of Assembly in 1880. He became leader of the Conservatives in 1884. From 1885 to 1889 he served in the conservative Protestant Reform Party government of Sir Robert Thorburn. The Reform Party collapsed and Thorburn went into opposition as leader of the new Tory Party.

Goodridge's Tories lost the 1893 election to the Liberals led by Sir William Whiteway. However, the Tories complained that Whiteway's Liberals had promised jobs to Newfoundlanders who voted for him and filed petitions in the Supreme Court under the Corrupt Practices Act against fifteen Liberal members of the House alleging bribery and corruption. The members were tried and found guilty and their seats were declared vacant.

In April 1894, in the midsts of the trials, Whiteway attempted to dissolve the House of Assembly and call new elections. Instead, Governor Sir Terence O'Brien refused Whiteway's requested and instead appointed Goodridge as the new Premier despite the fact that Goodridge's Tories were outnumbered by Liberals in the House of Assembly. In order to prevent the Tories from being defeated by a Motion of No Confidence, Murray repeatedly prorogued the House before a vote could be held. Regardless of this assistance by the governor, Goodridge's Tory Party government was short lived due to a mounting political and economic crisis and resigned on December 12, 1894, after the collapse of two banks.

Goodridge lost his seat in the 1904 election. A few years later he was appointed to the Legislative Council (Newfoundland's upper house) by Prime Minister Edward Patrick Morris, where he served until his death on February 16, 1920.

Political offices
Preceded by Sir William Whiteway	Premier of Newfoundland; 1894	Succeeded by Daniel J. Greene
