= Exploits, Newfoundland and Labrador =

Settlement in Newfoundland and Labrador, Canada

Coordinates: 49°31′00″N 55°04′00″W

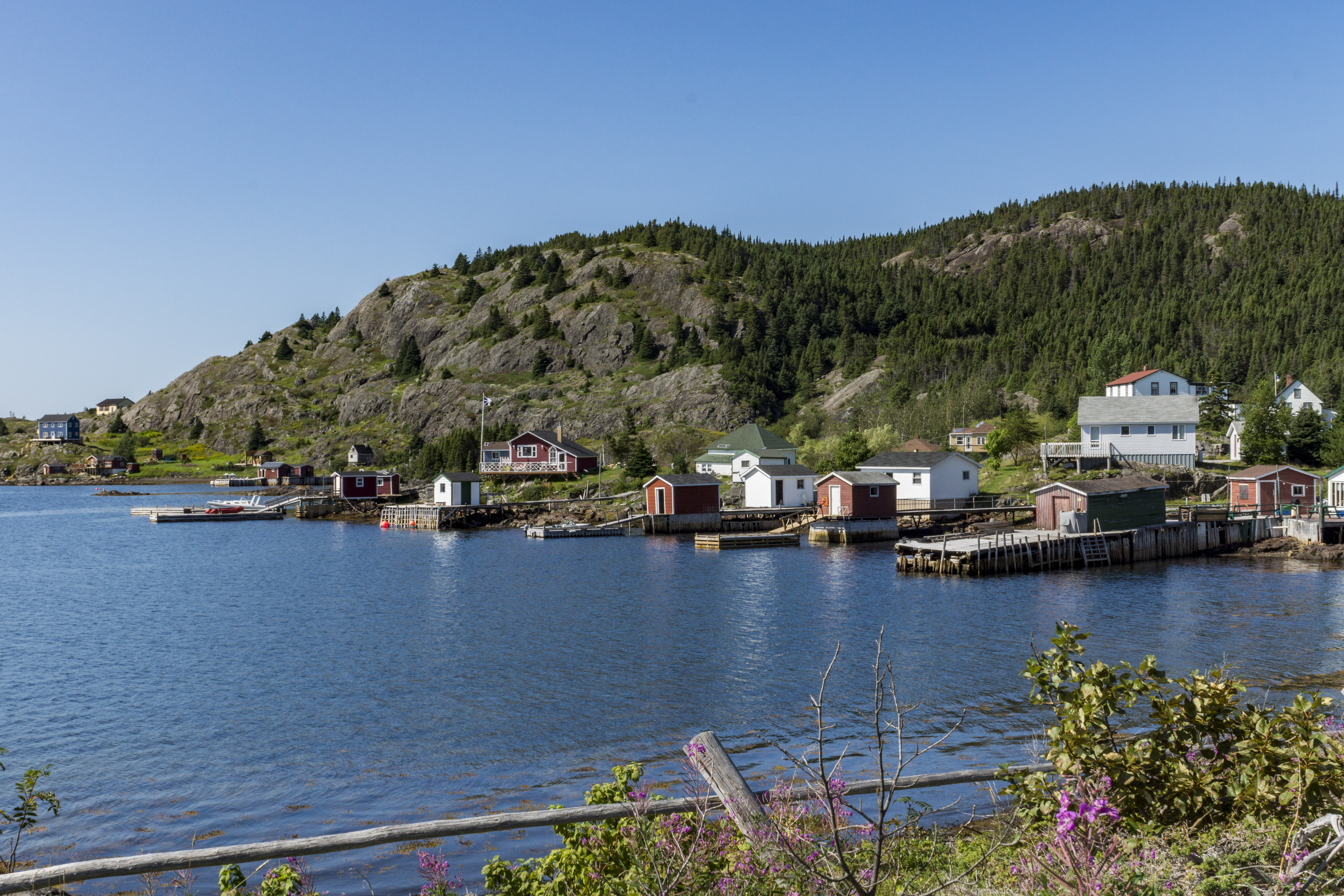
A harbour in the community of Exploits, located on an island in Notre Dame Bay, Newfoundland.

Exploits was a community located on Burnt Island, Newfoundland, Canada. Its strategic location made it an ideal hub for sealing, fishing, and trading with Labrador. But by the late 1960s, the community had been largely resettled. Today, the community only consists of seasonal residents.

== See also ==
- List of communities in Newfoundland and Labrador
