= Jabez P. Thompson =

Canadian politician

- Born: October 9, 1852; Harbour Grace, Newfoundland
- Died: January 18, 1938 (aged 85); Brigus, Newfoundland
- Occupations: newspaper publisher, magistrate and politician

Jabez Pike Thompson (October 9, 1852 – January 18, 1938), was a newspaper publisher, magistrate and politician in Newfoundland. He represented Twillingate and Fogo from 1882 to 1885 and Twillingate from 1889 to 1895 in the Newfoundland House of Assembly.

The son of Henry Thompson, M.D., and Elizabeth Curtis, he was born in Harbour Grace and was educated there. Thompson married Sarah Ann Salter,, of St. John's on August 2, 1883.

He worked as a printer for the Harbour Grace Standard. In 1880, he moved to Twillingate, where he founded the Twillingate Sun. In 1898, he founded the Vindicator and Brigus Reporter.

Thompson was first elected to the assembly in 1882 as a supporter of William Whiteway. He ran unsuccessfully for reelection in 1885 as an independent supporting Whiteway, but was elected as a Liberal in 1889. He was reelected in 1893 and was named Surveyor-General, serving in the cabinet of Daniel Joseph Greene. He resigned his seat in 1895 to allow Robert Bond to run for a seat in the assembly. He was appointed a stipendiary magistrate for Brigus that same year and moved to Conception Bay. In 1900, he ran unsuccessfully for the Port-de-Grave seat in the assembly as a Liberal. Thompson retired from his position as magistrate in 1934. He died in Brigus four years later.

His eldest daughter, Clara Thompson, married Lewis Goodison Bartlett, a brother of Arctic explorer, Captain Bob Bartlett. Their son was Rupert Bartlett, QC, Justice of the Supreme Court of Newfoundland and the Northwest Territories.

Thompson's son, Harold William Thompson, founded Thompson Publications in Toronto, Ontario. Thompson's sister, Maria Raven Thompson, was married to Alexander A. Parsons. By virtue of his father, Thompson was a cousin of John Gordon Thompson, founder of Supertest Petroleum, and his son, Jim Thompson (powerboat racing). By virtue of his mother, Thompson was a cousin of Leslie Curtis, QC, and John Stuart Foster, Jr.

His former residence at Brigus has been designated a heritage structure by the Heritage Foundation of Newfoundland and Labrador.
