= Eli Dawe =

Newfoundland politician (1843–1930)

The Honourable Captain Eli Dawe MHA MLC
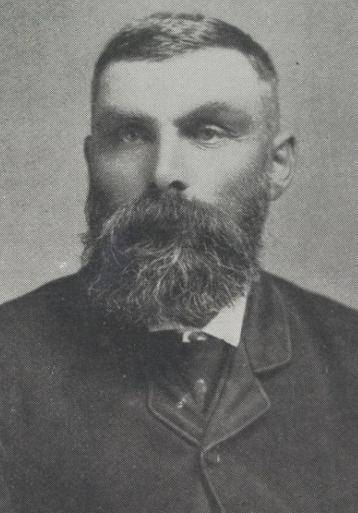
- Dawe in 1894

Minister of Agriculture and Mines
- In office 1900–1904
- Premier: Robert Bond
- Preceded by: Thomas C. Duder
- Succeeded by: James A. Clift

Member of the Legislative Council of Newfoundland
- In office 1922 – June 25, 1930
- Appointed by: Richard Squires

Member of the Newfoundland House of Assembly for Harbour Grace
- In office November 6, 1889 – May 8, 1909 Serving with Robert S. Munn (1889–1894); William H. Whiteley (1889–1893); Henry Dawe (1893–1897); William Whiteway (1894–1897); William Horwood (1897–1900); William Oke (1897–1908); Augustus W. Harvey (1900–1903); Arthur Barnes (1904–1908); Edward Parsons (1908–1909); Archibald Piccott (1908–1909)
- Preceded by: Charles Dawe; Joseph Godden; James S. Winter
- Succeeded by: Alfred H. Seymour

Personal details
- Born: November 15, 1843 Port de Grave, Newfoundland Colony
- Died: June 25, 1930 (aged 86) Coley's Point, Newfoundland
- Party: Liberal
- Spouse: Susannah Bradbury (m. 1873)
- Occupation: Fisherman

Eli Dawe (November 15, 1843 – June 25, 1930) was a merchant and politician in Newfoundland. He represented Harbour Grace in the Newfoundland House of Assembly from 1889 to 1909 as a Liberal.

== Early life ==
Dawe was born in Port de Grave as the son of Eli Dawe and Emma (née Batten). He was educated at the local Anglican schools in Bay Roberts and Coley's Point. Dawe worked as a fisherman, later becoming director of a coal company at Coley's Point. He married Susannah Bradbury in 1873.

== Politics ==
In 1893, Dawe was elected to the Newfoundland House of Assembly in the district of Harbour Grace as a supporter of Premier William Whiteway. He served in the Executive Council as financial secretary, chairman of the Board of Works and Minister of Agriculture and Mines. Dawe was named to the Legislative Council of Newfoundland in 1922. He died in Coley's Point on June 25, 1930.
