= Daniel Joseph Greene =

9th Premier of Newfoundland (1894–1895)

The Honourable Daniel Joseph Greene MLC MHA
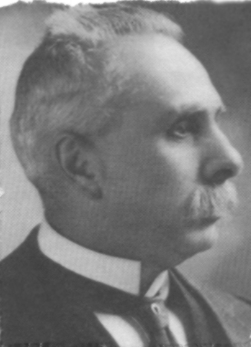

9th Premier of Newfoundland
- In office December 13, 1894 – February 8, 1895
- Monarch: Victoria
- Governor: Terence O'Brien
- Preceded by: Augustus F. Goodridge
- Succeeded by: Sir William Whiteway

Member of the Legislative Council of Newfoundland
- In office 1897 – December 12, 1911
- Appointed by: James S. Winter

Member of the Newfoundland House of Assembly for Ferryland
- In office November 9, 1878 – October 28, 1897 Serving with James G. Conroy (1878–1880); Augustus F. Goodridge (1880–1885); George Shea (1885–1893); Michael Cashin (1893–1897)
- Preceded by: Richard Raftus
- Succeeded by: George Shea

Personal details
- Born: Daniel Joseph Greene; 1850 St. John's, Newfoundland Colony
- Died: December 12, 1911 (aged 60–61) St. John's, Newfoundland
- Party: Liberal
- Spouse: Anastasia Greene
- Relatives: Joseph Greene (nephew); James Greene (great-nephew)
- Education: Laval University

Daniel Joseph Greene (c. 1850 – December 12, 1911) was a Newfoundland politician who briefly served as the Premier of Newfoundland from 1894 to 1895.

== Early life and education ==
Greene was born in 1850 in St. John's. He studied law at Laval University and was called to the Newfoundland bar in 1874, entering into a partnership with Robert Pinsent.

== Political career ==
Daniel Greene was first elected to the House of Assembly in 1875 and became Leader of the Opposition in 1887. In 1889 he became a minister in the government of Liberal Premier Sir William Whiteway. A year after the 1893 elections, Whiteway's government was dismissed by the governor Arthur Murray due to petitions alleging corrupt electoral practices. Murray appointed Tory leader Augustus F. Goodridge as the new premier and helped the minority government stay in office. Goodridge resigned in December 1894 after the collapse of two banks.

Greene had become acting Liberal leader due to the disbarment of Whiteway from holding electoral office. On December 13, 1894, following the collapse of Goodridge's government, Greene was sworn in as premier.

Green's government promptly passed the Disabilities Removal Act allowing candidates who had been disqualified because of election irregularities in 1893 to seek election again. Specifically, it allowed Whiteway to return as Premier which occurred on February 8, 1895 when Greene resigned.

== Post-premiership and legacy ==
Greene chose to stand down in the 1897 election, but Premier James S. Winter appointed him to the Legislative Council of Newfoundland later that year. He continued his law practice while serving in the upper house. Greene died on December 12, 1911 in St. John's, and he was given a state funeral.

His nephew Joseph M. Greene also served in the Newfoundland House of Assembly from 1928 to 1932. Joseph Green's son, James Greene, was leader of the Opposition Conservative Party from 1960 to 1966.

Political offices
Preceded by Augustus F. Goodridge	Premier of Newfoundland; 1894–1895	Succeeded by Sir William Whiteway
