= Donald Browning =

Newfoundland politician (1860–1914)

Donald Browning KC

Member of the Newfoundland House of Assembly for Twillingate
- In office October 28, 1897 – 1899 Serving with Robert Bond and Alan Goodridge
- Preceded by: Giles Foote; Augustus F. Goodridge
- Succeeded by: James A. Clift; George Roberts

Personal details
- Born: 1860 St. John's, Newfoundland Colony
- Died: April 24, 1914 (aged 53–54) St. John's, Newfoundland
- Party: Liberal
- Education: Upper Canada College; University of Glasgow
- Occupation: Lawyer

Donald MacRae Browning KC (1860 – April 24, 1914) was a lawyer and politician in Newfoundland Colony. He represented Twillingate in the Newfoundland House of Assembly from 1897 to 1899 as a Liberal.

The son of Gilbert Browning, he was born in St. John's. He attended classes at Upper Canada College and at the University of Glasgow. Browning was called to the Newfoundland bar in 1888. He ran unsuccessfully for the Harbour Grace seat in the Newfoundland assembly in 1893. From 1894 to 1897, Browning served as solicitor for the assembly. He resigned his seat in the assembly in 1899 to become registrar for the Supreme Court of Newfoundland and Registrar of Deeds. He was also named King's Counsel in 1899. With Sir Edward Morris, he was co-editor of the Law Reports from 1899 to 1903.

Browning died on April 24, 1914 in St. John's.
