= William Horwood (judge) =

Newfoundland politician (1862–1945)

The Honourable Sir William H. Horwood KCMG
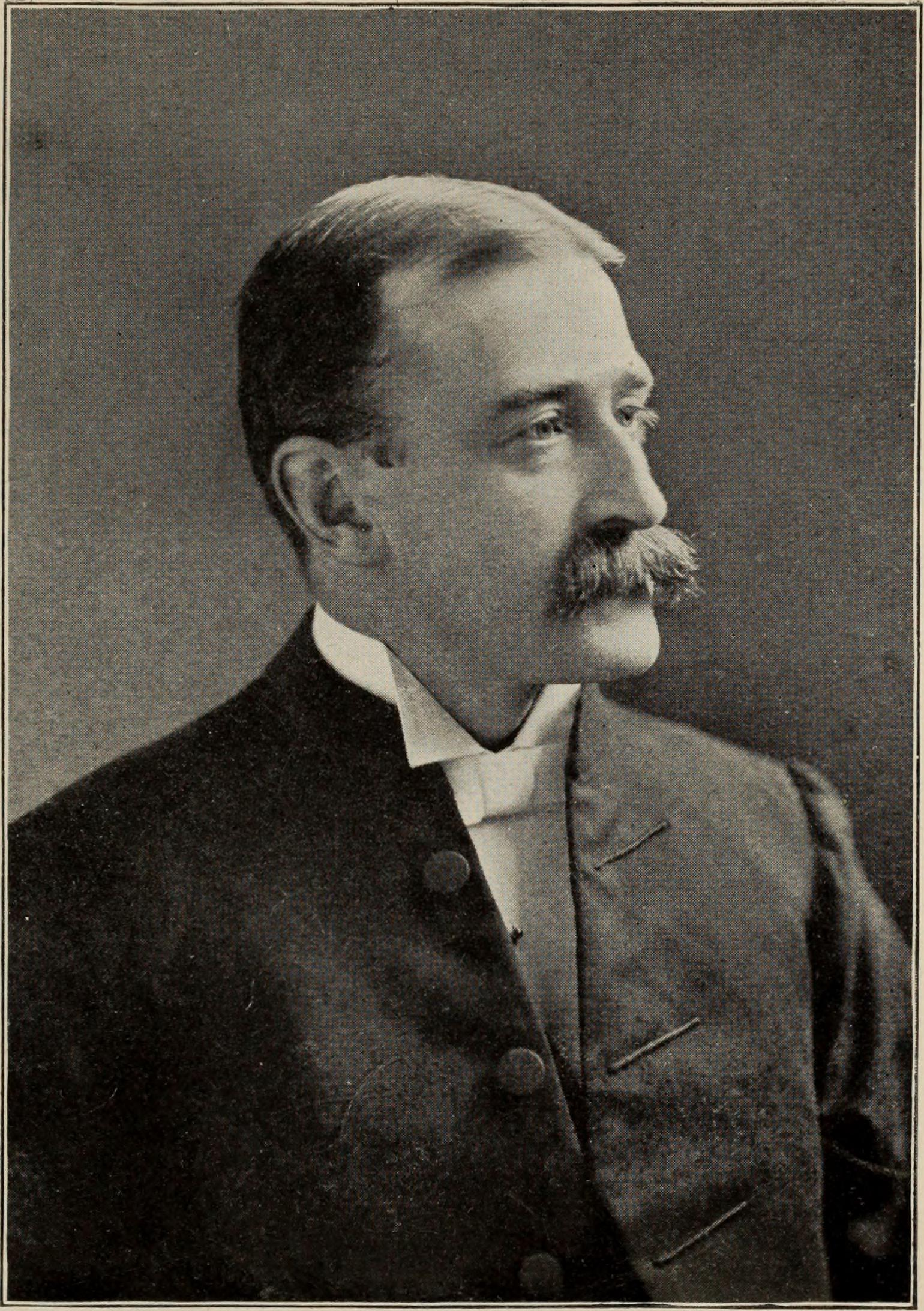
- Horwood in 1902

16th Chief Justice of Newfoundland
- In office July 25, 1902 – 1944
- Preceded by: Joseph Little
- Succeeded by: Edward Emerson

Minister of Justice and Attorney General
- In office 1900 – July 25, 1902
- Premier: Robert Bond
- Preceded by: James S. Winter
- Succeeded by: Edward Morris

Colonial Secretary
- In office December 1894 – February 8, 1895
- Premier: Daniel J. Greene
- Preceded by: Alfred B. Morine
- Succeeded by: Robert Bond
Legislative offices
Member of the Newfoundland House of Assembly for Trinity Bay
In office November 8, 1900 – July 25, 1902 Serving with George W. Gushue and George M. Johnson
Preceded by	Robert S. Bremner; John A. Robinson; Robert Watson
Succeeded by	William Warren; Robert Watson
In office October 16, 1894 – October 28, 1897 Serving with George W. Gushue and George M. Johnson
Preceded by	Robert Bond; James H. Watson; William Whiteway
Succeeded by	Robert S. Bremner; Levi March; Robert Watson
Member of the Newfoundland House of Assembly for Harbour Grace
In office October 28, 1897 – November 8, 1900 Serving with Eli Dawe and William Oke
Preceded by	William Whiteway
Succeeded by	Augustus W. Harvey

Personal details
- Born: William Henry Horwood; November 5, 1862 St. John's, Newfoundland Colony
- Died: April 7, 1945 (aged 82) St. John's, Newfoundland
- Party: Liberal
- Spouse: Julia Hutchinson (m. 1908)
- Occupation: Lawyer

Sir William Henry Horwood KCMG (November 5, 1862 – April 7, 1945) was a politician who served as Chief Justice of Newfoundland and Labrador from 1902 to 1944. He represented Trinity from 1894 to 1897 and from 1900 to 1902 and Harbour Grace from 1897 to 1900 in the Newfoundland House of Assembly.

Born in St. John's, Horwood was educated at Bishop Feild College and went on to study law. He was called to the Newfoundland bar in 1885. In 1895, he was named Queen's Counsel. He was first elected to the Newfoundland assembly in a by-election held in 1894. Horwood was a member of the Executive Council from 1894 to 1897 and from 1900 to 1902. He was Colonial Secretary from 1894 to 1895 and Minister of Justice and Attorney General from 1900 to 1902. In 1895, he was a Newfoundland delegate to a conference in Ottawa to discuss confederation with Canada. Horwood resigned from cabinet and the assembly upon being named Chief Justice in July 1902.

On December 19, 1904, Horwood was knighted as a Knight Bachelor.

He was appointed president of the Newfoundland branch of St. John Ambulance following its initiation in April 1910.

In 1908, Horwood married Julia Hutchinson. He was named a Knight Commander in the Order of St Michael and St George in 1944. He died in St. John's at the age of 82.
