= Michael T. Knight =

Newfoundland politician (1832–1916)

The Honourable Michael T. Knight MHA
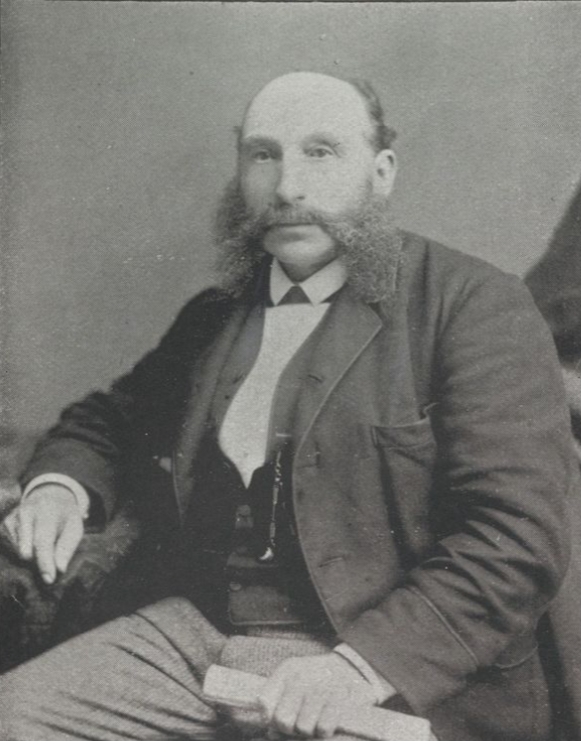
- Knight in 1894

Surveyor General
- In office 1894 – October 16, 1894
- Premier: Augustus F. Goodridge
- Preceded by: Henry J. B. Woods
- Succeeded by: James C. Tessier

Financial Secretary
- In office 1885–1889
- Premier: Robert Thorburn
- Preceded by: Francis Winton
- Succeeded by: John Studdy

Member of the Newfoundland House of Assembly for Bay de Verde
- In office November 8, 1900 – October 31, 1904 Serving with Henry J. B. Woods (1900–1902); Isaac Mercer (1902–1904)
- Preceded by: Abram Kean; William Rogerson
- Succeeded by: Charles H. Hutchings; William C. Winsor

Member of the Newfoundland House of Assembly for Twillingate
- In office November 6, 1893 – October 16, 1894 Serving with Augustus F. Goodridge and Jabez P. Thompson
- Preceded by: Edward P. Burgess; Thomas Peyton
- Succeeded by: Giles Foote
- In office October 31, 1885 – November 6, 1889 Serving with Augustus F. Goodridge and Smith McKay
- Preceded by: Richard P. Rice; Jabez P. Thompson
- Succeeded by: Edward P. Burgess; Thomas Peyton; Jabez P. Thompson

Personal details
- Born: January 29, 1832 St. John's, Newfoundland Colony
- Died: August 7, 1916 (aged 84) St. John's, Newfoundland
- Party: Reform (1885–1889); Liberal (1893–1904)
- Occupation: Customs collector

Michael Thomas Knight (January 29, 1832 – August 7, 1916) was an official and politician in Newfoundland. He represented Twillingate from 1885 to 1889 as a Liberal and from 1893 to 1894 as a Conservative and Bay de Verde from 1900 to 1904 as a Liberal in the Newfoundland House of Assembly.

He was born in St. John's and was educated at Castle Rennie there. Knight was first employed as a clerk with P. Rogerson and Co. From 1865 to 1876, he was a customs collector in Labrador, then served as secretary for the Board of Works. He was an unsuccessful candidate for a seat in the Newfoundland assembly in 1882. He was elected to the assembly in 1885 and served in the Executive Council as financial secretary. He was defeated when he ran for reelection in 1889 but was elected again in 1893. Knight was named to cabinet in 1894 but was defeated when he ran for reelection as was required at the time. He was elected again for Bay de Verde in 1900.
