= Henry Y. Mott =

Newfoundland politician (1855–1946)

The Honourable Henry Y. Mott MHA
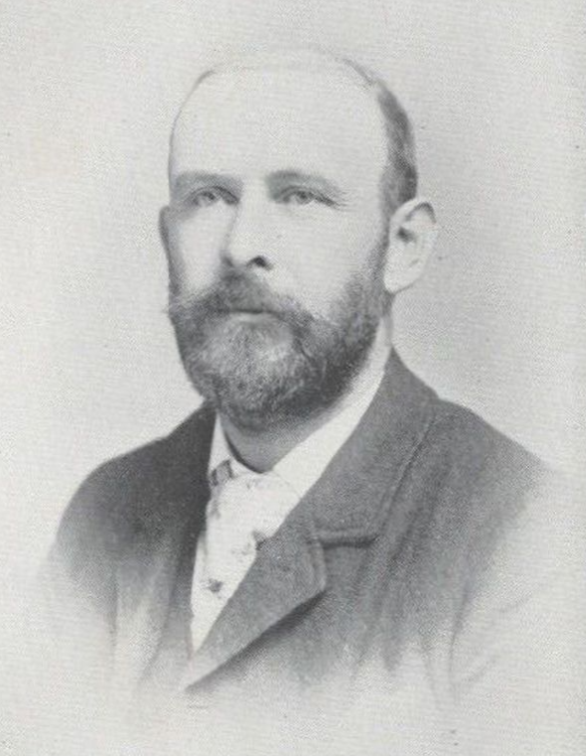
- Mott in 1894

17th Speaker of the Newfoundland House of Assembly
- In office 1897–1900
- Preceded by: Lawrence O. Furlong
- Succeeded by: Lawrence O. Furlong

Member of the Newfoundland House of Assembly for Burgeo and LaPoile
- In office September 10, 1894 – November 8, 1900
- Preceded by: James Murray
- Succeeded by: Charles Emerson

Personal details
- Born: Henry Youmans Mott; October 9, 1855 Dartmouth, Nova Scotia
- Died: October 7, 1946 (aged 90) St. John's, Newfoundland
- Party: Conservative
- Spouse: Alice M. Bowden
- Occupation: Pharmacist, periodical editor

Henry Youmans Mott (October 9, 1855 – October 7, 1946) was a journalist, author and political figure in Newfoundland. He represented Burgeo and LaPoile in the Newfoundland and Labrador House of Assembly from 1894 to 1900.

== Early life and career ==
Mott was born on October 9, 1855 in Dartmouth, Nova Scotia, the son of Henry Mott and Rebecca Walker. He originally apprenticed in the pharmaceutical business but then trained as a piano tuner and came to St. John's in 1877. Mott served as editor of the Temperance Journal for a time. In 1890, Mott married Alice M. Bowden. He was the author of Newfoundland men: a collection of biographical sketches, with portraits, of sons and residents of the island who have become known in commercial, professional, and political life (1894).

== Politics and later career ==
Mott was elected to the Newfoundland House of Assembly in an 1894 by-election. He was re-elected in the 1897 and was nominated as speaker from 1897 to 1900. He was editor of the Daily News from 1898 to 1906. Mott served as chief clerk for the House of Assembly from 1912 to 1934. He died in St. John's at the age of 90.
