= John E. Lake =

Canadian politician

John E. Lake (May 2, 1845 – December 29, 1920) was an entrepreneur and politician in Newfoundland. He represented Burin in the Newfoundland House of Assembly from 1897 to 1900 as a Conservative.

The son of George Lake and Elizabeth Poole, he was born in Fortune. As an outfitter for schooners, Lake played an important role in the development of the Grand Banks fishery. He also operated a salmon and lobster cannery, a boot and shoe factory and a furniture-making business. In 1894, he established a large sawmill at Milltown, later adding two more sawmills at Conne River and Little River. Lake went bankrupt in 1917 but his two sons took over the sawmills.
