= James A. Clift =

Newfoundland politician (1857–1923)

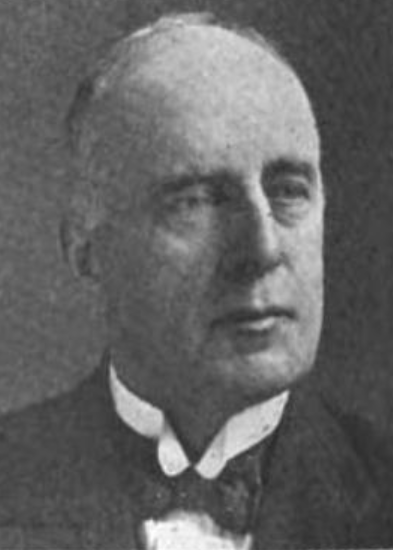

Member of the Newfoundland House of Assembly for Twillingate
- In office November 8, 1900 – November 3, 1919 Serving with Robert Bond (1900–14); George Roberts (1900–13); Walter Jennings (1913–19); William Coaker (1914–19)
- Preceded by: Donald Browning; Alan Goodridge
- Succeeded by: George Jones; Solomon Samson

Member of the Newfoundland House of Assembly for Port de Grave
- In office November 6, 1889 – November 6, 1893
- Preceded by: George A. Hutchings
- Succeeded by: Charles Dawe

Personal details
- Born: James Augustus Clift; December 22, 1857; St. John's, Newfoundland
- Died: February 8, 1923 (aged 65); St. John's, Newfoundland
- Political party: Liberal
- Spouse: Agnes Paterson (m. 1891)
- Occupation: Lawyer

James Augustus Clift, CBE, KC (December 22, 1857 – February 8, 1923) was a lawyer, insurance agent and political figure in Newfoundland. He represented Port de Grave from 1889 to 1893 and Twillingate from 1900 to 1919 in the Newfoundland and Labrador House of Assembly as a Liberal.

== Biography ==
He was born in St. John's, the son of Theodore Clift, and was educated there and at the Windsor Academy in Nova Scotia. Clift studied law with Prescott Emerson and A. O. Hayward and was called to the Newfoundland bar in 1883. He was an agent for the Equitable Life Assurance Company and the General Fire Assurance Company of London. Clift served in the Newfoundland Executive Council as Minister of Mines and Agriculture from 1904 to 1909 and from 1918 to 1919. He was a District Grand Master in the Freemasons. He was named King's Counsel in 1903.

In 1891, Clift married Agnes Paterson.

He died at his home in St. John's on February 8, 1923.
