= John J. St. John =

Newfoundland politician

John J. St. John (1857–1930) was a merchant and politician in Newfoundland. He represented Harbour Main in the Newfoundland House of Assembly from 1897 to 1900 as a Conservative and from 1900 to 1904 as a Liberal.

The son of James St. John and Mary Hunt, he was born in Conception Harbour and was educated in Avondale, in Brigus and at Saint Bonaventure's College. After completing his education, he joined a firm of dry goods merchants. In 1888, St. John set up his own grocery business. He retired from politics in 1904 and returned to his business interests.

St. John married Margaret Hackett.
