= Alexander A. Parsons =

Newfoundland politician

Member of the Newfoundland House of Assembly
- In office 1893–1897
- Constituency: St. Barbe
- In office 1900–1904

Personal details
- Born: 1847 Harbour Grace, Newfoundland
- Died: 1932 (aged 84–85)
- Spouse: Marian Raven Thompson
- Occupation: Journalist, politician
- Profession: Journalist

Alexander A. Parsons (1847 – 1932) was a journalist and politician in Newfoundland. He represented St. Barbe in the Newfoundland House of Assembly from 1893 to 1897 and from 1900 to 1904.

He was born in Harbour Grace. He began work as a printer in Harbour Grace and later worked at newspapers in Boston and St. John's. From 1879 to 1904, he was editor for the Evening Telegram. Parsons married Marian Raven Thompson. Parsons was a frequent contributor to the Newfoundland Quarterly.

In 1888, Parsons and William James Herder, the publisher of the Telegram, were imprisoned for nine days for contempt after the newspaper published a reader's letter complaining of public drunkenness aboard a steamer while it was on circuit court service.

He retired from politics and journalism after being named superintendent for the Newfoundland penitentiary in 1904; he served in that post until 1926.
