= William Whiteway =

Newfoundland politician (1828–1908)

The Right Honourable Sir William Whiteway PC KCMG KC
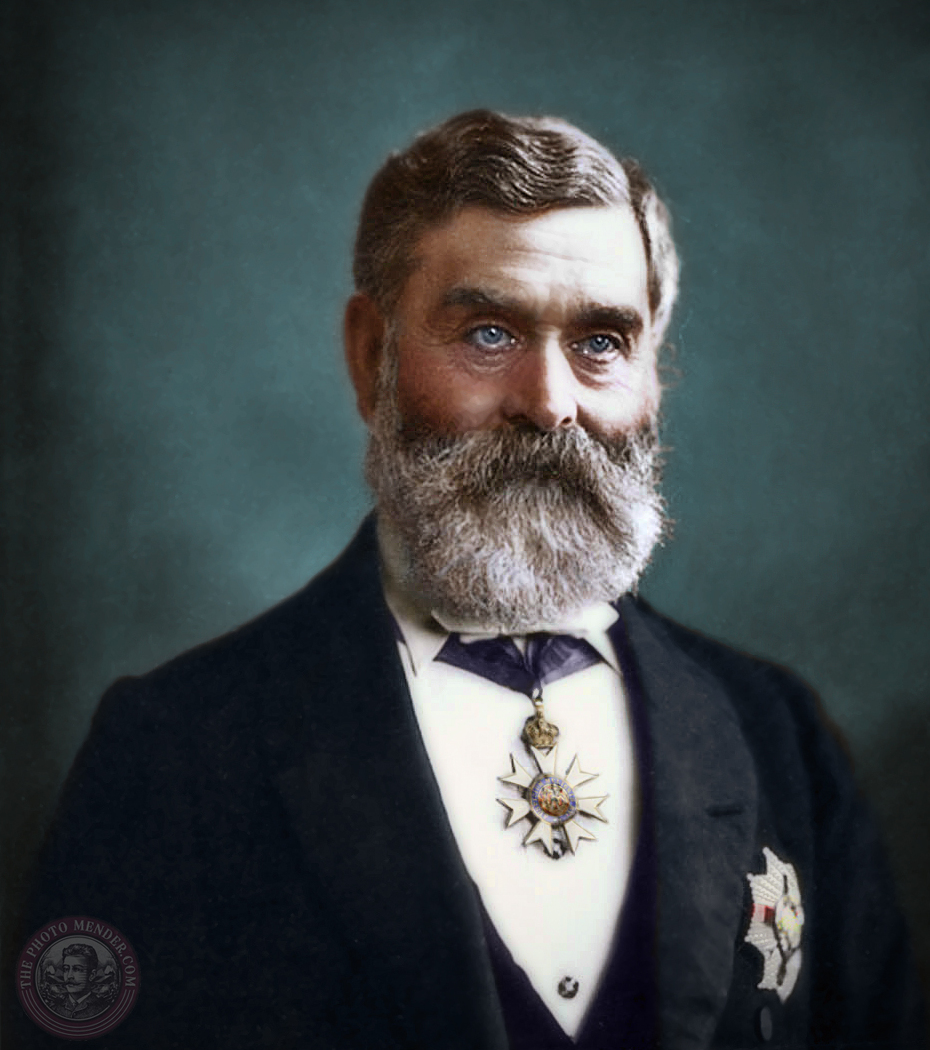

6th Premier of Newfoundland
- In office April 1878 – October 12, 1885
- Monarch: Victoria
- Governor: John Hawley Glover; Henry Maxse
- Preceded by: Frederick Carter
- Succeeded by: Robert Thorburn
- In office November 6, 1889 – April 11, 1894
- Monarch: Victoria
- Governor: Henry Arthur Blake; Terence O'Brien
- Preceded by: Robert Thorburn
- Succeeded by: Augustus F. Goodridge
- In office February 8, 1895 – October 28, 1897
- Monarch: Victoria
- Governor: Herbert Harley Murray
- Preceded by: Daniel Greene
- Succeeded by: James S. Winter
Ministerial and legislative offices
Solicitor General
In office 1874–1878
| Premier | Frederick Carter |
8th Speaker of the Newfoundland House of Assembly
In office 1865–1870
| Preceded by | Frederick Carter |
| Succeeded by | Thomas R. Bennett |
Member of the Newfoundland House of Assembly for Harbour Grace
In office February 27, 1895 – October 28, 1897 Serving with Eli Dawe and Henry Dawe
| Preceded by | Robert S. Munn |
| Succeeded by | William Horwood; William Oke |
Member of the Newfoundland House of Assembly for Trinity Bay
In office November 6, 1889 – October 16, 1894 Serving with Robert Bond (1889–1894); David Webber (1889–1893); James H. Watson (1893–1894)
| Preceded by | Walter B. Grieve; Robert Thorburn; Ellis C. Watson |
| Succeeded by | George W. Gushue; William Horwood; George M. Johnson |
In office November 8, 1873 – October 31, 1885 Serving with John Steer (1873–1878); John H. Warren (1873–1874); James H. Watson (1874–1882); John Rendell (1878–1882); Robert Bond (1882–1885); Joseph Boyd (1882–1885)
| Preceded by | Alexander Graham; Stephen Rendell |
| Succeeded by | Walter B. Grieve; Robert Thorburn; Ellis C. Watson |
Member of the Newfoundland House of Assembly for Twillingate and Fogo
In office 1858 – November 13, 1869 Serving with Thomas Knight
| Preceded by | William H. Ellis |
| Succeeded by | Charles Duder; Smith McKay |

Personal details
- Born: William Vallance Whiteway; April 1, 1828 Littlehempston, Devon, England
- Died: June 24, 1908 (aged 80) St. John's, Newfoundland
- Party: Conservative (1859-1885); Liberal (1885-1897)
- Spouse(s): Mary Lightbourne (m. 1862–1868) Catherine Anne Davies (m. 1872)
- Children: 6, including Harriet
- Occupation: Lawyer

Sir William Vallance Whiteway, PC, KCMG, KC (April 1, 1828 – June 24, 1908) was a Newfoundlander politician who was Premier of Newfoundland on three occasions.

== Life and career ==
Born in Littlehempston, Devon, England, Whiteway emigrated to Newfoundland in 1843 and entered the law in 1852. In 1859 he was elected to the House of Assembly as a member of the Conservative Party of Newfoundland and became a supporter of Canadian Confederation. He lost his seat in the 1869 election on confederation but returned in 1874 and served as Solicitor-General in the government of Sir Frederick Carter before becoming Premier in 1878 when he succeeded Carter as leader of the Conservatives. He was made a Queen's Counsel in 1865. While serving as Solicitor-General, Whiteway was one of the counsel representing the British Government before the Halifax Fisheries Commission, which adjudicated a dispute over north Atlantic fishing rights between the British Empire and the United States. The Commission gave an award of $5,500,000 to be paid by the United States to the British Government. Newfoundland received $1,000,000 as its share of the award.

Whiteway's major policy ambition was the construction of the transinsular railway spanning the island which was begun in 1881 and which he believed would spur economic development of the colony. In 1885 his Conservative party was destroyed by sectarian riots, known as The Harbour Grace Affray, at Harbour Grace which resulted in several Protestants leaving the Whiteway government in protest over its conciliatory attitude towards Catholics. Leading the dissenters was James Spearman Winter, Whiteway's Solicitor-General and grand master of Newfoundland's Orange Order.

The Orangemen joined with Robert Thorburn, an opponent of Whiteway's railway who felt that the colony should focus on the fishery, to form the Reform Party and win the 1885 election on a Protestant Rights platform.

In Opposition Whiteway founded a new Liberal Party of Newfoundland which won office in 1889 returning Whiteway as Premier on the issue of the railway. His government was forced to resign in 1894, however, due to allegations of electoral corruption in the previous year's election.

The Tories had argued that Whiteway's Liberals had promised jobs to Newfoundlanders who voted for him and filed petitions in the Supreme Court under the Corrupt Practices Act against fifteen Liberal members of the House alleging bribery and corruption. The members were tried and found guilty and their seats were declared vacant. On April 3, 1894, while the trials were still underway, Whiteway asked Governor of Newfoundland Sir Herbert Murray to dissolve the House of Assembly for a new election. The Governor refused and asked the Tory leader, Augustus F. Goodridge to form a government despite the fact that the Tories had only 12 seats to 21 for the Liberals. As Liberal seats were declared vacant due to guilty verdicts the standings in the House at the end of the process in August were 8 Conservatives, 9 Liberals and 19 vacancies. Whiteway himself had been found guilty, his seat declared vacant, and under the provisions of the law, he was barred from seeking election to the House of Assembly or sitting in government.

The Governor enabled Goodridge to remain in office by continually proroguing the House in order to prevent the government's fall through a Motion of No Confidence.

By-elections were held throughout the fall in which the Liberals retained the seats they had been disbarred from, losing just two, while picking up two from the Conservatives in return. The last by-election was held on November 12, 1894, a full year after the general election. In the interim, 21 by-elections had been held, resulting in a virtual return to the status quo.

Goodridge remained as premier until December 12, 1894, two days after the failure of two banks crippled the economy. Daniel J. Greene, acting Liberal leader, was sworn in as premier the next day.

His government passed the Disabilities Removal Act, which allowed all those members who had been disqualified to run as candidates as well as sit in government. Greene then resigned so that Whiteway could be sworn in as premier for a third time. In the face of Newfoundland's financial crisis following the bank crash, Whiteway's government began a new round of negotiations with Canada to bring Newfoundland into confederation but the discussions were unsuccessful.

Whiteway's Liberals lost the 1897 election, resulting in his retirement from politics. He was succeeded as Liberal leader by Sir Robert Bond.

== Family ==
The Hon. William Vallance Whiteway, Q.C., married as his second wife, October 22, 1872, Catherine Anne Davies, daughter of W. H. Davies, of Pictou, Nova Scotia. The couple, who resided at Riverview, St. John's, Newfoundland had three sons and three daughters. One daughter, Harriet Louise Whiteway, married, June 2, 1897, Peers Davidson, son of the Hon. Mr. Justice Davidson, Montreal.

Political offices
| Preceded by Sir Frederick Carter | Premier of Newfoundland; 1878–1885 | Succeeded by Sir Robert Thorburn |
| Preceded by Sir Robert Thorburn | Premier of Newfoundland; 1889–1894 | Succeeded by Augustus F. Goodridge |
| Preceded by Daniel J. Greene | Premier of Newfoundland; 1895–1897 | Succeeded by Sir James Spearman Winter |
