= James Spearman Winter =

10th Premier of Newfoundland (1897–1900)

The Honourable Sir James S. Winter KCMG
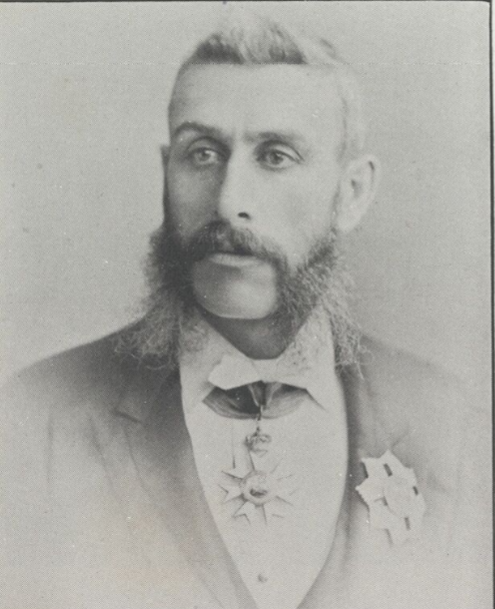
- Winter in 1894

10th Premier of Newfoundland
- In office October 28, 1897 – March 5, 1900
- Monarch: Victoria
- Governor: Herbert Harley Murray; Henry Edward McCallum
- Preceded by: William Whiteway
- Succeeded by: Robert Bond
Legislative offices
11th Speaker of the Newfoundland House of Assembly
In office 1877–1879
Preceded by	Prescott Emerson
Succeeded by	A. J. W. McNeilly
Member of the Newfoundland House of Assembly for Burin
In office October 28, 1897 – November 8, 1900 Serving with John E. Lake
Preceded by	Henry Gear; James J. Pitman
Succeeded by	Edward H. Davey; Henry Gear
In office November 12, 1892 – 1893 Serving with J. Sinclair Tait
Preceded by	Edward Rothwell
Succeeded by	William B. Payne
In office November 8, 1873 – October 31, 1885 Serving with Charles R. Ayre (1873–1878); James J. Rogerson (1878–1882); John E. Peters (1882–1885)
Preceded by	Frederick Carter; Edward Evans
Succeeded by	Henry LeMessurier
Member of the Newfoundland House of Assembly for Harbour Grace
In office October 31, 1885 – November 6, 1889 Serving with Charles Dawe and Joseph Godden
Preceded by	Ambrose Shea
Succeeded by	Eli Dawe; Robert S. Munn; William H. Whiteley

Personal details
- Born: January 1, 1845 Lamaline, Newfoundland Colony
- Died: October 6, 1911 (aged 66) Toronto, Ontario, Canada
- Party: Conservative (1873–1885; 1892–1900); Reform (1885–1889)
- Spouse: Emily Julia Coen (m. 1881)
- Children: 8, including James and Harry

Sir James Spearman Winter, KCMG (January 1, 1845 – October 6, 1911) was a Newfoundland politician who served as Premier of Newfoundland from 1897 to 1900.

== Early life and legal career ==
Winter was born on January 1, 1845 in Lamaline, Newfoundland to James M. Winter, a customs officer from St. John's, and Harriet Winter (née Pitman). After studying in the Protestant schools in his father's hometown, he began work as a mercantile clerk in 1859 for lumber merchants William and Henry Thomas. In 1861, he started his career in law by articling in the office of then-Premier Hugh Hoyles. He was called to the Newfoundland bar in 1866, subsequently starting an independent legal practice. He eventually entered into a partnership with Donald Morison in 1881.

As a jurist, Winter represented Newfoundland at the 1887-1888 fisheries conference in Washington and was senior counsel for the British government when Newfoundland was before the arbitration tribunal at the Hague in 1910 over a fisheries dispute.

== Politics ==
Winter entered politics when he was elected to the Newfoundland House of Assembly in 1873 as a Conservative supporter of Frederick Carter. He was the Speaker of the House from 1877 to 1879, and he served in the William Whiteway administration as Solicitor General from 1882 to 1885. Winter resigned along with a number of other Protestants as a result of the Harbour Grace Affray. Winter was grand master of the Orange Order and intended to launch a new Protestant party, but was sidelined when Sir Robert Thorburn formed the Reform Party.

Winter served as Attorney General under Thorburn from 1885 to 1889 when the government was defeated and Winter lost his seat. Winter was appointed to the Supreme Court in 1893 but resigned to lead the Tory Party (which had emerged from the former Reform Party). Winter and his party won the 1897 election.

The Winter government faced criticism over the granting of railway contracts and was accused by the Liberal opposition of selling out Newfoundland's interest to the Reid family as the minister of finance in Winter's government was also on Reid's payroll as his legal council while the contract was being negotiated. The scandal was a factor in the defeat of Winter's government in 1900.

== Legacy ==
The town of Winterton was named after him. His sons James and Harry both went on to serve as speakers for the Newfoundland assembly.
