= Robert Bond =

Newfoundland politician and Prime Minister (1900-1909)

The Right Honourable Sir Robert Bond PC KCMG
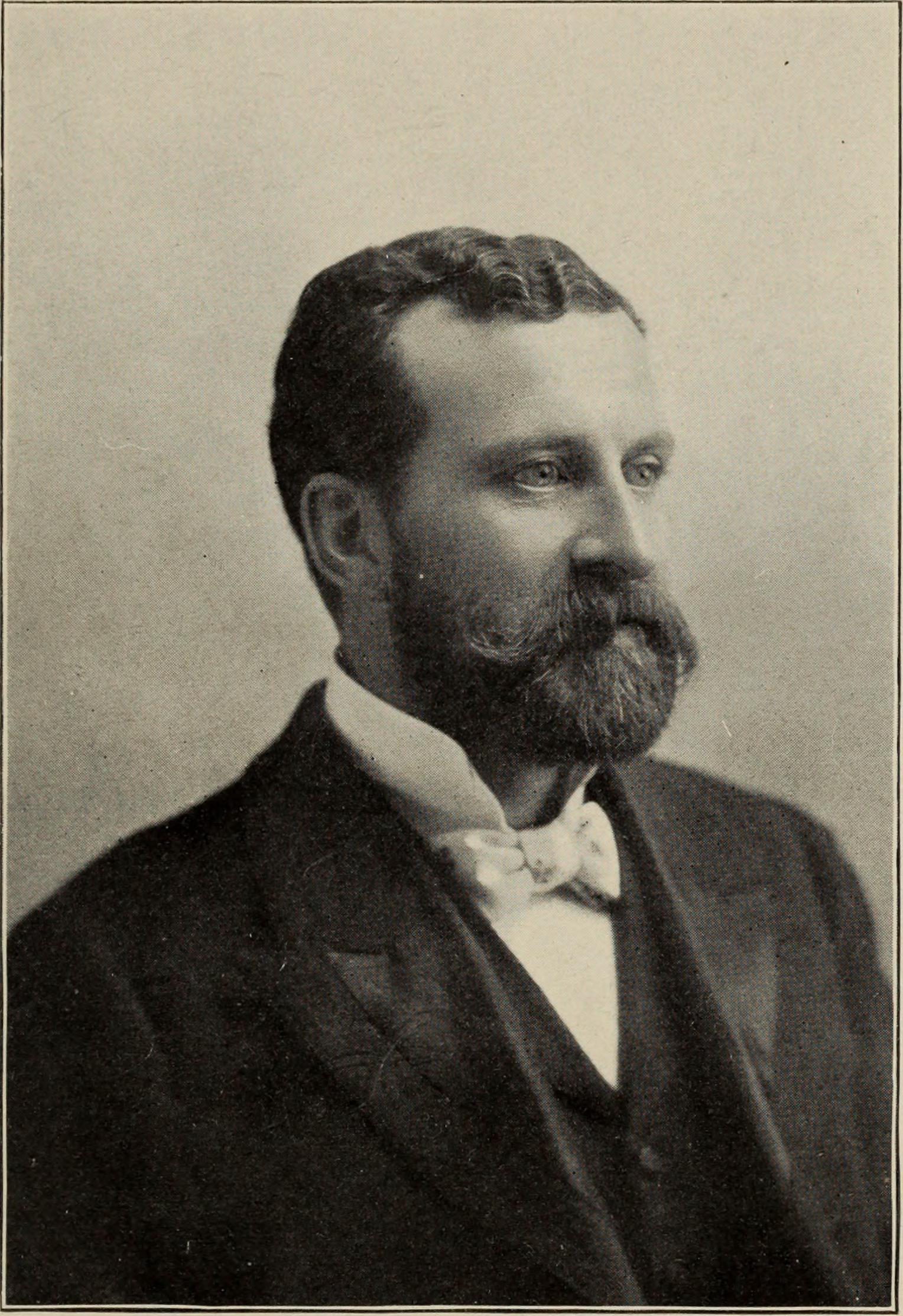
- Bond in 1902

1st Prime Minister of Newfoundland
- In office 26 September 1907 – 2 March 1909
- Monarch: Edward VII
- Governor: William MacGregor
- Preceded by: Himself (as Premier)
- Succeeded by: Edward Morris

11th Premier of Newfoundland
- In office 15 March 1900 – 26 September 1907
- Monarchs: Victoria; Edward VII
- Governor: Henry Edward McCallum; Charles Cavendish Boyle; William MacGregor
- Preceded by: James S. Winter
- Succeeded by: Himself (as Prime Minister)
Ministerial offices
Colonial Secretary
In office 15 March 1900 – 1909
Prime Minister	Himself
Preceded by	John A. Robinson
Succeeded by	Robert Watson
In office 8 February 1895 – 28 October 1897
Premier	William Whiteway
Preceded by	William Horwood
Succeeded by	John A. Robinson
In office 17 December 1889 – 1894
Premier	William Whiteway
Preceded by	Maurice Fenelon
Succeeded by	Alfred B. Morine
Legislative offices
14th Speaker of the Newfoundland House of Assembly
In office February 7, 1885 – 1886
Preceded by	Robert J. Kent
Succeeded by	A. J. W. McNeilly
Member of the Newfoundland House of Assembly for Twillingate
In office 16 September 1895 – 26 November 1914 Serving with Giles Foote (1895–1897); Augustus F. Goodridge (1895–1897); Donald Browning (1897–1899); Alan Goodridge (1897–1900); James A. Clift (1900–1914); George Roberts (1900–1913); Walter Jennings (1913–1914)
Preceded by	Jabez P. Thompson
Succeeded by	William Coaker
Member of the Newfoundland House of Assembly for Trinity Bay
In office 6 November 1889 – 16 October 1894 Serving with David Webber (1889–1893); William Whiteway (1889–1894); James H. Watson (1893–1894)
Preceded by	Walter B. Grieve; Robert Thorburn; Ellis C. Watson
Succeeded by	William H. Horwood; George M. Johnson; George W. Gushue
In office 6 November 1882 – 31 October 1885 Serving with Joseph Boyd and William Whiteway
Preceded by	John Rendell; James H. Watson
Succeeded by	Walter B. Grieve; Robert Thorburn; Ellis C. Watson
Member of the Newfoundland House of Assembly for Fortune Bay
In office 31 October 1885 – 6 November 1889
Preceded by	James O. Fraser
Succeeded by	John Studdy

Personal details
- Born: February 25, 1857 St. John's, Newfoundland Colony
- Died: 16 March 1927 (aged 70) Whitbourne, Newfoundland
- Party: Liberal
- Relatives: George John Bond (brother)
- Education: Wesleyan Collegiate Institute, Taunton

Sir Robert Bond KCMG PC (25 February 1857 – 16 March 1927) was a Newfoundlander politician who was the last Premier of Newfoundland Colony from 1900 to 1907 and the first prime minister of the Dominion of Newfoundland from 1907 to 1909 after the 1907 Imperial Conference conferred dominion status on the colony.

== Early life ==
Bond was born in St. John's, Newfoundland, the son of merchant John Bond. Bond grew up in St. John's until 1872 when his father died and left the family a good deal of money. He went to England where he was educated and came back to Newfoundland and articled under Sir William Whiteway.

== Political career ==
He got involved in politics in 1882 when he ran for the House of Assembly in Trinity Bay. He was speaker of the House of Assembly before the Whiteway government was defeated in 1885. He was elected to the House for Fortune Bay in the 1885 election, Trinity Bay in the 1889 and 1893 elections, and for Twillingate in the 1897, 1900, 1904, 1908, 1909, and 1913 elections. When Whiteway came back into power in 1889; Bond was made Colonial Secretary. He tried to negotiate free trade with the United States but it failed because of Canada's objection.

The government was defeated by judicial means in 1894; however, it came back to power shortly as a result of the bank crash of 1894. Bond became leader of the Liberal Party after Whiteway lost the 1897 election. He became Premier in 1900 after the Conservatives under Sir James Winter lost a vote of confidence. In 1902 he attended the Coronation of King Edward VII and Queen Alexandra and the conference of Colonial Premiers in London.

As Premier, he once again tried to negotiate free trade with the United States. It failed because of the objections of US senator Henry Cabot Lodge. Teddy Roosevelt tried to intervene but was not successful and it ended the friendship between the two nations. Relations between the United States and Newfoundland deteriorated to the point where, in November 1905 in Bonne Bay, local fisherman clashed with Americans trying to buy bait on shore. In 1904, Bond was re-elected with a clear majority. He went on to settle the French Shore issue which gave Newfoundland full control over the island. Following the 1907 Imperial Conference, Newfoundland and the other self-governing British colonies were given dominion status and Bond formally became the first prime minister of the Dominion of Newfoundland.

In 1907, his Attorney General Sir Edward Patrick Morris walked across the floor and started his own party called the Peoples Party. In the 1908 election the two parties came to a tie getting 18 seats each out of the 36 seats. Bond was asked by Governor William MacGregor if he could form a government and said that he could not because he would have to elect a government member as Speaker. Morris was asked and said he could and was sworn in as Prime Minister. His government failed as soon as Parliament was convened.

In the 1909 election, Morris won because he controlled government funds. Bond again led the Liberals into election in 1913 in an alliance with the Unionist Party of William Coaker. They failed to defeat Morris and Bond resigned as Liberal Leader in January 1914. In 1919 and again in 1923, the Liberals tried to persuade him to return. Bond responded with the prophetic response "If only I had the strength, how the fitters would fly; My poor country Newfoundland, the last stage". Bond died on his country estate in Whitbourne at the age of 70.

== Honours ==
Bond received several honours during his premiership. On 24 October 1901, Bond was invested as a Knight Commander of the Order of St Michael and St George (KCMG) during the visit to St John's of the Duke and Duchess of Cornwall and York (later King George V and Queen Mary). During his 1902 visit to London he was sworn a member of the Imperial Privy Council on 11 August 1902, following an announcement of the King's intention to make this appointment in the 1902 Coronation Honours list published in June that year. He was given the freedom of the city of Edinburgh during a visit to the city on 26 July 1902, and of the City of London, Manchester, and Bristol in 1907. When he visited Edinburgh in July 1902 ha was also awarded an honorary LL.D. by the University of Edinburgh.

Political offices
Preceded by Sir James Spearman Winter	Premier/Prime Minister of Newfoundland; 1900–1909	Succeeded by Sir Edward Patrick Morris
