= George Roberts (Newfoundland politician) =

Newfoundland politician

- Born: c. 1845
- Died: July 12, 1920
- Occupations: ship owner, trader, newspaper owner and politician in Newfoundland

George R. Roberts (c. 1845 – July 12, 1920) was a ship owner, trader, newspaper owner and politician in Newfoundland. He represented Twillingate from 1900 to 1913 in the Newfoundland House of Assembly as a Liberal.

== Career ==
He succeeded Jabez P. Thompson as owner and editor of the Twillingate Sun in 1895. Roberts was elected to the Newfoundland assembly in 1900 and was reelected in 1904, 1908 and 1909. In 1913, he was named a magistrate at Twillingate. Roberts sold the Sun to William B. Temple in 1910.

== Death ==
He died at Twillingate in 1920.
