= List of Newfoundland and Labrador by-elections =

The list of Newfoundland and Labrador by-elections includes every by-election held in the Canadian province of Newfoundland and Labrador. By-elections occur whenever there is a vacancy in the House of Assembly, although an imminent general election may allow the vacancy to remain until the dissolution of parliament. Starting in 1862, incumbent members were required to recontest their seats upon being appointed to the Cabinet. This requirement was temporarily abolished due to World War I in 1917 and was permanently abolished in 1928. These Ministerial by-elections were almost always uncontested.

== 51st General Assembly of Newfoundland and Labrador (2025–present) ==
No by-elections have yet been held in this period.

== 50th General Assembly of Newfoundland and Labrador (2021–2025) ==
By-election	Date	Incumbent	Party	Winner	Party	Cause	Retained
Waterford Valley	August 22, 2024	Tom Osborne	Liberal	Jamie Korab	Liberal	Resignation	Yes
Baie Verte-Green Bay	May 27, 2024	Brian Warr	Liberal	Lin Paddock	Progressive Conservative	Resignation	No
Fogo Island-Cape Freels	April 15, 2024	Derrick Bragg	Liberal	Jim McKenna	Progressive Conservative	Death	No
Conception Bay East–Bell Island	January 30, 2024	David Brazil	Progressive Conservative	Fred Hutton	Liberal	Resignation	No

== 49th General Assembly of Newfoundland and Labrador (2019–2021) ==
By-election	Date	Incumbent	Party	Winner	Party	Cause	Retained
Humber-Gros Morne	October 22, 2020	Dwight Ball	Liberal	Andrew Furey	Liberal	Retirement	Yes

== 48th General Assembly of Newfoundland and Labrador (2015–2019) ==
By-election	Date	Incumbent	Party	Winner	Party	Cause	Retained
Topsail-Paradise	November 2, 2018	Paul Davis	Progressive Conservative	Paul Dinn	Progressive Conservative	Resignation	Yes
Windsor Lake	September 20, 2018	Cathy Bennett	Liberal	Ches Crosbie	Progressive Conservative	Allegations of harassment	No
Mount Pearl North	November 21, 2017	Steve Kent	Progressive Conservative	Jim Lester	Progressive Conservative	Resignation to become CAO of Mount Pearl	Yes

== 47th General Assembly of Newfoundland and Labrador (2011–2015) ==
By-election	Date	Incumbent	Party	Winner	Party	Cause	Retained
Trinity-Bay de Verde	November 25, 2014	Charlene Johnson	Progressive Conservative	Steve Crocker	Liberal	Resignation	No
Humber East	November 25, 2014	Tom Marshall	Progressive Conservative	Stelman Flynn	Liberal	Resignation	No
Conception Bay South	November 5, 2014	Terry French	Progressive Conservative	Rex Hillier	Liberal	Resignation	No
St. George's-Stephenville East	August 26, 2014	Joan Shea	Progressive Conservative	Scott Reid	Liberal	Resignation	No
Virginia Waters	April 9, 2014	Kathy Dunderdale	Progressive Conservative	Cathy Bennett	Liberal	Resignation	No
Carbonear-Harbour Grace	November 26, 2013	Jerome Kennedy	Progressive Conservative	Sam Slade	Liberal	Resignation	No
Cartwright-L'Anse au Clair	June 25, 2013	Yvonne Jones	Liberal	Lisa Dempster	Liberal	Resignation to contest a federal by-election	Yes

== 46th General Assembly of Newfoundland and Labrador (2007–2011) ==
By-election	Date	Incumbent	Party	Winner	Party	Cause	Retained
Humber West	February 15, 2011	Danny Williams	Progressive Conservative	Vaughn Granter	Progressive Conservative	Resignation	Yes
Conception Bay East – Bell Island	December 2, 2010	Dianne Whalen	Progressive Conservative	David Brazil	Progressive Conservative	Death	Yes
Topsail	March 16, 2010	Elizabeth Marshall	Progressive Conservative	Paul Davis	Progressive Conservative	Appointed to the Senate	Yes
Terra Nova	November 26, 2009	Paul Oram	Progressive Conservative	Sandy Collins	Progressive Conservative	Resignation	Yes
The Straits – White Bay North	October 27, 2009	Trevor Taylor	Progressive Conservative	Marshall Dean	Liberal	Resignation	No
Cape St. Francis	August 27, 2008	Jack Byrne	Progressive Conservative	Kevin Parsons	Progressive Conservative	Death	Yes
Baie Verte-Springdale	August 27, 2008	Tom Rideout	Progressive Conservative	Kevin Pollard	Progressive Conservative	Resignation	Yes

== 45th General Assembly of Newfoundland and Labrador (2003–2007) ==
By-election	Date	Incumbent	Party	Winner	Party	Cause	Retained
Labrador West	February 13, 2007	Randy Collins	New Democratic	Jim Baker	Progressive Conservative	Resignation due to charges of corruption	No
Humber Valley	February 13, 2007	Kathy Goudie	Progressive Conservative	Dwight Ball	Liberal	Resignation due to a constituency expenses scandal	No
Port au Port	February 8, 2007	Jim Hodder	Progressive Conservative	Tony Cornect	Progressive Conservative	Resignation	Yes
Kilbride	February 8, 2007	Ed Byrne	Progressive Conservative	John Dinn	Progressive Conservative	Resignation	Yes
Ferryland	February 8, 2007	Loyola Sullivan	Progressive Conservative	Keith Hutchings	Progressive Conservative	Resignation	Yes
Signal Hill-Quidi Vidi	November 1, 2006	Jack Harris	New Democratic	Lorraine Michael	New Democratic	Resignation	Yes
Placentia and St. Mary's	February 21, 2006	Fabian Manning	Independent	Felix Collins	Progressive Conservative	Resignation to contest the 2006 Federal Election	No/Yes*
Exploits	June 23, 2005	Roger Grimes	Liberal	Clayton Forsey	Progressive Conservative	Resignation	No

*Manning was a former Progressive Conservative

== 44th General Assembly of Newfoundland and Labrador (1999–2003) ==
By-election	Date	Incumbent	Party	Winner	Party	Cause	Retained
Conception Bay South	November 12, 2002	Bob French	Progressive Conservative	Terry French	Progressive Conservative	Death	Yes
Bonavista North	July 24, 2002	Beaton Tulk	Liberal	Harry Harding	Progressive Conservative	Resignation to contest a federal by-election	No
Port de Grave	June 19, 2001	John Efford	Liberal	Roland Butler	Liberal	Resignation	Yes
Humber West	June 19, 2001	Paul Dicks	Liberal	Danny Williams	Progressive Conservative	Resignation	No
The Straits & White Bay North	January 30, 2001	Brian Tobin	Liberal	Trevor Taylor	Progressive Conservative	Resignation to contest the 2000 Federal Election	No
St. Barbe	January 30, 2001	Chuck Furey	Liberal	Wallace Young	Progressive Conservative	Resignation to contest the 2000 Federal Election	No
Trinity North	April 25, 2000	Doug Olford	Liberal	Ross Wiseman	Liberal	Resignation	Yes

== 43rd General Assembly of Newfoundland (1996–1999) ==
By-election	Date	Incumbent	Party	Winner	Party	Cause	Retained
St. John's West	July 21, 1997	Rex Gibbons	Liberal	Sheila Osborne	Progressive Conservative	Resignation to contest the 1997 Federal Election	No

== 42nd General Assembly of Newfoundland (1993–1996) ==
By-election	Date	Incumbent	Party	Winner	Party	Cause	Retained
Gander	October 10, 1995	Winston Baker	Liberal	Gary Vey	Liberal	Resignation	Yes
Grand Falls	June 27, 1995	Len Simms	Progressive Conservative	Mike Mackey	Progressive Conservative	Resignation	Yes
Placentia	February 21, 1994	Nick Careen	Progressive Conservative	Nick Careen	Progressive Conservative	Void Election	Yes

== 41st General Assembly of Newfoundland (1989–1993) ==
By-election	Date	Incumbent	Party	Winner	Party	Cause	Retained
Naskaupi	June 25, 1992	Jim Kelland	Liberal	Edward Roberts	Liberal	Resignation to provide a seat for Roberts	Yes
Ferryland	June 25, 1992	Charlie Power	Progressive Conservative	Loyola Sullivan	Progressive Conservative	Resignation	Yes
Baie Verte-White Bay	October 15, 1991	Tom Rideout	Progressive Conservative	Harold Small	Liberal	Resignation	No
Trinity North	February 19, 1991	Barry Hynes	Progressive Conservative	Doug Oldford	Liberal	Resignation following pleading guilty to sexual assault charges	No
St. John's East	December 11, 1990	Shannie Duff	Progressive Conservative	Jack Harris	New Democratic	Resignation to run for Mayor of St. John's	No
Trinity North	October 3, 1989	Charlie Brett	Progressive Conservative	Barry Hynes	Progressive Conservative	Resignation	Yes
Bay of Islands	May 20, 1989†	Eddie Joyce	Liberal	Clyde Wells	Liberal	Resignation to provide a seat for Wells	Yes

† Won by acclamation

== 40th General Assembly of Newfoundland (1985–1989) ==
By-election	Date	Incumbent	Party	Winner	Party	Cause	Retained
Waterford Kenmount	March 9, 1988	Gerry Ottenheimer	Progressive Conservative	Eric Gullage	Liberal	Appointed to the Senate	No
Windsor-Buchans	December 17, 1987	Graham Flight	Liberal	Clyde Wells	Liberal	Resignation to provide a seat for Wells	Yes
St. John's East Extern	December 9, 1986	Tom Hickey	Progressive Conservative	Kevin Parsons	Progressive Conservative	Resignation	Yes
St. John's East	December 9, 1986	William Marshall	Progressive Conservative	Gene Long	New Democratic	Resignation	No

== 39th General Assembly of Newfoundland (1982–1985) ==
By-election	Date	Incumbent	Party	Winner	Party	Cause	Retained
Menihek	October 9, 1984	Peter J. Walsh	Progressive Conservative	Peter Fenwick	New Democratic	Resignation to contest the 1984 Federal Election	No
Terra Nova	December 7, 1983	Tom Lush	Liberal	Glen Greening	Progressive Conservative	Resignation	No

== 38th General Assembly of Newfoundland ( 1979–1982 ==
By-election	Date	Incumbent	Party	Winner	Party	Cause	Retained
Bellevue	April 10, 1981	Don Jamieson	Liberal	Wilson Callan	Liberal	Resignation	Yes
Burgeo-Bay d'Espoir	November 29, 1979	Roger Simmons	Liberal	Harold Andrews	Progressive Conservative	Resignation to contest a federal by-election	No
St. Mary's-the Capes	October 30, 1979	Walter Carter	Progressive Conservative	Derrick Hancock	Liberal	Resignation to contest a federal by-election	No

== 37th General Assembly of Newfoundland (1975–1979) ==
By-election	Date	Incumbent	Party	Winner	Party	Cause	Retained
Twillingate	December 8, 1977	Joey Smallwood	Liberal	Bill Rowe	Liberal	Resignation	Yes
St. John's West	June 16, 1977	John Crosbie	Progressive Conservative	Hubert Kitchen	Liberal	Resignation to contest a federal by-election	No
Ferryland	June 16, 1977	Martin O'Brien	Liberal	Charlie Power	Progressive Conservative	By-election results voided	No
Ferryland	June 30, 1976	Charlie Power	Progressive Conservative	Martin O'Brien	Liberal	Void Election	No
Exploits	June 30, 1976	Stephen Mulrooney	Liberal	Hugh Twomey	Progressive Conservative	Void Election	No
Bonavista North	June 30, 1976	W. George Cross	Progressive Conservative	W. George Cross	Progressive Conservative	Void Election	Yes

== 36th General Assembly of Newfoundland (1972–1975) ==
By-election	Date	Incumbent	Party	Winner	Party	Cause	Retained
Hermitage	November 26, 1973	Roy L. Cheeseman	Progressive Conservative	Roger Simmons	Liberal	Resignation	No
Labrador South	August 31, 1972	Josiah Harvey	Liberal	Michael S. Martin	New Labrador Party	Void Election	No

== 35th General Assembly of Newfoundland (1971–1972) ==
No by-elections were held in this period.

== 34th General Assembly of Newfoundland (1966–1971) ==
By-election	Date	Incumbent	Party	Winner	Party	Cause	Retained
St. John's East	June 26, 1970	Gerry Ottenheimer	Progressive Conservative	William Marshall	Progressive Conservative	Resignation	Yes
Gander	October 20, 1967	Charles Granger	Liberal	Harold Collins	Progressive Conservative	Resignation to contest a federal by-election	No

== 33rd General Assembly of Newfoundland (1962–1966) ==
By-election	Date	Incumbent	Party	Winner	Party	Cause	Retained
Trinity North	February 18, 1963	Arthur S. Mifflin	Liberal	C. Maxwell Lane	Liberal	Appointed to the Supreme Court	Yes

== 32nd General Assembly of Newfoundland (1959–1962) ==
By-election	Date	Incumbent	Party	Winner	Party	Cause	Retained
Labrador South	March 19, 1962†	George Sellars	Liberal	Gerald I. Hill	Liberal	Death	Yes

† Won by acclamation

== 31st General Assembly of Newfoundland (1956–1959) ==
By-election	Date	Incumbent	Party	Winner	Party	Cause	Retained
St. John's South	June 18, 1957†	William J. Browne	Progressive Conservative	Rex Renouf	Progressive Conservative	Resignation to contest the 1957 Federal Election	Yes

† Won by acclamation

== 30th General Assembly of Newfoundland (1951–1956) ==
By-election	Date	Incumbent	Party	Winner	Party	Cause	Retained
St. John's West	March 9, 1954†	Peter Cashin	Progressive Conservative	William J. Browne	Progressive Conservative	Resignation to contest the 1953 Federal Election	Yes
Ferryland	September 25, 1952	Augustus Duffy	Progressive Conservative	Myles Murray	Liberal	Void Election	No
St. John's West	February 7, 1952	Oliver Vardy	Liberal	Malcolm Hollett	Progressive Conservative	Appointed Deputy Minister of Economic Development	No

† Won by acclamation

== 29th General Assembly of Newfoundland (1949–1951) ==
No by-elections were held in this period.

== Commission of Government (1934–1949) ==
The Newfoundland House of Assembly was suspended when the Commission of Government was created in 1934. It was revived following Confederation with Canada in 1949.

== 28th General Assembly of Newfoundland (1932–1934) ==
By-election	Date	Incumbent	Party	Winner	Party	Cause	Retained
Port de Grave	March 21, 1933	James S. Ayre	United Newfoundland	Ernest Gear	United Newfoundland	Resignation	Yes

== 27th General Assembly of Newfoundland (1928–1932) ==
By-election	Date	Incumbent	Party	Winner	Party	Cause	Retained
Placentia West	May 17, 1930	Michael S. Sullivan	Liberal-Conservative Progressive	Leo J. Murphy	Liberal	Death	No
Lewisporte	May 17, 1930	George F. Grimes	Fishermen's Protective Union	Helena Squires	Liberal	Death	Yes (Note: The Fishermen's Protective Union and the Liberal party operated as a coalition government.)
Bonavista North	May 17, 1930	Robert G. Winsor	Fishermen's Protective Union	Nathan G. Winsor	Liberal	Death	Yes
Burgeo	1928†	Walter M. Chambers	Liberal-Conservative Progressive	Arthur Barnes	Liberal	Resignation due to ill health	No

† Won by acclamation

== 26th General Assembly of Newfoundland (1924–1928) ==
By-election	Date	Incumbent	Party	Winner	Party	Cause	Retained
St. John's East	April 25, 1927	N. J. Vinnicombe	Liberal-Conservative-Progressive	William E. Brophy	Liberal-Progressive	Appointed Liquor Commissioner	No
Fortune Bay	October 25, 1926	William Warren	Independent	Harris M. Mosdell	Liberal-Progressive	Appointed to the Supreme Court	No
Burgeo-LaPoile	October 25, 1926	Walter M. Chambers	Liberal-Conservative-Progressive	Walter M. Chambers	Liberal-Conservative-Progressive	Sought reelection upon appointment as Minister of Public Works	Yes
Bonavista	October 27, 1924	Walter Stanley Monroe	Liberal-Conservative-Progressive	Walter Stanley Monroe	Liberal-Conservative-Progressive	Sought reelection upon appointment as Prime Minister and Minister of Education	Yes
Bonavista	October 27, 1924	William C. Winsor	Liberal-Conservative-Progressive	William C. Winsor	Liberal-Conservative-Progressive	Sought reelection upon appointment as Minister of Marine and Fisheries	Yes
Harbour Grace	July 3, 1924	John R. Bennett	Liberal-Conservative-Progressive	John R. Bennett	Liberal-Conservative-Progressive	Sought reelection upon appointment as Colonial Secretary	Yes
Harbour Grace	July 3, 1924	C. E. Russell	Liberal-Conservative-Progressive	C. E. Russell	Liberal-Conservative-Progressive	Sought reelection upon appointment as Minister of Public Works	Yes
St. John's West	June 1924†	John Chalker Crosbie	Liberal-Conservative-Progressive	John Chalker Crosbie	Liberal-Conservative-Progressive	Sought reelection upon appointment as Minister of Finance and Customs	Yes
St. John's East	June 1924†	William J. Higgins	Liberal-Conservative-Progressive	William J. Higgins	Liberal-Conservative-Progressive	Sought reelection upon appointment as Minister of Justice and Attorney General	Yes
Placentia-St. Mary's	June 1924†	William J. Walsh	Liberal-Conservative-Progressive	William J. Walsh	Liberal-Conservative-Progressive	Sought reelection upon appointment as Minister of Agriculture and Mines	Yes
Harbour Main	June 1924†	William J. Woodford	Liberal-Conservative-Progressive	William J. Woodford	Liberal-Conservative-Progressive	Sought reelection upon appointment as Minister of Posts and Telegraphs	Yes

† Won by acclamation

== 25th General Assembly of Newfoundland (1923–1924) ==
No by-elections were held in this period.

== 24th General Assembly of Newfoundland (1919–1923) ==
By-election	Date	Incumbent	Party	Winner	Party	Cause	Retained
Bay de Verde	1920	William H. Cave	Liberal Reform	William H. Cave	Liberal Reform	Void Election	Yes
St. John's West	January 24, 1920	Richard Squires	Liberal Reform	Richard Squires	Liberal Reform	Sought reelection upon appointment as Prime Minister and Colonial Secretary	Yes
St. John's West	January 24, 1920	Henry J. Brownrigg	Liberal Reform	Henry J. Brownrigg	Liberal Reform	Sought reelection upon appointment as Minister of Finance and Customs	Yes
Twillingate	January 24, 1920†	Walter Jennings	Fishermen's Protective Union	Walter Jennings	Fishermen's Protective Union	Sought reelection upon appointment as Minister of Public Works	Yes
Fortune Bay	January 24, 1920†	William Warren	Liberal Reform	William Warren	Liberal Reform	Sought reelection upon appointment as Minister of Justice and Attorney General	Yes
Bonavista	January 24, 1920†	William Coaker	Fishermen's Protective Union	William Coaker	Fishermen's Protective Union	Sought reelection upon appointment as Minister of Marine and Fisheries	Yes
Bay de Verde	January 24, 1920†	William H. Cave	Liberal Reform	William H. Cave	Liberal Reform	Sought reelection upon appointment as Minister of Shipping	Yes

† Won by acclamation

== 23rd General Assembly of Newfoundland (1913–1919) ==
By-election	Date	Incumbent	Party	Winner	Party	Cause	Retained
Twillingate	November 26, 1914†	Robert Bond	Liberal	William Coaker	Fishermen's Protective Union	Resignation	Yes
Bonavista	November 26, 1914†	William Coaker	Fishermen's Protective Union	Alfred B. Morine	Fishermen's Protective Union	Resignation to contest Twillingate	Yes

† Won by acclamation

== 22nd General Assembly of Newfoundland (1909–1913) ==
By-election	Date	Incumbent	Party	Winner	Party	Cause	Retained
Burin	November 27, 1911†	Edward Henry Davey	Liberal	Thomas LeFeuvre	People's	Death	No

† Won by acclamation

== 21st General Assembly of Newfoundland (1908–1909) ==
No by-elections were held in this period.

== 20th General Assembly of Newfoundland (1904–1908) ==
By-election	Date	Incumbent	Party	Winner	Party	Cause	Retained
Bonavista	November 6, 1906†	Alfred B. Morine	Conservative	Donald Morison	Conservative	Resignation to move to Ontario	Yes
Port de Grave	February 1, 1906	Alexander McLellan Mackay	Conservative	Charles Dawe	Conservative	Death	Yes

† Won by acclamation

== 19th General Assembly of Newfoundland (1900–1904) ==
By-election	Date	Incumbent	Party	Winner	Party	Cause	Retained
St. John's West	1903†	Edward Patrick Morris	Liberal	Edward Patrick Morris	Liberal	Sought reelection upon appointment as Minister of Justice and Attorney General	Yes
Bay de Verde	1902	Henry J. B. Woods	Liberal	Isaac Mercer	Liberal	Appointed Postmaster General	Yes
Trinity	1902	William Henry Horwood	Liberal	Robert Watson	Conservative	Appointed Chief Justice	No
Trinity	1902	George M. Johnson	Liberal	William Warren	Conservative	Appointed to the Supreme Court	No

† Won by acclamation

== 18th General Assembly of Newfoundland (1897–1900) ==
By-election	Date	Incumbent	Party	Winner	Party	Cause	Retained
St. John's East	November 9, 1899	James Patrick Fox	Liberal	John Dwyer	Liberal	Death	Yes
Fortune Bay	November 9, 1899	Henry Hayward	Conservative	Charles Way	Liberal	Seat Vacant	No
Placentia and St. Mary's	May 25, 1899	William J. S. Donnelly	Conservative	Richard T. McGrath	Liberal	Sought reelection upon appointment as Minister of Finance and Customs	No
Trinity	April 29, 1898†	Levi March	Conservative	John A. Robinson	Conservative	Resignation	Yes
Harbour Main	November 29, 1897†	William Woodford	Conservative	William Woodford	Conservative	Sought reelection upon appointment as Chairman of the Board of Works	Yes
Fogo	November 29, 1897†	Thomas C. Duder	Conservative	Thomas C. Duder	Conservative	Sought reelection upon appointment as Surveyor General	Yes
Burin	November 29, 1897†	James S. Winter	Conservative	James S. Winter	Conservative	Sought reelection upon appointment as Attorney General	Yes
Bonavista	November 29, 1897†	John A. Robinson	Conservative	Alfred B. Morine	Conservative	Appointed to the Legislative Council	Yes

† Won by acclamation

== 17th General Assembly of Newfoundland (1893–1897) ==
By-election	Date	Incumbent	Party	Winner	Party	Cause	Retained
Twillingate	September 16, 1895†	Jabez P. Thompson	Liberal	Robert Bond	Liberal	Resignation to provide a seat for Bond	Yes
St. John's West	February 27, 1895†	Patrick J. Scott	Liberal	Patrick J. Scott	Liberal	Sought reelection upon appointment as Receiver General	Yes
St. John's West	February 27, 1895†	George Tessier	Liberal	Edward Patrick Morris	Liberal	Resignation to provide a seat for Morris	Yes
Harbour Grace	February 27, 1895†	Robert Stewart Munn	Conservative	William Whiteway	Liberal	Death	No
Harbour Grace	February 27, 1895†	Eli Dawe	Liberal	Eli Dawe	Liberal	Sought reelection upon appointment as Chairman of the Board of Works	Yes
Bay de Verde	February 27, 1895†	Sydney Woods	Liberal	Henry J. B. Woods	Liberal	Resignation to provide a seat for Henry Woods	Yes
St. George's	November 12, 1894	James W. Keating	Liberal	Michael H. Carty	Conservative	Void Election and Disqualification	No
St. John's West	November 10, 1894	Edward Patrick Morris	Liberal	Patrick J. Scott	Liberal	Void Election and Disqualification	Yes
St. John's West	November 10, 1894	James C. Tessier	Liberal	George Tessier	Liberal	Void Election and Disqualification	Yes
St. John's West	November 10, 1894	Martin W. Furlong	Liberal	Thomas P. Jackman	Liberal	Void Election and Disqualification	Yes
St. John's East	November 10, 1894	James Patrick Fox	Liberal	John P. Fox	Liberal	Void Election and Disqualification	Yes
St. John's East	November 10, 1894	Thomas J. Murphy	Liberal	Charles Hutton	Liberal	Void Election and Disqualification	Yes
Placentia and St. Mary's	November 10, 1894	James Francis McGrath	Liberal	Richard T. McGrath	Liberal	Void Election and Disqualification	Yes
Placentia and St. Mary's	November 10, 1894	George Henry Emerson	Liberal	Michael Tobin	Liberal	Void Election and Disqualification	Yes
Placentia and St. Mary's	November 10, 1894	William J. S. Donnelly	Conservative	John T. Dunphy	Liberal	Sought reelection upon appointment as Receiver General	No
Burin	November 10, 1894	James Sinclair Tait	Liberal	James J. Pitman	Liberal	Void Election and Disqualification	Yes
Burin	November 10, 1894	William B. Payne	Liberal	Henry Gear	Liberal	Void Election and Disqualification	Yes
Twillingate	October 16, 1894	Michael T. Knight	Conservative	Giles Foote	Liberal	Sought reelection upon appointment as Surveyor General	No
Trinity	October 16, 1894	William Whiteway	Liberal	William Henry Horwood	Liberal	Void Election and Disqualification	Yes
Trinity	October 16, 1894	Robert Bond	Liberal	George W. Gushue	Liberal	Void Election and Disqualification	Yes
Trinity	October 16, 1894	James H. Watson	Liberal	George M. Johnson	Liberal	Void Election	Yes
Fogo	October 2, 1894	Thomas C. Duder	Conservative	Thomas C. Duder	Conservative	Sought reelection upon appointment as Financial Secretary	Yes
Bonavista	October 2, 1894	Donald Morison	Conservative	Donald Morison	Conservative	Sought reelection upon appointment as Attorney General	Yes
Bonavista	October 2, 1894	Alfred B. Morine	Conservative	Alfred B. Morine	Conservative	Sought reelection upon appointment as Colonial Secretary	Yes
Burgeo and LaPoile	September 10, 1894	James Murray	Independent	Henry Y. Mott	Conservative	Void Election and Disqualification	No
Bay de Verde	May 22, 1894	Henry J. B. Woods	Liberal	Sydney Woods	Liberal	Void Election and Disqualification	Yes
Bay de Verde	May 22, 1894	George E. Moores	Liberal	John B. Ayre	Conservative	Void Election and Disqualification	No

† Won by acclamation

== 16th General Assembly of Newfoundland (1889–1893) ==
By-election	Date	Incumbent	Party	Winner	Party	Cause	Retained
Burin	November 12, 1892	Edward Rothwell	Liberal	James S. Winter	Conservative	Death	No
Trinity	January 15, 1890	William Whiteway	Liberal	William Whiteway	Liberal	Sought reelection upon appointment as Attorney General	Yes
Trinity	January 15, 1890	Robert Bond	Liberal	Robert Bond	Liberal	Sought reelection upon appointment as Colonial Secretary	Yes
Bay de Verde	January 15, 1890	Henry J. B. Woods	Liberal	Henry J. B. Woods	Liberal	Sought reelection upon appointment as Surveyor General	Yes
St. John's West	January 8, 1890†	James Day	Liberal	James Day	Liberal	Sought reelection upon appointment as Chairman of the Board of Works	Yes
Placentia-St. Mary's	January 8, 1890†	Richard O'Dwyer	Liberal	Richard O'Dwyer	Liberal	Sought reelection upon appointment as Receiver General	Yes
Fortune Bay	January 8, 1890†	John Studdy	Liberal	John Studdy	Liberal	Sought reelection upon appointment as Financial Secretary	Yes

† Won by acclamation

== 15th General Assembly of Newfoundland (1885–1889) ==
By-election	Date	Incumbent	Party	Winner	Party	Cause	Retained
Bonavista	November 10, 1888	Abram Kean	Reform	Donald Morison	Reform	Resignation	Yes
St. John's East	November 12, 1887	Ambrose Shea	Liberal	Robert John Parsons	Liberal	Appointed Governor of the Bahamas	Yes
St. John's East	November 9, 1886	Robert John Kent	Liberal	Thomas J. Murphy	Liberal	Resignation	Yes
Placentia and St. Mary's	November 1, 1886†	William J. S. Donnelly	Reform	William J. S. Donnelly	Reform	Sought reelection upon appointment as Receiver General	Yes
Bonavista	June 12, 1886	James L. Noonan	Reform	Alfred B. Morine	Independent	Sought reelection upon appointment as Receiver General	No
Twillingate-Fogo	June 9, 1886†	Michael T. Knight	Reform	Michael T. Knight	Reform	Sought reelection upon appointment as Financial Secretary	Yes
Carbonear	June 9, 1886†	Alfred Penney	Reform	Alfred Penney	Reform	Sought reelection upon appointment as Surveyor General	Yes

† Won by acclamation

== 14th General Assembly of Newfoundland (1882–1885) ==
No by-elections were held in this period.

== 13th General Assembly of Newfoundland (1878–1882) ==
By-election	Date	Incumbent	Party	Winner	Party	Cause	Retained
Ferryland	November 2, 1880†	James Gervé Conroy	Opposition	Augustus F. Goodridge	Opposition	Appointed stipendiary magistrate	Yes

† Won by acclamation

== 12th General Assembly of Newfoundland (1874–1878) ==
No by-elections were held in this period.

== 11th General Assembly of Newfoundland (1873–1874) ==
By-election	Date	Incumbent	Party	Winner	Party	Cause	Retained
Harbour Grace	January 17, 1874†	Frederick Carter	Conservative	Ambrose Shea	Conservative	Chose to sit for Twillingate and Fogo	Yes

== 10th General Assembly of Newfoundland (1869–1873) ==
By-election	Date	Incumbent	Party	Winner	Party	Cause	Retained
Trinity Bay	October 26, 1871†	Thomas H. Ridley	Conservative	Alexander Graham	Anti-Confederate	Resignation due to his firm becoming insolvent	No
Bonavista Bay	October 26, 1871†	James L. Noonan	Anti-Confederate	James L. Noonan	Anti-Confederate	Sought reelection upon appointment as Colonial Secretary	Yes
St. John's West	January 16, 1871	Thomas Talbot	Anti-Confederate	Maurice Fenelon	Anti-Confederate	Appointed to the Legislative Council	Yes
Trinity Bay	September 17, 1870	Robert Alsop	Anti-Confederate	John Henry Warren	Conservative	Sought reelection upon appointment as Colonial Secretary	No
Placentia and St. Mary's	September 1870†	Henry Renouf	Anti-Confederate	Henry Renouf	Anti-Confederate	Sought reelection upon appointment as Surveyor General	Yes
Harbour Main	August 1870†	Joseph Ignatius Little	Anti-Confederate	Joseph Ignatius Little	Anti-Confederate	Sought reelection upon appointment as Attorney General	Yes
Ferryland	August 1870†	Thomas Glen	Anti-Confederate	Thomas Glen	Anti-Confederate	Sought reelection upon appointment as Receiver General	Yes
Bay de Verde	April 5, 1870	John Bemister	Conservative	James J. Rogerson	Conservative	Appointed Sheriff of the Northern District	Yes
St. John's West	March 31, 1870†	Henry Renouf	Anti-Confederate	Lewis Tessier	Anti-Confederate	Chose to sit for Placentia and St. Mary's	Yes

† Won by acclamation

== 9th General Assembly of Newfoundland (1865–1869) ==
By-election	Date	Incumbent	Party	Winner	Party	Cause	Retained
Harbour Grace	November 7, 1868	John Hayward	Conservative	Joseph Godden	Conservative	Appointed a judge	Yes
Harbour Main	November 28, 1867	Charles Furey	Opposition	Joseph Ignatius Little	Opposition	Resignation	Yes
Port de Grave	January 14, 1867	John Leamon	Conservative	Robert John Pinsent	Conservative	Death	Yes
Trinity Bay	October 29, 1866	Stephen March	Conservative	Robert Alsop	Conservative	Resignation	Yes
St. John's West	June 2, 1866	John Casey	Conservative	Peter Brennan	Opposition	Sought reelection upon appointment as Chairman of the Board of Works	No

== 8th General Assembly of Newfoundland (1861–1865) ==
By-election	Date	Incumbent	Party	Winner	Party	Cause	Retained
Bonavista Bay	1864	Matthew W. Walbank	Conservative	Frederick J. Wyatt	Conservative	Appointed Registrar and Chief Clerk to the Supreme Court	Yes
Carbonear	1863	Edmund Hanrahan	Liberal	John Rorke	Conservative	Resignation	No
St. John's East	February 28, 1862	John Kavanagh	Liberal	John Kavanagh	Liberal	Resignation	Yes
Placentia and St. Mary's	1861	W. G. Flood	Liberal	Pierce M. Barron	Liberal	Death	Yes
Harbour Grace	November 1861	—N/a	Vacant	John Hayward	Conservative	No return made at general election	—N/a
Harbour Grace	November 1861	—N/a	Vacant	Henry J. Moore	Conservative	No return made at general election	—N/a

== 7th General Assembly of Newfoundland (1859–1861) ==
By-election	Date	Incumbent	Party	Winner	Party	Cause	Retained
Placentia and St. Mary's	1860	John Delaney	Liberal	Richard McGrath	Liberal	Appointed Postmaster General	Yes
Burgeo and LaPoile	1860	James Seaton	Conservative	Hugh Hoyles	Conservative	Resignation	Yes
Harbour Grace	November 1860†	James Luke Prendergast	Liberal	James Luke Prendergast	Liberal	Void Election	Yes

† Won by acclamation

== 6th General Assembly of Newfoundland (1855–1859) ==
By-election	Date	Incumbent	Party	Winner	Party	Cause	Retained
Twillingate and Fogo	1858	William Henry Ellis	Conservative	William Whiteway	Conservative	Death	Yes
St. John's West	1858	Philip Francis Little	Liberal	J. J. Gearin	Liberal	Appointed to the Supreme Court	Yes
St. John's West	1857	John Fox	Liberal	John Casey	Liberal	Appointed to the Legislative Council	Yes
St. John's East	1857	Peter Winser	Liberal	John Kavanagh	Liberal	Resignation upon appointment as a Magistrate	Yes

== 5th General Assembly of Newfoundland (1852–1854) ==
No by-elections were held in this period.

== 4th General Assembly of Newfoundland (1848–1852) ==
By-election	Date	Incumbent	Party	Winner	Party	Cause	Retained
St. John's	1850	Laurence O'Brien	Liberal	Philip Francis Little	Liberal	Appointed to the Council	Yes

== 3rd General Assembly of Newfoundland (1842–1847) ==
By-election	Date	Incumbent	Party	Winner	Party	Cause	Retained
Trinity Bay	1846	Richard Barnes	Conservative	Thomas Bulley Job	Conservative	Death	Yes
St. John's	1843	William Carson	Liberal	Robert John Parsons	Liberal	Death	Yes

== 2nd General Assembly of Newfoundland (1837–1841) ==
By-election	Date	Incumbent	Party	Winner	Party	Cause	Retained
Conception Bay	December 1840	Anthony Godfrey	Liberal	—N/a (Note: There was no return in this by-election due to rioting.)	Vacant	Death	—N/a
St. John's	May 1840	Patrick Morris	Liberal	Laurence O'Brien	Liberal	Appointed to the Council as Colonial Treasurer	Yes

== 1st General Assembly of Newfoundland (1832–1836) ==
By-election	Date	Incumbent	Party	Winner	Party	Cause	Retained
St. John's	December 1833†	William Thomas	Conservative	William Carson	Liberal	Appointed to the Council	No
Trinity Bay	1833†	John Bingley Garland	Conservative	William Bickford Row	Conservative	Appointed to the Council	Yes

† Won by acclamation

== See also ==
- List of federal by-elections in Canada
