= 16th General Assembly of Newfoundland =

Colony of Newfoundland legislature

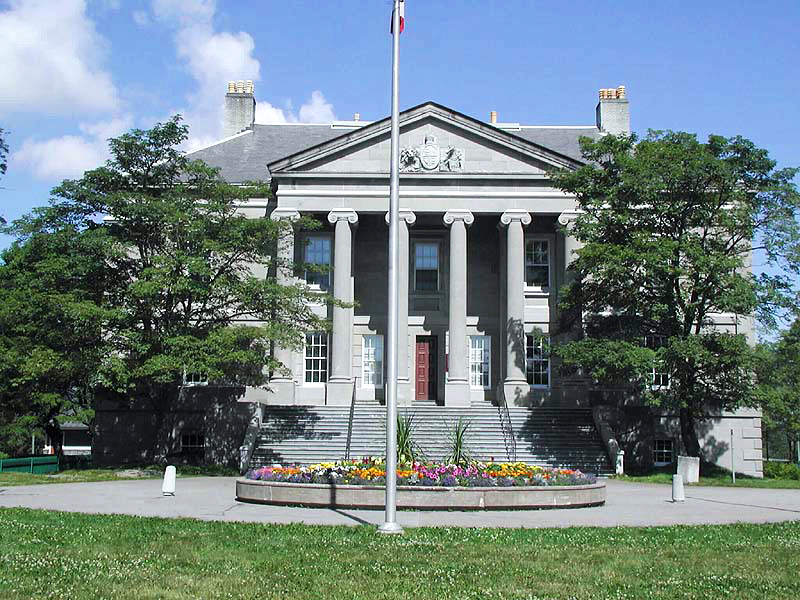
- Colonial Building seat of the Newfoundland government and the House of Assembly from January 28, 1850, to July 28, 1959.

History
- Founded: 1890
- Disbanded: 1893
- Preceded by: 15th General Assembly of Newfoundland
- Succeeded by: 17th General Assembly of Newfoundland

Leadership
- Premier: William Whiteway, Liberal

Elections
- Last election: 1889 Newfoundland general election

The members of the 16th General Assembly of Newfoundland were elected in the Newfoundland general election held in November 1889. The general assembly sat from 1890 to 1893.

The Liberal Party led by William Whiteway formed the government.

George Emerson was chosen as speaker.

Sir Terence O'Brien served as colonial governor of Newfoundland.

== Members of the Assembly ==
The following members were elected to the assembly in 1889:

Member	Electoral district	Affiliation	First elected / previously elected
Edward White	Bay de Verde	Liberal Party	1889
Henry J. B. Woods	Bay de Verde	Liberal Party	1889
Donald Morison	Bonavista	Reform	1888
Samuel Blandford	Bonavista	Liberal Party	1889
Alfred B. Morine	Bonavista	Reform	1886
James Murray	Burgeo-La Poile	Independent	1889
Edward Rothwell	Burin	Liberal Party	1889
Dr. James S. Tait	Burin	Liberal Party	1889
James S. Winter (1892)	Burin	Conservative Party	1873, 1892
William Duff	Carbonear	Liberal Party	1889
George Shea	Ferryland	Independent	1885
Daniel J. Greene	Ferryland	Independent	1878
James Rolls	Fogo	Reform	1885
John Studdy	Fortune Bay	Liberal Party	1889
William H. Whiteley	Harbour Grace	Liberal Party	1889
Eli Dawe	Harbour Grace	Liberal Party	1889
Robert S. Munn	Harbour Grace	Reform	1889
Frank J. Morris	Harbour Main	Liberal Party	1889
William Woodford	Harbour Main	Liberal Party	1889
George Emerson	Placentia and St. Mary's	Liberal Party	1885
Richard O'Dwyer	Placentia and St. Mary's	Liberal Party	1885
James McGrath	Placentia and St. Mary's	Liberal Party	1889
James A. Clift	Port de Grave	Liberal Party	1889
George C. Fearn	St. Barbe	Liberal Party	1889
Michael H. Carty	St. George's	Reform	1882 (Note: First elected as a Liberal)
Thomas J. Murphy	St. John's East	Liberal Party	1886
Dr. John J. Dearin	St. John's East	Liberal Party	1873, 1882, 1889
Jeremiah Halleran	St. John's East	Liberal Party	1889
James Patrick Fox (1890)	St. John's East	Liberal Party	1890
Edward Morris	St. John's West	Liberal Party	1885
James Day	St. John's West	Liberal Party	1889
Lawrence Gearin	St. John's West	Liberal Party	1889
William Whiteway	Trinity	Liberal Party	1859, 1873, 1889
Robert Bond	Trinity	Liberal Party	1882
David C. Webber	Trinity	Liberal Party	1889
Edward P. Burgess	Twillingate	Liberal Party	1889
Jabez P. Thompson	Twillingate	Liberal Party	1882, 1889
Thomas Peyton	Twillingate	Liberal Party	1889

== By-elections ==
By-elections were held to replace members for various reasons:

Electoral district	Member elected	Affiliation	Election date	Reason
Burin	James S. Winter (Note: Winter was named to the Supreme Court in May 1893)	Conservative	1892	E Rothwell died in 1892
