= 17th General Assembly of Newfoundland =

Colony of Newfoundland legislature

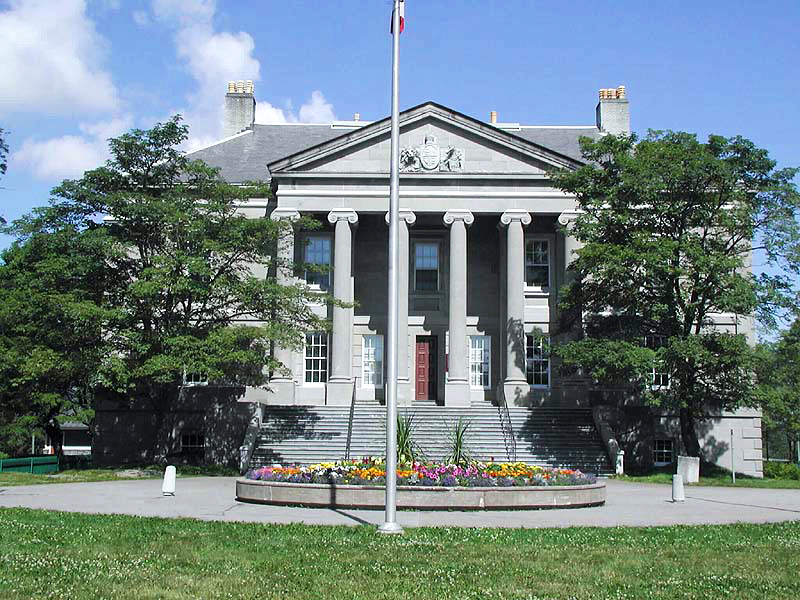
- Colonial Building seat of the Newfoundland government and the House of Assembly from January 28, 1850, to July 28, 1959.

History
- Founded: 1894
- Disbanded: 1897
- Preceded by: 16th General Assembly of Newfoundland
- Succeeded by: 18th General Assembly of Newfoundland

Leadership
- Premier: William Whiteway (1894), Liberal Party
- Premier: Augustus F. Goodridge (1894), Tory Party
- Premier: Daniel J. Greene (1894–1895), Liberal Party
- Premier: William Whiteway (1895–1897), Liberal Party

Elections
- Last election: 1893 Newfoundland general election

The members of the 17th General Assembly of Newfoundland were elected in the Newfoundland general election held in November 1893. The general assembly sat from 1894 to 1897.

The Liberal Party led by William Whiteway formed the government. The Tory Party filed petitions against 15 Liberals including Whiteway and James Murray, an independent, alleging corrupt practices during the election; the results of those elections were set aside. The Tory Party temporarily held the majority and formed a government led by Augustus F. Goodridge in 1894. Following the by-elections, the Liberals regained the majority and formed a government led by Daniel J. Greene. After Whiteway won re-election in a by-election, he became Premier again.

George Emerson was chosen as speaker.

Sir Terence O'Brien served as colonial governor of Newfoundland until 1895, when he was replaced by Sir Herbert Harley Murray.

On December 8, 1894, London banks suspended credit to the Commercial Bank of Newfoundland and requested payment on some of its loans. The bank was unable to meet these obligations and requested its merchant customers to repay their loans; the merchants, themselves financially strapped, were unable to comply. On October 10, known as Black Monday, the Commercial Bank closed. This caused a run by customers on the two remaining banks, the Union Bank of Newfoundland and the Savings Bank of Newfoundland. The Savings Bank was able to cash a large cheque at the Union Bank, but the Union Bank was subsequently forced to close. Neither of the two closed banks would ever reopen. This resulted in the devaluation of Newfoundland's currency, the shutdown of many businesses and widespread unemployment in the colony. Early in 1895, banks from Canada opened branches in Newfoundland to fill the void. The value of the Newfoundland dollar was set to the same value as the Canadian dollar.

== Members of the Assembly ==
The following members were elected to the assembly in 1893:

Member	Electoral district	Affiliation	First elected / previously elected
Henry J. B. Woods	Bay de Verde	Liberal	1889
George E. Moores	Bay de Verde	Liberal	1893
Sydney Woods (1894)	Bay de Verde	Liberal	1894
John B. Ayre (1894)	Bay de Verde	Tory	1894
Donald Morison	Bonavista	Tory	1888
Alfred B. Morine	Bonavista	Tory	1886
Samuel Blandford	Bonavista	Tory	1889
James Murray	Burgeo-La Poile	Independent	1889
Henry Y. Mott (1894)	Burgeo-La Poile	Tory	1894
Dr. James S. Tait	Burin	Liberal	1889
William B. Payne	Burin	Liberal	1893
James J. Pitman (1894)	Burin	Liberal	1894
Henry Gear (1894)	Burin	Liberal	1894
William Duff	Carbonear	Liberal	1889
Michael P. Cashin	Ferryland	Liberal	1893
Daniel J. Greene	Ferryland	Liberal	1878
Thomas C. Duder	Fogo	Tory	1893
James O. Fraser, Jr.	Fortune Bay	Tory	1893
Henry Dawe	Harbour Grace	Tory	1893
Robert S. Munn	Harbour Grace	Tory	1889
Eli Dawe	Harbour Grace	Liberal	1889
William Whiteway (1895)	Harbour Grace	Liberal	1859, 1873, 1889, 1895
Frank J. Morris	Harbour Main	Liberal	1889
William Woodford	Harbour Main	Liberal	1889
James McGrath	Placentia and St. Mary's	Liberal	1889
George Emerson	Placentia and St. Mary's	Liberal	1885
Richard T. McGrath (1894)	Placentia and St. Mary's	Liberal	1894
Michael Tobin (1894)	Placentia and St. Mary's	Liberal	1882, 1894
William J. S. Donnelly	Placentia and St. Mary's	Tory	1878, 1893
John T. Dunphy	Placentia and St. Mary's	Liberal (1894)	1894
Charles Dawe	Port de Grave	Tory	1878, 1893
Alexander A. Parsons	St. Barbe	Liberal	1893
James W. Keating	St. George's	Liberal	1893
Michael H. Carty (1894)	St. George's	Liberal	1882, 1894
James Patrick Fox	St. John's East	Liberal	1893
Thomas J. Murphy	St. John's East	Liberal	1886
John P. Fox (1894)	St. John's East	Liberal	1894
Charles Hutton (1894)	St. John's East	Liberal	1894
Lawrence O'Brien Furlong	St. John's East	Tory	1893
Edward Morris	St. John's West	Liberal	1885
James C. Tessier	St. John's West	Liberal	1893
Martin W. Furlong	St. John's West	Liberal	1893
Patrick J. Scott (1894)	St. John's West	Liberal	1873, 1894
G. J. Tessier (1894)	St. John's West	Liberal	1894
Thomas P. Jackman (1894)	St. John's West	Liberal	1894
William Whiteway	Trinity	Liberal	1859, 1873, 1889
Robert Bond	Trinity	Liberal	1882
James H. Watson	Trinity	Liberal	1874, (Note: First elected as a Conservative) 1893
William H. Horwood (1894)	Trinity	Liberal	1894
George W. Gushue (1894)	Trinity	Liberal	1894
George M. Johnson (1894)	Trinity	Liberal	1894
Jabez P. Thompson	Twillingate	Liberal	1889
Robert Bond	Twillingate	Liberal	1882
Gilles Foote (1894)	Twillingate	Liberal	1894
Augustus F. Goodridge	Twillingate	Tory	1880, 1893
Michael T. Knight	Twillingate	Tory	1885, 1893

== By-elections ==
By-elections were held to replace members for various reasons:

Electoral district	Member elected	Affiliation	Election date	Reason
Bay de Verde	Sydney Woods	Liberal	May 22, 1894	Results of 1893 election set aside
Bay de Verde	John B. Ayre	Tory	May 22, 1894	Results of 1893 election set aside
Burgeo-La Poile	Henry Y. Mott	Tory	September 10, 1894	Results of 1893 election set aside
Bonavista	Donald Morison	Tory	October 2, 1894	D Morrison named to cabinet; required to run for reelection
Bonavista	Alfred B. Morine	Tory	October 2, 1894	A B Morine named to cabinet; required to run for reelection
Fogo	Thomas C. Duder	Tory	October 2, 1894	T C Duder named to cabinet; required to run for reelection
Trinity	William H. Horwood	Liberal	October 16, 1894	Results of 1893 election set aside
Trinity	George W. Gushue	Liberal	October 16, 1894	Results of 1893 election set aside
Trinity	George M. Johnson	Liberal	October 16, 1894	Results of 1893 election set aside
Twillingate	Giles Foote	Liberal	October 16, 1894	M T Knight named to cabinet; required to run for reelection
Burin	James J. Pitman	Liberal	November 10, 1894	Results of 1893 election set aside
Burin	Henry Gear	Liberal	November 10, 1894	Results of 1893 election set aside
Placentia and St. Mary's	Richard T. McGrath	Liberal	November 10, 1894	Results of 1893 election set aside
Placentia and St. Mary's	Michael Tobin	Liberal	November 10, 1894	Results of 1893 election set aside
Placentia and St. Mary's	John T. Dunphy	Liberal	November 10, 1894	WJS Donnelly named to cabinet; required to run for reelection
St. John's East	John P. Fox	Liberal	November 10, 1894	Results of 1893 election set aside
St. John's East	Charles Hutton	Liberal	November 10, 1894	Results of 1893 election set aside
St. John's West	Patrick J. Scott	Liberal	November 10, 1894	Results of 1893 election set aside
St. John's West	G. J. Tessier	Liberal	November 10, 1894	Results of 1893 election set aside
St. John's West	Thomas P. Jackman	Liberal	November 10, 1894	Results of 1893 election set aside
St. George's	Michael H. Carty	Liberal	November 12, 1894	Results of 1893 election set aside
Bay de Verde	Henry J. B. Woods	Liberal	February 27, 1895	S Woods resigned seat
Harbour Grace	William Whiteway	Liberal	February 27, 1895	R S Munn died December 17, 1894
Harbour Grace	Eli Dawe	Liberal	February 27, 1895	E Dawe named to cabinet; required to run for reelection
St. John's West	Patrick J. Scott	Liberal	February 27, 1895	P J Scott named to cabinet; required to run for reelection
St. John's West	Edward Patrick Morris	Liberal	February 27, 1895	G J Tessier resigned seat
Twillingate	Robert Bond	Liberal	September 16, 1895	JP Thompson resigned seat
