= 1893 Newfoundland general election =

Election in the Colony of Newfoundland

- November 6, 1893

36 seats of the Newfoundland House of Assembly 19 seats needed for a majority
- Turnout: 76.24%
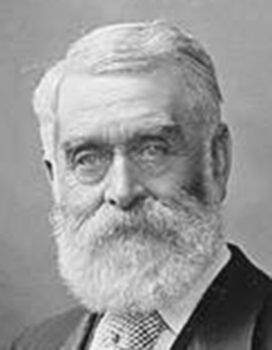

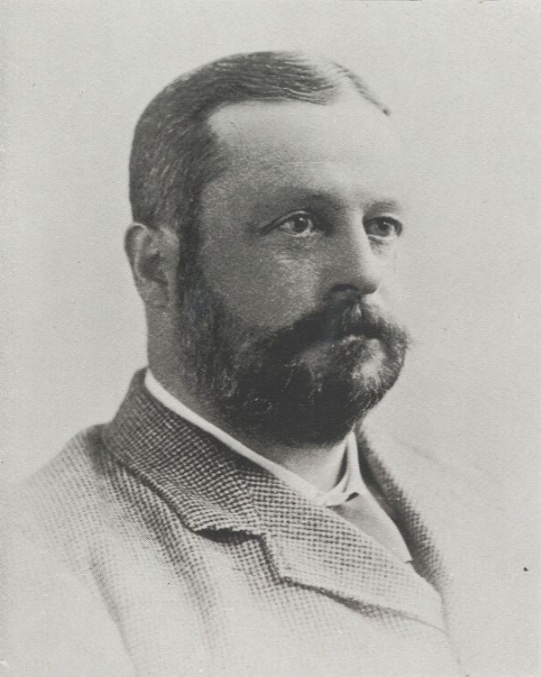

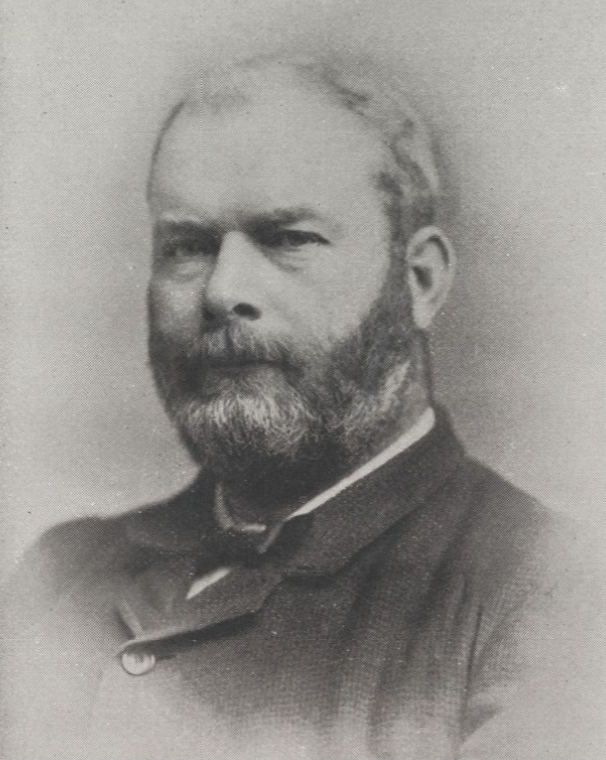
	First party	Second party
Leader	William Whiteway	Walter Grieve and Moses Monroe
Party	Liberal	Conservative
Leader since	1885	1893 / 1893
Leader's seat	Trinity Bay	Ran in Trinity Bay (lost) / Ran in St. John's West (lost)
Last election	28 seats, 60.86%	7 seats, 36.54% (Note: As the Reform Party)
Seats won	23	12
Seat change	▼5	▲5
Popular vote	39,516	35,546
Percentage	50.68%	45.59%
Swing	▼10.18%	▲9.05%
- Results by district
Premier before election
William Whiteway
Liberal
Premier after election
William Whiteway
Liberal

The 1893 Newfoundland general election was held on November 6, 1893 to elect members of the 17th General Assembly of Newfoundland in Newfoundland Colony. Although the Liberals won the majority of seats, the Conservative party filed petitions against 15 elected Liberals and one Independent, James Murray, alleging election irregularities. The results of those elections were set aside by the Supreme Court of Newfoundland and the candidates were barred from seeking reelection. The Conservative party, led by Augustus F. Goodridge, temporarily held the balance of power and formed a government in 1894. Once the resulting by-elections had been held, the Liberals regained the balance of power and formed a government led by Daniel Joseph Greene. Greene's government passed legislation allowing candidates who had been disqualified to seek election again. William Whiteway was reelected in a by-election in early 1895 and became Premier.

== Results ==
Party	Leader(s)	1889	Candidates	Seats won	Seat change	% of seats (% change)	Popular vote	% of vote (% change)
Liberal	William Whiteway	28	35	23	▼5	63.89% (▼13.89%)	39,516	50.68% (▼10.18%)
Conservative	Walter Grieve and Moses Monroe	5	35	7	▲5	33.33% (▲19.44%)	35,546	45.59% (▲9.05%)
Other		1	8	1	Steady	2.78%	2,906	3.72% (▲1.12%)
Totals		36	78	36	Steady	100%	77,968 (Note: This figure includes votes cast for more than one candidate in multi-member districts. A total of 46,385 individual votes were cast in this election.)	100%

== Results by district ==
- Names in **boldface type** represent party leaders.
- † indicates that the incumbent did not run again.
- ‡ indicates that the incumbent ran in a different district.

=== St. John's ===
Electoral district	Candidates			Incumbent
Electoral district	Liberal (historical)	Conservative (historical)	Other	Incumbent
St. John's East (Note: Following the election, the Conservatives successfully charged the victorious Liberal candidate(s) in this district with bribery and corruption through the Corrupt Practices Act. The member(s) were subsequently unseated and disqualified from running in the ensuing by-elections.); 80.16% turnout	James Fox; 2,134; 23.05%	Lawrence Furlong; 1,296; 14.00%	Jeremiah Halleran (Independent); 805; 8.69%	Thomas Murphy
St. John's East; 80.16% turnout	Thomas Murphy; 1,452; 15.68%	James Boggan; 1,229; 13.27%	Jeremiah Halleran (Independent); 805; 8.69%	Vacant (Note: John Dearin had been elected in 1889, but he died while in office on July 25, 1890.)
St. John's East; 80.16% turnout	James Ryan; 1,202; 12.98%	Maurice Fenelon; 1,142; 12.33%	Jeremiah Halleran (Independent); 805; 8.69%	Jeremiah Halleran
St. John's West; 88.00% turnout	Edward Morris; 2,097; 20.68%	**Moses Monroe**; 1,562; 15.41%		Edward Morris
St. John's West; 88.00% turnout	James Tessier; 1,962; 19.35%	Patrick Scott; 1,530; 15.09%		James Day†
St. John's West; 88.00% turnout	Martin W. Furlong; 1,730; 17.06%	James Callanan; 1,258; 12.41%		Lawrence Gearin†

=== Conception Bay ===
Electoral district	Candidates			Incumbent
Electoral district	Liberal (historical)	Conservative (historical)	Other	Incumbent
Bay de Verde; 79.69% turnout	Henry Woods; 1,077; 32.74%	Levi March; 637; 19.36%		Edward White‡ (ran in Trinity Bay)
Bay de Verde; 79.69% turnout	George Moores; 946; 28.75%	John Robinson; 630; 19.15%		Henry Woods
Carbonear; 60.45% turnout	William Duff; 471; 54.64%	Alfred Penney; 391; 45.36%		William Duff
Harbour Grace; 78.49% turnout	Eli Dawe; 888; 15.29%	Henry Dawe; 1,140; 19.63%	Alexander Squires(Independent); 303; 5.22%	William Whiteley†
Harbour Grace; 78.49% turnout	Daniel Green; 709; 12.21%	Robert Munn; 1,125; 19.37%	Alexander Parsons (Independent); 86; 1.48%	Eli Dawe
Harbour Grace; 78.49% turnout	Donald Browning; 685; 11.79%	William Ward; 872; 15.01%	Alexander Parsons (Independent); 86; 1.48%	Robert Munn
Harbour Main; 78.77% turnout	Frank Morris; 1,011; 37.05%	Richard MacDonnell; 449; 16.45%	William Holden (Independent); 138; 5.06%	Frank Morris
Harbour Main; 78.77% turnout	William Woodford; 873; 31.99%	Michael Gibbs; 258; 9.45%	William Holden (Independent); 138; 5.06%	William Woodford
Port de Grave; 73.43% turnout	James Clift; 461; 32.83%	Charles Dawe; 501; 35.68%	Harry Bartlett (Independent); 442; 31.48%	James Clift

=== Avalon Peninsula ===
Electoral district	Candidates		Incumbent
Electoral district	Liberal (historical)	Conservative (historical)	Incumbent
Ferryland; 81.53% turnout	Michael Cashin; 870; 44.78%	George Shea; 501; 25.78%	George Shea
Ferryland; 81.53% turnout	Daniel Greene; 572; 29.44%	George Shea; 501; 25.78%	Daniel Greene
Placentia and St. Mary's; 77.96% turnout	James McGrath; 1,244; 18.27%	William Donnelly; 1,200; 17.62%	George Emerson
Placentia and St. Mary's; 77.96% turnout	George Emerson; 1,211; 17.79%	W. N. Siteman; 1,068; 15.69%	Richard O'Dwyer
Placentia and St. Mary's; 77.96% turnout	Richard O'Dwyer; 1,036; 15.22%	John Foran; 1,050; 15.42%	James McGrath

=== Eastern Newfoundland ===
Electoral district	Candidates		Incumbent
Electoral district	Liberal (historical)	Conservative (historical)	Incumbent
Bonavista Bay; 76.89% turnout	Robert Thorburn; 1,139; 11.45%	Donald Morison; 2,295; 23.07%	Donald Morison
Bonavista Bay; 76.89% turnout	George Johnson; 1,104; 11.10%	Alfred Morine; 2,248; 22.60%	Samuel Blandford†
Bonavista Bay; 76.89% turnout	W. Davis; 1,029; 10.34%	Darius Blandford; 2,134; 21.45%	Alfred Morine
Trinity Bay (Note: Following the election, the Conservatives successfully charged the victorious Liberal candidates in this district with bribery and corruption through the Corrupt Practices Act, and they were subsequently unseated. However, unlike the rest of those convicted, Watson was not disqualified from running in the ensuing by-elections. Despite this, Watson chose not to return to politics, and he was instead appointed as a customs inspector in St. John's.); 80.18% turnout	**William Whiteway**; 2,086; 21.61%	**Walter Grieve**; 1,476; 15.29%	**William Whiteway**
Trinity Bay; 80.18% turnout	Robert Bond; 1,938; 20.07%	Robert Bremner; 1,413; 14.64%	Robert Bond
Trinity Bay; 80.18% turnout	James Watson; 1,639; 16.98%	Edward White; 1,102; 11.41%	Vacant (Note: David Webber had been elected in 1889, but he died while in office on August 22, 1893.)

=== Central Newfoundland ===
Electoral district	Candidates			Incumbent
Electoral district	Liberal (historical)	Conservative (historical)	Other	Incumbent
Fogo; 64.44% turnout	George Skelton; 412; 39.46%	Thomas Duder; 632; 60.54%		James Rolls†
Twillingate; 67.24% turnout	Jabez Thompson; 1,482; 19.71%	Augustus Goodridge; 1,350; 17.95%	Joshua Tavener (Independent); 457; 6.08%	Edward Burgess†
Twillingate; 67.24% turnout	Giles Foote; 1,248; 16.60%	Michael Knight; 1,251; 16.64%	G. G. Williams (Independent); 68; 0.90%	Jabez Thompson
Twillingate; 67.24% turnout	Kenneth MacKenzie; 1,014; 13.49%	George Langmead; 649; 8.63%	G. G. Williams (Independent); 68; 0.90%	Thomas Peyton†

=== Southern and Western Newfoundland ===
Electoral district	Candidates			Incumbent
Electoral district	Liberal (historical)	Conservative (historical)	Other	Incumbent
Burgeo and LaPoile (Note: Following the election, the Conservatives successfully charged Murray with bribery and corruption through the Corrupt Practices Act. He was subsequently unseated and disqualified from running in the ensuing by-elections.); 72.65% turnout		Henry Mott; 466; 43.43%	James Murray (Independent); 607; 56.57%	James Murray
Burin; 76.39% turnout	James Tait; 983; 33.25%	Henry LeMessurier; 522; 17.66%		Vacant (Note: James Winter had been elected in 1889, but he had been appointed to the Supreme Court in 1893.)
Burin; 76.39% turnout	William Payne; 960; 32.48%	Herbert Knight; 491; 16.61%		James Tait
Fortune Bay; 69.57% turnout	James Pitman; 655; 48.84%	James Fraser Jr. 686; 51.16%		John Studdy†
St. Barbe; 63.35% turnout	Alexander Parsons; 528; 57.96%	F. Moores; 383; 42.04%		George Fearn†
St. George's; 78.83% turnout	James Keating; 668; 52.31%	Michael Carty; 609; 47.69%		Michael Carty
