= James M. Kent =

Newfoundland politician (1872–1939)

The Honourable James M. Kent MHA
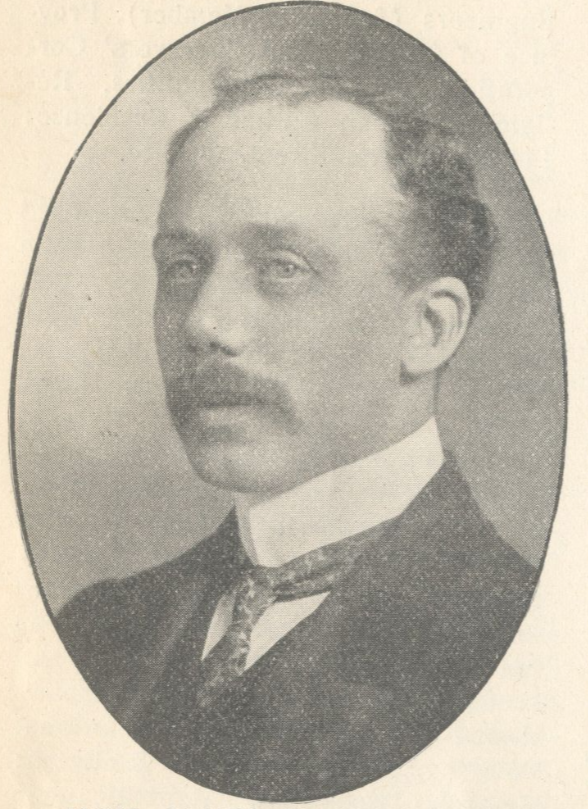
- Kent in 1927

Minister of Justice and Attorney General
- In office 1907–1909
- Prime Minister: Robert Bond
- Preceded by: Edward Morris
- Succeeded by: Donald Morison

Leader of the Liberal Party of Newfoundland
- In office 1914–1916
- Preceded by: Robert Bond
- Succeeded by: William F. Lloyd

Member of the Newfoundland House of Assembly for St. John's East
- In office October 31, 1904 – 1916 Serving with John Dwyer (1904–1916); George Shea (1904–1913); William J. Higgins (1913–1916)
- Preceded by: Lawrence O. Furlong; Thomas J. Murphy
- Succeeded by: Cyril J. Fox; Nicholas Vinnicombe

Personal details
- Born: May 31, 1872 St. John's, Newfoundland Colony
- Died: June 23, 1939 (aged 67) St. John's, Newfoundland
- Party: Liberal
- Spouse: Annie M. Walsh (m. 1905)
- Relatives: Robert J. Kent (father); John Kent (greatuncle)
- Education: Clongowes Wood College; Royal University of Ireland
- Occupation: Lawyer

James Mary Kent (May 31, 1872 – June 23, 1939) was a lawyer, judge and politician in Newfoundland. He represented St. John's East in the Newfoundland House of Assembly from 1904 to 1909 and from 1913 to 1916 as a Liberal.

== Early life and legal career ==
The son of Robert John Kent and Ellen Donnelly, he was born in St. John's and was educated at St. Patrick's Hall, Clongowes Wood College and the Royal University of Ireland. Kent married Annie Walsh. He studied law with his father and Joseph Ignatius Little and was admitted to the Newfoundland bar around 1893. He practised in partnership with his brother John and then with Martin W. Furlong.

== Politics ==
Kent served in the Newfoundland cabinet as Minister of Justice and Attorney General. He was defeated when he ran for reelection in 1909. He returned to the practice of law in partnership with Richard T. McGrath. Kent also represented Newfoundland in a fisheries dispute with the United States in 1909. He became Liberal party leader in 1914 after Robert Bond retired. In 1916, he was named to the Supreme Court of Newfoundland. He served as head of the Civil Re-establishment Committee at the end of World War I. He was also vice-president of the Benevolent Irish Society and a charter member of the Knights of Columbus
