= John Dwyer (Newfoundland politician) =

Newfoundland farmer and politician (1839–1917)

John Dwyer MHA
- Dwyer c. 1907

Member of the Newfoundland House of Assembly for St. John's East
- In office November 9, 1899 – January 23, 1917 Serving with Lawrence Furlong (1899–1904); Thomas J. Murphy (1899–1904); James M. Kent (1904–1916); George Shea (1904–1913); William J. Higgins (1913–1917)
- Preceded by: James P. Fox
- Succeeded by: Cyril J. Fox; Nicholas Vinnicombe

Personal details
- Born: 1839 St. John's, Newfoundland Colony
- Died: January 23, 1917 (aged 77–78) St. John's, Newfoundland
- Party: Liberal
- Occupation: Farmer

John Dwyer (1839 – January 23, 1917) was a Newfoundland farmer and politician. Dwyer was the owner and operator of Oak Farm in St. John's. As a Liberal supporting Robert Bond and James M. Kent, he served as a member of the Newfoundland House of Assembly (MHA) for St. John's East from 1899 to 1917.

== Biography ==
Dwyer was born in St. John's, Newfoundland to John Dwyer, an Irish immigrant, and Bridget Dwyer (née Tobin). The older John had established Oak Farm in the outskirts of St. John's where the Dwyer family was raised. Following his father's death, the younger John took over farming operations, and he managed a prosperous farm in a colony with little arable farmland. The large property occasionally served as a meeting place for St. John's residents. Notably, it hosted the inaugural meeting of Newfoundland Railway workers on August 16, 1881. Dwyer was also a lifelong member of the Benevolent Irish Society.

Dwyer entered electoral politics when he successfully contested an 1899 by-election in St. John's East to succeed the recently deceased MHA James P. Fox. A leading advocate for the agricultural development of Newfoundland, Dwyer was appointed to the Agricultural Board by premier Robert Bond. Dwyer served in the House of Assembly for the remainder of his life. He died at Oak Farm on January 23, 1917.
