= Cyril J. Fox =

Newfoundland politician (1889–1946)

The Honourable Cyril J. Fox KC
- Fox in 1927

Chairman of the Newfoundland National Convention
- In office September 11, 1946 – November 16, 1946
- Preceded by: Position established
- Succeeded by: F. Gordon Bradley

24th Speaker of the Newfoundland House of Assembly
- In office 1924–1928
- Preceded by: Harry A. Winter
- Succeeded by: Albert Walsh

Member of the Newfoundland House of Assembly for St. John's East
- In office November 3, 1919 – October 29, 1928 Serving with William J. Higgins and Nicholas Vinnicombe
- Preceded by: John Dwyer; James M. Kent
- Succeeded by: Frederick C. Alderdice; William E. Brophy (as MHAs for St. John's City East)

Personal details
- Born: Cyril James Fox; May 24, 1889 St. John's, Newfoundland Colony
- Died: November 16, 1946 (aged 57) St. John's, Newfoundland
- Party: Liberal-Progressive (1919–1928); Liberal-Labour-Progressive (1923–1924); Liberal-Conservative Progressive (1924–1928)
- Spouse: Mary Cashin (m. 1921)
- Children: 3 daughters
- Relatives: Michael Cashin (father-in-law); Peter Cashin (brother-in-law)
- Education: Saint Bonaventure's College
- Occupation: Lawyer

Cyril James Fox (May 24, 1889 – November 16, 1946) was a lawyer, judge and political figure in Newfoundland. He represented St. John's East in the Newfoundland and Labrador House of Assembly from 1919 to 1928.

== Early life and legal career ==
Fox was born on May 24, 1889 in St. John's to John F. Fox and Minnie Fox (née Vinnicombe). After graduating from Saint Bonaventure's College, he studied law with William Warren and was called to the Newfoundland bar in 1916. Fox married Mary Cashin, the daughter of former prime minister Michael Cashin, on August 30, 1921. They had three daughters.

== Politics ==
Fox served as speaker for the Newfoundland assembly from 1924 to 1928. He retired from politics and returned to his law practice in 1928, and he was named a King's Counsel in the same year. In 1944, Fox was named a justice in the Newfoundland Supreme Court. Fox served as the first chairman for the Newfoundland National Convention but died suddenly before the end of the convention.
