= William J. Higgins =

Newfoundland lawyer and politician (1880–1943)

The Honourable William J. Higgins KC
- Higgins in 1927

Minister of Justice and Attorney General
- In office 1924–1928
- Prime Minister: Walter S. Monroe; Frederick C. Alderdice
- Preceded by: William Warren
- Succeeded by: Richard Squires

Colonial Secretary
- In office May 3, 1924 – May 7, 1924
- Prime Minister: William Warren
- Preceded by: William Halfyard
- Succeeded by: William Halfyard

21st Speaker of the Newfoundland House of Assembly
- In office 1918–1920
- Preceded by: John R. Goodison
- Succeeded by: William F. Penney

Member of the Newfoundland House of Assembly for St. John's East
- In office October 30, 1913 – October 29, 1928 Serving with John Dwyer (1913–1917); James M. Kent (1913–1916); Cyril J. Fox (1919–1928); Nicholas Vinnicombe (1919–1925); William E. Brophy (1925–1928)
- Preceded by: George Shea
- Succeeded by: Frederick C. Alderdice; Gerald G. Byrne

Personal details
- Born: September 4, 1880 St. John's, Newfoundland Colony
- Died: October 7, 1943 (aged 63) St. John's, Newfoundland
- Party: People's (1913–1919); Liberal-Progressive (1919–1923); Liberal-Labour-Progressive (1923–1924); Liberal-Conservative Progressive (1924–1928)
- Spouse: Mary P. McGirr (m. 1905)
- Children: 5, including Gordon and James
- Occupation: Lawyer

William John Higgins (September 4, 1880 – October 7, 1943) was a lawyer, judge and political figure in Newfoundland. He represented St. John's East in the House of Assembly from 1913 to 1928 as a member of the Newfoundland People's Party, Liberal Progressive party, Liberal-Labour-Progressive party and the Liberal-Conservative Progressive Party.

He was born in St. John's and was educated there. He worked as a clerk for a time. Higgins was called to the Newfoundland bar in 1910. He excelled in sports: he rowed in the Royal St. John's Regatta from 1901 to 1908, was the Newfoundland champion in the mile run for two years, was president of a number of sports leagues and president of the Newfoundland Amateur Athletic Association.

Higgins served as speaker for the Newfoundland assembly from 1918 to 1919. He was leader of the Liberal-Labour-Progressive Party from 1923 to 1924. He served in the Newfoundland Executive Council as Minister of Justice and Attorney General. After he retired from politics in 1928, he was named a judge in the Newfoundland Supreme Court. His son James served in the House of Assembly after Confederation, and his son Gordon served in the Canadian House of Commons.
