= Attorney General Kent =

Attorney General Kent may refer to:

- James M. Kent (1872–1939), Attorney General of Newfoundland
- Benjamin Kent (1708–1788), Attorney General of Massachusetts
