= Jeremiah Halleran =

Newfoundland politician (1843–1925)

Jeremiah Halleran MHA
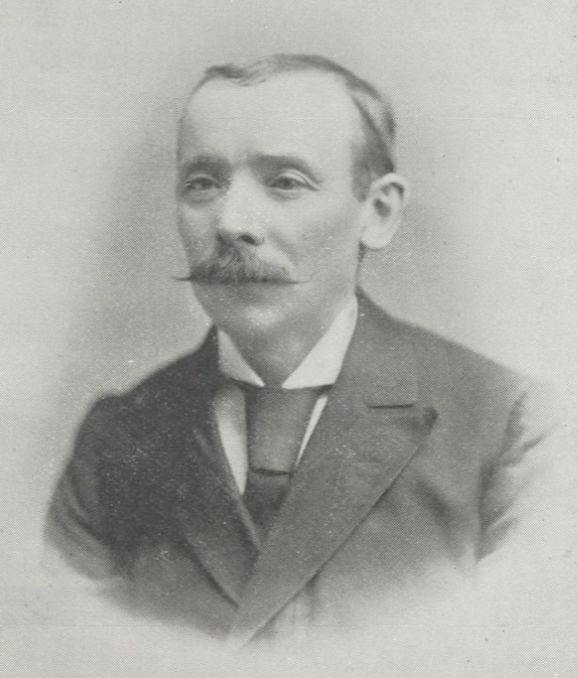
- Halleran in 1894

Member of the Newfoundland House of Assembly for St. John's East
- In office November 6, 1889 – November 6, 1893 Serving with John J. Dearin (1889–1890); Thomas J. Murphy (1889–1893)
- Preceded by: Michael J. O'Mara; Robert Parsons Jr.
- Succeeded by: James P. Fox; Lawrence Furlong

Personal details
- Born: March 18, 1843 Halifax, Nova Scotia
- Died: January 3, 1925 (aged 81) Saint John, New Brunswick, Canada
- Party: Liberal (1889–1893); Independent (1893)
- Spouse: Margaret F. Cleary (m. 1865–1894)
- Occupation: Merchant

Jeremiah Halleran (March 18, 1843 – January 3, 1925) was a Newfoundland merchant and politician. As a Liberal supporter of Premier William Whiteway, he represented St. John's East in the Newfoundland House of Assembly from 1889 to 1893.

== Business career ==
Halleran was born on March 18, 1843 in Halifax, Nova Scotia and was educated at St. Mary's College there. He came to Newfoundland as a young child but returned to Nova Scotia to attend school. He trained to be a carpenter and joiner. Halleran worked in Little Glace Bay, Cape Breton Island, Portland, Maine, Boston and later Brooklyn, where he operated his own business. In 1875, he moved to Newfoundland and established a construction business. In 1879, in partnership with H.G. Herder, he set up a factory which manufactured wood products; the business also was involved in construction work. The factory was destroyed in the Great Fire of 1892.

== Politics ==
Halleran was elected as a Liberal in 1889 but then ran unsuccessfully for reelection as an independent candidate in 1893. He was a member of the St. John's Mechanics' Society and was president from 1891 to 1894. Soon afterwards, he left Newfoundland and died in Saint John, New Brunswick in 1925.
