= James Fox (Newfoundland politician) =

Canadian politician

James Fox (c. 1817 – September 23, 1883) was a merchant and political figure in Newfoundland. He was a member of the Legislative Council of Newfoundland from 1879 to 1883.

He was born in Harbour Grace and operated a fishing supply business in St. John's with his brother John. Fox died in St. John's in 1883.

He was the father of James Patrick Fox who later served in the Newfoundland assembly.
