= Moses Monroe =

Newfoundland businessman and politician (1842–1895)

The Honourable Moses Monroe MLC
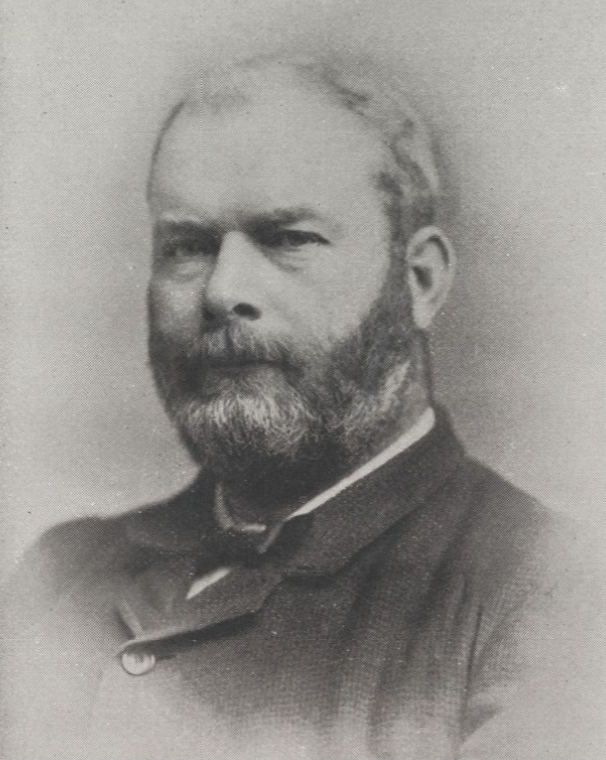
- Monroe in 1894

Member of the Legislative Council of Newfoundland
- In office August 2, 1894 – May 19, 1895
- Appointed by: Augustus F. Goodridge
- In office February 19, 1884 – June 16, 1893
- Appointed by: William Whiteway

St. John's City Councillor for Ward 3
- In office August 30, 1888 – January 23, 1892
- Succeeded by: James Goodfellow

Personal details
- Born: 1842 Moira, County Down, Ireland
- Died: May 19, 1895 (aged 52–53) St. John's, Newfoundland Colony
- Party: Conservative
- Spouse: Jessie Gordon McMurdo (m. 1871)
- Relatives: John Monroe (brother); Hugh Holmes (brother-in-law); Moses Harvey (uncle); Walter S. Monroe (nephew); Frederick C. Alderdice (nephew)
- Occupation: Businessman

Moses Monroe (1842 – May 19, 1895) was an Irish-born businessman and politician in Newfoundland. He was an inaugural member of the first St. John's City Council, and he served on the Legislative Council, the colony's upper house, from 1884 to 1893 and 1894 until his death.

A dry goods merchant with interests in the twine and rope industry, he was the main founder of the Colonial Cordage Company. Monroe initially supported Premier William Whiteway before standing in opposition over the French Shore issue and the terms of the Newfoundland Railway contract. He unsuccessfully led the Conservative Party in the 1893 election alongside Walter B. Grieve.

== Early life and business career ==
Aerial view of the Colonial Cordage Company (known as "Ropewalk Lane") near Mundy Pond, St. John's, 1940's

Monroe was born in the town of Moira, County Down, Ireland as the son of John Monroe and Jane Monroe (née Harvey). Growing up in a wealthy family of Scottish and Irish descent, he was educated at the local schools in Armagh and Galway before finding work with a clothing manufacturer in County Down. In 1860, he emigrated to St. John's, Newfoundland upon the encouragement of his maternal uncle Moses Harvey, who was then the Presbyterian minister there, where he worked as a clerk for the dry goods firm McBride and Kerr. In 1869, the firm's manager James Goodfellow incorporated it into his own business, James Goodfellow & Co., and brought Monroe on as a business partner the following year. Monroe married Jessie McMurdo in 1871, who was the daughter of pharmacy owner Thomas McMurdo. The couple had no children.

Monroe started his own dry goods enterprise after Goodfellow dissolved their partnership on December 31, 1872, claiming that Monroe had been falsifying the prices of the firm's goods with the intent of harming Goodfellow. His reputation unscathed, Monroe's business, likely funded with his father-in-law's capital, became prominent suppliers for the cod fishermen in Labrador and the Grand Banks.

In the early 1880s, Monroe collaborated with James J. Rogerson and Ambrose Shea to start the Colonial Cordage Company, which would produce local twine and nets for fishermen rather than having them imported from foreign firms. After the English firm Joseph Grundy & Co. had turned down an offer, Monroe's brother James H. Monroe joined him as co-manager. Benefiting from an 8% tax on imported cables instituted by Premier William Whiteway, the Colonial Cordage Company, also known as "the Ropewalk," quickly saw success, and it became the largest wage labour business in St. John's with over 180 employees. Monroe was also a prominent shareholder for many local businesses, including the St. John's Electric Light Company, and was instrumental in the establishment of the Atlantic Hotel in 1885.

== Early political career (1884–1889) ==
As an implicit acknowledgement of Monroe's standing in the St. John's business community, Premier Whiteway appointed him to the Legislative Council on February 19, 1884. In the upper house, Monroe supported Whiteway's railway policy, but also took independent positions in supporting a non-denominational education system and opposing the prohibition of alcohol. He remained a Whiteway supporter when the administration collapsed due to the fallout from the Harbour Grace Affray, and he unsuccessfully attempted to negotiate a coalition between Whiteway's supporters and the opposition parties. Although the succeeding Robert Thorburn administration maintained Whiteway's cable tariff, Monroe was broadly critical of the Thorburn government when it built a branch line to Placentia after campaigning against Whiteway's railway policy.

When Monroe was elected to the first St. John's City Council in 1888, he began to break with Whiteway and his supporters over the city's electricity contract, where he played a particularly influential role as the secretary of the St. John's Electric Light Company. He competed with Edward Morris, the Whiteway-supporting member of the Newfoundland House of Assembly (MHA) for St. John's West, for political influence in the west end of the city.

== Leader of the opposition (1890–1894) ==
Monroe became a firm opponent of Premier Whiteway in 1890 when, alongside newspaper editor Alfred B. Morine, he stoked public protest against the Whiteway government's modus vivendi with the British imperial government, which would have allowed them to prohibit the establishment of lobster factories on the French Shore in return for financial assistance with the developing railway. The administration was pressured to negotiate, and Monroe and Morine represented the opposition in an cross-party Newfoundland delegation to the House of Lords in London recommending that the colonial government be given permission to enforce French fishing rights. When the final legislation failed to eschew imperial enforcement, Monroe successfully persuaded the legislature to turn it down, and much of Whiteway's own party voted against its passage. In his role as a municipal councillor, Monroe was also active in the formation of the Tenants' League agitating for the establishment of a land court following the Great Fire of 1892.

In the face of the upcoming general election, Monroe resigned from the Legislative Council, and the Conservative opposition to Whiteway announced on June 16, 1893, the formation of a new party jointly led by Monroe and fellow businessman Walter B. Grieve. The party attacked the Whiteway government for failing to protect Newfoundland interests in the French Shore and for the generous contract they had signed with railway contractor Robert Gillespie Reid. In turn, Whiteway's Liberal party derided him as "Monopolist Monroe" and charged that he had embezzled funds from the fire relief program. Historian D. W. Prowse noted that Monroe had campaigned with great vigour for the House of Assembly seat representing St. John's West against incumbent MHA Morris. Despite these efforts, however, the Grieve–Monroe Conservative party were soundly defeated by the incumbent Whiteway administration. P. K. Devine later noted that Monroe's friends believed that his loss to Morris "was the great disappointment of his life."

The Conservative opposition would soon charge much of the Liberal caucus with bribery and the illegal use of public funds under the Corrupt Practices Act, and the unseating of much of Whiteway's administration led to the rise of a tenuous Conservative government under Augustus F. Goodridge, who reappointed Monroe to the Legislative Council. He contested the subsequent by-election in the district of Trinity for October 16, 1894, but narrowly lost to the Liberal ticket. Monroe's businesses were greatly impacted less than two months later in the 1894 Newfoundland bank crash, and after unsuccessfully endorsing the establishment of a Bank of Nova Scotia branch in St. John's, sold most of his financial resources in an effort to pay his debts.

In poor health thereafter, Monroe went on holiday to England and his home country of Ireland, and although his health had briefly improved, he died suddenly of a stroke while in St. John's on May 19, 1895. A memorial in his name had been erected in Victoria Park. Two of his nephews, Walter Stanley Monroe and Frederick C. Alderdice, would go on to serve as Prime Ministers of Newfoundland.
