= Charles Edmund Fox =

British legal figure

Sir Charles Edmund Fox, KCSI (18 Feb. 1854–9 Oct. 1918) was a British barrister and judge in British Burma. He was Chief Judge of the Chief Court of Lower Burma from 1906 to 1917.

The son of John Fox of St John's, Newfoundland, Charles Edmund Fox was educated at Prior Park College, Bath. He was called to the English bar in 1877, was Government Advocate, Burma from 1884 to 1900, Judge of the Chief Court of Lower Burma from April 1900 and Chief Judge of the Chief Court of Lower Burma from 1906 to 1917. In retirement he settled in Gloucester.

Fox married in 1877 Ethel Mary Hobhouse, eldest daughter of Sir Charles Parry Hobhouse, 3rd Baronet (see Hobhouse baronets).
