= Martin W. Furlong =

Newfoundland politician (1864–1916)

Martin W. Furlong KC
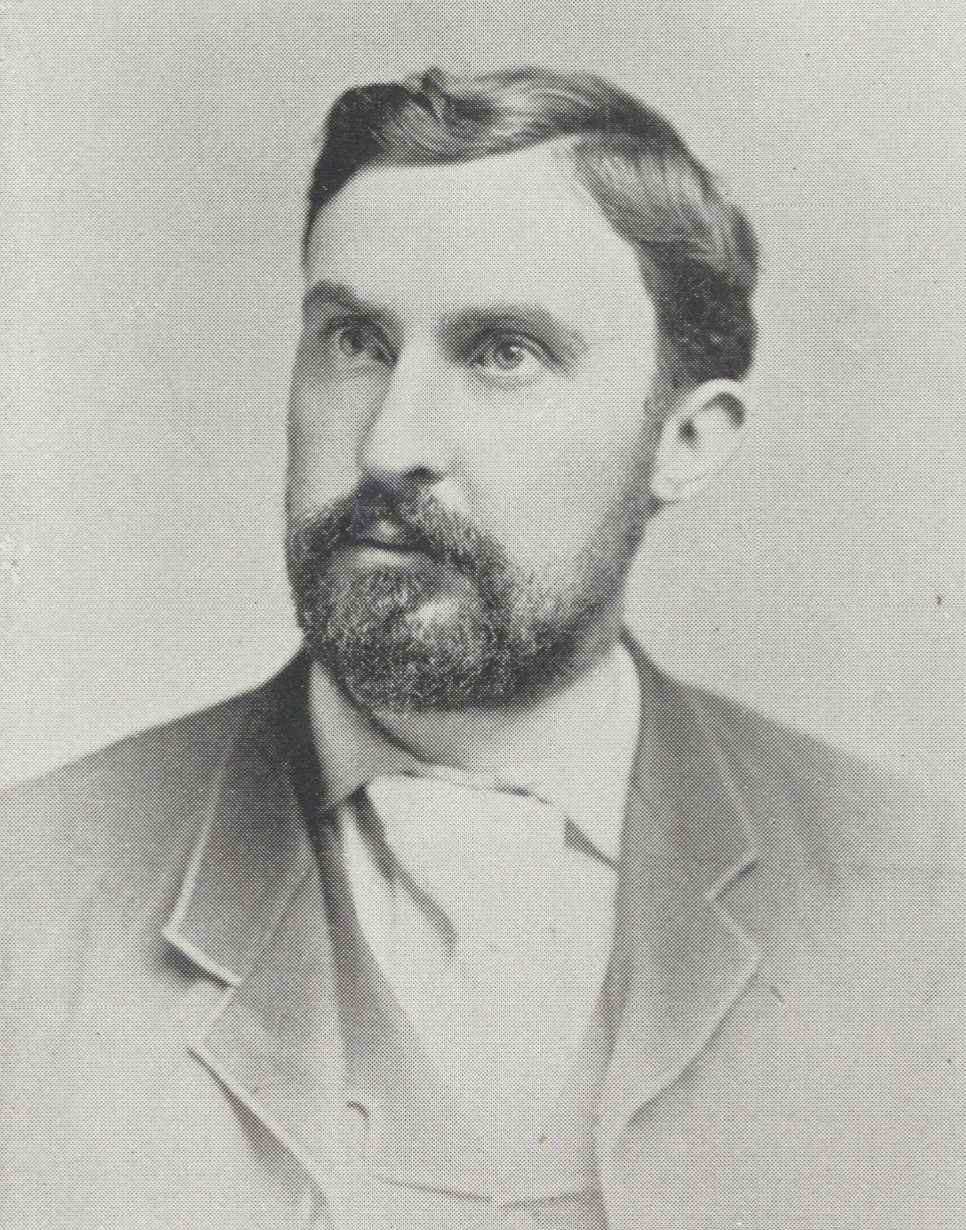
- Furlong in 1894

Member of the Newfoundland House of Assembly for St. John's West
- In office November 6, 1893 – November 10, 1894 Serving with Edward Morris and James C. Tessier
- Preceded by: James Day; Lawrence Gearin
- Succeeded by: Thomas P. Jackman; Patrick J. Scott; George Tessier

Personal details
- Born: March 29, 1864 Oderin, Newfoundland Colony
- Died: February 9, 1916 (aged 51) Montreal, Quebec, Canada
- Party: Liberal
- Spouse: Minnie McGrath (m. 1898)
- Education: Saint Bonaventure's College; University of London
- Occupation: Teacher, lawyer

Martin Williams Furlong (March 29, 1864 – February 9, 1916) was a Newfoundland lawyer and politician. Originally from the outport community of Oderin in Placentia Bay, Furlong was a school teacher and lawyer before entering politics. As a Liberal supporter of Premier William Whiteway, he briefly served in the Newfoundland House of Assembly as one of the members for St. John's East from 1893 until 1894, when he was disqualified through the Corrupt Practices Act. Furlong was among the lawyers who prepared Newfoundland's successful case against Quebec regarding the Labrador-Quebec border.

== Early legal career ==
Furlong was born on March 29, 1864 in Oderin, Placentia Bay. He attended Saint Bonaventure's College in St. John's before matriculating at the London University. After graduating in 1881, he returned to St. John's and taught at Saint Bonaventure's for three years. In 1884, he turned to law, studying under Robert John Kent. Furlong became a solicitor to the Supreme Court in 1888, and he was called to the Newfoundland bar on May 29, 1890. By this time, however, Furlong had turned his attention to politics.

== Politics ==
Furlong first attempted to enter the House of Assembly when he ran as the Liberal candidate supporting William Whiteway for the district of Ferryland in the 1889 Newfoundland general election, where he was defeated by incumbent MHAs and veteran politicians Daniel Greene and George Shea. As Whiteway handily won that election, Furlong was appointed as the Solicitor of the House of Assembly later that year. He ran again for political office in 1893 and won a seat for the district of St. John's East. His colleague Henry Y. Mott remarked that he was an exceptional debater as one of the principal members of the Academia Club.

The Conservative opposition filed fifteen petitions in January 1894 alleging that much of the Liberal caucus, including Furlong, had violated the Corrupt Practices Act by offering government work to voters in exchange for their support. Dominated by former Conservative politicians like Chief Justice Frederick Carter and Justice James S. Winter, all of the charged members were found guilty, and Furlong was consequently evicted from his seat and disqualified from running again. He was subsequently appointed as the Chief Clerk of the House of Assembly later that year. The Corrupt Practices Act would eventually be repealed, and Furlong ran again as the Liberal candidate for Ferryland in 1897, but he was again defeated.

== Later legal career ==
Furlong resumed his work as a lawyer in 1900 when he was appointed as the Legislative Law Clerk, and he was the senior government counsel for the Robert Bond administration as they renegotiated the contract for the Newfoundland Railway with Robert G. Reid. His familiarity with the Reid Newfoundland Company led to his becoming a solicitor for them in 1907, and he become one of the company's directors in 1911. He was a senior partner in the law firm of Furlong, Conroy, and Higgins.

Furlong was one of the lawyers who drafted the Dominion of Newfoundland's case regarding the dispute with the Canadian province of Quebec over their border with Labrador. He died while in Montreal on February 9, 1916. The Privy Council eventually decided in favour of Newfoundland's claim in 1927.
