= Charles Hutton (politician) =

Newfoundland politician (1861–1949)

Sir Charles Hutton KSG OBE
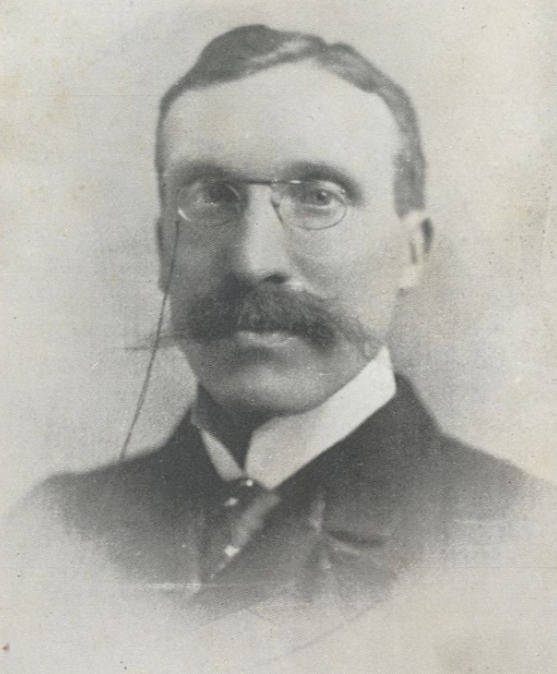
- Hutton in 1894

Member of the Newfoundland House of Assembly for St. John's East
- In office November 10, 1894 – October 28, 1897 Serving with John P. Fox and Lawrence O. Furlong
- Preceded by: James P. Fox; Thomas J. Murphy
- Succeeded by: Thomas J. Murphy

Personal details
- Born: August 20, 1861 St. John's, Newfoundland Colony
- Died: February 1, 1949 (aged 87) St. John's, Newfoundland
- Party: Liberal
- Spouse: Antonia D'Alberti (m. 1903)
- Children: 4
- Education: Saint Bonaventure's College; Saint Dunstan's College
- Occupation: Organist, businessman

Sir Charles Warrington Hutton (August 20, 1861 – February 1, 1949) was a musician, educator, business owner and politician in Newfoundland. He represented St. John's East in the Newfoundland House of Assembly from 1894 to 1897 as a Liberal.

The son of George and Eliza Hutton, he was born in St. John's and was educated at Saint Bonaventure's College, at St. Dunstan's College and at the French college at St. Pierre. He later studied music in England for three years around 1900.

Hutton began work as a bookkeeper for Hearn & Company in 1879 and then, in 1883, opened a musical supply business. Until 1894, he ran the business out of his home. In 1880, he became organist and choirmaster for the Roman Catholic cathedral in St. John's. He taught music at Saint Bonaventure's, St. Patrick's Hall and Holy Cross School in St. John's. Hutton also was director for concerts performed by boys from the Mount Cashel Orphanage. He was also co-founder and conductor for the St. John's Choral and Orchestral Society.

Hutton published the Newfoundland Folio of Over Fifty Old Favourite Songs in 1906.

His student and protégé Ignatius Rumboldt became a prominent musician in St. John's.

Hutton was elected to the Newfoundland assembly in an 1894 by-election.

In 1903, he married Antonia "Tony" D'Alberti. The couple had four children.

He was named a knight in the Order of St. Gregory the Great in 1924 and was named to the Order of the British Empire in 1938.

Hutton died in St. John's at the age of 87.
