= Walter M. Chambers =

Canadian politician

Walter McKenzie Chambers (January 23, 1873 – 1934) was a merchant and politician in Newfoundland. He represented Burgeo-La Poile in the Newfoundland House of Assembly from 1924 to 1928.

The son of Charles Duncan Chambers, he was born in Harbour Buffett and was educated there and in Bay Roberts. Chambers began work in the family business in 1887 and took over its operation in 1898. He was named a justice of the peace and customs officer in 1906. In 1920, Chambers sold his business and moved to St. John's. He was an unsuccessful candidate for a seat in the Newfoundland assembly in 1923 but was elected in the general election held the following year. In 1926, he was named to the cabinet as Minister of Public Works. He was reelected in 1928 but resigned for health reasons. Chambers later operated a hotel in Spaniard's Bay and was a director for the Church of England Colleges.

In 1898, he married Hannah Peach.
