= St. John's East (provincial electoral district) =

Former provincial electoral district in Newfoundland and Labrador, Canada

Newfoundland and Labrador electoral district
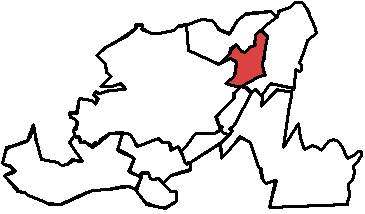
- St. John's East in relation to other districts in St. John's

Defunct provincial electoral district
- Legislature: Newfoundland and Labrador House of Assembly
- District created: 1949
- First contested: 1949
- Last contested: 2011

Demographics
- Population (2006): 11,739
- Electors (2011): 8,063

St. John's East was a provincial electoral district for the House of Assembly of Newfoundland and Labrador, Canada. In 2011 there were 8,063 eligible voters living within the district. The district was abolished in 2015 as Newfoundland and Labrador reduced the number of districts. Portions of the district are now within the district of St. John's East-Quidi Vidi.

Prior to 1956, the district was larger and elected two MHAs.

== Members of the House of Assembly ==
The district has elected the following members of the House of Assembly:

=== Triple-Member District (1832–1928) ===
Legislature	Years	Member	Party	Member	Party	Member	Party
St. John's
1st	1832–1833	John Kent	Liberal	Patrick Kough	Conservative	William Thomas	Conservative
1st	1833–1836	John Kent	Liberal	Patrick Kough	Conservative	William Carson	Liberal
2nd	1836–1840	John Kent	Liberal	Patrick Morris	Liberal	William Carson	Liberal
2nd	1840–1842	John Kent	Liberal	Laurence O'Brien	Liberal	William Carson	Liberal
3rd	1842–1843	John V. Nugent	Liberal	Laurence O'Brien	Liberal	William Carson	Liberal
3rd	1843–1848	John V. Nugent	Liberal	Laurence O'Brien	Liberal	Robert John Parsons Sr.	Liberal
4th	1848–1850	John Kent	Liberal	Laurence O'Brien	Liberal	Robert John Parsons Sr.	Liberal
4th	1850–1852	John Kent	Liberal	Philip Francis Little	Liberal	Robert John Parsons Sr.	Liberal
5th	1852–1855	John Kent	Liberal	Philip Francis Little	Liberal	Robert John Parsons Sr.	Liberal
St. John's East
6th	1855–1857	John Kent	Liberal	Robert John Parsons Sr.	Liberal	Peter Winser	Liberal
6th	1857–1859	John Kent	Liberal	Robert John Parsons Sr.	Liberal	John Kavanagh	Liberal
7th	1859–1861	John Kent	Liberal	Robert John Parsons Sr.	Liberal	John Kavanagh	Liberal
8th	1861–1865	John Kent	Liberal	Robert John Parsons Sr.	Liberal	John Kavanagh	Liberal
9th	1865–1869	John Kent	Conservative	Robert John Parsons Sr.	Liberal	John Kavanagh	Liberal
10th	1869–1873	William P. Walsh	Anti-Confederation	Robert John Parsons Sr.	Anti-Confederation	James Jordan	Anti-Confederation
11th	1873–1874	John Joseph Dearin	Anti-Confederation	Robert John Parsons Sr.	Anti-Confederation	Robert John Kent	Anti-Confederation
12th	1874–1878	John Joseph Dearin	Anti-Confederation	Robert John Parsons Sr.	Anti-Confederation	Robert John Kent	Anti-Confederation
13th	1878–1882	Michael J. O'Mara	Liberal	Robert John Parsons Jr.	Conservative	Robert John Kent	Liberal
14th	1882–1885	John Joseph Dearin	Conservative	Robert John Parsons Jr.	Conservative	Robert John Kent	Conservative
15th	1885–1886	Michael J. O'Mara	Liberal	Ambrose Shea	Liberal	Robert John Kent	Liberal
15th	1886–1887	Michael J. O'Mara	Liberal	Ambrose Shea	Liberal	Thomas J. Murphy	Liberal
15th	1887–1889	Michael J. O'Mara	Liberal	Robert John Parsons Jr.	Liberal	Thomas J. Murphy	Liberal
16th	1889–1890	John Joseph Dearin	Liberal	Jeremiah Halleran	Liberal	Thomas J. Murphy	Liberal
16th	1890–1893	Vacant		Jeremiah Halleran	Liberal	Thomas J. Murphy	Liberal
17th	1893–1894	James Patrick Fox	Liberal	Lawrence O'Brien Furlong	Conservative	Thomas J. Murphy	Liberal
17th	1894–1897	John P. Fox	Liberal	Lawrence O'Brien Furlong	Conservative	Charles Hutton	Liberal
18th	1897–1899	John P. Fox	Liberal	Lawrence O'Brien Furlong	Liberal	Thomas J. Murphy	Liberal
18th	1899–1900	John Dwyer	Liberal	Lawrence O'Brien Furlong	Liberal	Thomas J. Murphy	Liberal
19th	1900–1904	John Dwyer	Liberal	Lawrence O'Brien Furlong	Liberal	Thomas J. Murphy	Liberal
20th	1904–1908	John Dwyer	Liberal	James M. Kent	Liberal	George Shea	Liberal
21st	1908–1909	John Dwyer	Liberal	James M. Kent	Liberal	George Shea	Liberal
22nd	1909–1913	John Dwyer	Liberal	James M. Kent	Liberal	George Shea	Liberal
23rd	1913–1916	John Dwyer	Liberal	James M. Kent	Liberal	William J. Higgins	People's
23rd	1916–1917	John Dwyer	Liberal	Vacant		William J. Higgins	People's
23rd	1917–1919	Vacant		Vacant		William J. Higgins	People's
24th	1919–1923	Cyril J. Fox	Liberal-Progressive	Nicholas Vinnicombe	Liberal-Progressive	William J. Higgins	Liberal-Progressive
25th	1923–1924	Cyril J. Fox	Liberal-Labour-Progressive	Nicholas Vinnicombe	Liberal-Labour-Progressive	William J. Higgins	Liberal-Labour-Progressive
26th	1924–1928	Cyril J. Fox	Liberal-Conservative Progressive	Nicholas Vinnicombe	Liberal-Conservative Progressive	William J. Higgins	Liberal-Conservative Progressive

=== Dual-Member District (1928–1956) ===
Legislature	Years	Member	Party	Member	Party
St. John's City East
27th	1928–1932	Frederick C. Alderdice	Liberal-Conservative Progressive	Gerald G. Byrne	Liberal-Conservative Progressive
St. John's East
28th	1932–1934	Gerald G. Byrne	United Newfoundland	Edward Emerson	United Newfoundland
Commission of Government (1934–1949) Edgar Hickman, Gordon Higgins, and Robert Brown Job elected to the Newfoundland National Convention as the members for St. John's City East
29th	1949–1951	John Higgins	Progressive Conservative	Frank Fogwill	Progressive Conservative
30th	1952–1956	James D. Higgins	Progressive Conservative	Frank Fogwill	Progressive Conservative

=== Single-Member District (1956–2015) ===
Assembly	Years	Member	Party
St. John's Centre
31st	1956–1959	Augustine M. Duffy	Progressive Conservative
32nd	1959–1962	Augustine M. Duffy	United Newfoundland Party
33rd	1962–1966	Anthony Murphy	Progressive Conservative
34th	1966–1971	Anthony Murphy	Progressive Conservative
35th	1971–1972	Anthony Murphy	Progressive Conservative
36th	1972–1975	Anthony Murphy	Progressive Conservative
37th	1975–1979	Patrick McNicholas	Progressive Conservative
38th	1979–1982	Patrick McNicholas	Progressive Conservative
39th	1982–1985	Patrick McNicholas	Progressive Conservative
40th	1985–1989	Patrick McNicholas	Progressive Conservative
41st	1989–1993	Hubert Kitchen	Liberal
42nd	1993–1996	Hubert Kitchen	Liberal
St. John's East
43rd	1996–1999	John Ottenheimer	Progressive Conservative
44th	1999–2003	John Ottenheimer	Progressive Conservative
45th	2003–2007	John Ottenheimer	Progressive Conservative
46th	2007–2011	Ed Buckingham	Progressive Conservative
47th	2011–2015	George Murphy	New Democratic
See St. John's East-Quidi Vidi

== Election results ==
2011 Newfoundland and Labrador general election
Party	Candidate	Votes	%	±%
NDP	George Murphy	2,766	52.11	+35.51
Progressive Conservative	Ed Buckingham	2,175	40.98	-29.14
Liberal	Michael Duffy	367	6.91	-6.38
New Democratic gain from Progressive Conservative		Swing		+32.32

2007 Newfoundland and Labrador general election
Party	Candidate	Votes	%	±%
Progressive Conservative	Ed Buckingham	3,649	70.11	–
NDP	Gemma Schlamp-Hickey	864	16.60	
Liberal	Peter Adams	692	13.29	

2003 Newfoundland and Labrador general election
Party	Candidate	Votes	%	±%
Progressive Conservative	John Ottenheimer	4,151	69.85	–
NDP	Bruce Clarke	864	14.54	
Liberal	George Murphy	862	14.50	
Independent	Steve Durant	66	1.11	

1999 Newfoundland and Labrador general election
Party	Candidate	Votes	%	±%
Progressive Conservative	John Ottenheimer	3,774	63.40	
Liberal	Tom McGrath	1,559	26.19	
NDP	Barry Darby	600	10.08	

1996 Newfoundland and Labrador general election
Party	Candidate	Votes	%	±%
Progressive Conservative	John Ottenheimer	2,989	48.61	–
Liberal	Hubert Kitchen	2,340	38.05	
NDP	Sean Murray	796	12.94	

1993 Newfoundland general election
Party	Candidate	Votes	%	±%
Liberal	Hubert Kitchen	2,990		
Progressive Conservative	Paul Stapleton	2,464	–	–
NDP	Fraser March	874		

1989 Newfoundland general election
Party	Candidate	Votes	%	±%
Liberal	Hubert Kitchen	2,967		
Progressive Conservative	Patrick McNicholas	2,838	–	–
NDP	Vicky Silky	625		

1985 Newfoundland general election
Party	Candidate	Votes	%	±%
Progressive Conservative	Patrick McNicholas	3,332	–	–
Liberal	Mary Frances Philpott	2,229		
NDP	Nina Patey	976		

1982 Newfoundland general election
Party	Candidate	Votes	%	±%
Progressive Conservative	Patrick McNicholas	2357	–	–
Liberal	John Slattery	657		
NDP	Pobert Harry E. Cuff	293		

== See also ==
- List of Newfoundland and Labrador provincial electoral districts
- Canadian provincial electoral districts
