= William E. Brophy =

Canadian politician

William Edward Brophy (July 1, 1885 – after 1929) was a grocer and politician in Newfoundland. He represented St. John's East in the Newfoundland House of Assembly from 1927 to 1928.

== Biography ==
William was the son of Edward Brophy and Anne Walsh. He was born in St. John's in 1885. He was educated at St. Patrick's Hall. Brophy was elected to St. John's City Council as an alderman in 1925 and served until 1929. He was elected to the Newfoundland assembly in a 1927 by-election held after Nicholas Vinnicombe was named to the Board of Liquor Control. Brophy Lane and Brophy Place in St. John's are named in his honour.

In 1913, Brophy married Mollie Canning.
