= John Fox (Newfoundland politician) =

Newfoundland politician

John Fox (1818 – March 17, 1871) was a merchant and political figure in Newfoundland. He represented St. John's West in the Newfoundland and Labrador House of Assembly from 1855 to 1857.

He was born in Harbour Grace. Fox operated a fishery supply business in St. John's in partnership with his brother James. He served as a member of the Legislative Council from 1857 to 1860. Fox left Newfoundland for London, England in 1860, where he died in 1871.

His son Sir Charles Edmund Fox was Chief Judge of the Chief Court of Lower Burma from 1906 to 1917.
