= Charles Russell (Newfoundland journalist) =

Canadian politician

Charles Edward Russell (May 14, 1877 – October 30, 1937) was a journalist and politician in Newfoundland. He represented Harbour Grace in the Newfoundland House of Assembly from 1924 to 1928.

The son of Charles Russell and Mary Drover, he was born in Bay Roberts and was educated there and at the Central Training School in St. John's. From 1890 to 1895, Russell apprenticed as a printer with the Evening Telegram. He next worked as a clerk and then moved to Toronto, where he worked in real estate and printing. In 1901, he married Frances M. Pike. Little returned to Newfoundland in 1908 and bought a small printing plant from Harris and Wesley Mosdell in 1909, establishing the Bay Roberts Guardian in July of that year. Russell ran unsuccessfully for the Newfoundland assembly as an independent candidate in 1919. He was elected to the assembly in 1924 as a Liberal-Conservative. Russell was named to the Newfoundland cabinet as Minister of Public Works. He resigned from the government in 1926 due to disagreements about policy and sat as an independent until 1928. He did not run for reelection. After leaving politics, he wrote newspaper articles that advocated honesty in government and better roads for the outports.

Russell was a freemason and member of the Orange Order in Bay Roberts. He later married Otilia A. Leitland. He died in Bay Roberts at the age of 60.

The Bay Roberts Guardian was published weekly from July 1909 to July 1949; publication was suspended from October 27, 1920 to January 12, 1923. It was known simply as the Guardian until November 11, 1939; after that, it was called the Bay Roberts Guardian. The newspaper remained in the Russell family until it ceased operation in 1949.
