= John Joseph Dearin =

Newfoundland politician (1818–1890)

John J. Dearin MHA

Member of the Newfoundland House of Assembly for St. John's East
- In office November 6, 1889 – July 25, 1890 Serving with Jeremiah Halleran and Thomas J. Murphy
- Preceded by: Michael J. O'Mara; Robert J. Parsons Jr.
- Succeeded by: James P. Fox; Lawrence O. Furlong
- In office November 6, 1882 – October 31, 1885 Serving with Robert J. Kent and Robert J. Parsons Jr.
- Preceded by: Michael J. O'Mara
- Succeeded by: Michael J. O'Mara; Ambrose Shea
- In office November 8, 1873 – November 9, 1878 Serving with Robert J. Kent and Robert J. Parsons Sr.
- Preceded by: James Jordan; William P. Walsh
- Succeeded by: Michael J. O'Mara; Robert J. Parsons Jr.

Personal details
- Born: c. 1818 St. John's, Newfoundland Colony
- Died: July 25, 1890 (aged 71–72) St. John's, Newfoundland Colony
- Party: Anti-Confederation (1873–1874); Liberal (1874–1878, 1889–1890); Conservative (1882–1885)
- Spouse(s): Catherine (m. ?–1864) Bessie Furlong (m. 1866–1868)
- Children: 2
- Occupation: Pharmacist

John Joseph Dearin (c. 1818 – July 25, 1890) was a pharmacist and politician in Newfoundland. He represented St. John's East in the Newfoundland and Labrador House of Assembly from 1873 to 1878, from 1882 to 1885 and from 1889 to 1890.

He was born in St. John's, the son of William Dearin and Elizabeth King. Dearin apprenticed with a pharmacist in St. John's and then worked in Harbour Grace. He returned to St. John's where he opened an apothecary shop with his brother in the 1840s. Dearin also practised as a dentist. He opposed union with Canada and was a prominent proponent of the Newfoundland Railway. He was defeated when he ran for reelection in 1878 and 1885. Dearin died in office in St. John's in 1890.
