= Thomas J. Murphy (Newfoundland politician) =

Newfoundland politician (1861–1933)

Thomas J. Murphy MHA
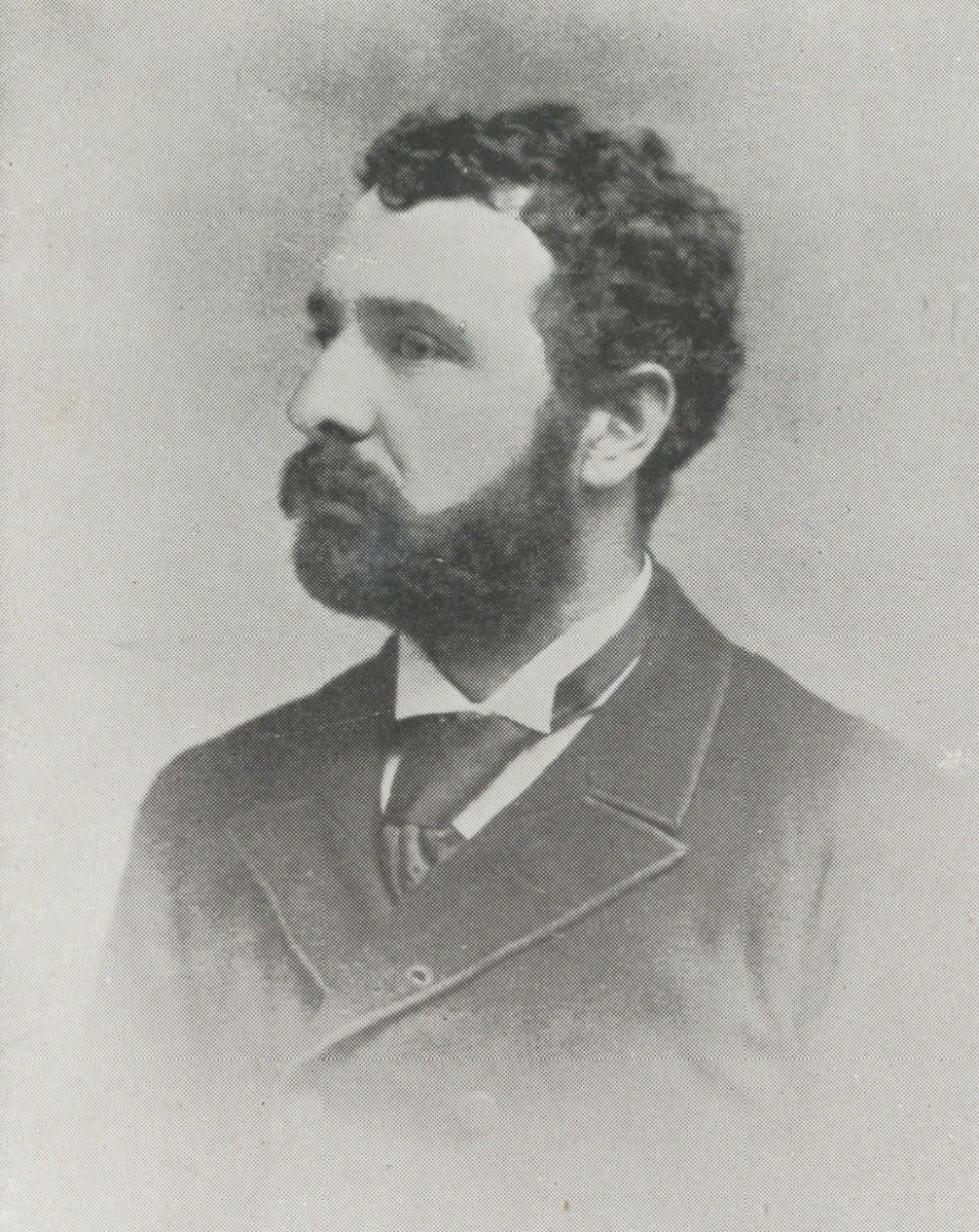
- Murphy in 1894

Member of the Newfoundland House of Assembly for St. John's East
- In office October 28, 1897 – October 31, 1904 Serving with John P. Fox (1897–1900); Lawrence O. Furlong (1897–1904); John Dwyer (1900–1904)
- Preceded by: Charles Hutton
- Succeeded by: James M. Kent; George Shea
- In office November 9, 1886 – November 10, 1894 Serving with Michael J. O'Mara (1886–1889); Ambrose Shea (1886–1887); Robert J. Parsons Jr. (1887–1889); John J. Dearin (1889–1890); Jeremiah Halleran (1889–1893); James P. Fox (1893–1894); Lawrence O. Furlong (1893–1894)
- Preceded by: Robert J. Kent
- Succeeded by: John P. Fox; Charles Hultan

Personal details
- Born: July 1, 1861 St. John's, Newfoundland Colony
- Died: May 29, 1933 (aged 71) St. John's, Newfoundland
- Party: Independent (1885–1886) Liberal (1886–1904)
- Spouse: Margaret Kearney
- Education: Saint Bonaventure's College
- Occupation: Lawyer

Thomas J. McCarthy Murphy (July 1, 1861 – May 29, 1933) was a lawyer and politician in Newfoundland. He represented St. John's East in the Newfoundland House of Assembly from 1886 to 1894 and from 1897 to 1904.

== Legal career ==
Murphy was born on July 1, 1861 in St. John's as the son of Thomas Murphy and Catherine (née McCarthy). He was educated at Saint Bonaventure's College. Murphy studied law with John Hoyles Boone and went on to practice in the same office. He was admitted to the bar in 1886. He married Margaret Kearney while in office.

== Politics ==
Murphy first ran unsuccessfully 1885 for the Harbour Main seat in the House of Assembly as an independent supporter of recently ousted Premier William Whiteway. He was then elected in a by-election held in St. John's East the following year. He was unseated in 1894 and then reelected in 1897.

Murphy served as crown prosecutor, as a member of the Fisheries Commission and as governor of the Savings Bank. In 1904, he was named deputy minister of justice. He retired from that post in 1907 to return to the practice of law. He died in St. John's on May 29, 1933.
