= James Sinclair Tait =

Newfoundland physician and politician (1849–1928)

J. Sinclair Tait MD MHA
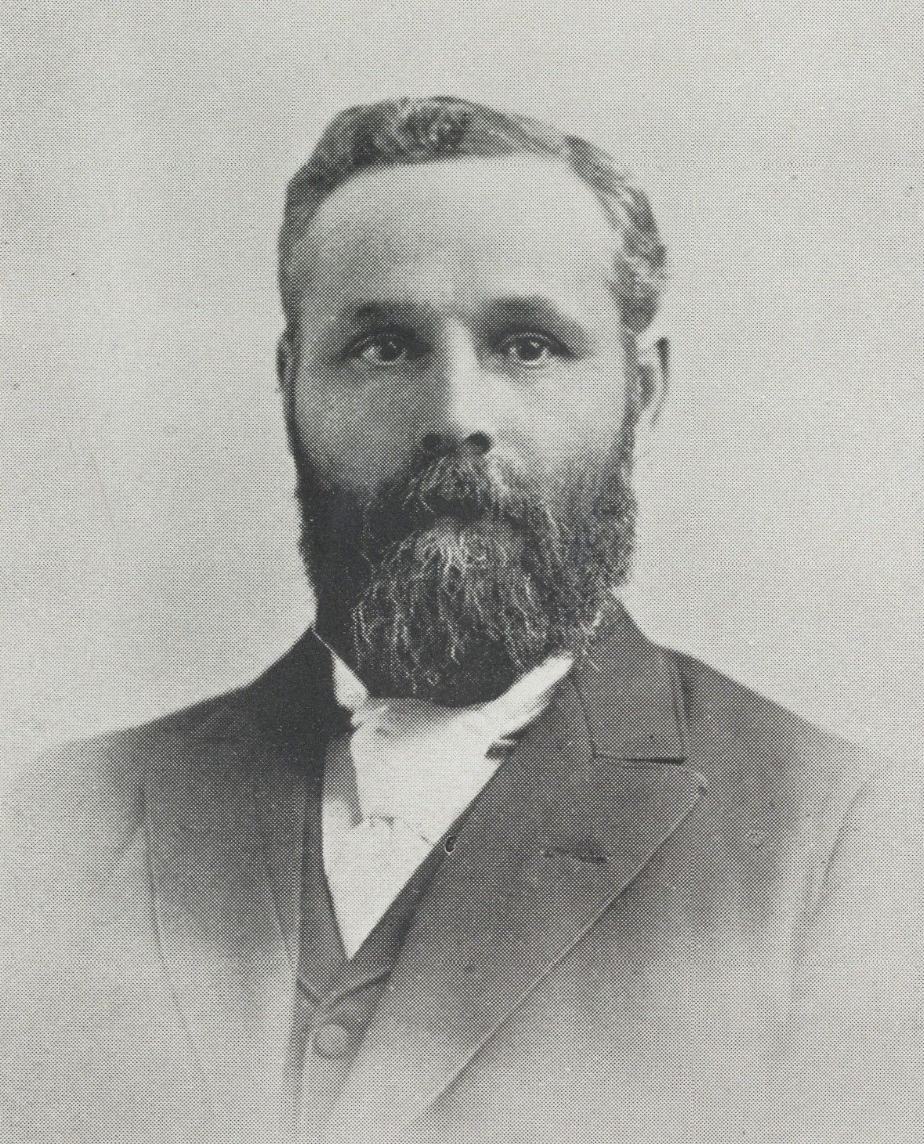
- Tait in 1894

Member of the Newfoundland House of Assembly for Burin
- In office November 6, 1889 – November 10, 1894 Serving with Edward Rothwell (1889–1892); James S. Winter (1892–1893); William B. Payne (1893–1894)
- Preceded by: Henry LeMessurier; John E. Peters
- Succeeded by: Henry Gear; James J. Pitman

Personal details
- Born: March 4, 1849 Wallace, Nova Scotia
- Died: July 5, 1928 (aged 79) St. John's, Newfoundland
- Party: Liberal
- Spouse: Sarah Elizabeth Calkin (m. 1882)
- Children: 5, including Robert
- Education: Mount Allison Wesleyan College (B.S., M.A.); University of Pennsylvania (M.D.); Royal College of Physicians; Royal College of Surgeons of Edinburgh
- Occupation: Physician

James Sinclair Tait (March 4, 1849 – July 5, 1928) was a physician, author and political figure in Newfoundland. As a Liberal supporter of Premier William Whiteway, he represented Burin in the Newfoundland and Labrador House of Assembly from 1889 to 1894.

== Early life and medical studies ==
Tait was born in Wallace, Nova Scotia, the son of James Tait and Catherine Sinclair, and was educated in Wallace, Amherst and at the Mount Allison Wesleyan College. He received a teaching certificate from the normal school in Truro and taught school in Brigus. He studied medicine with a doctor in Brigus and went on to receive a M.D. from the University of Pennsylvania. In 1882, Tait married Sarah Elizabeth Calkin. After practising in Brigus for several years, he continued his medical studies at the Royal College of Physicians in London and the Royal College of Surgeons of Edinburgh.

== Politics and medical superintendent ==
Tait was elected to the Newfoundland House of Assembly in 1889 as a supporter of Premier William Whiteway. He was reelected in 1893, but his election was overturned in 1894 after an appeal was launched by the Conservatives. He ran unsuccessfully for reelection in 1897. From 1894 to 1909 he served as secretary and registrar for the Newfoundland Medical Board, and as a member of the St. John's Board of Health from 1904 to 1909.

Tait also served as medical superintendent and resident physician at the Hospital for the Insane in Waterford. In 1896, he became a fellow of the Royal College of Surgeons. During his time as superintendent and resident physician, it was discovered that he had unprofessional misconduct allegations made against him with the St. John's Medical Society but the Liberal Government refused to remove him from the position. He was a member of the municipal council for St. John's from 1916 to 1920. Tait died in St. John's at the age of 79.

He contributed medical articles and poetry to various local periodicals and published a pamphlet Tuberculosis in 1916. His ballad "Allan Lee" appeared in Songs of Newfoundland published in 1917.
