= George Shea (politician) =

Newfoundland politician

The Honourable George Shea MHA MLC
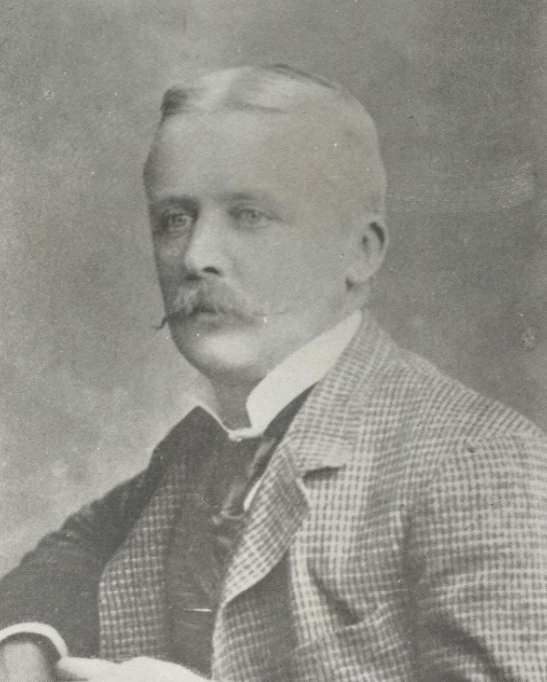
- Shea in 1894

Minister without portfolio
- In office 1904–1909
- Prime Minister: Robert Bond
- In office 1898–1900
- Premier: James W. Winter

Member of the Legislative Council of Newfoundland
- In office 1920 – September 13, 1932
- Appointed by: Richard Squires

Member of the Newfoundland House of Assembly for St. John's East
- In office October 31, 1904 – October 30, 1913 Serving with John Dwyer and James M. Kent
- Preceded by: Lawrence Furlong; Thomas J. Murphy
- Succeeded by: William J. Higgins

1st Mayor of St. John's, Newfoundland
- In office June 19, 1902 – June 26, 1906
- Preceded by: Position established
- Succeeded by: Michael Gibbs

Member of the Newfoundland House of Assembly for Ferryland
- In office October 28, 1897 – November 8, 1900 Serving with Michael Cashin
- Preceded by: Daniel Greene
- Succeeded by: James D. Ryan
- In office October 31, 1885 – November 6, 1893 Serving with Daniel Greene
- Preceded by: Augustus F. Goodridge
- Succeeded by: Michael Cashin

Personal details
- Born: July 4, 1851 St. John's, Newfoundland Colony
- Died: September 13, 1932 (aged 81) St. John's, Newfoundland
- Party: Liberal (1885–1889, 1904–1913); Conservative (1889–1904)
- Spouse(s): Louisa Pinsent (m. 1888) Margaret Rendell (m. 1900)
- Relatives: Edward Dalton Shea (father); Ambrose Shea (uncle); Robert John Pinsent (father-in-law)
- Education: Ampleforth College
- Occupation: Merchant

George Edward Shea (July 4, 1851 – September 13, 1932) was a Newfoundland politician who served as the first mayor of St. John's, Newfoundland.

The son of Gertrude Corbett and Edward D. Shea, he was born in St. John's and was educated there and at Ampleforth College in England. He was married twice: first to Louisa Catherine Pinsent in 1888 and then to Margaret Rendell in 1900.

In 1870, Shea became a clerk in the family business, Shea and Company. The company was shipping agent for the Allan Line of Royal Mail Steamships and the Ross Steamship Line. In 1887, when his uncle Ambrose Shea was appointed governor of the Bahamas, George replaced him as the firm's managing partner. He was later an agent for the North British Mercantile Insurance Company and a member of the Newfoundland Board of Revenue.

In 1885, Shea ran for the Ferryland seat in the Newfoundland assembly as a Liberal; his father had also represented Ferryland in the assembly. He was elected by acclamation as a supporter of Ambrose Shea, who led the Catholic-Liberal party in a highly sectarian contest. Shea was re-elected as an independent in 1889, but was defeated by Liberal candidates Michael Cashin and Daniel J. Greene in 1893. Again elected to the Newfoundland assembly for Ferryland in 1897, Shea served for two years as minister without portfolio in the government of Sir James Spearman Winter. He did not run for reelection to the assembly in 1900. In 1902 Shea was elected as the first mayor of St. John's. During his term, he improved the water system and helped bring the city's finances under control. Shea served as mayor until 1906, when he was defeated by lawyer Michael Gibbs.

He had meanwhile re-entered the House of Assembly in 1904 as the Liberal representative for the district of St. John's East. He served as minister without portfolio in the government of Sir Robert Bond from 1904 to 1909 and was re-elected in 1908 and 1909. After Bond decided against a return to politics in 1917 and 1918, Shea endorsed Richard Squires and the Liberal Reform Party. Shea retired from business in 1919 and the following year was appointed by Squires to the Legislative Council. He occasionally served as acting prime minister in Squire's absence.

He also served on the board of governors of the Newfoundland Savings Bank and as chair of the Permanent Marine Disasters Fund Committee.

Shea died in St. John's at the age of 81.
