= Thomas C. Duder =

Newfoundland merchant and politician (1850–1912)

The Honourable Thomas C. Duder MHA
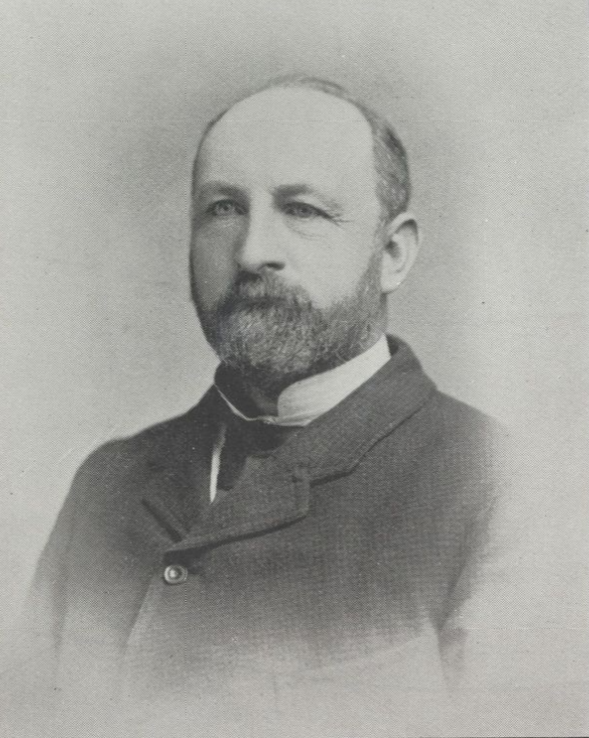
- Duder in 1894

Minister of Agriculture and Mines Surveyor General (1897–1898)
- In office 1897–1900
- Preceded by: Henry J. B. Woods
- Succeeded by: Eli Dawe

Member of the Newfoundland House of Assembly for Fogo
- In office November 6, 1893 – November 8, 1900
- Preceded by: James Rolls
- Succeeded by: Henry Earle

Personal details
- Born: April 16, 1850 St. John's, Newfoundland Colony
- Died: December 29, 1912 (aged 62) St. John's, Newfoundland
- Party: Conservative
- Spouse: Emily Jones Haddon (m. 1874)
- Education: Wesleyan Academy
- Occupation: Merchant

Thomas C. Duder (April 16, 1850 – December 29, 1912) was a merchant and political figure in Newfoundland. He represented Fogo in the Newfoundland and Labrador House of Assembly from 1893 to 1900.

== Business career ==
Duder was born in St. John's and was educated at the Wesleyan Academy there. After leaving school, he worked as an accountant in the firm operated by his cousin Edwin Duder, Jr. and, in 1874, became head of the branch at Fogo. In 1875, he was named a justice of the peace for the northern district. In 1895, Duder went into business on his own.

== Politics ==
Duder was elected to the House of Assembly as the representative for Fogo in the 1893 election. He served in the Executive Council as financial secretary, chairman of the Board of Works and Minister of Agriculture and Mines. He was named a magistrate at Bonne Bay in 1900, serving until his death in 1912.
