= Robert John Kent =

Newfoundland politician (1835–1893)

The Honourable Robert J. Kent QC
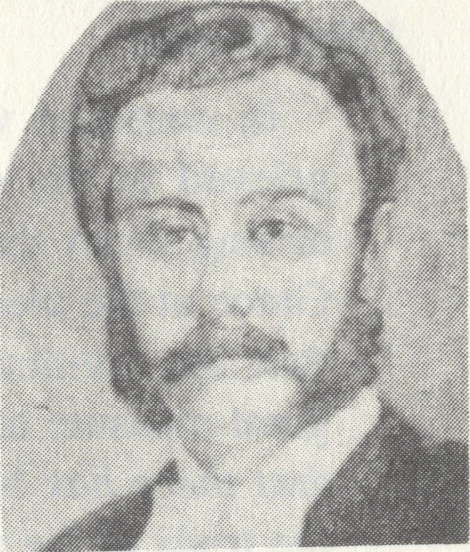

13th Speaker of the Newfoundland House of Assembly
- In office 1883 – February 1885
- Preceded by: A. J. W. McNeilly
- Succeeded by: Robert Bond

Member of the Newfoundland House of Assembly for St. John's East
- In office November 8, 1873 – November 9, 1886 Serving with John J. Dearin (1873–1878, 1882–1885); Robert J. Parsons Sr. (1873–1878); Michael J. O'Mara (1878–1882, 1885–1886); Robert J. Parsons Jr. (1878–1885); Ambrose Shea (1885–1886)
- Preceded by: James Jordan; William P. Walsh
- Succeeded by: Thomas J. Murphy

Personal details
- Born: 1835 Waterford, Ireland
- Died: September 29, 1893 (aged 57–58) St. John's, Newfoundland Colony
- Party: Anti-Confederation (1873–1874); Liberal (1874–1878, 1885–1886); Conservative (1882–1885)
- Spouse: Ellen F. Donnelly (m. 1866)
- Children: 4, including James
- Relatives: John Kent (uncle); Michael Fleming (uncle); Patrick Morris (greatuncle)
- Education: St John's College, Waterford
- Occupation: Lawyer

Robert John Kent (1835 – September 29, 1893) was an Irish-born lawyer and politician in Newfoundland. He represented St. John's East in the Newfoundland and Labrador House of Assembly from 1873 to 1886.

He was born in Waterford, the son of James Kent and Mary Carigan. He came to Newfoundland in 1856, working as a clerk for his uncle John Kent. Kent studied law with Hugh William Hoyles and was called to the bar in 1864. He entered practice with Joseph Ignatius Little in St. John's. In 1866, he married Ellen F. Donnelly. He was first elected to the assembly as a supporter of Charles James Fox Bennett. Kent's law firm represented the Newfoundland Railway Company. In 1884 and 1885, he defended 19 Catholics charged with murder following riots involving Orange and Catholic supporters in Harbour Grace. He was speaker for the Newfoundland assembly from 1883 until 1885, when Kent resigned as speaker after a Conservative-Liberal coalition broke up. He left politics in 1886. Kent also served as president of the Benevolent Irish Society from 1883 to 1891 and of the Law Society of Newfoundland from 1888 to 1893. His law office was destroyed in the Great Fire of 1892, and died in St. John's soon afterwards in 1893.
