= James Francis McGrath =

Newfoundland politician (1859–1902)

James F. McGrath MHA
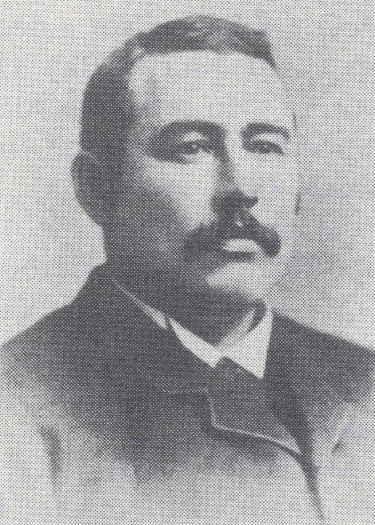
- McGrath in 1894

Member of the Newfoundland House of Assembly for Placentia and St. Mary's
- In office October 31, 1885 – November 10, 1894 Serving with William Donnelly (1885–1889, 1893–1894); George H. Emerson (1885–1894); Richard O'Dwyer (1889–1893)
- Preceded by: Albert Bradshaw; Michael Tobin
- Succeeded by: John T. Dunphy; Richard T. McGrath; Michael Tobin

Personal details
- Born: May 23, 1859 Little Placentia, Newfoundland Colony
- Died: October 29, 1902 (aged 43) Halifax, Nova Scotia, Canada
- Party: Liberal
- Spouse(s): Theresa Power (m. 1882–1886) Catherine McCarthy (m. 1889–1895) Mary Anne Aylward (m. 1896)
- Children: 6, including John and James
- Relatives: Richard McGrath (father); Richard T. McGrath (brother)
- Education: Saint Bonaventure's College
- Occupation: Fisherman

James Francis McGrath (May 23, 1859 – October 29, 1902) was a fisherman and political figure in Newfoundland. He represented Placentia and St. Mary's in the Newfoundland and Labrador House of Assembly from 1885 to 1894 as a Liberal.

== Early life ==
James F. McGrath was born in Little Placentia, the son of Richard McGrath and Margaret Fanning. He was raised and educated in Oderin where his father was Customs Collector and Stipendary Magistrate. He received his secondary education at Saint Bonaventure's College in St.John's. McGrath began work as a fisherman operating his own boat and later owned a fishing business operating catching cod on the Grand Banks and herring.

== Politics ==
McGrath was first elected to the House of Assembly for the district of Placentia and St. Mary's in 1885, which had earlier been represented by his father. He served as a member of the Newfoundland Fisheries Commission from 1889 to 1895. McGrath was re-elected in 1893 and was named to the Executive Council as chairman of the Board of Works. He was forced to resign from the assembly the following year after the Tories filed petitions against 15 Liberal and one Independent incumbent for partisan use of government funds. He was disqualified from holding office again.

His brother Richard was elected to represent Placentia and St. Mary's in the subsequent by-election. In 1895, McGrath was named governor of the Newfoundland penitentiary, a position he filled from April 1, 1895. McGrath died in Halifax at the age of 43 while returning from kidney surgery in Boston following an emergency operation by his uncle Dr. Donald A. Campbell. His body was returned to St. John's and he was buried in the Belvedere Roman Catholic Cemetery.

== Family ==
McGrath was married three times: first in 1882 to Theresa Mary Power (1859–1886), then in 1889 to Catherine (Kate) McCarthy (1859–1895) and finally in 1896 to Mary Anne (Min) Aylward (1859–1943). In all he had 6 children, 3 boys and 3 girls (including twin daughters who died as children). One son, John William McGrath was an ice hockey player, and another son, James, became a doctor and eventually entered politics, becoming Minister of Health in the Joey Smallwood administration. His daughter Elizabeth Anne McGrath studied law and in 1934 was the second woman admitted to the bar in Newfoundland.
