= Edward Rothwell =

Canadian politician

Edward Rothwell (ca 1844 – June 30, 1892) was an English-born merchant and politician in Newfoundland. He represented Burin in the Newfoundland House of Assembly from 1889 to 1892.

He was born in Manchester and came to Newfoundland in 1863 to work as a bookkeeper for a firm in St. John's. In 1887, he established a fishery supply firm in partnership with John Bowring

Rothwell died at St. John's in 1892 while still in office.
