= Richard Horton O'Dwyer =

Canadian politician

Richard Harton O'Dwyer (1858–1922) was a Newfoundland merchant and politician. He represented Placentia and St. Mary's in the Newfoundland House of Assembly from 1889 to 1893 as a Liberal.

The son of merchant and politician Richard O'Dwyer (1811 - 1875), a native of Waterford, Ireland and Wilhelmina Harton (1822 - 1887), a native of Banagher, Ireland, he was born in St. John's and moved to England with his family in 1868, his father looking after the importing side of the family's business and leaving the Newfoundland side of the business to be run by his younger brother, John (1813 - 1878). O'Dwyer returned to St. John's at the age of 21, after the death of his unmarried uncle John, to take over the family business with his brother John.

He served in the Newfoundland cabinet as Receiver General from 1890 to 1893. O'Dwyer was unsuccessful when he ran for reelection in 1893. He was subsequently named commissioner of public charities, continuing to hold that post until he died in 1922.

Richard O'Dwyer Senior built the O'Dwyer Block on Water Street in St. John's between 1846 and 1849. Unlike other commercial buildings of the time, it was not built of wood and survived the Great Fire of 1892. It has been designated as a heritage structure by the Heritage Foundation of Newfoundland and Labrador.
