= Richard T. McGrath =

Newfoundland politician

Richard T. McGrath (1868 – 1934) was a politician in Newfoundland. He represented Placentia and St. Mary's in the Newfoundland House of Assembly from 1894 to 1897 and from 1900 to 1904 as a Liberal.

The son of Richard McGrath and Margaret Fanning, he was born in Oderin. He began work as customs sub-collector in Oderin and LaManche in Placentia Bay in 1890. He was elected to the assembly in a 1894 by-election held after his brother James was disqualified. McGrath was defeated when he ran for reelection in 1897. After that, he served as stipendiary magistrate at Oderin for almost 20 years, stepping down from that post temporarily while he served a second term in the assembly. He next served as customs agent at St. John's from 1919 until his death.
