= James Murray (Newfoundland politician) =

Newfoundland merchant and politician (1842–1900)

James Murray MHA

Member of the Newfoundland House of Assembly for Burgeo and La Poile
- In office November 6, 1889 – September 10, 1894
- Preceded by: Alexander Mackay
- Succeeded by: Henry Y. Mott

Personal details
- Born: April 29, 1842 St. John's, Newfoundland Colony
- Died: January 16, 1900 (aged 57) St. John's, Newfoundland Colony
- Party: Independent
- Spouse: Jennie Ritchie (m. 1873)
- Occupation: Merchant

James Murray (April 29, 1842 – January 16, 1900) was a merchant and politician Newfoundland. He represented Burgeo-LaPoile in the Newfoundland and Labrador House of Assembly from 1889 to 1894 as an independent.

== Early life and business career ==
Murray was born in St. John's, the son of James Murray and Elizabeth Stacey. Murray married Jennie Ritchie. He formed a commission agency and importing company in partnership with his brother. Murray became sole owner after his brother died in 1874. He later expanded into the fishery supply business.

== Politics and later life ==
Murray ran unsuccessfully for the district of Burgeo and La Poile in 1882, where he campaigned as "the Fisherman's Friend." In a series of subsequent articles published in the Evening Telegram, Murray blamed his defeat on the undue influence of merchants and clergyman in using threats to sway the vote. He was eventually elected in 1889 after the introduction of the secret ballot.

Murray was re-elected in 1893. He continued to campaign as "the Fisherman's Friend," which D. W. Prowse opined was "the only comic element" in a generally acerbic election. Murray's victory was overturned in 1894 alongside most of his Liberal colleagues through the Corrupt Practices Act. The resulting political instability exacerbated the 1894 financial crisis which, together with the effects of the Great Fire of 1892, led to the failure of Murray's business. He would make an attempt to regain his seat in the subsequent 1897 election, but he was unsuccessful.

Following his ousting from political office, Murray became a publisher of periodicals, releasing the Anti-Confederate and Centenary Magazine. He died at home in St. John's on January 16, 1900.
