= Nicholas Vinnicombe =

Canadian politician

- Born: January 14, 1877; St. John's, Newfoundland, British Empire
- Died: April 10, 1928 (aged 51); St. John's, Newfoundland, British Empire
- Spouse: Annie Sutton
- Parent(s): Nicholas Vinnicombe Sr. Hannah McCarthy

Nicholas Joseph Vinnicombe (January 14, 1877 – April 10, 1928) was a merchant and politician in Newfoundland. He represented St. John's East in the Newfoundland House of Assembly from 1919 to 1925.

== Early life, family and education ==
"Nix" was born on January 14, 1877, in St. John's, Newfoundland. His parents were Nicholas Vinnicombe and Hannah McCarthy. He was educated at Saint Bonaventure's College. In 1905, Vinnicombe married Annie Sutton.

== Sports career ==
He was also a well-known athlete, playing cricket, hockey and soccer and competing in rowing at various regattas. A hockey goalie, Vinnicombe was the first name engraved on the Boyle Trophy when it was first awarded in 1904. He competed on championship hockey teams in 1902, 1904, 1905, 1907 and 1909 and played on several championship soccer teams. Vinnicombe was inducted into the Sport Newfoundland and Labrador Hall of Fame in 1980. He was named to the Newfoundland and Labrador Soccer Hall of Fame in 1985.

== Political career ==
In 1892, he went to work for the merchant James Stott. He set up his own licensed establishment in 1904. Vinnicombe served on St. John's municipal council from 1916 to 1925. He was a member of the municipal commission and deputy mayor from 1920 to 1921. He was first elected to the Newfoundland assembly in 1919 and won reelection in 1923 and 1924. In 1925, he was named to the Board of Liquor Control.

He died suddenly in St. John's at the age of 51.

== Honours and awards ==
- Inducted into the Sport Newfoundland and Labrador Hall of Fame in 1980 in the athlete category.
- Vinnicombe Street and Vinnicombe Place in St. John's were named in his honour.
