= James Patrick Fox =

Canadian politician

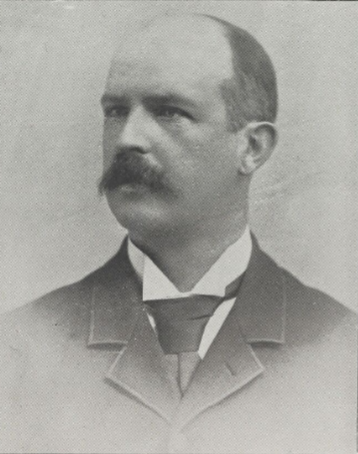

Member of the Legislative Council of Newfoundland
- In office 1890–1890
- Monarch: Queen Victoria

Member of the St. John’s Municipal Council
- In office 1888–1890
- Monarch: Queen Victoria

Member of the House of Assembly for St. John's East
- In office 1890 – 1894 (removed from office)
- Monarch: Queen Victoria

Personal details
- Born: 2 March 1860 St. John's, Newfoundland
- Died: 27 February 1899 (aged 38) St. John's, Newfoundland
- Spouse: Isabelle Langrishe LeGallais
- Children: 6

James Patrick Fox (March 2, 1860 – February 27, 1899) was a politician and office holder, born in St. John’s, Newfoundland to James and Bridget (Power) Fox. James P. Fox was the first person elected to the assembly under a new system under Prime Minister Sir William Whiteway legislation extending the right to vote in elections for the House of Assembly to all males 21 years of age and older.

== Family ==
Fox had married Isabelle Langrishe LeGallais, a great-granddaughter of Dr. William Carson on September 21, 1882. One of Isabelle and James' six children, John (Jack) Fox, was Newfoundland’s Rhodes Scholar for 1911 and served with distinction in the Newfoundland Regiment in the First World War.

== Career ==
Fox became a partner in his father’s firm, James Fox and Sons, in 1882. Fox Senior had been a member of the Legislative Council, the upper house in the bicameral system of government under which Newfoundland operated in the period between 1855 and 1934. Such as it was, Fox was exposed at an early age and it was something in which he developed a keen interest.

In 1888, he became a member of the first St. John’s municipal council. Consisted of seven members: five members elected on a ward system and two members appointed by the Newfoundland Government, Fox, along with James Goodfellow, who was the first chair of the council, was one of the government appointees.

At 30 years old, Fox left municipal council in 1890 when he was appointed to the Legislative Council by Prime Minister Sir William Whiteway. He then resigned Legislative Council to run in a by-election to fill a seat after Dr. John Dearin had died suddenly. Fox won the seat making him the first person elected to the House of Assembly under the new Manhood Suffrage Act of 1890. He was again reelected in St. John’s East in the general election of November 6, 1893.

Fox was named as Receiver General, the chief financial officer in the administration. On January 6, 1894, the Conservatives filed petitions under the Corrupt Practices Act charging 15 Liberals and Independent MHA James Murray with bribery and corruption. Fox was one of those charged.

On May 5, the court found Fox guilty as charged. His seat was declared vacant along with James Murphy and they were disqualified from running for election to the House of Assembly in future elections. Fox's brother, John F. Fox, ran for the Liberals in the Nov. 10 by-election and won the seat.

== Newfoundland hockey pioneer ==
James Fox was one of the pioneers of organized hockey in Newfoundland as a member of the first St. John's Hockey Club in the fall of 1895. He also participated in what is regarded as Newfoundland's earliest recorded hockey game in February 1896 on Quidi Vidi lake in the capital city of St. John's. In 1897 Fox was the first president of the St. John's Hockey Association that subsequently became the Newfoundland Hockey Association, the predecessor of the Newfoundland Amateur Hockey Association in 1935.

== Death ==
James died at the age of 38 of a massive heart attack at his St. John's home on February 27, 1899. He was manager of the Prince of Wale's Rink and had just returned home after helping prepare the ice for a planned hockey match that evening. At the time of his death, he left to mourn his wife Isabel and four children under fifteen.

== See also ==
- List of people of Newfoundland and Labrador
- List of communities in Newfoundland and Labrador
