= Lawrence O'Brien Furlong =

Newfoundland politician (1856–1908)

The Honourable Lawrence O'Brien Furlong
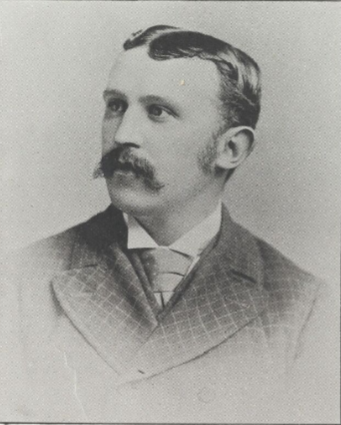

Speaker of the House of Assembly of Newfoundland
- In office 1894–1897

Speaker of the House of Assembly of Newfoundland
- In office 1901–1904

Personal details
- Born: 7 August 1845 St. John's, Newfoundland
- Died: 2 October 1908 (aged 52) St. John's, Newfoundland
- Spouse: Helen Carty

Lawrence O'Brien Furlong (January 12, 1856 – October 2, 1908) was a merchant and political figure in Newfoundland. He represented St. John's East in the Newfoundland and Labrador House of Assembly from 1893 to 1904 and was speaker for the assembly from 1894 to 1897 and from 1901 to 1904.

He was born in St. John's, the son of James Furlong, and was educated there and at the Collège Sainte-Marie de Montréal. Furlong opened a dry goods business in partnership with his brothers in 1877. In 1884, he married Helen Carty. Furlong opened his own business as a commission agent in 1890. He ran unsuccessfully for the St. John's East in the assembly in 1889. In 1893, he was elected as a tory in St. John's East. He was chosen chairman of the Board of Works in April 1894 but resigned to become speaker of the assembly in August. He was reelected in St. John's East in 1897 and 1900 as a Liberal. In 1905, he was named cashier for the Newfoundland Savings Bank. Furlong died in St. John's of acute bronchitis at the age of 52.
