= Robert Watson (Newfoundland politician) =

Newfoundland civil servant and politician (1867–1930)

The Honourable Robert Watson MHA

Colonial Secretary
- In office 1909–1913
- Prime Minister: Edward Morris
- Preceded by: Robert Bond
- Succeeded by: John R. Bennett

Member of the Newfoundland House of Assembly for Trinity Bay
- In office November 2, 1908 – October 30, 1913 Serving with George W. Gushue (1908–1909); Arthur W. Miller (1908–1909); Edwin Grant (1909–1913); Richard Squires (1909–1913)
- Preceded by: William F. Lloyd
- Succeeded by: John Abbott; William Coaker; Robert G. Winsor
- In office 1902 – October 31, 1904 Serving with George W. Gushue and William Warren
- Preceded by: William Horwood; George M. Johnson
- Succeeded by: William F. Lloyd; Arthur W. Miller
- In office October 28, 1897 – November 8, 1900 Serving with Robert S. Bremner (1897–1900); Levi March (1897); John A. Robinson (1898–1900)
- Preceded by: George W. Gushue; William Horwood; George M. Johnson

Personal details
- Born: September 1, 1863 Hant's Harbour, Newfoundland Colony
- Died: May 4, 1930 (aged 66) St. John's, Newfoundland
- Party: Conservative (1897–1907); People's (1907–1913)
- Spouse: Dora Pye
- Occupation: Civil servant

Robert Watson (September 1, 1863 – May 4, 1930) was a civil servant and political figure in Newfoundland. He represented Trinity Bay in the Newfoundland and Labrador House of Assembly from 1897 to 1900, from 1902 to 1904 and from 1908 to 1913 as a Conservative and later as a member of the People's Party.

== Biography ==
He was born in Hant's Harbour, the son of Ellis C. Watson. He served in the Executive Council as Minister of Posts and Telegraphs from 1897 to 1900 and colonial secretary from 1909 to 1913. Watson was manager of the Newfoundland Savings Bank from 1913 to 1916. He served as private secretary to the Governor of Newfoundland from 1916 to 1930. He died in St. John's at the age of 66.

Watson was a founding member of the FOMOWA Fishing Club alongside Samuel J. Foote, Walter S. Monroe, J. Morey, and William Warren. The club's name was made up of the first initials of each founder's surname.
