= Alfred B. Morine =

Newfoundland politician

The Honourable Sir Alfred B. Morine KC
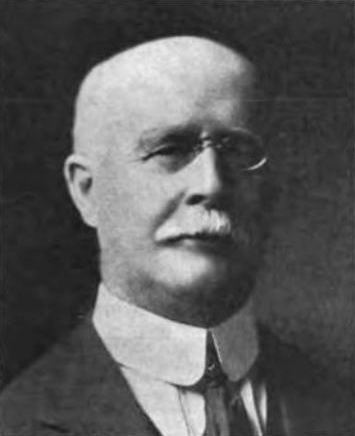
- Morine in 1914

Minister without portfolio
- In office 1924–1928
- Prime Minister: Walter S. Monroe

Minister of Marine and Fisheries
- In office 1899–1900
- Premier: James S. Winter
- Preceded by: Abram Kean (acting)
- Succeeded by: Thomas J. Murphy

Colonial Secretary
- In office July 1894 – December 1894
- Premier: Augustus F. Goodridge
- Preceded by: Robert Bond
- Succeeded by: William Horwood
Legislative offices
Member of the Legislative Council of Newfoundland
In office 1924–1928
Nominated by	Walter S. Monroe
Appointed by	William Allardyce
Member of the Newfoundland House of Assembly for Bonavista Bay
In office November 26, 1914 – November 3, 1919 Serving with Robert G. Winsor and John Abbott
Preceded by	William Coaker
Succeeded by	William Coaker
In office November 29, 1897 – November 6, 1906 Serving with John Cowan (1897–1900); Darius Blandford (1897–1904); Mark Chaplin (1900–1906); Sydney Blandford (1904–1906)
Preceded by	John A. Robinson
Succeeded by	Donald Morison
In office June 12, 1886 – October 28, 1897 Serving with Abram Kean (1886–1889); Frederick White (1886–1889); Samuel Blandford (1889–1893); Donald Morison (1889–1897); Darius Blandford (1893–1897)
Preceded by	James L. Noonan
Succeeded by	John A. Robinson

Personal details
- Born: Alfred Bishop Morine; March 31, 1857 Port Medway, Nova Scotia
- Died: December 18, 1944 (aged 87) Toronto, Ontario, Canada
- Party: Conservative (1886–1906); Fishermen's Protective Union (1913–1916)
- Spouse: Alice Mason (m. 1894)
- Occupation: Architect

Sir Alfred Bishop Morine KC (March 31, 1857 – December 18, 1944) was a journalist, lawyer and political figure in Newfoundland. He represented Bonavista Bay in the Newfoundland and Labrador House of Assembly from 1886 to 1906 as a Conservative and from 1913 to 1916 as a member of the Fishermen's Protective Union.

== Biography ==
Morine was born in Port Medway, Nova Scotia, the son of Alfred Morine and Mary Dolliver, and was educated in Port Medway and Liverpool. Morine was editor for newspapers in Nova Scotia and then for the Evening Mercury in St. John's. He ran unsuccessfully for a seat in the Newfoundland assembly in 1885. James L. Noonan was named to the Executive Council in 1885, which required him to run for reelection: Noonan was defeated by Morine in an 1886 by-election. In 1892, Morine entered the study of law at Dalhousie University, was called to the Newfoundland and Nova Scotia bars in 1894 and set up practice in St. John's. Morine ran unsuccessfully for a Nova Scotia seat in the Canadian House of Commons in 1892. He married Alice Mason in 1894.

In 1894, Morine convinced the Tory opposition to file petitions against a number of elected Liberals under the Corrupt Practices Act; this resulted in 15 Liberals, including the Premier William Whiteway, and one Independent member being unseated and the temporary return of the Tories to power. Morine was named colonial secretary in the Executive Council. The unseated members were barred from running in future elections; however, this restriction was later removed when the Liberals returned to power following a series of by-elections to fill the vacated seats. During the brief Conservative time in power, the colony suffered a financial crisis after two banks failed unexpectedly. When the Conservatives returned to power again in 1897, Morine was named to the Executive Council as Minister of Finance. He negotiated a long-term contract with Robert Gillespie Reid for the expansion of the railway in Newfoundland; the contract was unpopular with both Newfoundlanders and the British government because it was believed to be too generous to the Reid family. At the time, Morine was also acting as solicitor for the Reids. The Liberals were returned to power in 1900, with the railway contract being a major issue in the election. Morine was now leader of the Conservative opposition.

In 1906, he resigned his seat in the Newfoundland assembly, moved to Toronto, was called to the Ontario bar and set up practice in Toronto. Morine ran unsuccessfully in the riding of Shelburne and Queen's in the 1908 federal election. He returned to Newfoundland in 1912 and was elected to the assembly in a by-election held the following year. He resigned his seat in 1916 and returned to Toronto. Morine was named Minister of Justice in the Newfoundland Executive Council in 1919; he was defeated by William Coaker when he ran for reelection. He served in the Legislative Council of Newfoundland from 1924 to 1928. He was knighted in 1928. Morine died in Toronto at the age of 87.
