= Robert Dyer (clergyman) =

Canadian minister and educator

Robert Dyer (6 March 1808 – 4 February 1887) left the village of Heytesbury, in the county of Wiltshire, England, to voyage across the Atlantic Ocean to serve as a Newfoundland School Society teacher in the fishing community of Greenspond, Newfoundland. The Newfoundland School Society was established by the English merchant, Samuel Codner, who realised the need for educating the poor population of Newfoundland, and other poor colonies in British North America as well. Dyer first arrived in Newfoundland in 1839 and began his career as a teacher. He stayed in Greenspond for twenty years, earning the respect and admiration of the inhabitants and those who met or worked with him. Dyer was also ordained a Church of England Deacon in 1849; therefore, his work in Greenspond consisted of both teaching and ministerial duties. Dyer and his family later moved to Alberton, Prince Edward Island, where he was a minister in a Church of England Parish.

== Early life ==
Robert Dyer was born on 6 March 1808 to Thomas and Sarah (Smith) Dyer, who lived in the county of Wiltshire, England. Records show that in 1837, Dyer was listed as a shoemaker in the village of Heytesbury, just a few miles from Chitterne, also in the county of Wiltshire. Robert Dyer's great grandfather, Simon Dyer Senior, had also been a shoemaker in Heytesbury. On 3 August 1837, Dyer sent a letter of recommendation from the Vicarage in Chitterne, signed by a Reverend J. Leach Povey to the Newfoundland School Society, as he wished to serve as a teacher in Newfoundland.

== Training ==
Dyer's application was accepted by the Newfoundland School Society (NSS) and he entered into Westminster Central School for training in 1838. The school was set up to train teachers for England and Wales, but eventually contributed greatly to the training of teachers for other countries and colonies of Britain. The school was created for the elementary education of the 'humble poor'. The training was for masters and mistresses who wished to teach in schools that were created for children of the 'labouring classes'. Dyer encountered some difficulties during his training to become a teacher for educating the poor; however, by March 1839, after about four months, he had successfully completed his training as an NSS teacher.

== Greenspond ==
Robert Dyer arrived in Newfoundland in 1839 to begin his twenty-year career as NSS school master in Greenspond, Bonavista Bay, which he recorded almost daily in his diary. He taught in a Church of England school system at a time when the Church, and not the state, played a central role in the development and delivery of the curriculum. He worked in a single-room school that frequently accommodated more than 100 pupils of all ages and grade levels.

Education was not free; most people had to pay subscriptions to the teacher for his salary and maintenance of the school. However, many families in Newfoundland during this period were poor and often could not pay. In these cases, the teacher's salary was supplemented by the Society for the Propagation of the Gospel in Foreign Parts, and aid also came from the Society for Promoting Christian Knowledge.

Education in Newfoundland faced many obstacles, such as irregular attendance. Dyer notes a number of reasons for absenteeism in his diary – some older children worked in the fishery during the spring and summer, others moved inland with their families each winter to take part in the logging industry, and bad weather frequently kept students at home. Poverty was another major problem for families who could not afford school fees or adequate clothing for their children.

The Newfoundland School Society and Robert Dyer, along with his wife Elizabeth Dyer, maintained a successful elementary school in Greenspond for all boys and girls ranging in age from 3 to 16. The children at Greenspond were usually advanced in their lessons, and the school always had a large attendance. In 1844 there was an average attendance of 103 children. By May 1847, 119 girls and 110 boys were recorded on the attendance, a total of 229 students. In 1850 Robert Dyer recorded in his diary that a visiting judge, Judge Des Barres, had claimed that the school in Greenspond was the "largest in the island". In 1852 Dyer recorded an attendance of 283. Shortly after this, he made a request for an infant school, and in 1854 the number attending the infant school was 300. The Rev Vicars inspected the school on 28 August 1856 and found 109 infants under the care of a school mistress, Miss Oakley.

== Family ==
Robert Dyer left Greenspond briefly in 1845 to be married in England. He married Elizabeth Bartlett, daughter of Josiah and Sarah Ann (Hughes) Bartlett, on 15 April 1845, at St. Andrew-by-the-Wardrobe, in London. Robert and Elizabeth had five children: William Bartlett Dyer (22 July 1846), Henry Thomas Dyer (31 October 1847), Joseph Lake Dyer (23 May 1849), Louise Sarah Dyer (20 April 1851; she died and was buried on 28 June 1852, at the age of 1 year and 2 months), and Isabella Dyer (8 August 1852).

William Dyer became a teacher in Prince Edward Island, and later became a pharmacist; he moved back to England in 1909. Henry Dyer was a telegraph operator, Isabella married a John Charles Travers, and Joseph Dyer was a merchant in Prince Edward Island. Joseph's daughter, Alice Maude, was a nurse but later became the first registered female pharmacist in Prince Edward Island when she received her diploma in this field in 1928.

== Ordination ==
Robert Dyer's duties extended far beyond the classroom in Greenspond. He often visited surrounding communities, either alone, or with the resident clergyman, who, during Dyer's stay, was Rev. James Gilchrist and later, Rev. Julian Moreton. During this period, there was a severe shortage of clergymen in Newfoundland; therefore, "missions" were established, so that the clergyman in a community visited surrounding settlements regularly to hold services, baptisms, and funerals. The Greenspond Mission, which underwent several changes, generally included such settlements as Swain's Island, Pinchard's Island, Lumsden, Flowers Island. Dyer would visit these communities and inspect their schools, visit the sick, and read scriptures. Reading was extremely important during this time, as most people could not read, and if they did not have a resident clergyman, they depended on others to read and teach them the Bible. Therefore, Dyer had much experience with ministerial duties before being ordained.

In 1849, the Church of England Bishop of Newfoundland, Edward Feild, agreed to ordain Dyer. Dyer went to St. John's in May, began studying for his deacon's examinations upon his arrival, and passed all of the tests. Robert Dyer was admitted to the diaconate on 3 May 1849, and was ordained to the diaconate by Bishop Edward Feild.

== Prince Edward Island ==
A letter from the Rev. R. W. Dyer, dated 2 Nov 1852, Greenspond, Newfoundland, reported on the progress of his work at Greenspond but also expressed his desire to be removed to another colony in which the Bishop was friendly and where he might have more full exercise of his ministry. Therefore, in the spring of 1859 Robert Dyer and his family left Greenspond. On 7 July 1859, they sailed for Prince Edward Island, where he was to serve until 1884. Rev. Dyer was responsible for establishing the second Church of England parish west of St. Eleanors. For nearly 26 years he ministered to the communities of Cascumpec (later Alberton), Tignish, Kildare Capes and the surrounding areas. In the beginning his ministry took place in the homes of communicants, school houses and temperance halls, but eventually churches were built in these locations, culminating in the consecration of the original St. Peter's in Cascumpec in September 1869.

Rev. Dyer resigned in 1886 and died shortly after, on 4 February 1887.

== See also ==
- Greenspond
- Naboth Winsor
- Newfoundland School Society
