= Darius Blandford =

Newfoundland politician (1847–1917)

Darius Blandford MHA

Member of the Newfoundland House of Assembly for Bonavista Bay
- In office November 6, 1893 – October 31, 1904 Serving with Donald Morison (1893–1897); Alfred B. Morine (1893–97, 1897–1904); John Cowan (1897–1900); John A. Robinson (1897); Mark Chaplin (1900–1904)
- Preceded by: Samuel Blandford
- Succeeded by: Sidney Blandford

Personal details
- Born: c. 1847 Greenspond, Newfoundland Colony
- Died: May 29, 1917 (aged 73–74) Greenspond, Newfoundland
- Party: Conservative
- Relatives: Samuel Blandford (brother); Sidney Blandford (nephew); William C. Winsor (nephew-in-law)

Darius Blandford (c. 1847 – May 29, 1917) was a blacksmith, sealing captain and political figure in Newfoundland. He represented Bonavista Bay in the Newfoundland and Labrador House of Assembly from 1893 to 1904 as a Conservative.

He was born in Greenspond, the son of Darius Blandford. Port Blandford, was named in his honour.

His brother Samuel was also a sealing captain and served in the Newfoundland assembly.
