= Levi March =

Newfoundland politician and magistrate (1841–1933)

Levi March MHA

Member of the Newfoundland House of Assembly for Trinity Bay
- In office October 29, 1897 – 1898 Serving with Robert Bremner and Robert Watson
- Preceded by: George Gushue; William Horwood; George Johnson
- Succeeded by: John A. Robinson

Personal details
- Born: 1841 Old Perlican, Newfoundland Colony
- Died: May 7, 1933 (aged 91–92) Curling, Newfoundland
- Party: Conservative
- Relations: Stephen March; Stephen Rendell March (cousin)
- Occupation: Businessman, magistrate

Levi March (1841 – May 7, 1933) was a politician and magistrate in Newfoundland. He represented Trinity in the Newfoundland House of Assembly in 1897 as a Conservative.

March worked in the family business established by Stephen March. He was elected to the assembly in 1897 but resigned after being named stipendiary magistrate for the Bay of Islands. March retired from that post in 1919. He died at Curling in 1933.
