= Samuel Blandford =

Newfoundland politician and sealing captain (1840–1909)

The Honourable Captain Samuel Blandford
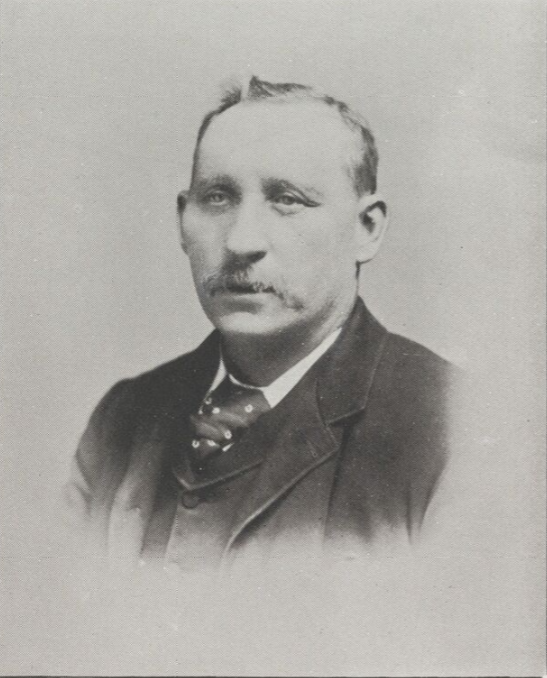

Member of the Newfoundland House of Assembly for Bonavista Bay
- In office November 6, 1889 – November 6, 1893 Serving with Donald Morison and Alfred B. Morine
- Preceded by: Abram Kean; Frederick White
- Succeeded by: Darius Blandford

Personal details
- Born: August 10, 1840 Greenspond, Newfoundland Colony
- Died: March 8, 1909 (aged 68) St. John's, Newfoundland
- Spouse: Sarah A. Edgar
- Relatives: Sidney Blandford (son); Darius Blandford (brother); William C. Winsor (nephew-in-law)

Samuel Blandford (August 10, 1840 – March 8, 1909) was a sealing captain and political figure in the Newfoundland Colony. He represented Bonavista Bay in the Newfoundland and Labrador House of Assembly from 1889 to 1893 as a Liberal.

He was born in Greenspond, the son of Darius Blandford. He first took part in the seal fishery with his father at the age of 13. In 1874, he was named captain of the steamship Osprey, which was lost in April of that year. Blandford married Sarah A. Edgar. He also managed a cod fishing operation on the Labrador coast and was captain of a ship providing mail service from 1875 to 1883. In 1893, he was named to the Legislative Council of Newfoundland and served until his death in St. John's at the age of 68.

Blandford's son Sidney also entered politics. His brother Darius represented Bonavista Bay from 1893 to 1904 as a Conservative. His niece Josephine married William C. Winsor.
