= George W. Gushue =

Newfoundland politician (1854–1941)

The Honourable George W. Gushue MHA
- Gushue in 1902

Minister of Public Works
- In office 1900–1909
- Prime Minister: Robert Bond
- Preceded by: William Woodford
- Succeeded by: William Woodford

Member of the Newfoundland House of Assembly for Trinity Bay
- In office November 8, 1900 – May 8, 1909 Serving with William Horwood (1900–1902); George M. Johnson (1900–1902); William Warren (1902–1904); Robert Watson (1902–1904, 1908–1909); William F. Lloyd (1904–1908); Arthur W. Miller (1904–1909)
- Preceded by: Robert S. Bremner; John A. Robinson; Robert Watson
- Succeeded by: Edwin Grant; Richard Squires
- In office October 16, 1894 – October 28, 1897 Serving with William Horwood and George M. Johnson
- Preceded by: Robert Bond; James H. Watson; William Whiteway
- Succeeded by: Robert S. Bremner; Levi March; Robert Watson

Personal details
- Born: George William Gushue; May 8, 1854 Brigus, Newfoundland Colony
- Died: October 5, 1941 (aged 87) St. John's, Newfoundland
- Party: Liberal

George William Gushue (May 8, 1854 – October 5, 1941) was a politician in Newfoundland. He represented Trinity in the Newfoundland House of Assembly from 1894 to 1897 and from 1900 to 1909.

== Political career ==
Gushue was elected to the Newfoundland assembly in an 1894 by-election but was defeated when he ran for reelection in 1897. Gushue was reelected in 1900, 1904 and 1908. From 1900 to 1907, he served as Minister of Public Works, but was not a member of the cabinet. He was defeated when he ran for reelection in 1909. After leaving politics, he was manager of the stationery department at the Reid Newfoundland Company.

== Legacy ==
Gushue's Bridge in Georgetown was named in his honour and some sources say that Georgetown was also named after him.
