= Donald Morison =

Newfoundland lawyer, judge and politician (1857–1924)

The Honourable Donald Morison MHA
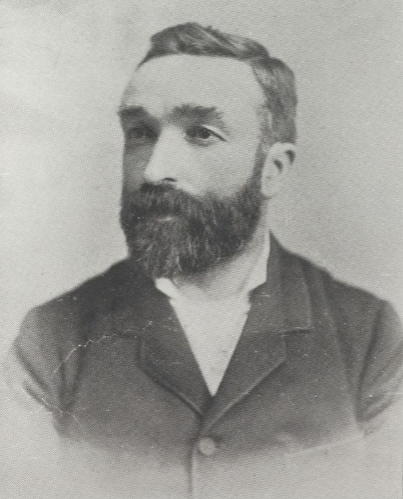
- Morison in 1894

Minister of Justice
- In office 1909 – October 30, 1913
- Prime Minister: Edward Morris
- Preceded by: James M. Kent
- Succeeded by: Richard Squires

Attorney General
- In office April 1894 – December 10, 1894
- Premier: Augustus F. Goodridge
- Preceded by: William Whiteway
- Succeeded by: William Whiteway

Member of the Newfoundland House of Assembly for Bonavista Bay
- In office November 6, 1906 – October 30, 1913 Serving with Sydney Blandford (1906–1913); Mark Chaplin (1906–1908); William C. Winsor (1908–1913)
- Preceded by: Alfred B. Morine
- Succeeded by: John Abbott; William Coaker; Robert G. Winsor
- In office November 10, 1888 – October 28, 1897 Serving with Alfred B. Morine (1888–1897); Frederick White (1888–1889); Samuel Blandford (1889–1893); Darius Blandford (1893–1897)
- Preceded by: Abram Kean
- Succeeded by: John Cowan; John A. Robinson

Personal details
- Born: April 22, 1857 St. John's, Newfoundland Colony
- Died: April 24, 1924 (aged 67) Hollywood, California, U.S.
- Party: Conservative (1889–1908); People's (1908–1913)
- Spouse: Cassie Trapnell
- Occupation: Lawyer

Donald Morison (April 22, 1857 – April 24, 1924) was a Newfoundland lawyer, judge and politician. He represented Bonavista in the Newfoundland House of Assembly from 1888 to 1897 and from 1906 to 1913.

The son of William D. Morison and Bessie Whithall, he was born in St. John's and was educated at the General Protestant Academy there. Morison articled with James S. Winter and was called to the bar in 1881, becoming Winter's partner. He married Cassie Trapnell. He was first elected to the Newfoundland assembly in an 1888 by-election, the first election in the colony to make use of a secret ballot. Morrison served in the Executive Council as Attorney General. He was a member of the municipal council for St. John's from 1892 to 1896. He did not run for re-election to the assembly in 1897. Morrison was a justice of the Supreme Court of Newfoundland from 1898 to 1904.

He resigned from the bench in 1904 to re-enter politics. He ran unsuccessfully for a seat in the assembly as a co-leader of the United Opposition Party but was subsequently elected in a 1906 by-election. He joined Edward P. Morris's People's Party in 1908. He was named Minister of Justice in Morris' Executive Council in 1909. Morison was defeated when he ran for re-election in 1913. He retired from politics and returned to the practice of law.

Morrison convinced the cabinet to pass the Law Society Act, which allowed women to become lawyers, in 1911 after his niece Janet Morison Miller was not allowed to write her examinations by the law society. Miller moved to Scotland before she was able to take the examination but Louise Saunders later became the first woman called to the Newfoundland bar.

Morison served as provincial Grand Master for the Orange Order.

He died in Hollywood while visiting one of his sons.
