= John A. Robinson =

Scottish-born Newfoundland politician (1867–1929)

The Honourable John A. Robinson MHA MLC

Minister without portfolio
- In office 1924–1928
- Prime Minister: Walter S. Monroe

Minister of Posts and Telegraphs Postmaster General (1914–1916)
- In office 1914–1919
- Prime Minister: Edward Morris; William F. Lloyd; Michael Cashin
- Preceded by: Henry J. B. Woods (as Postmaster General)
- Succeeded by: William Halfyard

Colonial Secretary
- In office October 28, 1897 – March 15, 1900
- Premier: James S. Winter
- Preceded by: Robert Bond
- Succeeded by: Robert Bond
Legislative offices
Member of the Legislative Council of Newfoundland
In office March 24, 1925 – April 17, 1929
Nominated by	Walter S. Monroe
Appointed by	William Allardyce
In office 1909–1919
Nominated by	Edward Morris
Appointed by	Ralph Champneys Williams
In office November 17, 1897 – April 28, 1898
Nominated by	James S. Winter
Appointed by	Herbert Harley Murray
Member of the Newfoundland House of Assembly for Trinity Bay
In office April 28, 1898 – November 8, 1900 Serving with Robert S. Bremner and Robert Watson
Preceded by	Levi March
Succeeded by	George W. Gushue; William Horwood; George M. Johnson
Member of the Newfoundland House of Assembly for Bonavista Bay
In office October 28, 1897 – November 17, 1897 Serving with Darius Blandford and John Cowan
Preceded by	Alfred B. Morine; Donald Morison
Succeeded by	Alfred B. Morine

Personal details
- Born: John Alexander Robinson; June 29, 1867 Glasgow, Scotland
- Died: April 7, 1929 (aged 61) St. John's, Newfoundland
- Party: Conservative (1897–1908); People's (1908–1919); Liberal-Conservative Progressive (1924–1929)
- Spouse: Flora Taylor (m. 1893)
- Occupation: School teacher, newspaper editor

John Alexander Robinson (June 29, 1867 – April 7, 1929) was a Scottish-born educator, journalist and political figure in Newfoundland. He represented Trinity Bay in the Newfoundland and Labrador House of Assembly from 1898 to 1900.

== Early life and career ==
Robinson was born in Glasgow and came to Newfoundland in 1882. For a time, Robinson was a grammar school principal in Carbonear. He founded the Newfoundland Teachers' Association and served as its president. Robinson was founder and editor of the St. John's Daily News. In 1883, Robinson married Flora Taylor.

== Politics ==
Robinson served in the Legislative Council of Newfoundland from 1897 to 1898, from 1909 to 1919 and from 1926 to 1929. He was a member of the Executive Council serving as colonial secretary from 1898 to 1900, as Minister of Posts and Telegraphs from 1916 to 1919 and as a minister without portfolio in 1924 and 1928. Robinson was defeated when he ran for election to the Newfoundland assembly in 1900, 1904 and 1908 running as a Conservative and then as a member of the Newfoundland People's Party.
