= Sidney Dara Blandford =

Newfoundland politician (1868–1929)

The Honourable Sidney Blandford MHA

Member of the Newfoundland House of Assembly for Bonavista Bay
- In office October 31, 1904 – October 30, 1913 Serving with Alfred B. Morine (1904–1906); Mark Chaplin (1904–1908); Donald Morison (1906–1913); William C. Winsor (1908–1913)
- Preceded by: Darius Blandford
- Succeeded by: William Coaker; Robert G. Winsor; John Abbott

Personal details
- Born: June 12, 1868 Greenspond, Newfoundland Colony
- Died: November 28, 1929 (aged 61) St. John's, Newfoundland
- Party: Conservative (1904–1908); People's (1908–1913)
- Parent: Samuel Blandford (father)
- Relatives: Darius Blandford (uncle); William C. Winsor (cousin-in-law)
- Occupation: Lawyer

Sidney Dara Blandford (June 12, 1868 – November 28, 1929) was a lawyer and political figure in Newfoundland. He represented Bonavista in the Legislative Assembly of Newfoundland and Labrador from 1904 to 1913 as a Conservative and then as a member of the People's Party. His first name appears in some sources as Sydney.

He was born in Greenspond, the son of Samuel Blandford. He was educated in St. John's and practised law there. He served in the Executive Council as Minister of Agriculture and Mines. Blandford was defeated when he ran for reelection in 1913. He was named to the Legislative Council of Newfoundland in the same year, serving until 1917, when he was named High Sheriff. Blandford was one of the founding owners of the Newfoundland Hotel in St. John's.

His uncle Darius Blandford also served in the Newfoundland assembly.
