= Mark Chaplin =

Newfoundland politician (1855–1928)

Mark Chaplin MHA
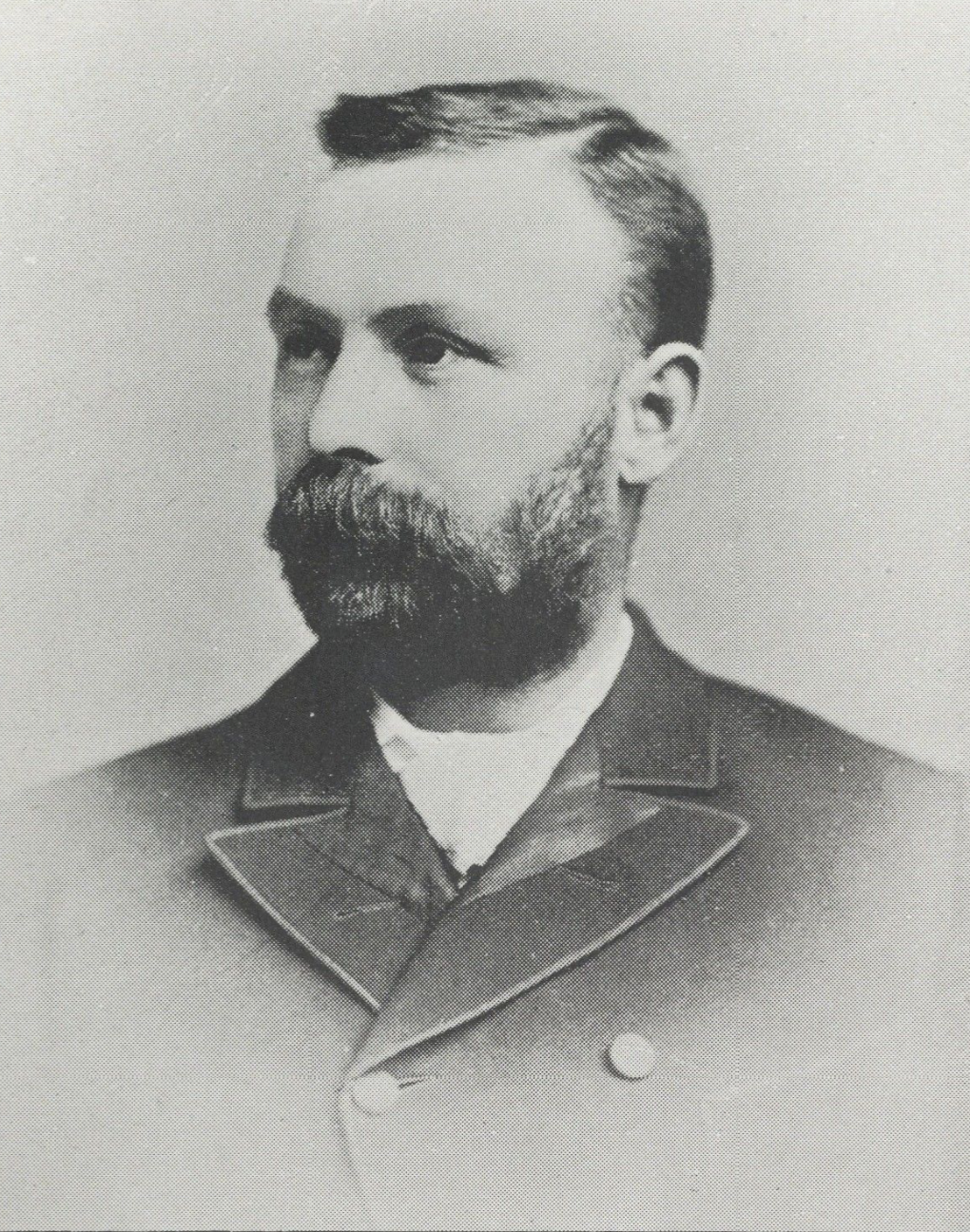
- Chaplin in 1894

Member of the Newfoundland House of Assembly for Bonavista Bay
- In office November 8, 1900 – November 2, 1908 Serving with Darius Blandford (1900–1904); Alfred B. Morine (1900–1906); Sydney Blandford (1904–1908); Donald Morison (1906–1908)
- Preceded by: John Cowan
- Succeeded by: William C. Winsor

Personal details
- Born: December 22, 1855 St. John's, Newfoundland Colony
- Died: June 14, 1928 (aged 72) St. John's, Newfoundland
- Party: Conservative
- Spouse: Amelia Jane Bowden
- Occupation: Tailor

Mark Chaplin, Jr. (December 22, 1855 – June 14, 1928) was a tailor and politician in Newfoundland. He represented Bonavista in the Newfoundland House of Assembly from 1900 to 1908.

The son of Mark Chaplin, he was born on December 22, 1855 in St. John's and was educated at Fort Townshend School. He apprenticed as a tailor and set up his own business in 1875. Elected to the Newfoundland assembly in 1900 and 1904, Chaplin did not run for reelection in 1908. Chaplin became the first elected president of the Masonic Club in 1896. From 1895 to 1920, he was president of the Newfoundland Football League, a soccer league.

Chaplin advertised himself as the "King of Tailors".
