= Stella Burry =

Canadian community worker

Personal details
- Born: 11 August 1897 Greenspond, Newfoundland Colony
- Died: 1991 (aged 93–94)
- Occupation: Teacher, community worker

Stella Burry (1897–1991), also known as Stella Anne Burrey, was a Canadian community worker and volunteer.

== Early life and education ==
Stella Burry was born on 11 August 1897 in Greenspond, Bonavista Bay, Newfoundland Colony. Her father was a fisherman. She was encouraged by her mother to study. She started teaching at the age of 17, and spent some time in Memorial college in order to become a teacher, but the poverty she observed led her to reconsider her career.

In 1923 she moved to Toronto to attend the Methodist Training School (now the Centre for Christian Studies), where she trained to become a deaconess, majoring in social work. She also studied at Victoria University, Toronto.

While in her second year of study, she realized that what people living in poverty needed was not charity, but opportunities to realise their potential.

== Career ==
Burry spent fourteen years in Toronto engaged in church work. She was elected president of the Deaconess Association of the United Church of Canada in 1934. In 1937, she was persuaded by Rev. Oliver Jackson, Superintendent of Home Missions for Newfoundland, to work in Newfoundland. In 1938, she established her office in the Old Star Building in St John's, and founded the United Church Community Service Centre (originally Emmanuel House), now Stella Burry Community Services Centre. She remained its director until 1966. She helped establish the Agnes Pratt Home for Senior Citizens in St. John's. She continued doing voluntary work during her retirement.

She never married and died in 1991 at the age of 94 years.

== Recognition ==
In 1967, Burry was named the St. John's City Council Citizen of the Year. In 1971, the Pine Hill Divinity Hall, Halifax, awarded her an honorary Doctor of Divinity degree. The community service centre she founded was renamed the Stella Burry Community Services Centre, and the United Church youth camp she founded in 1942 was named Burry Heights in her honour.
