= William C. Winsor =

Newfoundland politician (1876–1963)

The Honourable Captain William C. Winsor MHA
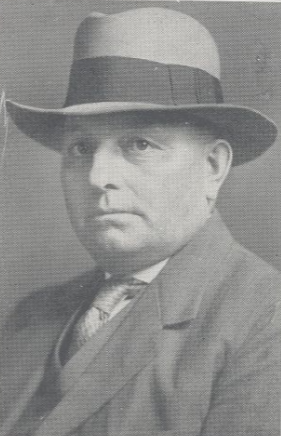

Minister of Posts and Telegraphs
- In office 1932–1934
- Prime Minister: Frederick C. Alderdice
- Preceded by: William Woodford
- Succeeded by: Thomas Lodge (as Commissioner of Public Utilties)

Minister of Marine and Fisheries
- In office 1924–1928
- Prime Minister: Walter Monroe
- Preceded by: George F. Grimes
- Succeeded by: H. B. C. Lake
Legislative offices
Member of the Newfoundland House of Assembly for Bonavista North
In office June 11, 1932 – February 16, 1934
Preceded by	Nathan G. Winsor
Succeeded by	Joey Smallwood (post-Confederation)
Member of the Newfoundland House of Assembly for Bonavista Bay
In office June 2, 1924 – October 29, 1928 Serving with Walter Monroe and Lewis Little
Preceded by	William Coaker; Robert G. Winsor; John Abbott
Succeeded by	District abolished
In office November 2, 1908 – October 30, 1913 Serving with Sydney Blandford and Donald Morison
Preceded by	Mark Chaplin
Succeeded by	William Coaker; Robert G. Winsor; John Abbott
Member of the Newfoundland House of Assembly for Bay de Verde
In office October 31, 1904 – November 2, 1908 Serving with Charles H. Hutchings
Preceded by	Isaac Mercer; Michael T. Knight
Succeeded by	John Chalker Crosbie; Jesse Whiteway

Personal details
- Born: September 12, 1876 Swain's Island, Newfoundland Colony
- Died: May 7, 1963 (aged 86) St. John's, Newfoundland, Canada
- Party: People's (1908–1913); Liberal-Progressive Conservative (1924–1932); United Newfoundland (1932–1934)
- Spouse: Josephine Blandford (m. 1902)
- Children: 8
- Relatives: Jesse Whiteway (uncle); William Tuff Whiteway (uncle); Samuel Blandford (uncle-in-law)
- Occupation: Schooner captain

William Charles Winsor (September 12, 1876 – May 7, 1963) was a Newfoundland mariner and politician. He represented Bay de Verde from 1904 to 1908, Bonavista Bay from 1908 to 1913 and from 1924 to 1928 and Bonavista North from 1932 to 1934 in the Newfoundland and Labrador House of Assembly.

He was born in Swain's Island on Bonavista Bay, the son of William Winsor and Emma Whiteway, and was educated in Wesleyville. Winsor married Josephine, the daughter of Samuel Blandford. He commanded schooners employed in the Labrador and seal fisheries. Winsor was defeated when he ran for reelection in 1913, 1919, 1923 and 1928. He served in the Executive Council as Minister of Marine and Fisheries and then again later as Minister of Posts and Telegraphs. After leaving politics, Winsor continued to work as a mariner until the age of 77. He died in St. John's at the age of 86.
