= Swain's Island (Newfoundland and Labrador) =

Island group in Newfoundland and Labrador, Canada

Coordinates: 49°08′22″N 53°32′46″W

Swain's Island, Newfoundland, is actually a group of eight islands on the north side of Bonavista Bay, southeast of Wesleyville. All of these islands once had inhabitants but eventually all of them were resettled, mostly to Wesleyville.

== History ==
The earliest parts of Swain's Island to be settled were the Outer Swain's Islands, which were close to good fishing grounds and provided excellent shelter for vessels. The first settlers were two Englishmen, William Tiller and John Winsor, who arrived in 1810. Other families soon followed, including the Brentons, Mulletts, Stockleys, Dykes, and Hills. By 1836, the islands had 85 inhabitants among them, and a Church of England school-chapel had been built on one of them — Hill's Island. By the 1860s, Swain's Island was prospering: It had a successful inshore fishery; it participated in the Labrador fishery; and residents had begun to participate in the seal hunt.

By 1869 the population had reached 265, and it stayed stable for a few years, but after that people began moving to the mainland, and to places like Wesleyville. In 1896, Swain’s Island was unable to find a schoolteacher willing to teach there, and so a ferry service was established to take children to attend school in Wesleyville. By 1930, the islands had been completely abandoned.

== Church history ==
When Swain's Island was first settled, the entire population belonged to the Church of England. Swain's Island was often visited by missionaries from Greenspond. For example, the Rev. N. A. Coster visited in June 1830 and baptized over 40 people Robert Dyer and Julian Moreton described their visits to Swain's Island in their diaries and reports. The first record of a layreader, and also of a teacher, was a Mr. E Churnside Bishop, who began teaching and layreading on the island in 1843. Bishop also helped organize the building of a new school which was opened in 1848. A Church of England church was built on Swain's Island and was consecrated in 1861.

== Education history ==
The first teaching done on the islands was by a fisherman, John Feltham, who was asked by William Tiller to stay ashore rather than fish to teach his boys. Feltham agreed to this, and sometime later, in 1829, he was appointed by the Society for the Propagation of the Gospel in Foreign Parts (S.P.G.), to be a teacher. In 1830 there were about 25 students, but this school was discontinued in 1834. The next record of school was by the teacher Edward Churnside Bishop under the Newfoundland School Society from 1843 to 1883. In 1869 a new school house was built; and the last teacher to teach at Swain's Island was Annie Alice Hall in 1901.

== Fishery ==
Swain's Island was settled because of its prime location and advantages in the various fisheries. Its entire economy, like so many other communities in Newfoundland at this time, depended upon the fisheries. In 1874 there was a peak number of fishing rooms on Swain's Island, totalling 19 altogether, in 1884 there were still 10 fishing rooms in use.

Some of the vessels in the cod fishery on Swain's Island:

- Five Brothers, 1840
- R.M.C.
- True Blue, 1853
- Caroline
- Meteor
- British Queen, 1842
- Oban, 1863

Sealing nets and boats on Swain's Island:

	1836	1845	1857	1869
Sealing nets		82	130	78
Large boats for sealing	4	5	9	4

Sealing steamer captains born on Swain's Island:

- William Winsor, Sr. Some of his steamers include the Iceland, 1889; and the Vanguard
- George Hann, his first steamer was the Leopard in 1890, and last was the Labrador, in 1908
- Edward Bishop, some of his steamers were the Algerine and Eagle II
- Jesse Winsor, his first steamer was the Panther in 1906; his last was the Ranger, 1920
- Samuel Winsor, his first was the Walrus, 1904 and his last was the Ranger in 1920.

== Census Information ==
	1836	1845	1869	1857	1874
population	85	103	265	171	354
inhabited houses	8	8	34	17	35
families	-	-	44	27	54
Church of England	85	103	251	170	161
Wesleyan/Methodist	-	-	14	-	190
Catholics	-	-	-	1	3
# of students	-	40	34	42	27
can read/write	-	-	101	-	148
people catching/curing fish	-	-	80	140	167
seamen/fishermen	-	-	-	49	56
total boats	7	7	8	20	12
boats/vessels built	-	-	-	2	
sealing vessels	-	2	10	4	12
men on board	-	-	135	138	85
tonnage	-	86	350	382	388
nets/seines	-	5	73	27	86
sealing nets	-	82	78	130	59
seals caught	-	-	-	2669	1654
cod fish cured (qtls)	-	-	-	3800	4550
herring (Bls)	-	-	-	50	-
oil produced (gals)	-	-	-	13 tuns	2750
fishing rooms in use	-	-	15	11	19
stores/barns/outhouses	-	-	17	14	18
barrels of potatoes produced	504(busl)	102	310	190	446
barrels of turnip	-	-	15	16	30
tons of hay	-	1/4	-	-	-
cows/oxen	-	-	2	-	-
sheep/swine/goats	-	-	32	21	68

== Directories ==
Hutchinson's Directory of 1864 lists four residents of Swain's Island:[5]

- Bishop, Edward C. – Teacher
- Tiller, John – Planter
- Windsor, David – Planter
- Samuel Windsor – Planter and Shipowner

Lovell's Directory for 1871 describes Swain's Island as an island on the north side of Bonavista Bay with a fine harbour but difficult to access. It is distant from Greenspond by 6 miles in boat and has a population of 265.[6]

- Ayles, John – Fisherman
- Best, Charles – Planter
- Bishop, Edward – Planter
- Breaker, James – Fisherman
- Brenton, Thomas
- Broobcomb, Robert – Fisherman
- Carter, Benjamin – Planter
- Carter, John – Fisherman
- Cross, Thomas – Fisherman
- Dicks, John – Fisherman
- Fifreld, Thomas – Fisherman
- Force, James – Fisherman
- Hawkers, John
- Hill, James – Planter
- Hoyles, Joseph – Fisherman
- Mullett, Abraham – Fisherman
- Mullett, George – Fisherman
- Mullett, Thomas – Fisherman
- Mullett, William – Fisherman
- Norris, Abraham – Fisherman
- Paine, Charles – Planter
- Samsbury, Japhet – Fisherman
- Stanford, Benjamin – Fisherman
- Stockly, George – Fisherman
- Stockly, James – Fisherman
- Tiller, John Sr. – Planter
- Tiller, Joseph – Fisherman
- Tiller, William – Fisherman
- Wicks, Samuel – Fisherman
- Winsor, George – Planter
- Winsor, James – Fisherman
- Winsor, John – Fisherman
- Winsor, Samuel – Planter

== See also ==
- List of communities in Newfoundland and Labrador
- Field, Edward. A journal of the Bishop’s visitation of the missions of the northern coast, in the summer of 1846. London: Society for the Propagation of the Gospel, 1856
- Moreton, Julian. Life and Work in Newfoundland: reminiscences of thirteen years spent there. London: Rivingtons, 1863
- Prowse, D.W. A History of Newfoundland. London: MacMillan and Co., 1895
