= Louise Saunders =

Canadian lawyer

Louise Saunders (1893–1969) was a lawyer who was called to the bar in 1933 and went on to become the first woman lawyer in Newfoundland. She began her career as a legal secretary in the office of Richard Squires who was Prime Minister of Newfoundland during the 1920s.

Saunders was born in Greenspond and died in St. John's.

== See also ==
- First woman lawyers around the world
