= Julian Moreton =

The Reverend Julian Moreton (1825–1900) was a Church of England (Anglican) clergyman and author who travelled from England to Newfoundland, Canada to be ordained as a missionary for the Society for the Propagation of the Gospel in Foreign Parts. He stayed for thirteen years, kept a detailed journal, and wrote a book, entitled "Life and work in Newfoundland: reminiscences of thirteen years spent there".

== Early life ==
There is not much information on Julian Moreton's early life except that he was born on 29 August 1825 in Chelsea, London, England. While there he was a clerk for a barrister (lawyer), and was attracted to and influenced by the Tractarian Movement, also known as the Oxford Movement and wished to become an Anglican Priest, an ambition difficult to satisfy for one of his low social status. In June 1855, Moreton married Georgine McKenzie.

== Training ==
Moreton could not become an Anglican priest in England, therefore, around the year 1847 he applied to become a missionary. A year later, in 1848, the Bishop of Newfoundland, Edward Feild, accepted Moreton who was recommended by a friend of Feild a prominent High Church clergyman, William Scott of Hoxton.

When Julian Moreton arrived on the Island, he received a year of training at the Theological Institute located in St. John's, Newfoundland, the capital of Newfoundland. In 1849 he was ordained a deacon on Trinity Sunday at St. Thomas's Church in St. John's. A year later, on 22 September 1850, he was ordained a Priest at the Cathedral of St. John the Baptist in St. John's.

== Greenspond mission ==
In 1849 Julian Moreton was stationed at Greenspond, Newfoundland, Bonavista Bay with financial backing from the Society for the Propagation of the Gospel in Foreign Parts (S.P.G.). The Greenspond Mission was a very difficult area as it covered seventy miles of coast, 23 distinct settlements which had to be reached by boat, and more than 3,200 members of the Church. Although Moreton wanted to leave the mission in 1855, he decided to stay and just shortly after volunteered to have the S.P.G. stop providing him with payments as he could survive on payments made by the inhabitants. Bishop Feild was very pleased with his work.

Moreton gave several lectures when he returned to England, which were published in 1863 under the title Life and work in Newfoundland; reminiscences of thirteen years spent there (London). The book gives a detailed account of his life as a missionary as well as valuable descriptions of society in Newfoundland outports during that time. The people of Greenspond had built a church and afterwards voted as to whether it should be Methodist or Anglican. Moreton was constantly on the move. He describes visiting settlements during the winter, when the fishermen lived in tilts in the woods, and he often slept on logs near the fire. He raised money to build a new church on Pinchard's Island and to pay lay readers in the mission. He often wrote letters for the illiterate, who made up the great majority of his parishioners: he records that “of 334 persons married in seven years previous to September, 1856, only 49 could write their names.” Apart from the merchants’ agents, the collector of customs, the doctor, and the schoolmaster, the inhabitants of the Greenspond area were fishermen. Most were of English origin, settlers or descendants of settlers from Hampshire and Dorset.

Julian Moreton faced many hardships and obstacles during his time as missionary in the Greenspond Mission. These hardships are recorded in Moreton's book and in Bishop Edward Feild's reports to the S.P.G. For example, one account records Moreton visiting Deadman's Bay some 30 miles away from his home, walking for 16 miles along the shore, living on bread and butter with salted fish alone, and expecting only two good meals in nine days. This life eventually proved too difficult for Moreton, who suffered a complete breakdown in his health.

== England ==
In 1860, while failing in health, Moreton was transferred to the Island Cove/Bishop's Cove Mission in Conception Bay for his final year in Newfoundland. The following year, after returning to England he began serving as Chaplain to colonial governors, first at Labuan (Malaysia) and then Penang. In 1874 he secured a curacy in England and eventually ended his ministry as vicar of the parish of Saltash. In his retirement Moreton continued to write and lecture on Anglo Catholic topics, often referring to his experiences in Newfoundland and quoting Bishop Feild. Moreton died at his home in Springfield Gardens, Upper Clapton, on 16 December 1900. He was 76 years old. He was perhaps the first Anglo-Catholic clergyman to minister in Newfoundland and is remembered to this day by the Guild of All Souls, at the Shrine of Our Lady of Walsingham.

== Works ==
Life and work in Newfoundland: reminiscences of thirteen years spent there (London, Rivingtons, 1863)

A letter to the Rev. H. Bailey, in reply to recent strictures upon missionary societies and the missionaries (Oxford, 1864)

Ritual in worship: now and hereafter (London, 1888)

Some Account of the Physical Geography of Newfoundland, Journal of the Royal Geographical Society of London, 1864.

Some thoughts on marriage (London, 1891)

What is the characteristic grace of confirmation? A treatise on the operation of the Holy Ghost in confirmation, with a scheme of instruction (London, 1890).

== See also ==
- Naboth Winsor
- List of communities in Newfoundland and Labrador
- Greenspond
- Robert Dyer (clergyman)
