= Robert G. Winsor =

Newfoundland politician (1876–1929)

Robert G. Winsor MHA

Member of the Newfoundland House of Assembly for Bonavista North
- In office October 29, 1928 – June 1, 1929
- Preceded by: District established
- Succeeded by: Nathan G. Winsor

Member of the Newfoundland House of Assembly for Bonavista Bay
- In office November 3, 1913 – June 2, 1924 Serving with William Coaker and John Abbott
- Preceded by: Sydney Blandford; William C. Winsor; Donald Morison
- Succeeded by: Walter Monroe; Lewis Little; William C. Winsor

Personal details
- Born: May 26, 1876 Swain's Island, Newfoundland Colony
- Died: June 1, 1929 (aged 53) St. John's, Newfoundland
- Party: Fishermen's Protective Union
- Spouse: Alice Whiteway (m. 1903)
- Occupation: Schooner captain

Robert George Winsor (May 26, 1876 – June 1, 1929) was a Newfoundland fisherman and politician. He represented Bonavista Bay from 1913 to 1924 and Bonavista North from 1928 to 1929 in the Newfoundland House of Assembly as a member of the Fishermen's Protective Union (FPU)

Winsor was born in Wesleyville, the son of George Winsor. He ended his schooling at the age of twelve to become a fisherman, later becoming captain of a schooner working in the Labrador fishery. He served as chairman of the FPU council in Wesleyville and for the Bonavista district. Winsor married Alice Whiteway in 1903. He was manager of the Union Trading Company at Newtown from 1912 to 1919. In 1919, he opened his own business, including a sawmill, near Wesleyville. Winsor retired from politics in 1924, but ran unsuccessfully in a 1924 by-election held after two elected representatives for Bonavista Bay were named to the Executive Council. Winsor was elected again in 1928, defeating William C. Winsor. He died in office in St. John's the following year.
