= Gordon Rodgers =

Canadian writer (born 1952)

Gordon Rodgers (born 1952 in Gander, Newfoundland) is a Canadian writer.

== Biography ==
Rodgers is the author of two books of poetry: Floating Houses (1984), and The Pyrate Latitudes (1986), as well as a novella entitled The Phoenix (1985). In 1999, he released his first novel, A Settlement of Memory, which is loosely based on the life of William Coaker. He obtained his MFA in Creative Writing from the University of British Columbia, and an MSc from Memorial University of Newfoundland.

He was a clinical psychologist, (retired 2016) and was a part-time lecturer with the Faculty of Medicine of Memorial University of Newfoundland.

== Personal ==
Rodgers lives in Paradise, Newfoundland and Labrador, with his wife Paula, and is working on his second novel.

He has two sons, David, a lawyer in St. John’s, NL and Christopher, a computer engineer in St. John’s.
