= Lewis Little =

Newfoundland politician

Lewis Little MHA

Member of the Newfoundland House of Assembly for Bonavista
- In office 2 June 1924 – 29 October 1928 Serving with Walter Monroe and William C. Winsor
- Preceded by: William Coaker; Robert G. Winsor; John Abbott
- Succeeded by: District abolished

Personal details
- Born: James Lewis Little; 1871 Bonavista, Newfoundland Colony
- Died: February 25, 1967 (aged 95–96) Bonavista, Newfoundland, Canada
- Party: Liberal-Progressive
- Spouse: Mary Butler
- Occupation: Fisherman

James Lewis Little (1871 – February 25, 1967) was a schooner captain and politician in Newfoundland. He represented Bonavista in the Newfoundland House of Assembly from 1924 to 1928.

He was born and was educated in Bonavista. Little married Mary Butler. He worked in the Labrador fishery. He was elected to the Newfoundland assembly in 1924 as a Liberal-Conservative. With two other members of Walter S. Monroe's caucus, Little joined the opposition in 1926 to protest the government's policies. He did not run for reelection in 1928. Little served on the 1936 Seafisheries Commission which published its report in 1937.

Little was honoured by the King of Norway, the Royal Humane Society and the Carnegie Commission for rescuing Norwegian mariners from the wreck of the Snorre in 1907. The Snorre had been anchored in Bonavista harbour but was set adrift after its anchor chains snapped in a storm and crashed into the rocks at Canaille Point. Little swam into the raging sea to save a sailor who had lost his grip on a rescue line. He had also come to the rescue of other ships in distress.

Little died in Bonavista in 1967.
