= Newfoundland School Society =

The Newfoundland School Society (N.S.S) was established on June 30, 1823, by a merchant named Samuel Codner. Codner first came to Newfoundland in 1788 and periodically traveled back to England where he was influenced by the Evangelical Revival occurring there during this time. He was inspired to help Christians in neglected British colonies by the Premier of England, Lord Liverpool in 1821. Knowing the dire conditions in Newfoundland, he formed The Society for Educating the Poor of Newfoundland which had its first annual meeting at the London Coffee House on July 13, 1824. It was the ability of the N.S.S. to deal with the difficult conditions in Newfoundland that led to their great success on the Island. The first N.S.S. school was set up in St. John's in 1823 and within two years, the demand spread rapidly to rural Newfoundland where petitions and applications for schools began pouring out. By 1825, five schoolmasters had been sent between St. John’s, Quidi Vidi, Harbour Grace, Carbonear, and Petty Harbour. Within just ten years, 43 N.S.S. schools had been established on the Island, with an enrolment of approximately 6945 children in daily schools and 4714 in Sunday schools. The N.S.S. began to dissipate in the late 19th century when Newfoundland Legislature established an Education Board and set up Board Schools across the Island, and especially after the Education Act of 1891. In 1923, what still existed as the N.S.S. merged into a denominational school system known as the Church of England schools.

== Education in Newfoundland ==
Public education in Newfoundland and Labrador, since the early 19th century, has largely been shaped by two factors: religion and the economy. The economy was based on a single industry, the fishery; the Protestant and Catholic churches, from 1843 onwards, dominated the educational system. Many of the independent schools before 1843, such as the St. John's Charity School, the Orphan Asylum School, various classical academies and the schools of the N.S.S., had claimed to be non-denominational. They accepted and taught children of all religions; yet there was an obvious bias towards certain denominations. The schools of the public education system put in place by the first Education Act in 1836 also opened their doors to children of all religions, (namely Roman Catholic and Church of England).

== Naming ==
The N.S.S. experienced many name changes, such as the Newfoundland and British North American Society for Educating the Poor, this name change came in May 1829 to reflect the wider vision of the Society, moving beyond Newfoundland into the rest of the Canadian and North American colonies. Also, in July 1846 they changed their name to the Church of England Society for educating the Poor of Newfoundland and the Colonies because the Society became an official educational agency of the colonial church. The Society had been established to provide education, but from its origin it also participated in general missionary opportunities. For example, the N.S.S. also assisted the local Anglican community by ordaining many of its most qualified teachers as deacons, thereby satisfying an urgent need for local clergy as well as for local educators. This was the case with Robert Dyer, who served both as teacher and deacon while at Greenspond. The Society acknowledged that one of its primary aims, despite its non-denominational constitution, was to carry the ministry of the Church to isolated areas which could not afford to support a clergyman. In 1851 the Society amalgamated with the Colonial Church Society to become the Colonial Church and School Society. The name was changed yet again in 1861 to the Colonial and Continental Church Society. In 1994 the Society continued under the name of the International Church Society, but did not have direct responsibility for Newfoundland schools since the passing of the Education Act of 1891.

== Samuel Codner ==
Samuel Codner was from Kingskerswell, Devon, in a region with a long-standing tradition of involvement in the Newfoundland cod fishery. At the age of 12 he began a seafaring career by joining his father, uncle, and two brothers at St. John's. Codner rose quickly to the rank of ship's captain and by 1794 he was acting as agent in St John's for Daniel Codner and Company. Even though Codner's firm was one of St John's leading mercantile establishments for more than thirty years, he made his mark in Newfoundland history by founding the Newfoundland School Society, an institution which had a profound effect on the island's educational and cultural development. In 1822, Codner, was saved from a shipwreck while sailing from St. John's to England. As thanksgiving for his deliverance, the next year he established the Newfoundland School Society (also known as the Society for Educating the Poor of Newfoundland) so that Newfoundland children would be educated and "early trained to subordination and their moral habits... greatly improved." Codner immediately set about organizing support and collecting subscriptions for schools in Newfoundland and over the next few years exerted unflagging energy to establish and diffuse the school movement. He circulated a leaflet entitled Schools in Newfoundland, which asserted that a large proportion of the 70,000 inhabitants were without access to instruction.

== Origins ==
The Newfoundland School Society was established in June 1823 and had its first annual meeting on July 13, 1824, at the London Coffee House on Ludgate Hill. Some of the rules and regulations created by the N.S.S. were that the Schools must be managed by Masters and Mistresses of the United Church of England and Ireland and conducted on Dr. Bell’s System. They believed that through their schools "we shall discharge the claims of kindred and of philanthropy, and most effectually teach them to understand and rightly appreciate their connection with, and interest in the moral, as well as national greatness of their Mother Country". The N.S.S. wanted to make the poor intelligent, grow into happy and useful people, intend that all the children of the schools should receive instruction in the Holy scriptures, one or more days/week instructed in the church catechism, and the attendance of the children be at the parents discretion. The success of the Society depended on the charity of others. For example, in 1824 the British government gave £500 for the construction of a central school in St John’s and £100 for the salary of a schoolmaster. Codner then turned to some of the most important towns and cities in England, Ireland, and Scotland, evidently at his own expense, to solicit both donations and the assistance of political and ecclesiastical leaders in founding branch societies.

== Schools ==
The Newfoundland School Society quickly and easily became the principal school society working across the Island, promoting literacy and numeracy among adults and young people alike, regardless of their denomination. The first advertisement of the Society was placed in the "Mercantile Journal" on September 16, 1824, which stated that the Society would offer non-denominational education, but that all teaching staff were required to be followers of the Church of England. The first N.S.S. school opened in St John's in September 1824 with an enrolment of 75. Just two years later a larger building was needed to accommodate the 450 students; there was a staff of three teachers and a female monitor. The children were taught reading, writing, arithmetic, sewing, knitting and net-making. By 1829 there were 8 principal schools, located in the larger settlements, ran by society teachers, recruited and trained in England; and there were 15 branch schools in smaller communities. A year later in 1830, the Society operated 28 day schools with 1513 children around the Island, along with 18 Sunday schools and 10 adult evening schools for religious instruction. By 1836, its 46 schools were located as far north as Twillingate, along the south coast, and up the west shore to St. George's Bay. By 1840 there were 52 schools, and five years later there were 3907 students. The Society underwent changes in name and mission, but was always commonly referred to as the Newfoundland School Society. The society claimed to have provided instruction for nearly 16,500 students, both children and adults, which equalled slightly less than 25 per cent of the total population.

=== Obstacles ===
Schools in Newfoundland, especially in outport settlements, faced many problems and obstacles. The success of the schools was influenced by the conditions within the settlement, and these conditions often affected student attendance, payments, learning, and so forth. For example, conditions which affected the population were such things as illnesses (or epidemics) such as the flu, fever, whooping cough, smallpox, measles, etc. The weather also posed problems, severe snowstorms in the winter months often closed schools for days; and if the weather was too cold, children could not make it to school or could not keep the school in fuel for heat. The fishery affected the school and its attendance greatly. During the fishing season, children were often needed to help out in the fishery and could not attend school. Also, in smaller settlements, the teacher was allowed to attend the fishery in order to supplement their low teaching salaries; therefore, closing the school during that season. A failure in the fishery also had severe consequences as parents could not pay subscriptions to the school. Poverty also led to a lack of clothes and shoes which meant children could not be sent to school. The N.S.S., unlike other schools, tried their best to counter these obstacles. For example, the N.S.S. would send shipments of clothes and shoes from England to Newfoundland to give to poverty-stricken families so their children could continue to attend school. Also, other schools in Newfoundland had trouble procuring and paying qualified teachers. The N.S.S., however, were able to recruite qualified teachers who were trained at the National School Society Training School in England and they were able to pay their teachers better salaries.

=== Monitorial system ===
N.S.S. schools were very successful and encountered very high enrolment numbers. They were able to educate so many children because they adopted the Dr. Bell System of teaching. This system originated in Madras, India in 1787, and it allowed older pupils to teach the younger children the lessons they had already mastered; this was very efficient as more children could be taught by one teacher. The Dr. Bell System provided tangible evidence that children were benefiting from this education as they were able to teach other children the lessons they had learnt. Therefore, parents were much more interested in supporting and sending their children to these schools because of the quality of the education. The high student enrolment proved that the N.S.S. enjoyed much success in its short existence on the island.

=== Curriculum ===
The N.S.S. selected which books they would use in their curriculum, but generally books from the "Irish National School" were used. Books were usually supplied to them through the Society for Promoting Christian Knowledge (S.P.C.K.) in England. The most important books within N.S.S. curriculum were the Old and New Testament and various spelling books and primers. The N.S.S. schools also practiced devotional singing at the beginning and end of their day with a hymn or psalm.

== Religious affiliation ==
Although the N.S.S. claimed to be interdenominational, the schools run by the Society became increasingly identified and involved with the Church of England. The Society acknowledged that one of its primary aims, despite its non-denominational constitution, was to carry the ministry of the Church to isolated areas which could not afford to support a clergyman. In 1923 they merged into a denominational school system known as the Church of England schools. The existence of the society was one of the influences in the evolution of a denominational school system in Newfoundland. The teachers sent out in the society’s early years were well trained and highly regarded as leaders within the communities in which they lived, and they usually served as catechists or lay readers as well. A considerable number later elected to become ordained as Anglican priests and furnished the Newfoundland church with one of its main sources of clerics during the 19th century. Regarding themselves as missionaries as well as pedagogues, they strove to inculcate the virtues of hard work, regular habits, sobriety, and the observance of Sunday as a day of rest.

== See also ==
- List of communities in Newfoundland and Labrador
- List of cities and towns in Newfoundland and Labrador
- Naboth Winsor
- Greenspond
