= John Cowan (Newfoundland politician) =

Newfoundland politician (1847–1927)

The Honourable John Cowan MHA
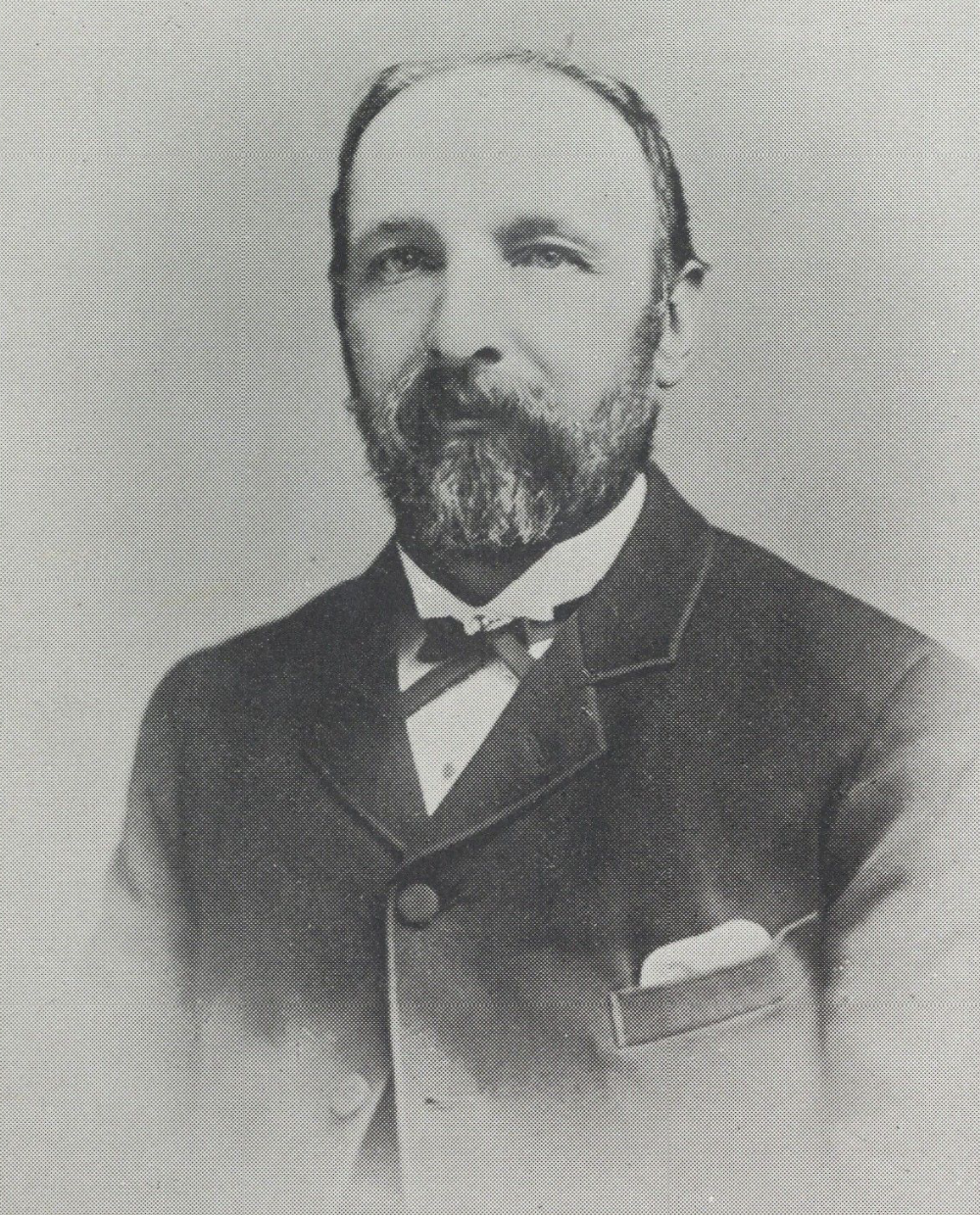
- Cowan in 1894

Minister of Finance and Customs
- In office 1900 – November 8, 1900
- Premier: Robert Bond
- Preceded by: Alan Goodridge
- Succeeded by: Edward M. Jackman

St. John's City Councillor
- In office June 26, 1906 – June 27, 1910

Member of the Newfoundland House of Assembly for Bonavista Bay
- In office October 28, 1897 – November 8, 1900 Serving with Darius Blandford (1897–1900); John A. Robinson (1897); Alfred B. Morine (1897–1900)
- Preceded by: Alfred B. Morine; Donald Morison
- Succeeded by: Mark Chaplin

Personal details
- Born: November 12, 1847 St. John's, Newfoundland Colony
- Died: March 24, 1927 (aged 79) St. John's, Newfoundland
- Party: Conservative (1897–1900); Liberal (1900)
- Spouse: Eliza Jane Earle (m. 1873)
- Occupation: Businessman

John Cowan (November 12, 1847 – March 24, 1927) was a businessman and politician in Newfoundland. He represented Bonavista in the Newfoundland House of Assembly from 1897 to 1900 as a Conservative.

== Business career ==
Cowan was born on November 12, 1847 in St. John's. He was educated at the General Protestant Academy. He first worked as a draper at the mercantile firm Baird Brothers led by James Baird before becoming a clerk for Harvey & Co. and J. & W. Stewart's. In 1890, he became manager at Stewart's, and he took over the business in 1893 when the Stewart family closed up shop. Cowan was a prominent member of the local freemason lodge. He married Eliza Julia Earle in 1873 and they had several children.

== Politics ==
Cowan was elected to the House of Assembly in 1897 as a Conservative supporter of James S. Winter for the district of Bonavista Bay. When Winter was ousted from office in 1900, Cowan crossed the floor and joined Premier Robert Bond's Liberal caucus. Bond appointed him as the Minister of Finance and Customs in the months before the 1900 general election, but Cowan subsequently lost his seat in that race to Conservative candidate Mark Chaplin.

Cowan was later elected as a St. John's city councillor in the 1906 municipal election, where he served a full term. He remained in St. John's for the rest of his life and died on March 24, 1927.
