= Pinchard's Island, Newfoundland and Labrador =

Former island community in Newfoundland

Pinchard's Island
- Former community
- Location in Newfoundland and Labrador
- Coordinates: 49°12′00″N 53°29′19″W
- Country: Canada
- Province: Newfoundland
- Region: Bonavista Bay
- First settled: early 19th century
- Resettled: 1950

Population (1950)
  - Total: 0

Pinchard's Island was one of the communities that comprise an area on the northeast coast of the Island of Newfoundland, called Bonavista North. These communities have a shared history in that they were settled by people from England, predominantly from the West Country - Dorset, Devon Somerset and Hampshire.

== Geography ==
Pinchard's Island is situated at the northern edge of Bonavista Bay, Newfoundland about 5 km from Cape Freels. It is located near excellent fishing grounds to its east and on its south there are islets that provide shelter and protection to small boats. Pinchard's Island was one of the first settled sites in Bonavista Bay but is no longer inhabited.

== History ==
The earliest people on Pinchard's Island were probably sent over by West Country English firms to do trading at Greenspond. The first and most common family names on Pinchard's Island were: Norris, Blackmore, Hounsell, Davis, Gill, Parsons. There were 13 families in the beginning.

George Coster, a clergyman for the Church of England in Bonavista visited Pinchard's Island in 1827 and recorded 20 families residing there. He called it a thriving community with 120 people. He appointed John Sainsbury as layreader and teacher and an old fish store was used to hold the classes.

In 1845 there were 291 people living there which made Pinchard's Island the second largest community in northern Bonavista Bay. By 1850 people began moving to the nearby mainland, particularly Newtown because it had a better harbour. The population had one last peak in 1921 with 413 people, but by 1950 (population 218) the island fell under the resettlement program and were relocated.

== Church History ==
The Rev. Coster, resident minister in Greenspond, visited Pinchard's Island in 1830 and recorded 80 people living there and he catechised 24 children. In 1831 the Bishop John Inglis visited the island and baptized 3 people and confirmed 20. In October 1834 there was record that a young girl was conducting Sunday school and there were about 50 students, but no day school.

Because of Pinchard's Islands size, Julian Moreton, the minister in Greenspond argued that it should be made a parish center for the northern islands and Straight Shore rather than Greenspond being responsible for it. In 1853 there was a new church and school built on Pinchard's Island. St. Matthew's Church was consecrated in 1857 by Bishop Edward Feild, and Rev J.G. Cragg was the resident minister. However, by 1870 Pinchard's Island became part of the Greenspond circuit once more.

A Methodist church was built on the island in 1906.

== Education History ==
John Sainsbury was appointed layreader and teacher in 1827 and held classes in a disused fish store. For the next 30 years school was not consistently held until a school-chapel was built in 1844. The Board of Education for Bonavista Bay north decided that a school should be started in 1843. In October 1844, John Sainsbury was appointed to be layreader and teacher by the board.

== Census Information ==
- The 1869 census includes Pinchard's Island Inner Tickles.

	1836	1845	1869	1874
population	171	291	457	264
inhabited houses	16	24	53	34
families	-	-	73	42
Church of England	147	253	389	232
Roman Catholic	24	38	19	-
Wesleyan/Methodist	-	-	49	32
attending school	-	42	23	14
can read/write	-	-	184	131
people catching/curing fish	-	-	165	103
seamen/fishermen	-	-	-	35
total fishing boats	11	21	18	5
sealing nets	-	190	151	40
sealing vessels	-	1	11	3
men on board	-	-	86	18
tonnage	-	40	287	45
nets/seines	-	16	95	31
cod fish cured (qtls)	-	-	-	1900
fishing rooms in use	-	-	18	12
stores/barns/outhouses	-	-	22	12
barrels of potatoes produced	381(busls)	116	648	277
barrels of turnip	-	-	51	42
tons of hay	-	-	6	
sheep/swine/goats	-	-	62	37
cattle/oxen	-	2	2	
hogs	17	-	-	-
butter manufactured	-	-	40	

== See also ==
- List of communities in Newfoundland and Labrador
- Moreton, Julian. Life and Work in Newfoundland: reminiscences of thirteen years spent there. London: Rivingtons, 1863
