= John Abbott (Newfoundland politician, born 1874) =

Newfoundland fisherman and politician (1874–1947)

John Abbott MHA

Member of the Newfoundland House of Assembly for Bonavista Bay
- In office November 3, 1913 – June 2, 1924 Serving with William Coaker and Robert G. Winsor
- Preceded by: Sydney Blandford; William C. Winsor; Donald Morison
- Succeeded by: Walter Monroe; Lewis Little; William C. Winsor

Personal details
- Born: August 28, 1874 Bonavista, Newfoundland Colony
- Died: October 15, 1947 (aged 73) Bonavista, Newfoundland
- Party: Fishermen's Protective Union
- Spouses: Mary Rolls (m. 1899): Pearl Saunders
- Occupation: Fisherman

John Abbott (August 28, 1874 – October 15, 1947) was a Newfoundland fisherman and politician. He represented Bonavista Bay in the Newfoundland House of Assembly from 1913 to 1923.

== Early life ==
Abbott was born in Bonavista and educated at the Methodist School there. After completing his education, Abbott became a fisherman like his father. In 1909, he joined the Fishermen's Protective Union. In 1913, he became manager of the Union Trading Company store in Bonavista.

== Politics and legacy ==
Abbott was elected to the district of Bonavista Bay as a member of the FPU alongside party leader and president William Coaker in 1913. He retired from politics in 1923 and was named a customs collector. In 1930, he became a justice of the peace. He was widowed after his first marriage, and later remarried. He had children with both wives. Abbott died of stomach cancer in 1947, and left behind a large family. Descendants of Abbott still live in Newfoundland, and his daughter Mona Abbott Kesting has chronicled much of his work.
