= William Coaker =

Newfoundland politician and union leader

The Honourable Sir William Ford Coaker KBE
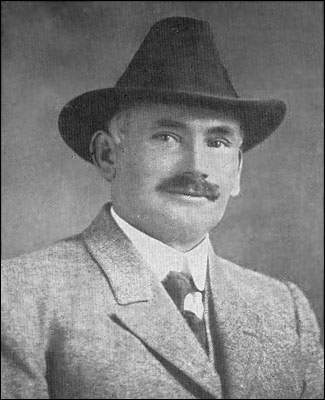
- Coaker in 1930

Minister without portfolio
- In office 1928–1932
- Prime Minister: Richard Squires

Minister of Marine and Fisheries
- In office 1919 – May 1923
- Prime Minister: Richard Squires
- Preceded by: John G. Stone
- Succeeded by: William Halfyard

President of the Fishermen's Protective Union
- In office November 3, 1908 – February 3, 1926
- Preceded by: Position established
- Succeeded by: J. H. Scammell
Legislative offices
Member of the Newfoundland House of Assembly for Bonavista East
In office October 29, 1928 – June 11, 1932
Preceded by	District established
Succeeded by	District abolished
Member of the Newfoundland House of Assembly for Bonavista
In office November 3, 1919 – June 2, 1924 Serving with John Abbott and Robert G. Winsor
Preceded by	Alfred B. Morine
Succeeded by	Walter Monroe; Lewis Little; William C. Winsor
In office October 30, 1913 – November 26, 1914 Serving with John Abbott and Robert G. Winsor
Preceded by	Sydney Blandford; William C. Winsor; Donald Morison
Succeeded by	Alfred B. Morine
Member of the Newfoundland House of Assembly for Twillingate
In office November 26, 1914 – November 3, 1919 Serving with James A. Clift and Walter Jennings
Preceded by	Robert Bond
Succeeded by	George Jones; Solomon Samson

Personal details
- Born: October 19, 1871 St. John's, Newfoundland
- Died: October 26, 1938 (aged 67) Boston, Massachusetts, United States
- Party: Fishermen's Protective Union
- Spouse: Jessie Crosbie Cook (m. 1901)
- Children: 1 (Camilla Gertrude)
- Education: Bishop Feild College
- Occupation: Businessman and union leader
- Known for: Founding the Fishermen's Protective Union and establishing Port Union

Sir William Ford Coaker KBE (October 19, 1871 – October 26, 1938) was a Newfoundland union leader and politician and founder of the Fisherman's Protective Union, the Fishermen's Union Trading Co., and the town of Port Union. A polarizing figure in Newfoundland politics and society, he was described as "the outstanding social reformer produced by Britain's Oldest Colony" by eventual Premier Joey Smallwood.

Coaker is known for criticizing the truck system which dominated the fishery of Newfoundland throughout the nineteenth and early twentieth centuries.

== Early life ==
Coaker was born in 1871 in St. John's, Newfoundland, and educated at Bishop Feild College. He had political leanings from an early age and spent his school days attending House of Assembly debates. At thirteen he organized a two-day strike against a local merchant firm, winning wage demands for himself and his young coworkers. At fourteen Coaker left school to work for the firm of McDougall and Templeton and two years later became manager of their branch store in Pike's Arm, Notre Dame Bay. During the bank crash of 1894, Coaker was bankrupted after having taken ownership of the store four years prior.

Coaker studied agriculture at Macdonald College, Quebec, and began farming operations at "Coakerville," an island at Dildo Run. By 1902, he would also serve as telegraph operator, customs worker, and postmaster. In 1903 he formed a telegraph operators' union, though a year later he quit the union and his three most recent professions. Retiring to Coakerville, he began contemplating an organization of fishermen and the first constitution for the union he would later found.

== Fishermen's Protective Union ==
Coaker organized the first meeting of what would become the Fishermen's Protective Union in the Loyal Orange Lodge at Herring Neck, Newfoundland and Labrador in November 1908. He led the organization as it expanded into a multifaceted interest involved in trading, publishing, light and power, shipbuilding, shipping and cold storage.

In 1923, he was made a Knight Commander of the Order of the British Empire. In 1999, a novel loosely based on his life was written by Gordon Rodgers.

There is both a poem and song written referencing Coaker. The original anthem of the Fishers Protective Union was titled "We are coming Mr. Coaker, and we're 40 thousand strong". This anthem was sung or chanted at FPU meetings to show support for Coaker and his movement to unite the fishermen. There is also a poem titled "Coaker's Dream".

== Political career ==
He took the FPU into politics in 1912 and Coaker was elected to the Newfoundland House of Assembly in the 1913 general election where he remained until 1924. He served in cabinet during World War I and from 1919 until 1924 when he was minister of marine and fisheries.

== Personal life ==
Coaker married Jessie Leah Crosbie Cook, born 22 January 1871 of Southside, St. John's, in 1901. They lived together at Coakerville and had one daughter, Carmine (Camilla) Gertrude Coaker, born in 1902. Camilla attended Mount Allison University in Sackville, New Brunswick and Havergal College in Toronto, Ontario. Lady Jessie Coaker died on January 9, 1947, at the age of 76.

== Legacy ==
The former high school on New World Island, Coaker Academy, was named after Coaker. The school located in Virgin Arm, Newfoundland was closed in 2005 in favor of the islands new school, New World Island Academy, and has since been destroyed due to asbestos.
