= Naboth Winsor =

Canadian historian (1916–1997)

Naboth Winsor (October 5, 1916 – June 1997) was born to Robert Stewart Winsor and Jane (Butt) Winsor, on Winsor's Island, one of the islands comprising Swain's Island, Bonavista Bay, Newfoundland. Winsor and his family moved to nearby Wesleyville when he was four years old. Winsor received a Bachelor of Arts Degree, the Degree of Master of Divinity, and a Master of Arts Degree. He was an Ordained United Church Minister, and later, an author. Winsor was a United Church Minister for forty-four years, and he wrote several books on certain aspects of Newfoundland History, primarily on areas in Bonavista Bay, Newfoundland.

== Education ==
Winsor received his early education in Wesleyville and then attended Memorial University College in the capital of Newfoundland, St. John's. He then attended Dalhousie University in Halifax, Nova Scotia, where he received a Bachelor of Arts degree with Distinction in four History courses. Winsor also received the degree of Master of Divinity from Pine Hill Divinity, also located in Halifax, Nova Scotia. Several years later, he entered into the Master of Arts program at Memorial University of Newfoundland and he received his Master of Arts Degree in 1971.

== Ministry ==
Naboth Winsor was ordained a Minister in 1948 and served on the Pastoral Charges of Bay Roberts, Lewisporte, Carbonear, Newtown-Lumsden, and George Street (St. John's). Winsor served as Minister for the George Street Pastoral Charge in St. John's, Newfoundland for seven years, from 1961 to 1968. He was also President of the Newfoundland Conference in 1977 to 1978. He faithfully served 44 years in the Ministry of the United Church of Canada serving churches both in Newfoundland and mainland Canada.

== Books ==
Methodism in Newfoundland, 1855-1884 Master of Arts Thesis, Memorial University of Newfoundland, 1970.

Building on a Firm Foundation

By Their Works; A history of the Wesleyville congregation, The Methodist Church, 1874 - 1925

The Church Between the Tickles; A History of St. James' Anglican Church, Pool's Island, Bonavista Bay

Good Workmanship and Lasting Devotion; A History of St. Stephen's Anglican Church, Greenspond, Bonavista Bay, Newfoundland 1810 - 1925 Published August 1982 by B.S.C. Printers (1982) Limited, Gander, Newfoundland

Hearts Strangely Warmed

A History of Education in Greenspond, 1816 - 1979; Life and Work in Newfoundland By the Rev. Julian Moreton, Church of England Missionary Greenspond, Newfoundland, from 1849 to 1860. A Reprint: Edited by the Rev. Naboth Winsor, Newtown Newfoundland, 1977.

A Pilgrimage of Faith

Resounding God's Praises On Islands, In Coves A History of the Methodist Church, 1862 - 1925, and the United Church of Canada, 1925 - 1990, in Settlements from Greenspond to Deadman's Bay, except Wesleyville

The Sea, Our Life-Blood, A History of Wesleyville, Newfoundland, A Project of the "Ocean View" Senior Citizens Printed 1984, by B.S.C. Printers (1984) Limited, Gander, Newfoundland.

Skipper Parsons edited by Rev. Naboth Winsor

Stalwart Men and Sturdy Ships, A History of the Prosecutions of the Seal Fishery by the Sealers of Bonavista Bay North, Newfoundland Printed 1985 by Economy Printing Limited, Gander, Newfoundland

Three Newfoundland Stories edited by Rev. Naboth Winsor

Through Peril, Toil and Pain, The Story of the First One Hundred Years (1825 - 1925) of the Church of England in the Northern Settlements of Greenspond Mission, Bonavista Bay, Newfoundland

== Family ==
Naboth Winsor married Mildred Gough of Elliston, Trinity Bay, Newfoundland. They had two daughters, (Janet) Lynne and Anne; and grandchildren as well. When he retired, he moved back to Wesleyville. He died on 2 June 1997 at age 80.
