= Fishermen's Union Trading Co. =

Company in Newfoundland, 1911–1977

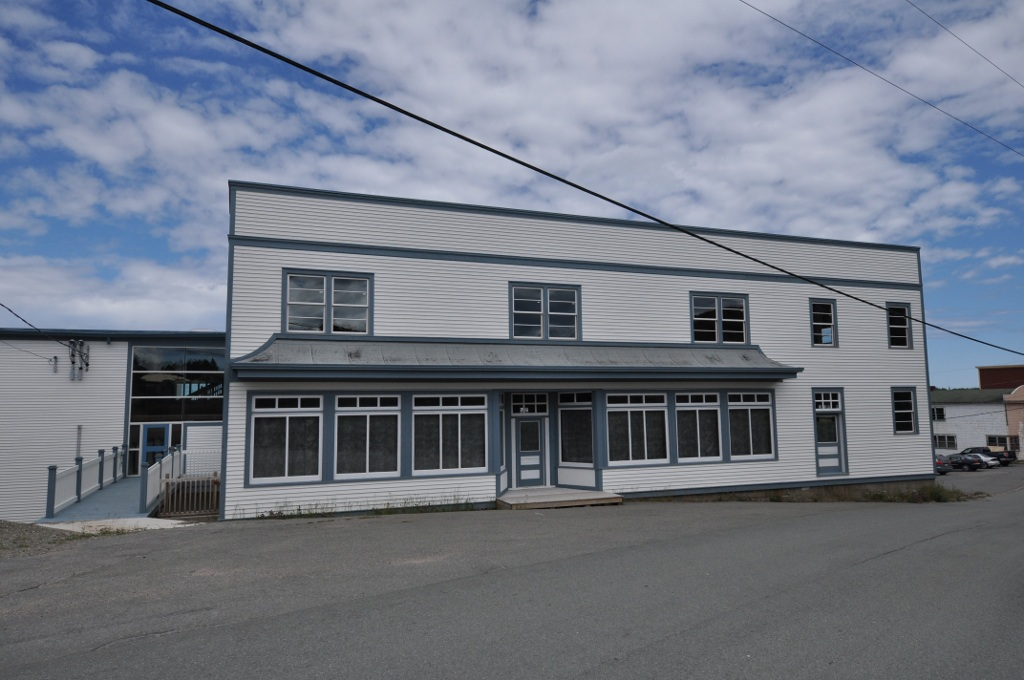
- Port Union former store
- Abbreviation: FUTC
- Established: 1911; 115 years ago
- Founder: William Coaker
- Dissolved: 1977; 49 years ago
- Type: Cooperative
- Headquarters: Port Union, Newfoundland and Labrador
- Products: Salt cod
- Parent organization: Fishermen's Protective Union

The Fishermen's Union Trading Company (F.U.T.C.), a limited liability company, was founded in 1911 to be the commercial arm of the Fishermen's Protective Union (FPU). Its mandate, as set out by William Coaker, founder of the FPU, was to be the agent for cooperative purchasing of supplies by fishermen along the coast of Newfoundland and to also serve as a cooperative marketing agent of their fish catches.

== Purpose ==
As part of the greater movement by Coaker to organize the fishermen along the coast by the formation of the FPU, it was necessary to establish a trading company to combat the credit or truck system existing at that time. Fishermen were encouraged to purchase shares which were then used to buy goods and sold back to the fishermen at cost. In eight years with 4,421 shareholders and over 40 stores, the annual trade of fish and supplies was in excess of $3 million.

== Expansion ==
In 1913 the company purchased the Crosbie premises at St. John's and the steamship Kintail. The steamship was renamed the Can’t Lose. Upon the building of a new settlement called Port Union complete with wharves and housing facilities the headquarters were moved there in 1918.

By 1928, with a fleet of thirty schooners and three steamers it was recognized as one of the largest mercantile companies in Newfoundland and by 1937 it was identified as the largest.

== Decline and closure ==
Although the company was the third largest exporter of salt cod from Newfoundland, it had limited capital to respond to changes in the industry. With the decline of the salt cod industry in Newfoundland in the 60s and early 70s the company suffered decline. In May 1977, it went into receivership on default of a $440,000 bank loan.
