= George Macness Johnson =

Canadian lawyer, judge and politician (1853-1935)

George Macness Johnson (August 11, 1853 – December 17, 1935) was a lawyer, judge and politician in Newfoundland. He represented Trinity in the Newfoundland House of Assembly from 1894 to 1897 and from 1900 to 1902.

The son of Reverend George M. Johnson and Frances Carrington, he was born in St. John's and was educated at the Church of England Academy there and at St. John's College in Hurstpierpoint, England. After completing his studies in law, Johnson returned to Newfoundland. In 1875, he joined Sir William Whiteway as junior partner in his law practice.

He married Anne Elizabeth Bown. They had three daughters and one son. Johnson organized a branch of the Society for the Prevention of Cruelty to Animals in St. John's. He was also a member of the Masonic Order.

He was elected to the Newfoundland assembly in an 1894 by-election but was defeated when he ran for reelection in 1897. He was elected again in 1900. In 1902, he resigned from the assembly when he was named to the Newfoundland Supreme Court. In 1926, Johnson retired from the bench and moved to England. He returned to Newfoundland in September 1935 and died in St. John's in December that same year.

His daughter Sybil Frances Carrington Johnson married Brian Dunfield.
