= Greenspond =

Greenspond Grin d'Espagne
- Town
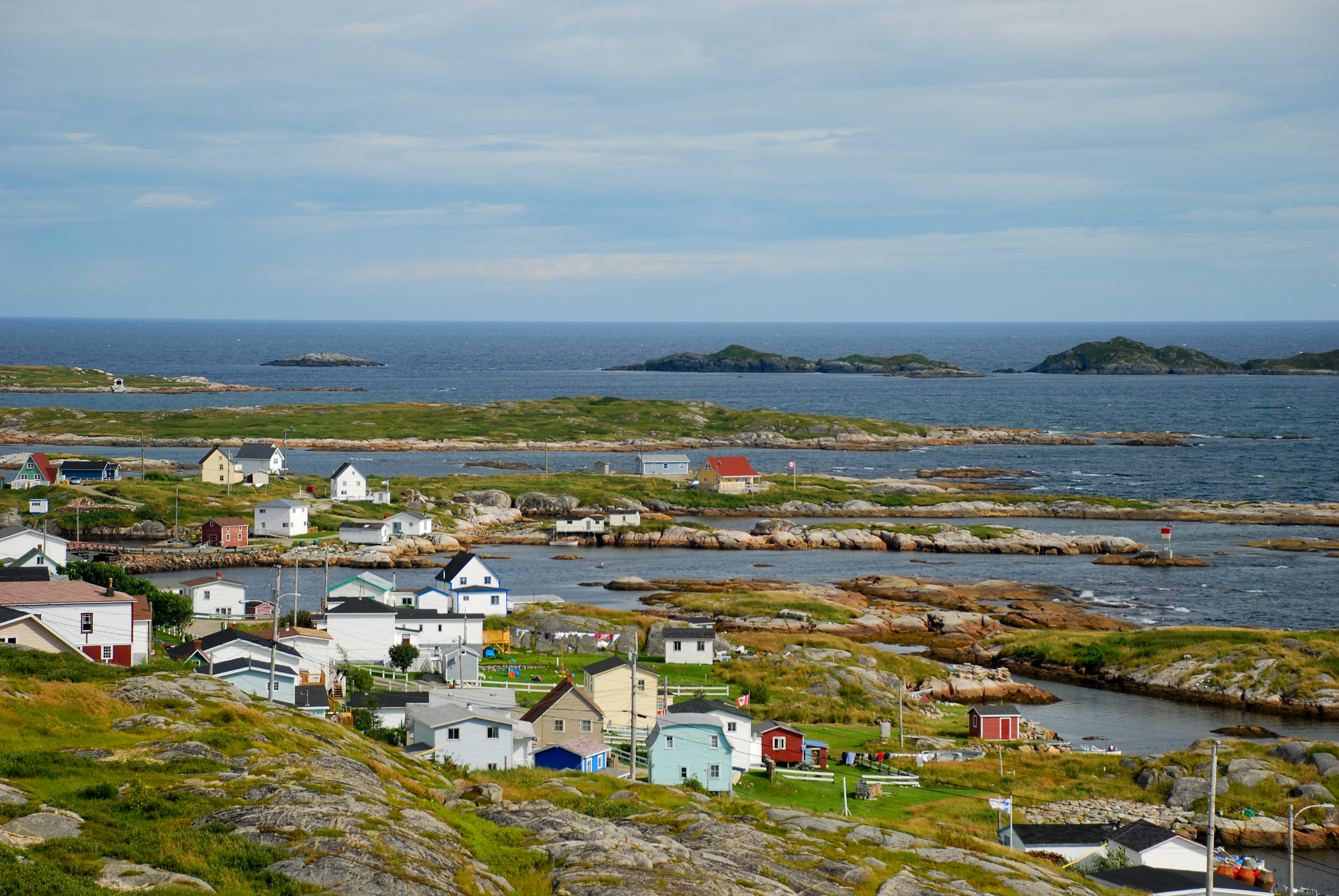
- Nickname: Capital of the North
- Location of Greenspond in Newfoundland
- Coordinates: 49°04′00″N 53°34′34″W
- Country: Canada
- Province: Newfoundland and Labrador
- Settled: 1690s
- Incorporated: 1951

Area
  - Total: 2.85 km^{2} (1.10 sq mi)

Population (2021)
  - Total: 257
- Time zone: UTC-3:30 (Newfoundland Time)
  - Summer (DST): UTC-2:30 (Newfoundland Daylight)
- Area code: 709

Greenspond is a community in the province of Newfoundland and Labrador, Canada.

Greenspond is one of the communities that comprise an area called Bonavista North, in Bonavista Bay, on the northeast coast of the Island of Newfoundland. These communities have a shared history in that they were settled by people from England, predominantly from the West Country: Somerset, Devon, Dorset and Hampshire.

Greenspond is one of the oldest continuously inhabited outports in Newfoundland, having been settled in the 1690s. In the first 100 years after settlement, the people of Greenspond lived from the bounty of the sea. The community thrived and became a major trading centre because of its proximity to and its position on the main sea lanes and was known as the "Capital of the North".

== Geography ==
The community of Greenspond comprises several islands: the largest is Greenspond Island, and the smaller ones include Batterton, Ship, Newell's, Wing's, Pig, Maiden, Groat's, and Puffin Island. There are several explanations of the origin of the name "Greenspond". The most popular is that it is based on the names of two of the early families, Green and Pond. Another states that the name reflected the green of the trees that covered the island and the harbour basin which resembled a pond. Records from the French Colonial office referred to Greenspond as "Grin d'Espagne", roughly translated it means "a little bit of Spain". "Grin d'Espagne" could have subsequently been pronounced Greenspond by the English settlers.

== History ==
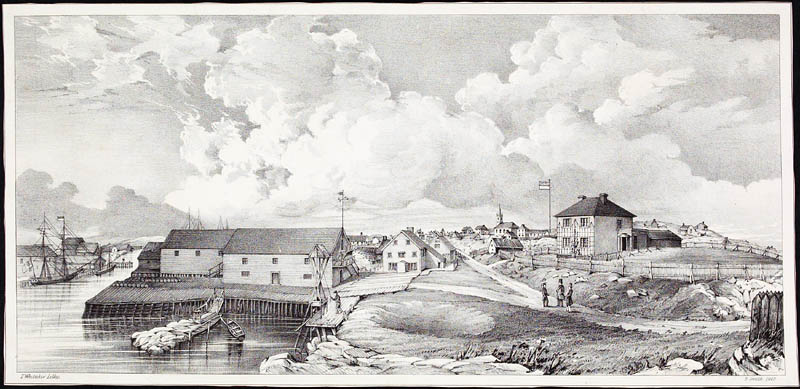
Greenspond, Newfoundland, 1846.

The fabric of the church is deeply woven into Greenspond's history. The early settlers from the West Country of England brought their religious affiliations with them. The first visit by a clergy was Rev. Henry Jones of the Church of England, who under the auspices of the Society for the Propagation of the Gospel served in Bonavista Bay in the 1720s. His first trip to Greenspond was in 1728 but the first church came much later. St. Stephen's Church was opened in 1812 and owes its construction to the efforts of Governor Sir John Thomas Duckworth who had allocated funds for the building of the church. In 1829 a resident clergyman, Rev. N.A. Coster, was appointed to Greenspond followed by Rev. Julian Moreton in 1849. Moreton wrote: "the mission of Greenspond ... is the largest ... in the diocese of Newfoundland, extending along the 70 miles of coast and requiring a journey of 200 miles to visit all its stations." The size of the mission facilitated the enlargement of the church in the 1850s.

Wesleyan Methodism made its first appearance in 1796 when Rev. George Smith, a travelling missionary from Trinity, organized a small Methodist class in the community. Services were held in stores and private houses, and, with the assistance of laymen, Methodist membership gradually increased. In 1862 Rev. John Allen became Greenspond's first Methodist clergyman in a mission that extended from Flat Islands to Musgrave Harbour. In 1873, the first Methodist church was opened with a seating capacity for 600. It served the congregation until 1965 when it was torn down to make way for a new building. In the late 19th century the Salvation Army came to Greenspond and built a citadel up on the Island. Later, as membership grew another larger citadel was built down by the main road. There were never many Roman Catholics in Greenspond. In 1826 there were 500 Protestants and 100 Catholics but many of them were to move elsewhere. The 1874 census shows 945 Church of England adherents, 499 Methodists, and 79 Roman Catholics. In 1901 there were only 18 Roman Catholics listed. Nevertheless, they built a small Roman Catholic chapel in Pond Head.

=== The Orange Order ===
The Orange Order was formed in Ireland in 1795 to honour the defeat of James II of England by William of Orange at the Battle of Boyne on July 12, 1690. The Orders origin spawned from distrust and conflict between Protestant and Catholic groups in the province of Ulster in Northern Ireland during severe economic problems in the 18th century.

By the 20th century the Orange Order had become a worldwide movement, with over 5000 lodges worldwide, 1700 of them in Canada alone.

The first members of the Orange Order in Greenspond joined in St. John's around 1870. Some of these men were, Charles Whitemarsh, Thomas Wornell, Edward Meadus, Sylvester Green, Job Granter, Ethelred Carter, William White, and Sr. James Burry. Around 1875 the Burnette Lodge number 28 was formed in Greenspond and had its first meetings in Fred White’s store.

The first Orange Hall in Greenspond was built in 1880, which was shared by Greenspond’s two lodges, Burnett and Glover. Glover Lodge number 33, named after the Newfoundland Governor of the time, Sir John Glover, was formed from a split among the Anglican and Methodist Burnett members.

Unfortunately the Hall was destroyed by fire in 1898, causing the two lodges to hold meetings elsewhere. The Burnett Lodge held meetings at the St. James Society of United Fishermen Hall and the Glover Lodge met at the Blandford Society of United Fishermen Hall. In 1900 the Glover Lodge bought John Oakley’s shop and made it into their Orange Hall, while the Burnett Lodge bought the old Court House.

The hall that burned down was eventually restored by the Orange Young Britons (LOYBA), who were very active in the 1880s. They named their lodge "No Surrender, number 29", and their first master was George Burry of Greenspond. The LOYBA went dormant in the early 1920s until it reorganized in 1929. Another group, the Royal Black Preceptory, number 647, was formed in 1904 named "William Johnson RBP 647" and used the Glover Orange Hall. The first worshipful preceptor was a Mr. Edward Carter of Greenspond. This lodge went dormant in 1986.

A Greenspond resident, Kenneth Oakley began correspondence with Newfoundland’s Prime Minister and Grand Master of the Loyal Orange Association, Sir Richard Squires, in 1914 to inquire about uniting the Burnett and Glover lodges in Greenspond. Oakley was the Worshipful Master of the Glover Lodge, and with over 150 members by 1914, the hall was no longer big enough to accommodate them.

Therefore, in 1920 the Glover Lodge completely renovated and enlarged their hall. Four years later, the two lodges, Burnett and Glover, amalgamated and under the new charter the united lodges became Greenspond Loyal Orange Lodge, number 205. In the 1970s the hall was renovated once more by free labour which included a new roof, windows, siding and interior work.

In Greenspond, Orangemen paraded around the New Year but the fishermen always paraded on Candlemas Day (February 2). The parades were attended by Anglicans and Methodists, and eventually by the Salvation Army as well. They were usually large celebrations with a band and banners. The height of Orange activity in Greenspond occurred around the war years (1939–1945). Even when Orangeism was declining across the country Greenspond continued to thrive. In 1981, for example, Greenspond received a plaque for the most initiations in Newfoundland, presented to them by the Grand Master R.W. Bro. Renea Locke. Just three years later in 1984, however, the Lodge in Greenspond was inactive.

== Education ==
The history of education in Greenspond followed that of the churches. In 1815 the residents of Greenspond petitioned the government to appoint Thomas Walley as lay reader and teacher. Mr. Thomas Walley read in the church every Sunday and was capable of teaching the children to read and write. Therefore, residents John Edgar, Thomas Read, Nathanial Smith, and James Cram wrote to the S.P.C.K. asking them to pay a salary to Mr. Walley so he could be the school master. On October 25, 1815, The Newfoundland Governor at the time, wrote that Mr. Walley was being given 15 pounds per annum by the government to read prayers on Sunday in the absence of a missionary. He was also appointed school master and was given 30 pounds for two years. Thomas Walley continued to teach there until 1825 when he moved to Gooseberry Island to serve as schoolmaster there.

In a letter, written by Archdeacon George Coster on July 21, 1827, he said Greenspond had started building a house and schoolroom, and that the Newfoundland School Society promised to send a teacher. The first Newfoundland School Society teacher in Greenspond was a Mr. and Mrs. William King who left England and came to Greenspond in 1828. They opened the day school with 34 children, and the Sunday School with 54 children. In an 1829–1830 school report, it said the school in Greenspond was nearly completed and that the attendance was 56 children attending day school and 26 adults attending the night school. By 1831 there were 111 children in day school, 142 children in Sunday School, and 49 adults in night school. These numbers were unprecedented for a small community in Newfoundland during this period.

Mr. Benjamin Fleet succeeded Mr. and Mrs. King when he arrived in August 1832 and began school.

In 1839, Mr. Robert Dyer arrived from England and stayed for 20 years as the teacher in Greenspond. The Newfoundland School Society maintained a very successful elementary school in Greenspond. In 1844, for example, there was an average attendance of 103 children and by May 1847, 119 girls and 110 boys were recorded on the attendance, a total of 229 students. In 1850 Robert Dyer recorded in his diary that a visiting judge, Judge Des Barres, had claimed that the school in Greenspond was the "largest in the island". In 1852 Dyer recorded an attendance of 283, shortly after, Dyer made a request for an infant school, and in 1854 the number on the books for the infant school was 300. The Rev Vicars inspected the school on August 28, 1856, and found 109 infants under the care of a school mistress, Miss Oakley.

The Methodists opened a school in 1880 and a Salvation Army school opened in 1900.

== Economy ==
Greenspond's chief asset was its proximity to the inshore cod fishing grounds. During the 19th century, fishermen not only exploited the local fishing grounds but also went further afield to find codfish, some as far as the coast of Labrador. By mid-century it had become a prominent supply centre and clearing for the Labrador fishery which led to the appointment of a collector of customs by the colonial government in 1838.

The annual seal hunt was another asset in the Greenspond economy. The community's advantageous location, in the path of the northern ice floe, enabled land-based hunters using guns and nets to capture seals. By the early 19th century the seal hunt had become an important part of life at Greenspond. Historian Judge D.W. Prowse reported that in 1807 "from Bonavista and Greenspond 6 ships went to the ice with 64 men." He also reported that in the town of Greenspond itself 80 men took 17,000 seals in nets. In 1860, 18 vessels, each with a crew of about 20 men, prosecuting the seal hunt out of Greenspond. Because most of the crews and sealing captains were drawn from Greenspond and neighbouring communities, sealing ships would leave St. John's and Conception Bay in the fall of the year and anchor in Greenspond Tickle until spring when the hunt would begin. There was great pride in the accomplishment of local sealing captains, such as Darius Blandford who made the "quickest trip ever recorded" and Peter Carter who secured the heaviest load of seals in the history of the industry.

Its importance as a major trading and supply centre meant that Greenspond enjoyed a steady population growth of prosperous tradesmen and artisans: tinsmiths, blacksmiths, coopers, cobblers, carpenters and others. Merchant firms included Slade, Fryer, Brooking and Co., William Cox & Co., Ridley & Sons, E. Duder, W. Waterman, Philip Hutchins, Harvey & Co, James Ryan, and J&W Stewart. These companies were primarily engaged in the buying and selling of fish but also in supplying and outfitting for these fisheries. The fish-trading business houses were also general stores. Early in the 20th century, the Fisherman's Protective Union, which had a large branch in Greenspond, opened a Union Trading Store in the community and in 1910 Greenspond had the honour of hosting the Union's annual Convention.

== Culture ==
Demographics
Population in 2001	383
Population change from 1996	-9.9%
Median age	39.7
Number of families	115
Number of married couples	100
Total number of dwellings	135
Protestant	100%
Land Area (km^{2}.)	2.85

Statistics Canada detail demographics follow link here

The early inhabitants of Greenspond hailed from the West of England, mainly Dorset but also Devon, Hampshire, and Somerset. The names of these early settlers can still be found there today: Bishop, Blandford, Bragg, Burry, Burton, Butler, Carter, Chaytor, Crocker, Dominey, Dyke, Easton, Feltham, Granter, Green, Harding, Hawkins, Hoddinott, Hoskins, Hunt, Hutchins, Kean, Lovelace, Lush, Meadus, Mullett, Mullins, Oakley, Oldford, Osmond, Parsons, Pond, Rogers, Samson, Saunders, Smith, Stratton, Way, Wheeler, White, Wicks, Woodland, Wornell, Wright, and Young.

Gradually Greenspond acquired the services and facilities needed by a bustling commercial town. In 1848 there was a regular mail and passenger service, a fortnightly steamer, and a weekly overland route between Greenspond and St. John's. To insure the safety of the steamer into Greenspond after nightfall, the government erected a lighthouse in 1873 on Puffin Island at the approach to Greenspond harbour. In winter when the steamers did not run, the trains transported the mails to Gambo and from there couriers - often Micmac - carried it overland to Greenspond. John Joe, perhaps the most notable Micmac courier travelled for many years with his dogs from Gambo to Greenspond. The laying of a submarine cable between Greenspond and the Newfoundland mainland in 1885 and the subsequent provision of a telegraph service greatly enhanced Greenspond's communication with the rest of Newfoundland and the outside world. The turn of the 20th century marked Greenspond's zenith with a population of almost 2000, a resident doctor, magistrate, policeman, customs officer, clergy, postmaster, teachers, and numerous business enterprises. It can be said that Greenspond's export of human resources equals or exceeds its export in cod, seals, salmon and the like.

Throughout the 20th century the fishery remained the major economic enterprise of the people of Greenspond: a bait depot was established in 1946, a fresh-fish processing plant was built in 1957 and a smokehouse was opened in the 1970s. In 1951 the town was incorporated, and with municipal government came water and sewer facilities, improved light and power services, improvements in local roads and, perhaps, the most important of all, the construction of a causeway connecting Greenspond Island with the Newfoundland mainland. In the 1990s Greenspond continues to thrive, a superb example of a Newfoundland coastal community which has survived and prospered for three hundred years despite the inherent fluctuations in a fishing economy.

Puffin Island Lighthouse
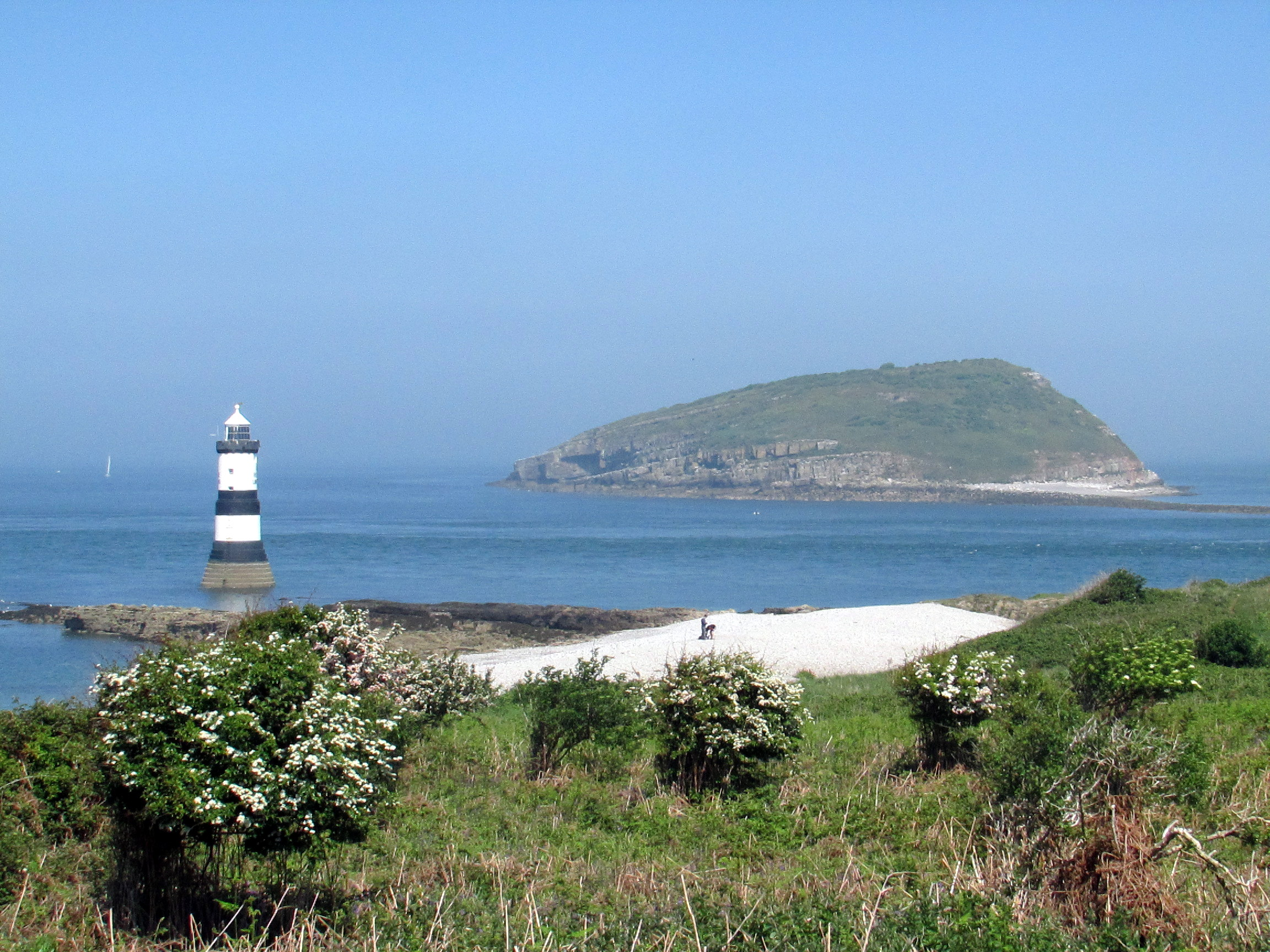
- Location: Puffin Island, Greenspond
- Coordinates: 49°03′42″N 53°33′04″W

Tower
- Constructed: 1873 (first)
- Foundation: concrete base
- Construction: wooden tower
- Height: 8 m (26 ft)
- Shape: square truncated tower with balcony and lantern
- Markings: white tower with a horizontal red band
- Operator: Canadian Coast Guard

Light
- First lit: 1951 (current)
- Focal height: 21 m (69 ft)
- Range: 16 nmi (30 km; 18 mi)
- Characteristic: Fl W 5s

== Demographics ==
In the 2021 Census of Population conducted by Statistics Canada, Greenspond had a population of 257 living in 116 of its 177 total private dwellings, a change of −3.4% from its 2016 population of 266. With a land area of 2.75 km^{2} (1.06 sq mi), it had a population density of 93.5/km^{2} (242.0/sq mi) in 2021.

== Attractions ==
- Harding House Bed and Breakfast
- Greenspond Trail
- Harding House Heritage Newfoundland

== See also ==
- List of lighthouses in Canada
- List of cities and towns in Newfoundland and Labrador
- Newfoundland School Society
- Julian Moreton
- Stella Burry
