= John Shannon Munn =

Newfoundland businessman

John Munn
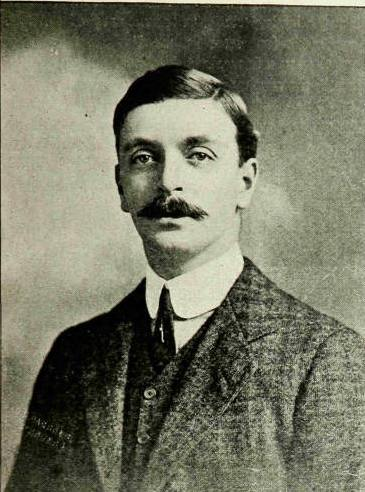
- Born: John Shannon Munn; 6 June 1880; Harbour Grace, Newfoundland Colony
- Died: 24 February 1918 (aged 37) at sea, near Cappahayden, Dominion of Newfoundland
- Known for: Company director, first-class cricketer
- Spouse: Alice McGowen (1918, his death)
- Cricket career

Cricket information
- Bowling: Left-arm
- Role: Bowler

Domestic team information
- Years: Team
- 1900–1901: Oxford University

Career statistics
Competition	FC
Matches	10
Runs scored	55
Batting average	9.16
100s/50s	0/0
Top score	13*
Balls bowled	1,276
Wickets	24
Bowling average	29.62
5 wickets in innings	0
10 wickets in match	0
Best bowling	4/39
Catches/stumpings	2/–
- Source: ESPNCricinfo, 1 Jan. 2015

John Shannon Munn (6 June 1880 – 24 February 1918) was a prominent early-20th-century Newfoundlander. The step-son of Sir Edgar Bowring, he rose to become managing director of Bowring Brothers, but died in the wreck of the SS Florizel in 1918, along with his three-year-old daughter, Betty. Munn had also been a talented cricketer in his youth, and is one of the few Newfoundlanders to play at first-class level, having played in England for the University of Oxford.

== Family and early life ==
John Shannon Munn was born in 1880 in Harbour Grace, Newfoundland, into a prominent local family. The company established by his Scottish-born grandfather, John Munn, owned several boats in Newfoundland's sealing and fishing fleets, and also owned Harbour Grace's newspaper and main store. Following the elder Munn's retirement in 1878, his son (John Shannon Munn's father), William Panton Munn, assumed management of the company together with his cousin, Robert Stewart Munn. William Munn died in 1882 and his widow, born Flora LeMessurier Clift, remarried in 1888 to Edgar Rennie Bowring, scion of another merchant family.

Bowring (later Sir Edgar) later became a director at Bowring Brothers (established by his grandfather, Benjamin Bowring), and John Shannon Munn became his protege at the firm after completing his education. Munn initially attended the Church of England College in St. John's (now Bishop Feild College), but was sent to England for further schooling, as had his step-father. From 1894, he attended the Forest School, a public school in Walthamstow, Essex.

== Cricket ==
Cricket had become reasonably popular in Newfoundland by the late 19th century, but died out following the First World War. Munn was likely introduced to the sport on the island, and continued playing at the Forest School, where he was a regular in the school first XI. In his last season at the school, in 1899, he took 55 wickets at an average of 13.96. Wisden, in its coverage of public schools cricket, noted especially his performance against Epsom College, where he took a five-wicket haul and scored a half-century to help Forest School to a 220-run victory.

Going on to Hertford College, Oxford, Munn played in two trial matches for Oxford University Cricket Club prior to the start of the 1900 season, taking a five-wicket haul in both games. Despite this form, he did not make his debut for the first XI until Oxford's fourth first-class match of the season, likely due to his status as a first-year student. On debut against Somerset in June 1900, Munn opened the bowling with Harold White, with his teammates including Bernard Bosanquet, and, Tip Foster, a future England captain. He took the wickets of four top-order batsmen in Somerset's first innings, finishing with 4/53. Munn played three further matches during the 1900 season, against Worcestershire at Oxford, Surrey at The Oval, and the MCC at Lord's. He finished the season with 13 wickets at an average of 16.76, including another four-wicket haul, 4/39 against Worcestershire. That performance was to be his best at first-class level.

Despite his earlier performances, Munn failed to make the Oxford team for the annual match against the University of Cambridge. Instead of playing for a County Championship side later in the season, like many of his teammates, he returned to Newfoundland for the rest of the summer. There, Munn played in the local St. John's league. In late August 1900, he turned out for a St. John's representative side in two games against an I Zingari team from Boston. He took figures of 8/17 in the second of those matches, which was attended by around 1,200 people. Back at Oxford for the 1901 season, Munn performed poorly in pre-season trial matches, but was in the first XI for Oxford's third first-class fixture of the season, against Surrey in late May. Usually batting at number eleven, following a series of not out innings, he was promoted to open the batting in a second fixture against Surrey, played in late June. He scored only 11 runs, and was back at number eleven for the next match, against Sussex. Unlike the previous season, Munn was selected for the 1901 Oxford–Cambridge fixture, played at Lord's. In the match, which was to be his last at first-class level, he took only a single wicket, finishing his season with 11 wickets from six games.

Munn returned to Newfoundland at the end of 1901, having never graduated from Oxford, or received his Blue. He finished his first-class career with 24 wickets from 10 matches, at an average of 29.62. Two of his step-father's second cousins also played cricket at high levels—William Bowring played for Barbados and the West Indies, and his brother, Frank Harvey Bowring, Oxford-educated like Munn, played for Liverpool and District, though never at first-class level. Munn is one of only three first-class cricketers known to have been born in Newfoundland, the others being William Bowring and Stuart Pitts, who briefly played for Middlesex.

== Later life and death ==
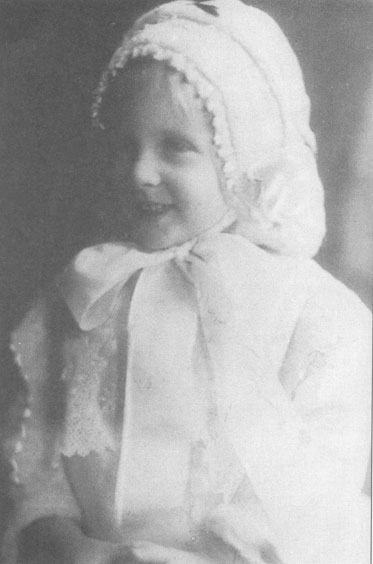
John Munn's three-year-old daughter, Betty, died with him in the wreck of the SS Florizel.

Having risen to become a director of his step-father's company, in January 1908 Munn married Alice May McGowen, the daughter of John Roche McGowen, the Inspector-General (chief officer) of the Royal Newfoundland Constabulary. The wedding, officiated by the Bishop of Newfoundland, Llewellyn Jones, was held at the Cathedral of St. John the Baptist in St. John's, and attended by a number prominent Newfoundlanders. A reception was held at Government House, the official residence of the governor of Newfoundland. The couple had one daughter together, Elizabeth Shannon Munn (known as Betty), born in 1914.

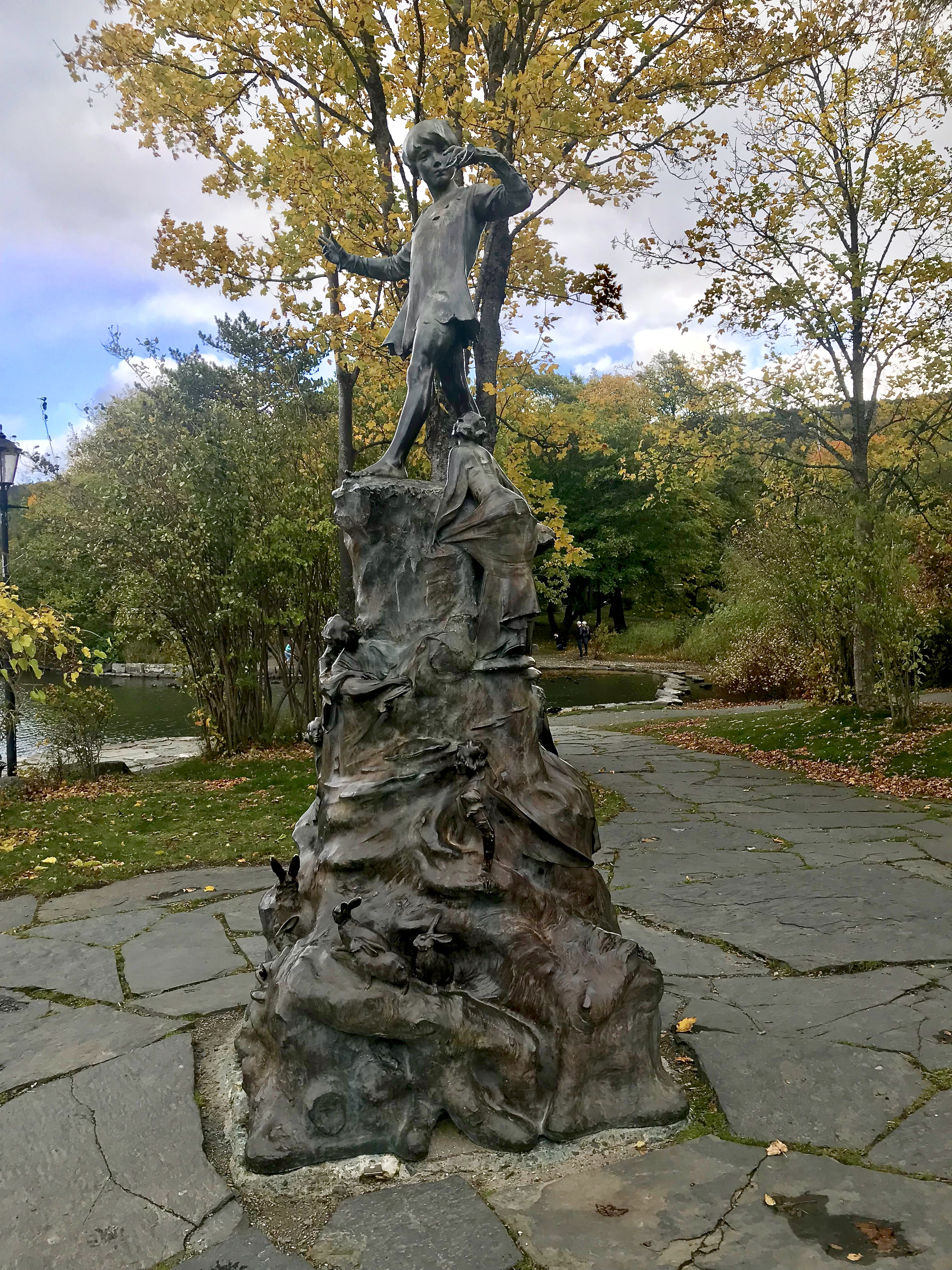
After the deaths of Munn and his daughter, Sir Edgar Bowring had a statue of Peter Pan erected in Bowring Park, St. John's.

Aged 34, Munn was too old to enlist during the First World War, but served as treasurer of a committee established to fund the volunteer Newfoundland Regiment, which saw service in France throughout the war. By 1918, he had succeeded his step-father as managing director of Bowring Brothers. Early in that year, he booked passage from St. John's to New York City via Halifax, aboard the SS Florizel, a passenger liner employed by his company's Red Cross Line. He was accompanied by his three-year-old daughter and her nursemaid, Constance Trenchard. His wife was already in New York, and the family planned to vacation in Florida for two months. On the night of 23 February, shortly after leaving St. John's, Florizel met a blizzard near Cape Race. Due to a navigational error, the ship's captain, William J. Martin, turned westward well before passing the cape, causing her to founder 300 yards (270 m) offshore of Horn Head Point, close to Cappahayden. Munn, his daughter, and her nurse were killed, along with 91 others.

After the deaths of his granddaughter and step-son, Sir Edgar Bowring commissioned several memorials in their honour. John Munn was commemorated by a stained-glass window at St. Thomas' Anglican Church, St. John's, as well as a park in Harbour Grace (Shannon Park) and new facilities for a St. John's orphanage (renamed the Shannon Munn Memorial). The most notable memorial, in honour of Betty Munn, was an exact replica of the statue of Peter Pan in Kensington Gardens, London, made by sculptor George Frampton from his original. The replica, standing in Bowring Park, St. John's, was unveiled in August 1925, inscribed "In memory of a dear little girl who loved the Park". Frampton believed the St. John's statue to be superior to the Kensington Gardens original, as "the wholly natural surroundings and flowing river [were] more in keeping with the spirit of Peter".
