= Sable Chief =

WWI mascot dog

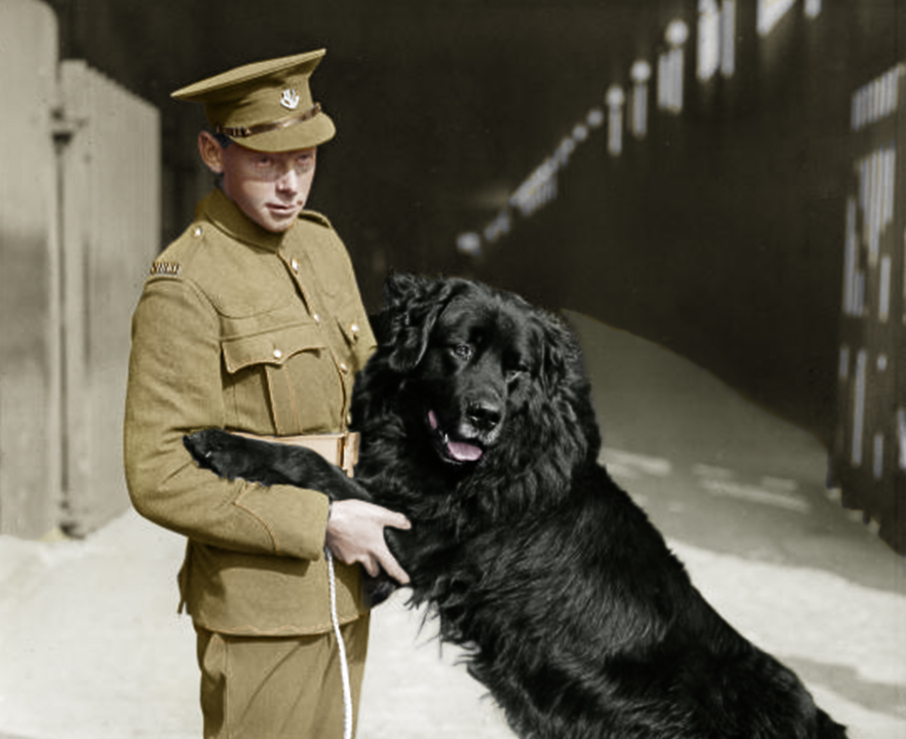
Sable Chief, a regimental mascot with his handler, Pte. Hazen Fraser, circa 1917

Sable Chief was a Newfoundland dog that served as the mascot of the Royal Newfoundland Regiment during World War I. He was presented officially on 1 Oct 1914, before troops left St. John's on the SS Florizel, by James R. Stick of the Royal Stores, Ltd, father of Leonard Stick, the first man to enlist in the regiment. Prior to his official presentation, the mascot was photographed at the Pleasantville training camp in Sept 1914 with Prime Minister Edward Patrick Morris (1859–1935), Governor Sir Walter Edward Davidson (1859–1923), Capt. William Hodgson Franklin (the first Commanding Officer of the Newfoundland Regiment), Capt. J. W. March, Capt. Cluny Macpherson (1879–1966) (Principal Medical Officer, 1st Newfoundland Regiment and inventor of the gas mask), and other dignitaries.

Sable Chief became well known for his immense size and dignified demeanor. At 3 years of age, he weighed 150 lbs. During ceremonial events, he would march at the front of the band, keeping in step throughout, and he would stand at attention during the playing of the Newfoundland National Anthem. He was regarded among the troops as a general morale booster, and visited wounded soldiers. Sable Chief was outfitted with a collection box at events to raise donations for the British Red Cross Prisoners of War Fund.

Sable Chief was a pure-bred Newfoundland dog; by WW1, this original strain of the breed had become rare in the colony. He was the same lineage as Bouncer, the Newfoundland dog accompanied by a dog-cart, presented by the children of Newfoundland to the Duke & Duchess of Cornwall and York (later George V and Queen Mary), during their visit to the colony in 1901.

The organizers of Newfoundland Week (22-29 Sept 1917) arranged for the Regimental Band to travel from Scotland to visit London to represent the colony, especially to represent the 1st Battalion, which at that time was engaged in the Battle of Passchendaele in West Flanders. The band performed at least two concerts a day accompanied by the Regimental mascot, led by Pte. Hazen M. Fraser(1900 - 1971). On 27 Sept 1917, Sable Chief was photographed in the Forecourt at Buckingham Palace with L.L. Worthington after the bandmaster had been decorated with the Royal Victorian Medal by George V.

The next month, Sable Chief accompanied the band and a detachment from the 2nd Battalion of the Newfoundland Regiment to march in the procession at the Lord Mayor's Day show on 9 Nov 1917 in London. The detachment of more than fifty men was led by Major John W. March, M.C.

The mascot attended the Freedom of the City ceremony in spring 1918 with the Guard of the Royal Newfoundland Regiment and Lt. Col. B.J. Barton, D.S.O. at Winchester, England during an inspection by The Duke of Connaught and Strathearn.

In spring 1919, a vehicle struck and killed Sable Chief in the road at Hazeley Down Camp, and he was given to a taxidermist for posterity. Currently, other than his pelt, it is not known where the remains are located. Sailor became the next mascot of the Newfoundland Regiment.

Initially, Sable Chief was on display in the office of Sir Edgar Rennie Bowring (1858–1943), the first High Commissioner of Newfoundland to the United Kingdom (London, England). When The High Commission was abolished in 1934 after Newfoundland began self-government and its dominion status was suspended, the mascot was shipped to the Great War Veterans Association of Newfoundland. After Confederation, it was placed on display in the Canadian Legion Club where veterans were permitted to pet its head and coat. For decades, Sable Chief was posed in military-related photographs.

His legend continued to resonate with Newfoundlanders over time. A London Times photograph of Sable Chief inspired the production of souvenir ornaments by a disabled veteran in 1950.

In Sept 1964, on the 50th Anniversary of the departure from St. John's of the first contingent of Royal Newfoundland Regiment, Sable Chief was placed on a carpeted platform in the observatory of the Confederation Building (St. John's, NL) as part of the WW1 collection for the opening of the military museum, officiated by Mary, Princess Royal and Countess of Harewood. Over time, the condition of his pelt deteriorated and he was moved to a storage facility.

Judy Ferguson initiated a fundraising campaign and on 28 Jun 2006, she presented a check to curators for the restoration of Sable Chief to enable him to be viewed again by the public. Significant work was completed on his pelt, and he was placed inside a sealed clear case for further protection. Sable Chief is currently on display at The Rooms, the Provincial Museum of Newfoundland and Labrador (St. John's, NL).

His handler, Pte. Hazen M. Fraser went on to live with his future wife Hope and two sons, and his sons expressing pride over his work with Sable Chief during the war.
