= Edgar Bowring =

Edgar Bowring may refer to:

- Edgar Alfred Bowring (1826–1911), British author and translator
- Sir Edgar Rennie Bowring (1858–1943), Newfoundland businessman and politician
