= Admiralty House, Mount Pearl =

Coordinates: 47°30′17.12″N 52°47′41.03″W

Admiralty House Museum & Archives
- Established: 1997
- Location: 365 Old Placentia Road, Mount Pearl, Newfoundland and Labrador
- Type: Communications Museum
- Website: http://www.admiraltymuseum.ca/

Admiralty House is a one-storey, wooden gable-roofed, municipally-designated heritage building originally built as a wireless communications station in Mount Pearl, Newfoundland and Labrador, Canada. It currently serves as a museum and archives. The building is purported to be the last standing of 11 such identical stations built around the world during the First World War.

== Early land use ==
The building sits on land developed by early settlers James Pearl and Lady Anne Pearl.

== HM wireless station ==
In 1914, the site was selected by the British Admiralty for a First World War communications post. It was constructed in 1915 by the Marconi Telegraph Company to serve the Royal Navy. It was built to intercept secret German naval transmissions, track icebergs, and track ships in distress:

The Admiralty designated H.M. Wireless Station at Mount Pearl as its North Atlantic Intelligence Centre. Members of the Marconi Company were recruited in to the British Navy and sent to work in the wireless station under the command of Officer Lieutenant G.L.J. Wolley. In comparison to other wireless stations in Newfoundland during that time, the H.M. Wireless station was among the most powerful, employing state-of-the-art equipment that allowed transmission and reception of signals over 1000 miles away.

The station was guarded by members of the Newfoundland Royal Naval Reserve.

On February 24, 1918, the HM Wireless Station received the distress signal from the SS Florizel, which had run aground near Cappahayden. The message read "S.O.S. Florizel ashore near Cape Race. Fast going to pieces." The station relayed the message to the Bowring Brothers shipping agent and rescue ships were prepared.

The station was dismantled in 1925 and the property was put up for auction.

== Farm and office use ==
The property was sold in 1927 to Heber Parsons, who converted the wireless station into a farm house. The three 305 foot towers were used by the newly formed VONF radio station. In 1967 the property was sold to a housing development named Admiralty Wood. Later, it served as the offices for the local Housing Corporation.

== Admiralty House museum and archives ==
In the 1990s, the City of Mount Pearl acquired the wireless station to rehabilitate and restore as a community facility and work began to the designs of architect William MacCallum:

The exterior work consisted of a new roof, clapboard and the restoration of the large veranda. The wing that originally housed the commander of the station was stripped revealing an original chimney and fireplace, and a mantel was found to replicate the original. During this time the interior walls were found to be built of wattle and daub a method of wall construction consisting of branches or reeds roughly plastered over. The interior roof trusses bearing the inscription RN, for the Royal Navy were exposed opening the interior which is now used as display space. Restoration refurbishment was carried out under the supervision of Master Carpenter Howard Roberts.

The restoration cost was reported in 1996 as $700,000. Admiralty House Museum and Archives opened in the building in 1997. The site was officially opened by the H.R.M. Duke of Edinburgh on 23 June 1997. Since then, the building has housed a museum, with exhibits on the history of Mount Pearl, Guglielmo Marconi and wireless communications, the wreck of SS Florizel, and HMS Calypso (later HMS Briton), a training ship for the Newfoundland Royal Naval Reserve before and during World War I. The museum also house several collections and fonds detailing life in early 20th Century Canada. These include photos and documents from both World Wars. The Museum is affiliated with: CMA, CHIN, and Virtual Museum of Canada.

In 2018, the museum halted construction work in its parking lot area when excavation revealed the footings of one of the original Marconi towers. In 2019, it partnered with local Landwash Brewery to brew a commemorative ale to mark the community's role in the 1919 transatlantic Daily Mail aviation prize. The ale was premiered at the launch of an exhibit detailing the story of the transatlantic air race from the perspective of St. John's socialite and photographer Margaret Carter.
