= Victor Gordon (Newfoundland) =

Newfoundland military officer and diplomat

Captain Victor Gordon CMG
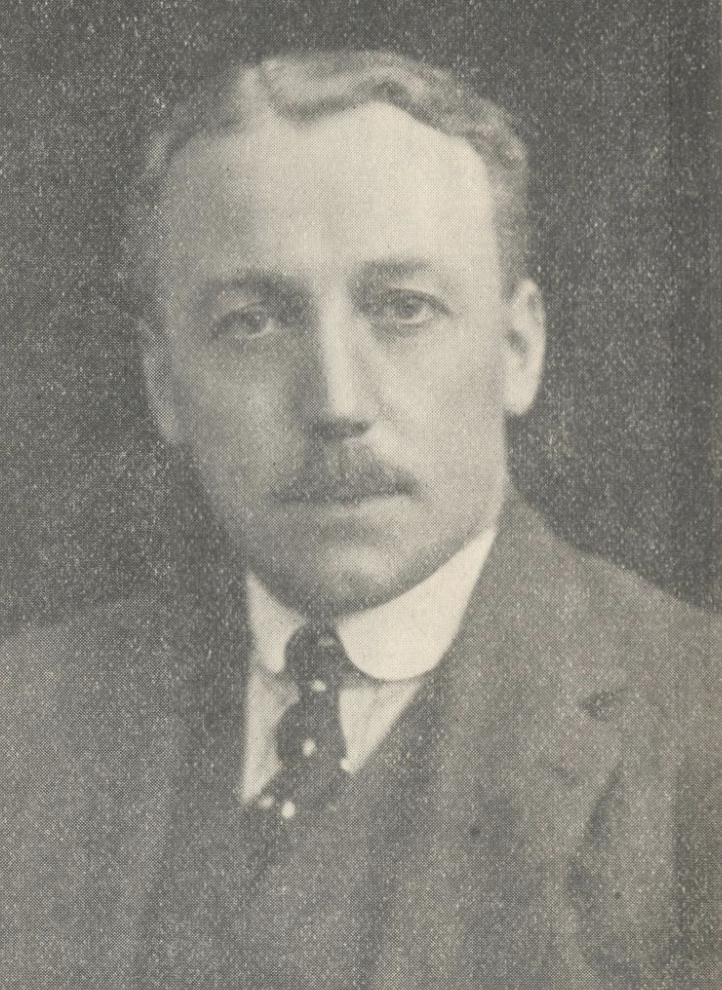
- Gordon in 1927

2nd High Commissioner of Newfoundland to the United Kingdom
- In office 1923 – October 6, 1928
- Preceded by: Edgar Rennie Bowring
- Succeeded by: W. Hutchings (acting)

Personal details
- Born: June 28, 1884 St. John's, Newfoundland Colony
- Died: October 6, 1928 (aged 44) London, England
- Resting place: General Protestant Cemetery

Captain Victor Gordon, CMG (June 28, 1884 – October 6, 1928) was a Newfoundland military officer and public servant. He served as High Commissioner of Newfoundland to the United Kingdom from 1924 until his death four years later.

== Early life and military service ==
Gordon was born in St. John's as the youngest son of merchant James Gordon. He received business training with the Bank of Montreal and pursued a legal education in London, where he was called to the English bar by the Middle Temple in 1912.

Gordon enlisted for the First World War in 1914 and served in Gallipoli, Egypt, and France. He was a temporary captain with the King's Own Scottish Borderers when he was severely wounded at Monchy-le-Preux in 1917.

== Diplomatic service ==
In 1919, Gordon was appointed secretary to the Newfoundland High Commissioner to the United Kingdom. He became acting high commissioner in 1922, and was formally appointed high commissioner in 1924. In recognition of his service, Gordon was appointed a CMG in 1926. He died in London in 1928 from the effects of his war wounds.
