= Peter Pan statue =

Sculpture by George Frampton in Kensington Gardens, London

Coordinates: 51.5086°N 0.1759°W

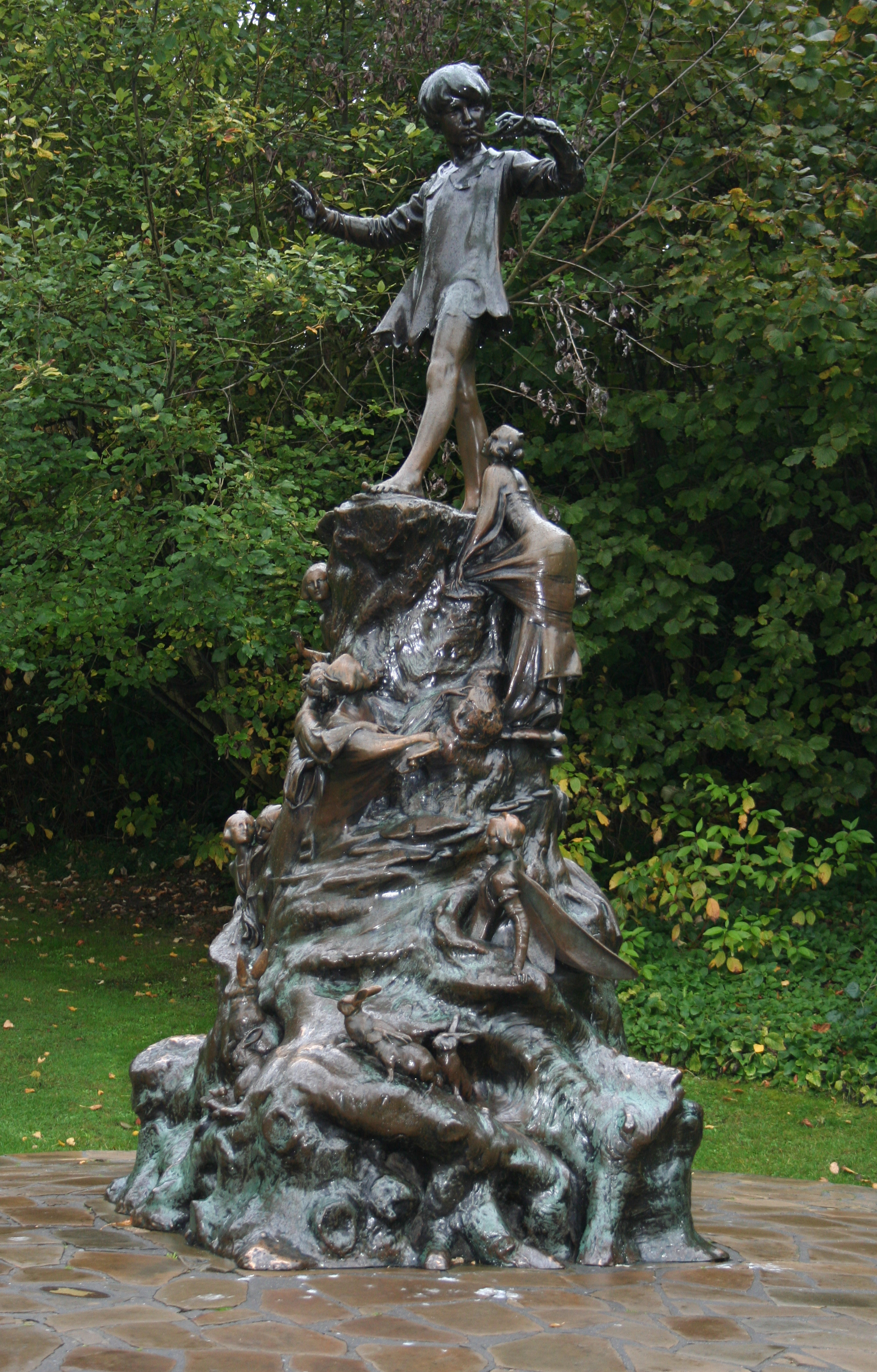
Statue in Kensington Gardens

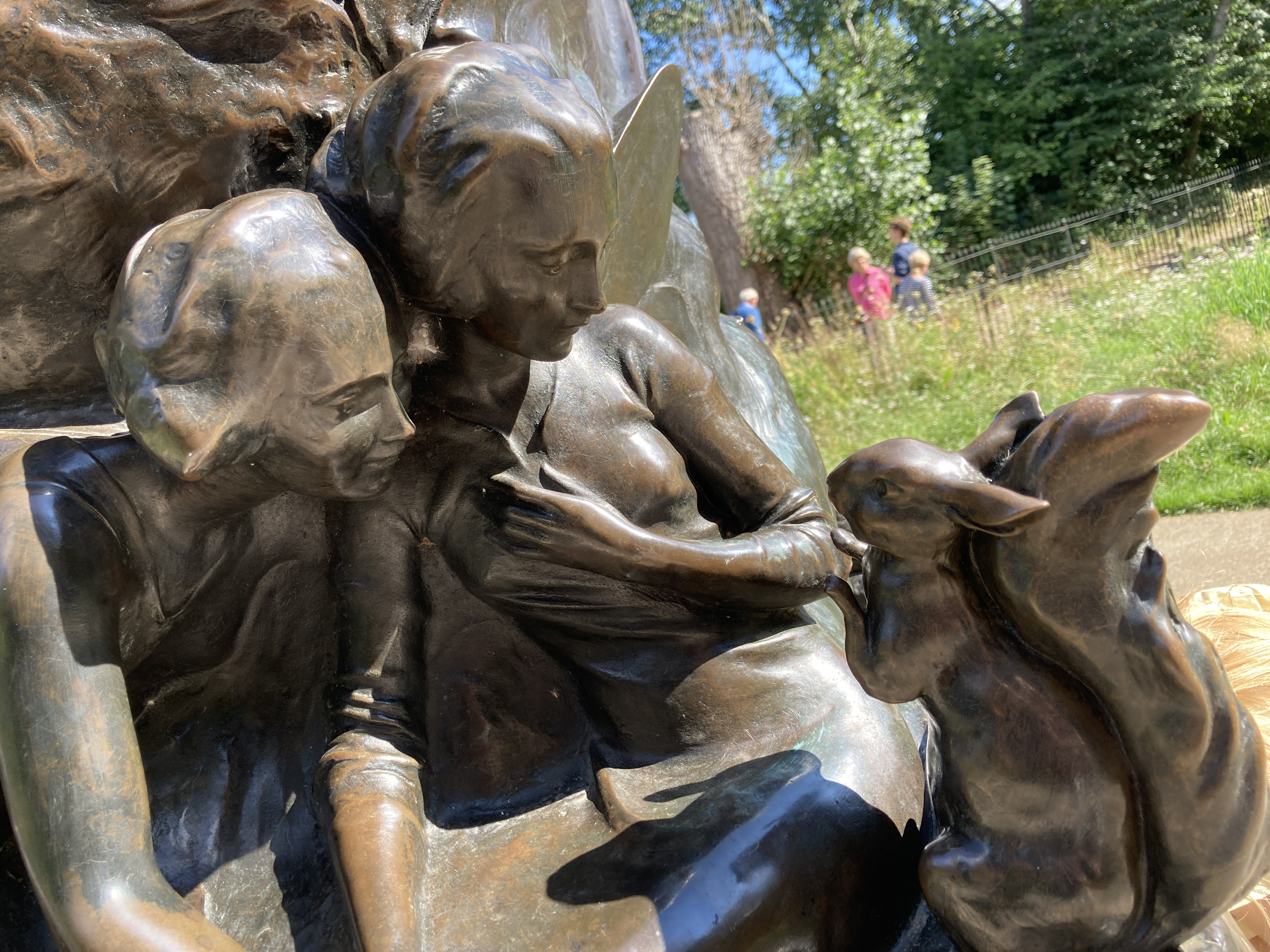
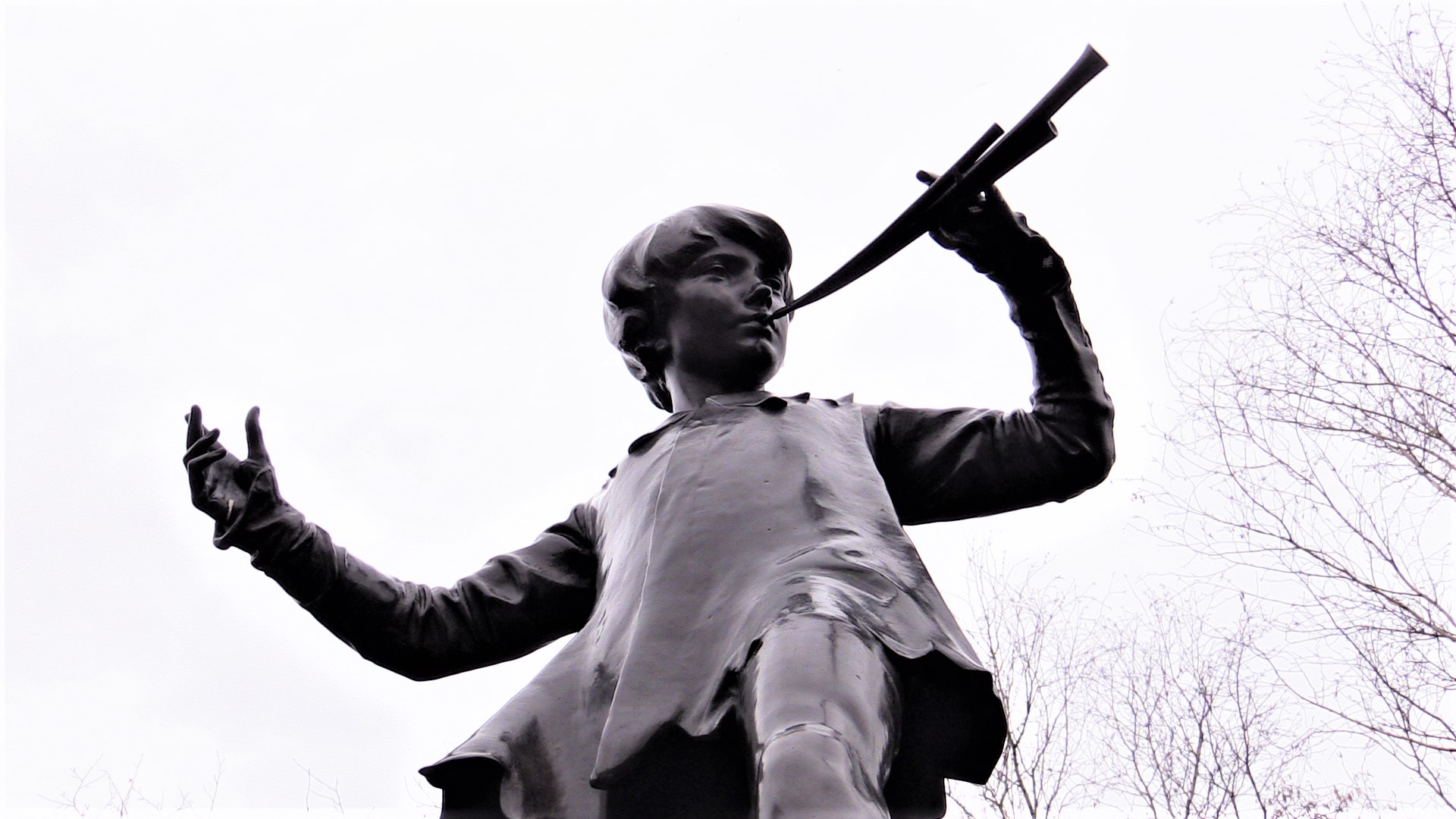
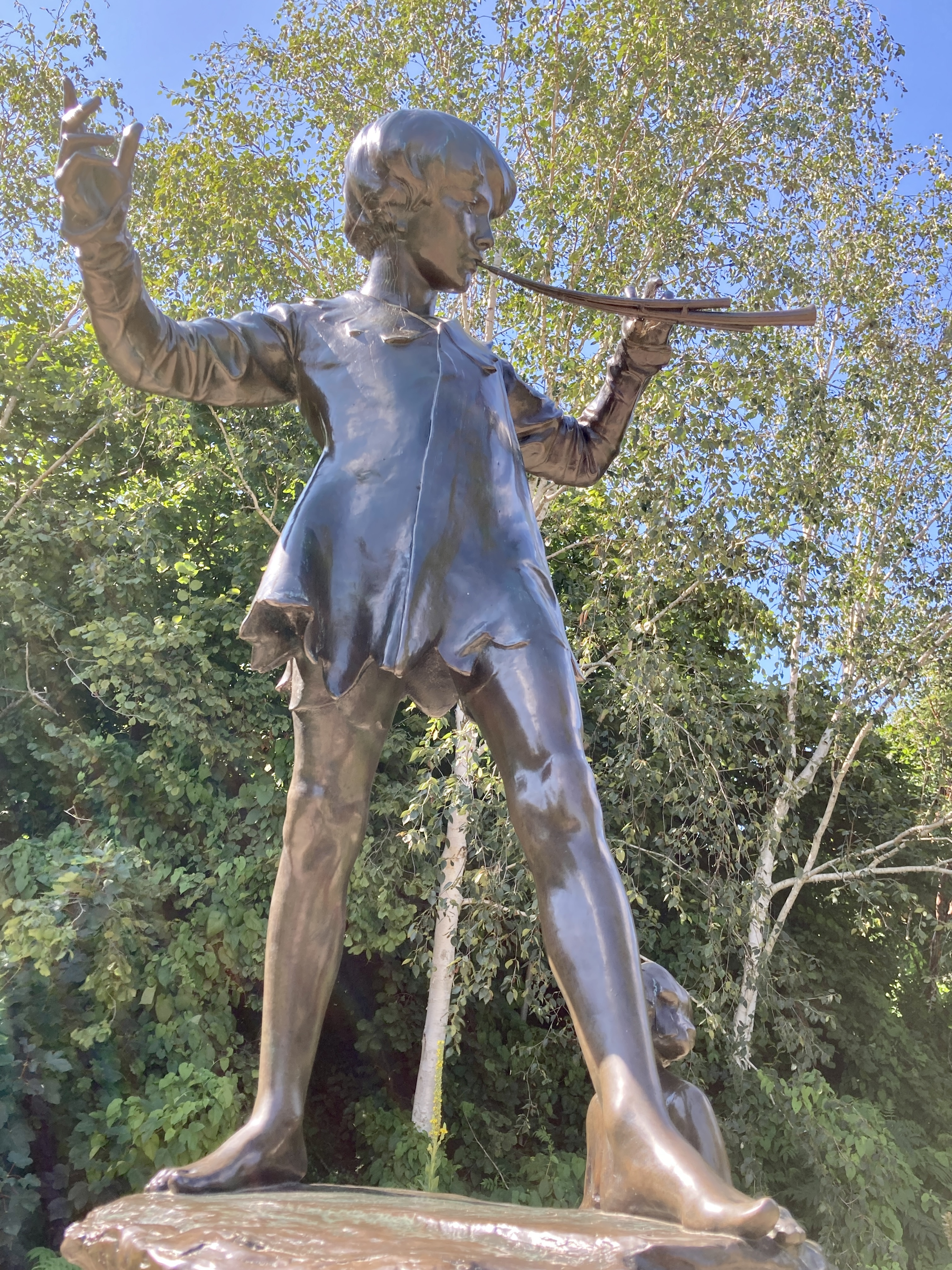
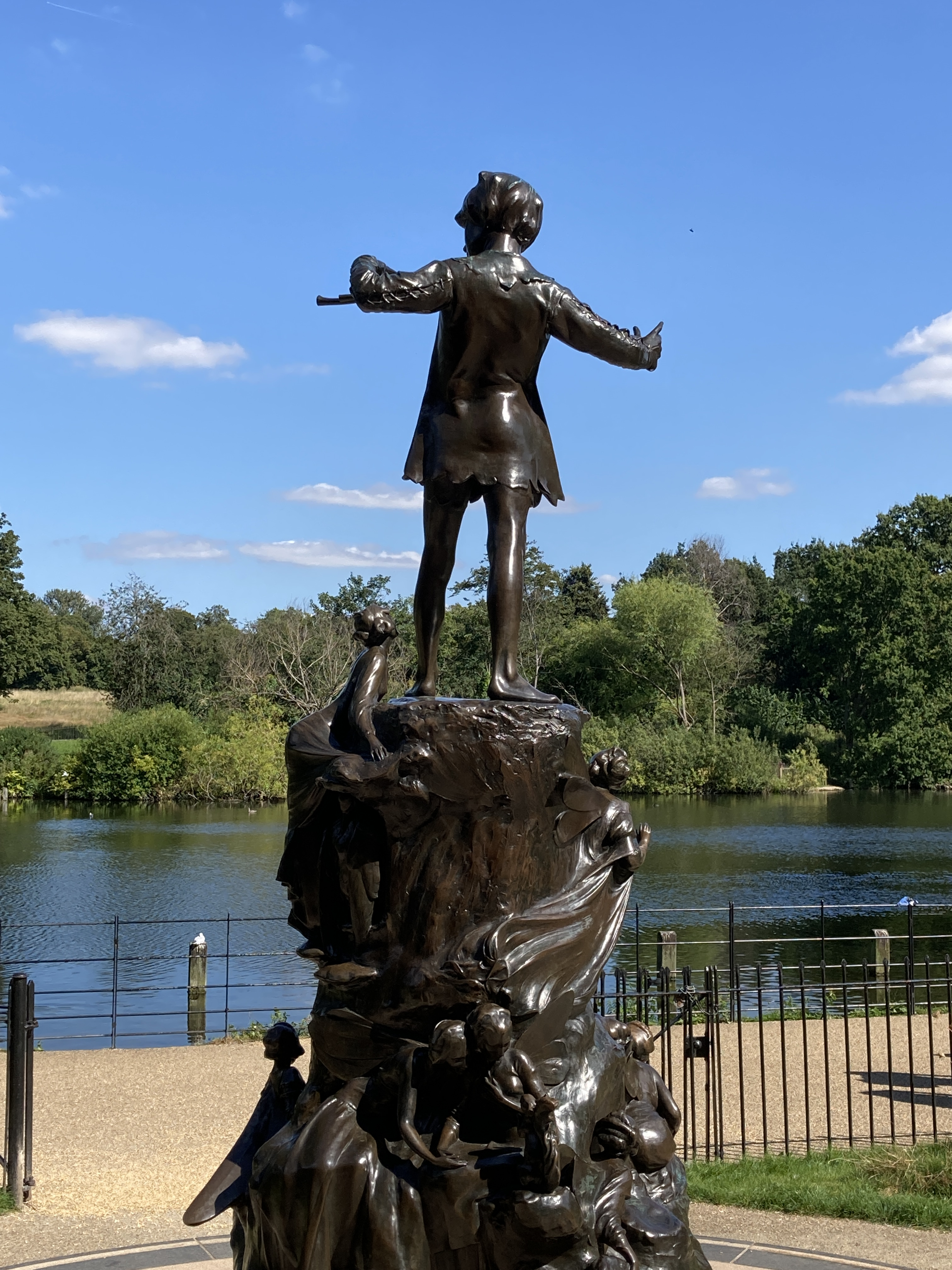
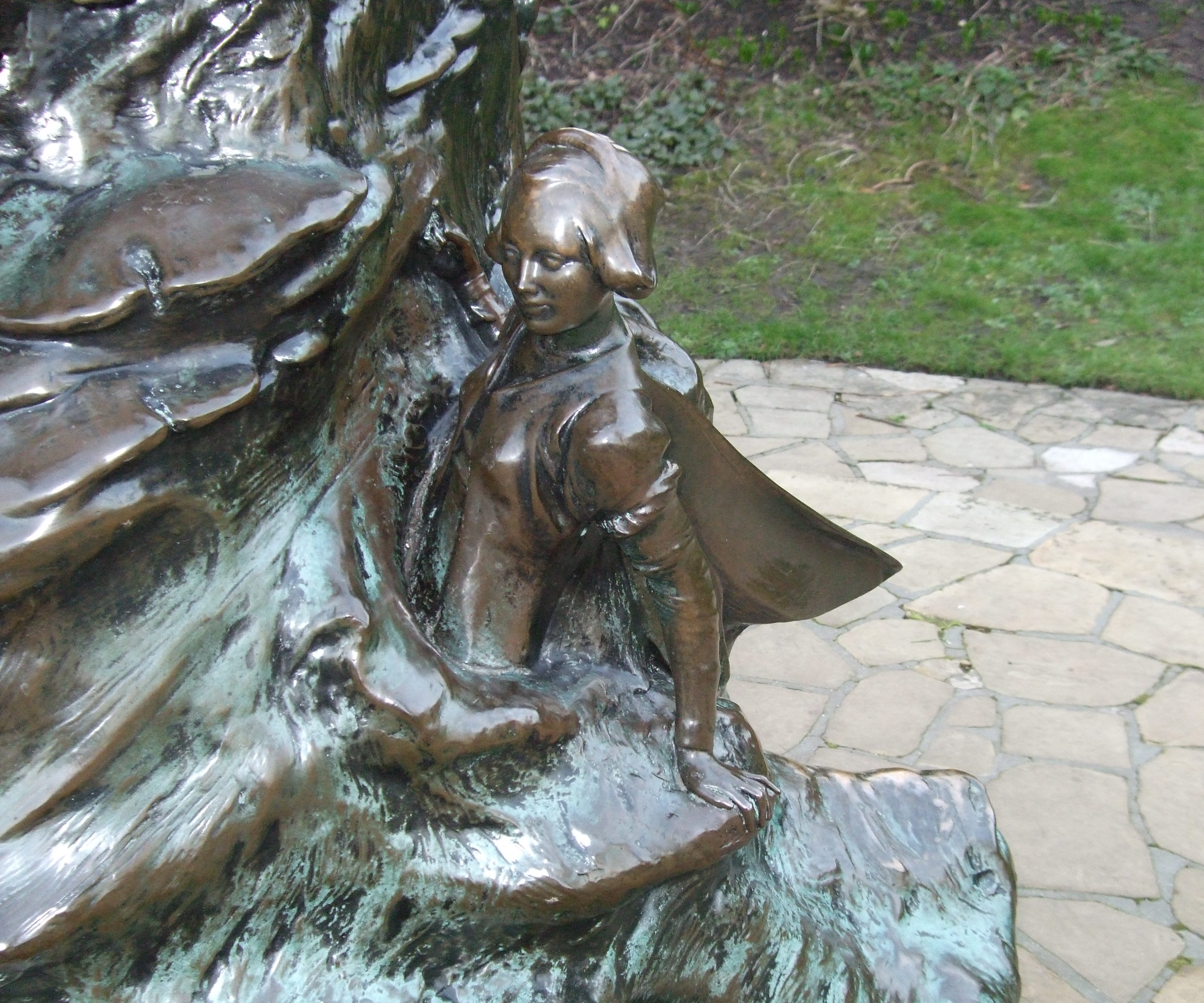
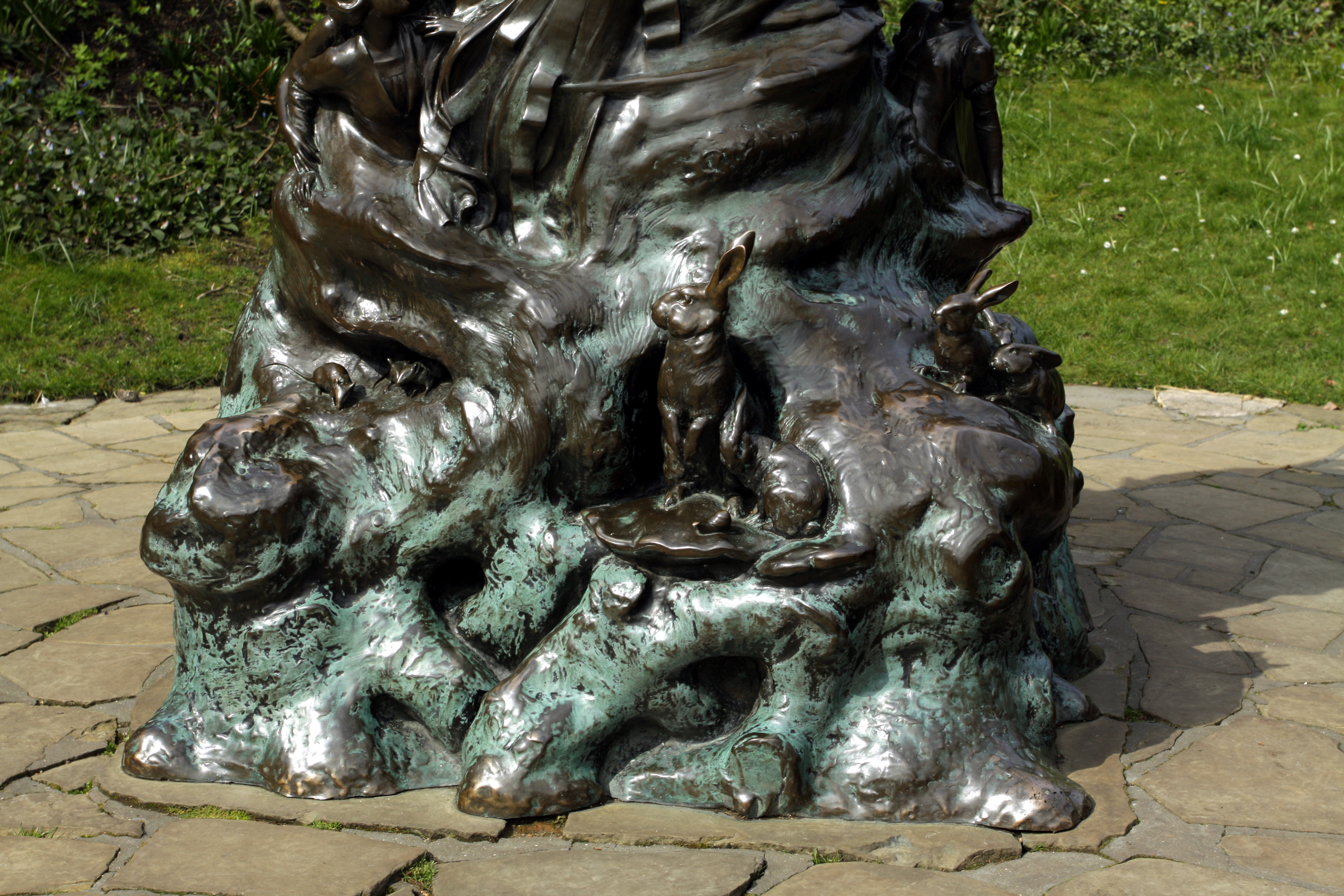
Detail of the sculpture

Audio description of the statue by Susan Greenfield

The statue of Peter Pan is a 1912 bronze sculpture of J. M. Barrie's character Peter Pan. It was commissioned by Barrie and made by Sir George Frampton. The original statue is displayed in Kensington Gardens in London, to the west of The Long Water, close to Barrie's former home on Bayswater Road. Barrie's stories were inspired in part by the gardens: the statue is at the place where Peter Pan lands in Barrie's 1902 book The Little White Bird after flying out of his nursery. Six other casts made by Frampton have been erected in other places around the world.

== Statue in Kensington Gardens ==
The sculpture stands about 14 feet (4.3 m) high. It has a tall conical form, like a tree stump, topped by a young boy, about life size for an eight-year-old, blowing a thin musical instrument like a trumpet or flute, sometimes interpreted as pan pipes. The sides of the stump are decorated with small figures of squirrels, rabbits, mice, and fairies. Barrie had intended the boy to be based on a photograph of Michael Llewelyn Davies wearing a Peter Pan costume, but Frampton chose another model, perhaps George Goss or William A. Harwood. Barrie was disappointed by the results, claiming the statue "didn't show the Devil in Peter".

Barrie had the original bronze erected in Kensington Gardens on 30 April 1912, without fanfare and without permission, so that it might appear to children that the fairies had put it in place overnight. He published a notice in The Times newspaper the following day, 1 May: "There is a surprise in store for the children who go to Kensington Gardens to feed the ducks in the Serpentine this morning. Down by the little bay on the south-western side of the tail of the Serpentine they will find a May-day gift by Mr J.M. Barrie, a figure of Peter Pan blowing his pipe on the stump of a tree, with fairies and mice and squirrels all around. It is the work of Sir George Frampton, and the bronze figure of the boy who would never grow up is delightfully conceived."

He gave the sculpture to the city of London. Some critics objected to his advertising his works by erecting a sculpture in a public park without permission. In 1928, vandals tarred and feathered the sculpture. It became a Grade II* listed building in 1970. Royal Parks replaced the plinth in 2019, which caused some controversy.

== Other casts ==
Frampton made a series of small bronze reproductions of the Peter Pan figure from 1913 to his death in 1928. Some were sold at Bonham's in March and November 2015, and one was sold in Scotland in 2016 for £60,000. Frampton made six other full-size casts from the original moulds, which stand in the following places:

- Egmont Park, in Brussels, given to the Belgian state by Frampton in 1924 to recognise the Anglo-Belgian friendship during the First World War; it suffered bullet damage in the Second World War, and was listed as a Belgian historical monument in 1975.
- Bowring Park, in St. John's, Newfoundland, erected on 29 August 1925, as a tribute to Betty Munn, the daughter of John Shannon Munn, who had died aged three on 23 February 1918 in the sinking of SS Florizel.
- Sefton Park, in Liverpool, unveiled in June 1928, with the participation of Pauline Chase who reprised her role of Peter Pan for the opening. It was Grade II listed in 1985 and moved to the Palm House in 1990. Over the years, it had been vandalised several times but in 2005, it was fully restored.
- Queens Gardens, in Perth, Western Australia, erected overnight on 10 June 1929, and given by Rotary International to the Perth City Council to celebrate the centenary of the state of Western Australia (founded in 1829 as Swan River Colony).
- Toronto, Ontario, Canada; erected on 14 September 1929 by the College Heights Association in a park that became known as "Peter Pan Park", which was later named Glenn Gould Park.
- The grounds of Rutgers University, Camden, New Jersey, by Eldridge R. Johnson in 1929, outside the Walt Whitman Arts Center.
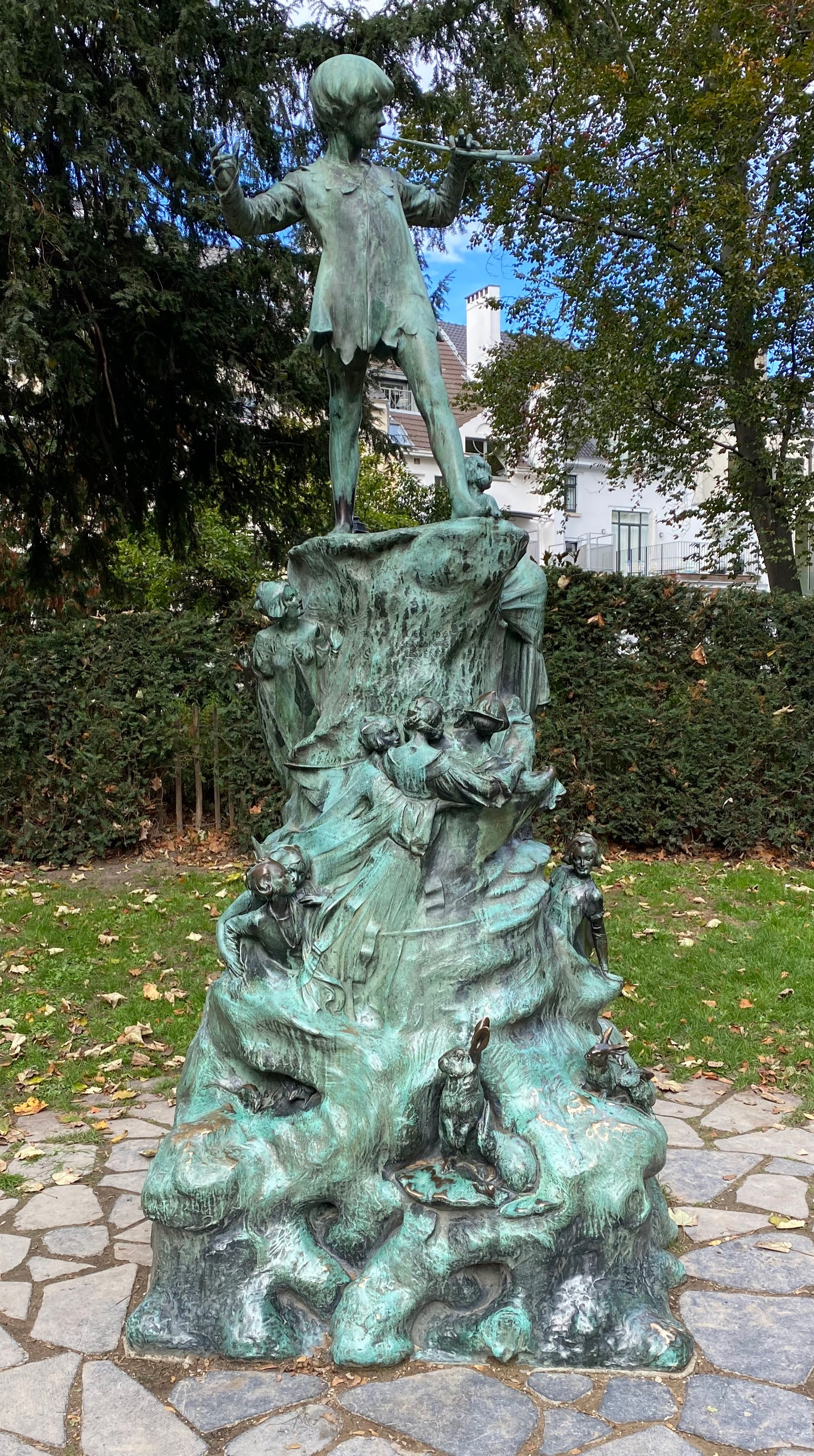
Egmont Park, Brussels

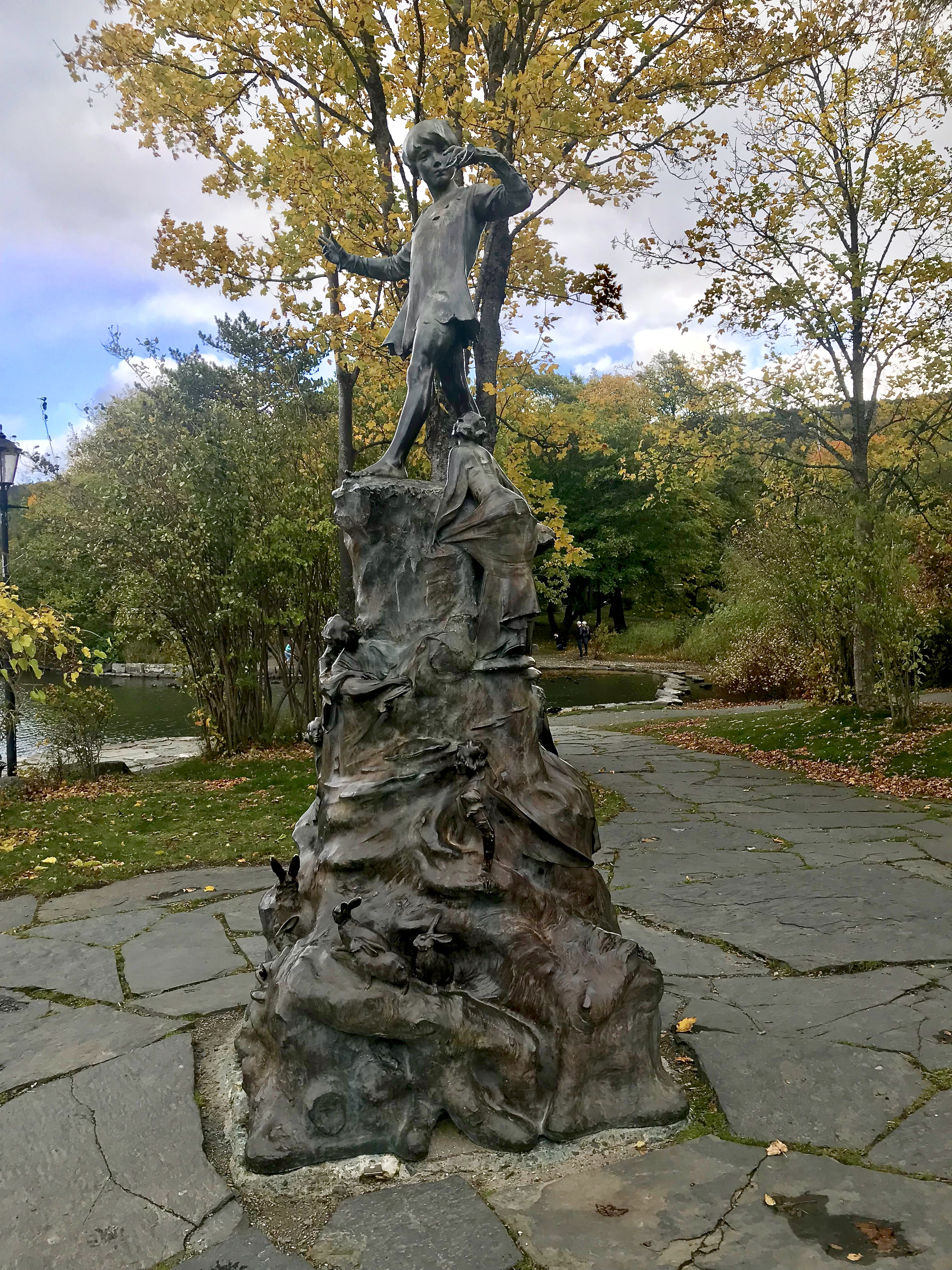
Bowring Park, St. John's, Newfoundland

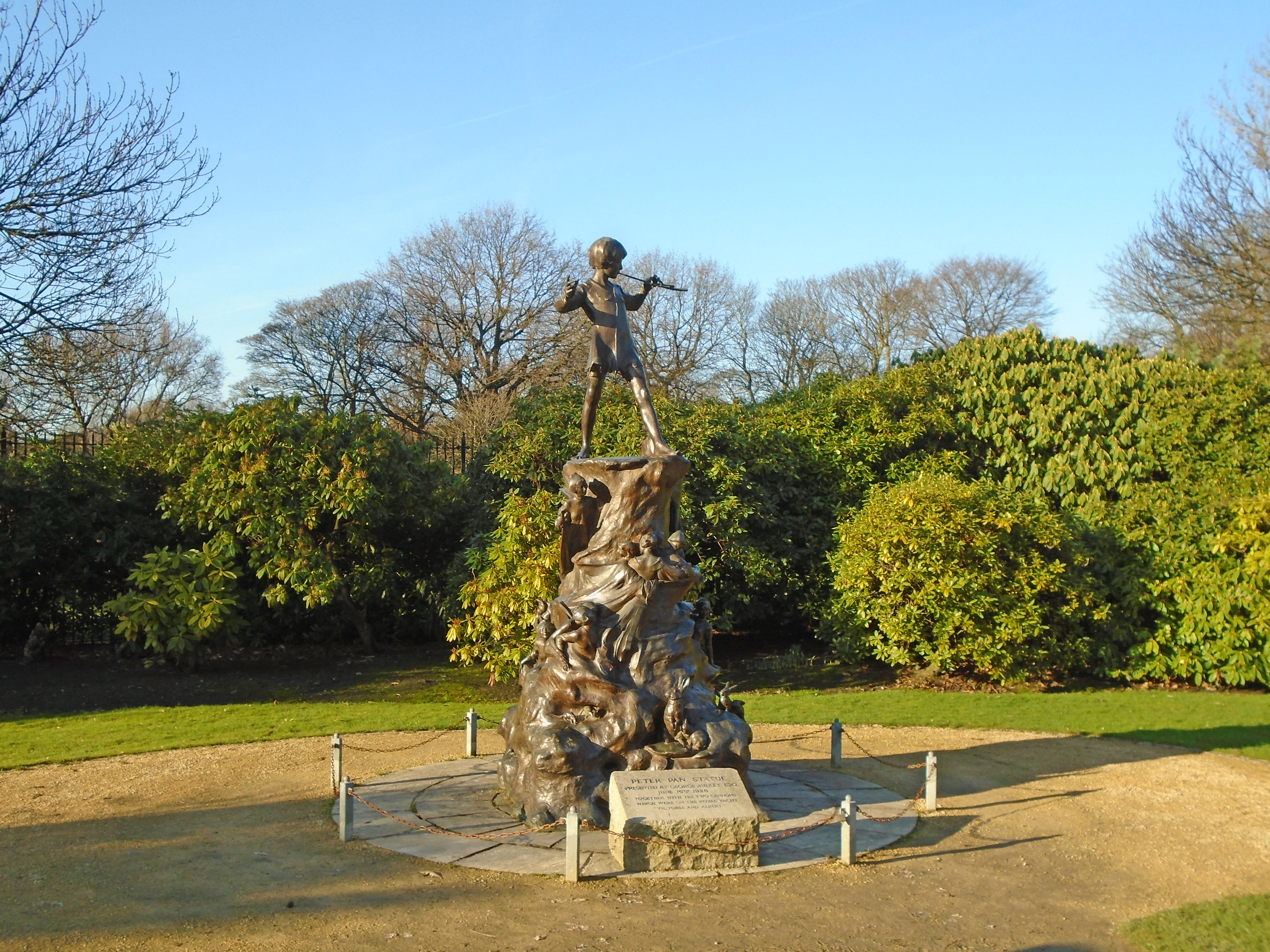
Sefton Park, Liverpool

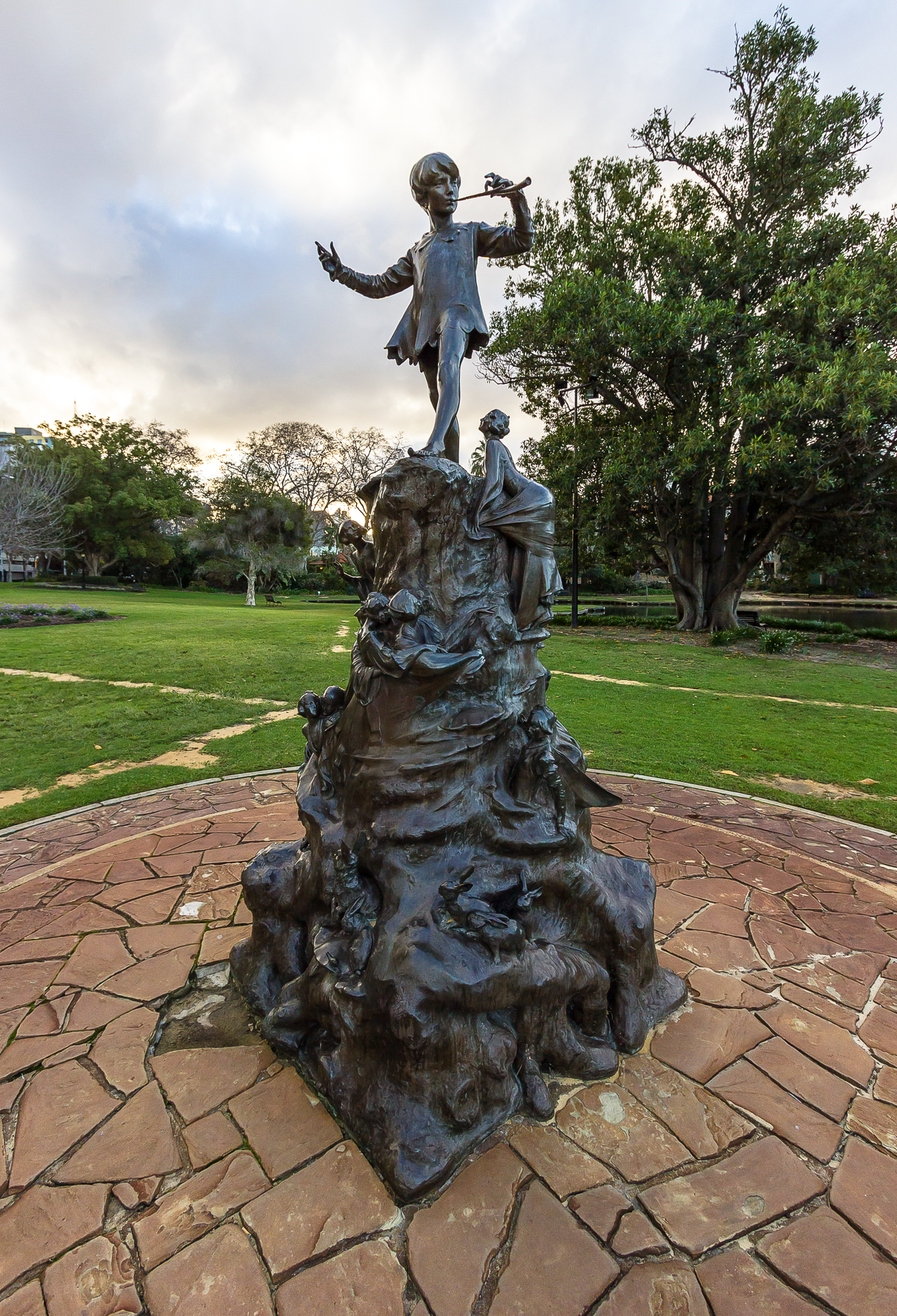
Queens Gardens, Perth, Western Australia

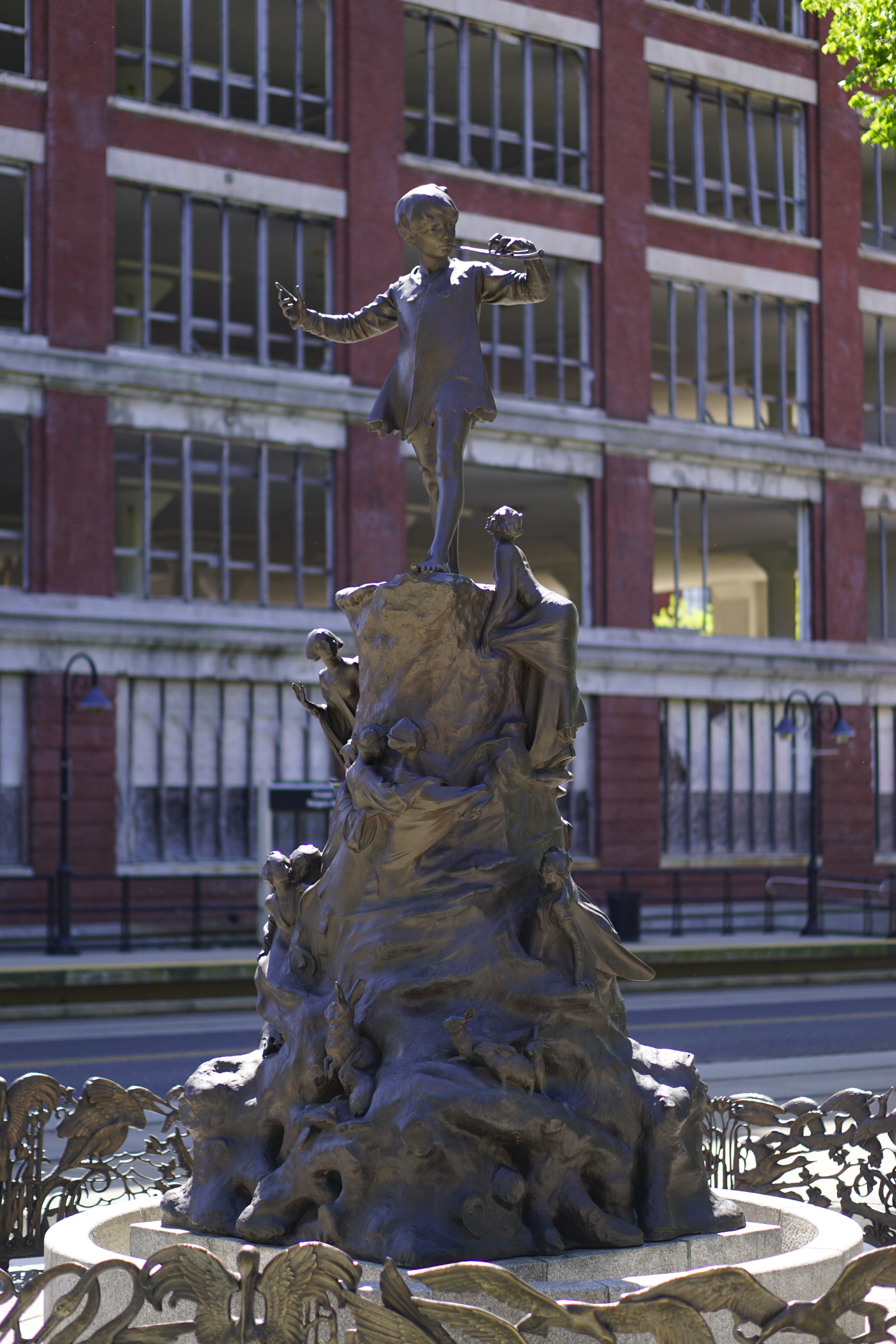
Johnson's Park, Camden, New Jersey

== See also ==
- Peter Pan in Kensington Gardens, 1906 novel
- Peter Pan (Columbus, Ohio)
