= Edgar Rennie Bowring =

Newfoundland businessman and politician (1858–1943)

The Honourable Sir Edgar R. Bowring MLC
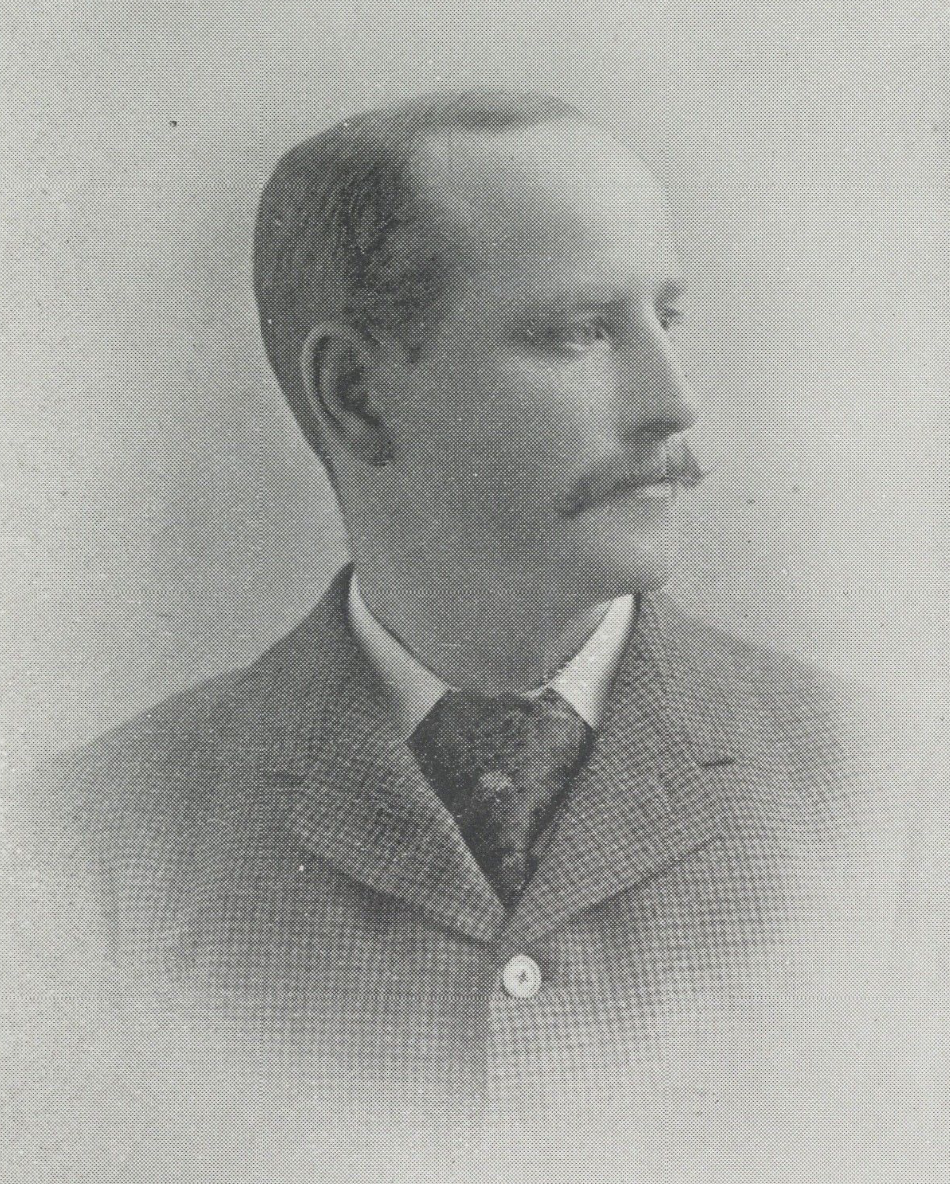
- Bowring in 1894

1st High Commissioner of Newfoundland to the United Kingdom
- In office 1932 – February 16, 1934
- Preceded by: Daniel James Davies
- Succeeded by: Position abolished
- In office November 22, 1918 – 1922
- Preceded by: Position established
- Succeeded by: Victor Gordon

Member of the Legislative Council of Newfoundland
- In office 1898–1908
- Appointed by: James S. Winter

Personal details
- Born: August 17, 1858 St. John's, Newfoundland Colony
- Died: June 23, 1943 (aged 84) London, England
- Spouse: Flora Clift (m. 1888–1939)
- Relations: John S. Munn (step-son); Benjamin Bowring (grandfather); Charles R. Bowring (cousin)

Sir Edgar Rennie Bowring (August 17, 1858 – June 23, 1943) was a Newfoundland businessman, politician, and philanthropist. He served on the Legislative Council of Newfoundland from 1898 to 1908, and he was both the first and last High Commissioner of Newfoundland to the United Kingdom from 1918 to 1922 and again from 1932 to 1934. Bowring is most well-known as the namesake of Bowring Park, which he bestowed to the city of St. John's in 1914.

== Business career and politics ==
Bowring was born in St. John's, Newfoundland as the son of John Bowring and Mary Broom (née Rennie). After graduating from Bishop Feild College, he worked at the family business, becoming the director of Bowring Brothers after the death of his cousin Charles R. Bowring in 1890. Bowring had married Flora Munn (née Clift) in 1888. They had no children together, but he raised her step-son John Shannon Munn.

Bowring was appointed to the Legislative Council of Newfoundland in 1898 by Premier James S. Winter, where he served for ten years. He was knighted in 1915. In 1918, Bowring served as Newfoundland's High Commissioner to the United Kingdom. He was also the Dominion's last commissioner before the legislature abolished self-government in 1934.

Bowring was responsible for the creation of Bowring Park in St. John's, Newfoundland. His stepson and protege, John Shannon Munn, and stepgrandchild, Betty Munn, died in the wreck of the SS Florizel in 1918, and in her memory he had a statue of Peter Pan erected in the park. Additionally, he donated The Fighting Newfoundlander monument, which was dedicated in the park in 1922, to the city of St. John's.

Bowring died on June 23, 1943 in London, England.
