= Queens Gardens, Perth =

Park in Perth, Western Australia

Coordinates: 31°57′34″S 115°52′36″E

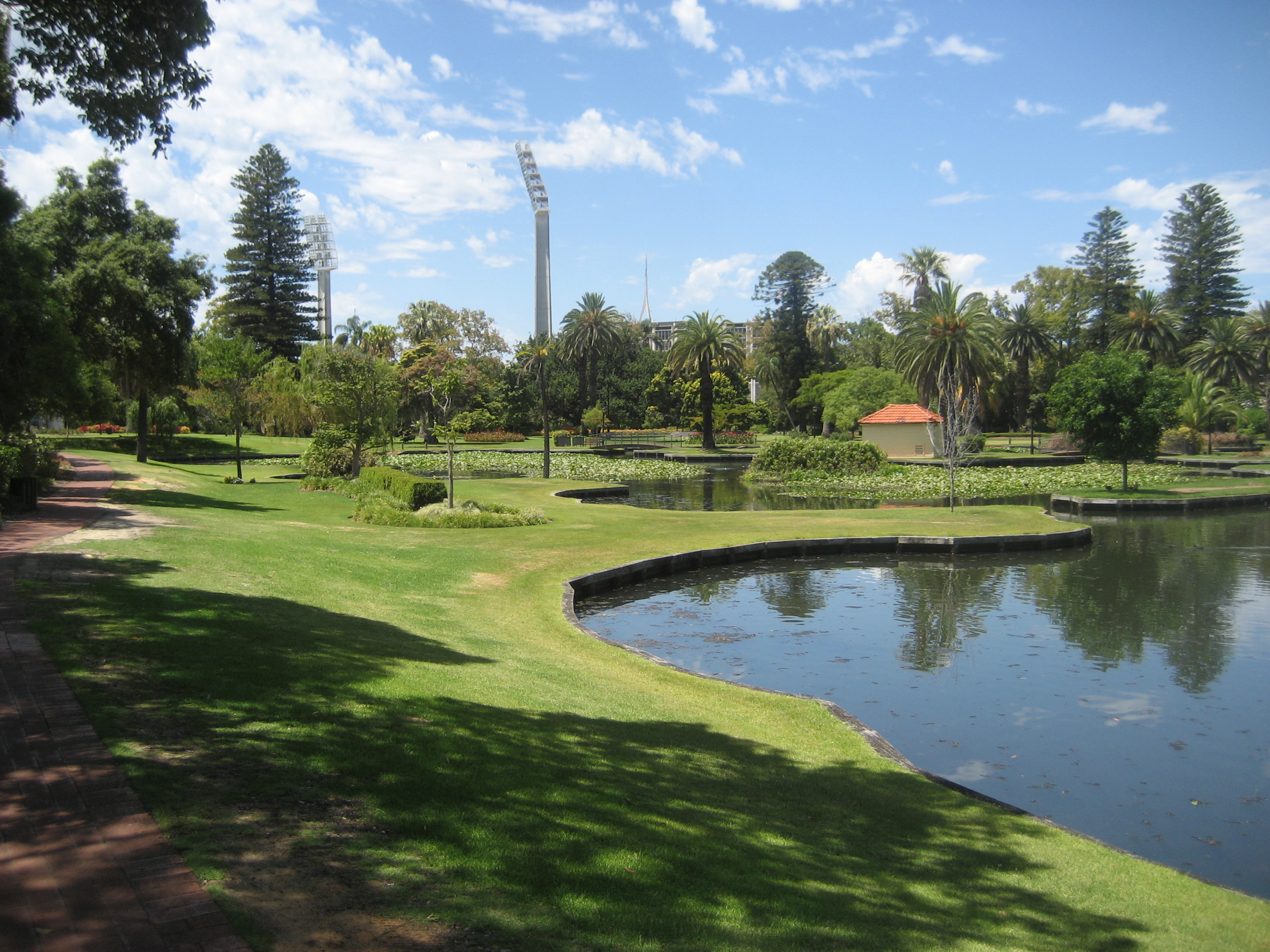
Queens Gardens in 2011

Queens Gardens, Perth, is a 3.3-hectare (8.2-acre) park on a former brickworks and clay pit site in the eastern end of the Perth central business district. The park is bounded by Hay Street to the south, Plain Street to the west, Nelson Crescent to the north, and Hale Street to the east, which separates it from the WACA Ground.

== History ==
The site of Queen's Gardens was initially part of the commonage that was used for recreation purposes including horse racing and later as a clay pit and brickworks. Bricks were produced from the site between 1860 and 1890 and featured in many of Perth's prominent buildings constructed at that time, including the Town Hall, The Cloisters and The Barracks. At this time the place was known as the East Perth Clayfields Reserve. Between 1880 and 1890 there were a number of public protests against the use of the site for clay pits, which resulted in the City of Perth partially filling the clay pits to form ponds and the site being transferred to the city for the purpose of establishing a botanic garden.

The park was opened to the public on 9 October 1898; however, it was officially opened and formally named the Queens Gardens by Mayor of Perth Alexander Forrest in October 1899.

In the years before the first world war, it was used as a garden party location by the mayor of Perth; more recently it has been popular for open-air weddings and wedding portraiture.

The park was officially transferred to the Perth City Council on 21 January 1902. In 1906, the city erected a caretaker's cottage in the north-east corner of the garden. New entrance gates were erected in 1914 and eight new bridges constructed in place of previous ones. Following the installation of electric lighting in 1924, use of the gardens extended into the evenings. In 1927 new entrance gates were installed at the corner of Hay and Plain streets, replacing the original entrance towards the eastern end of Hay Street.

== Peter Pan statue ==
The Peter Pan statue in Queens Gardens

In June 1929 the Rotary Club of Perth presented the Perth City Council with a replica of the Peter Pan statue in Kensington Gardens in London as a gift to the children of Western Australia to mark the state's centenary. The reproduction was created by the sculptor of the original statue, George Frampton, and autographed by J. M. Barrie, the creator of Peter Pan.

== Notting Hill bench ==
The park includes a bench that is a replica of the seat in the 1999 film Notting Hill, donated to the City of Perth by a resident known only as Rodd. It has the inscription:

For June who loved this garden
From Joseph who always sat beside her

Until 2019, it was believed to be the original bench from the film, and included a plaque to that effect. The plaque has since been removed.

== See also ==
- Australia's Open Garden Scheme
- Gardening in Australia
- Heritage gardens in Australia
