= SS Florizel =

Passenger liner

Coordinates: 46°50′56″N 52°56′20″W

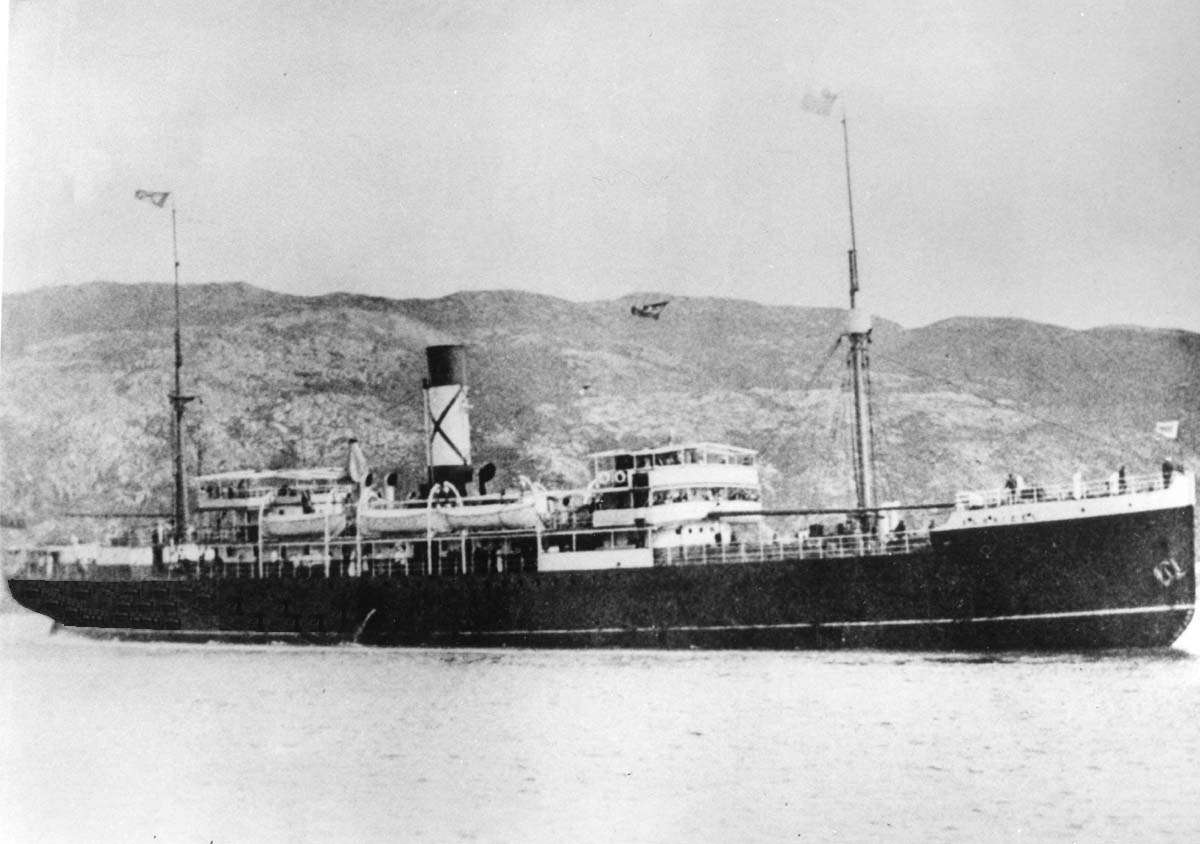
- Florizel arriving St. John's harbour

History

Newfoundland
- Namesake: Florizel of The Winter's Tale
- Owner: Bowring Brothers
- Operator: Red Cross Line
- Builder: C. O'Connell & Company Ltd.; at Glasgow
- Launched: 26 November 1908
- Commissioned: 1909
- Home port: St. John's, Newfoundland
- Fate: Sank after striking reef at Cappahayden, Newfoundland

General characteristics
- Tonnage: 3,081 tons gross register; 1,980 tons net register
- Length: 305.5 ft (93.1 m)
- Beam: 43.1 ft (13.1 m)
- Depth: 29.6 ft (9.0 m)
- Propulsion: Steel Screw Steamer
- Speed: 12 Knots
- Capacity: 145 First Class; 36 Second Class
- Notes: Safety Equipment: submarine signaling apparatus and wireless

SS Florizel, was a passenger liner, the flagship of the Bowring Brothers' Red Cross Line of steamships and one of the first ships in the world specifically designed to navigate icy waters. During her last voyage, from St. John's to New York City, via Halifax, she sank after striking a reef at Horn Head Point, near Cappahayden, Newfoundland, with the loss of 94 including Betty Munn, a three-year-old girl, in whose memory a statue of Peter Pan was erected at Bowring Park in St. John's.

== History ==
Bowring Brothers were the operators for the New York, Newfoundland and Halifax Steamship Company, Limited. The Bowring fleet of ships of that era were given names from Shakespearean plays: Florizel was named after young Prince Florizel in The Winter's Tale. Florizel was primarily a passenger liner, built for the Bowring Brothers to replace an earlier ship, SS Silvia, which had been lost at sea. At the time of Florizel's construction she was considered a luxury liner; she had room for 145 first-class accommodations.

She was one of the first ships in the world to be specifically designed to navigate the icy waters around Newfoundland, in what is now present-day Canada. The vessel was modified each spring to participate in the annual seal hunt, an additional source of income. She was built of steel and had a rounded bow and almost a flat bottom, to enable her to slide up on an ice floe and break through. Often captained by Captain Abram Kean, she participated in the rescue of sealers during the Great 1914 Newfoundland Sealing Disaster and she broke many records on her numerous voyages to the seal hunt.

Florizel was also used as a transport vessel during World War I. Before its conversion into a troopship, the sealing steamer only accommodated 50 crew and 250 passengers. In October 1914 she carried the first 540 volunteers of the Newfoundland Regiment, the Blue Puttees. She joined a fleet of 33 Atlantic liners and six Royal Navy warships, to form the largest contingent of troops to cross the Atlantic for Europe.

== Last voyage ==
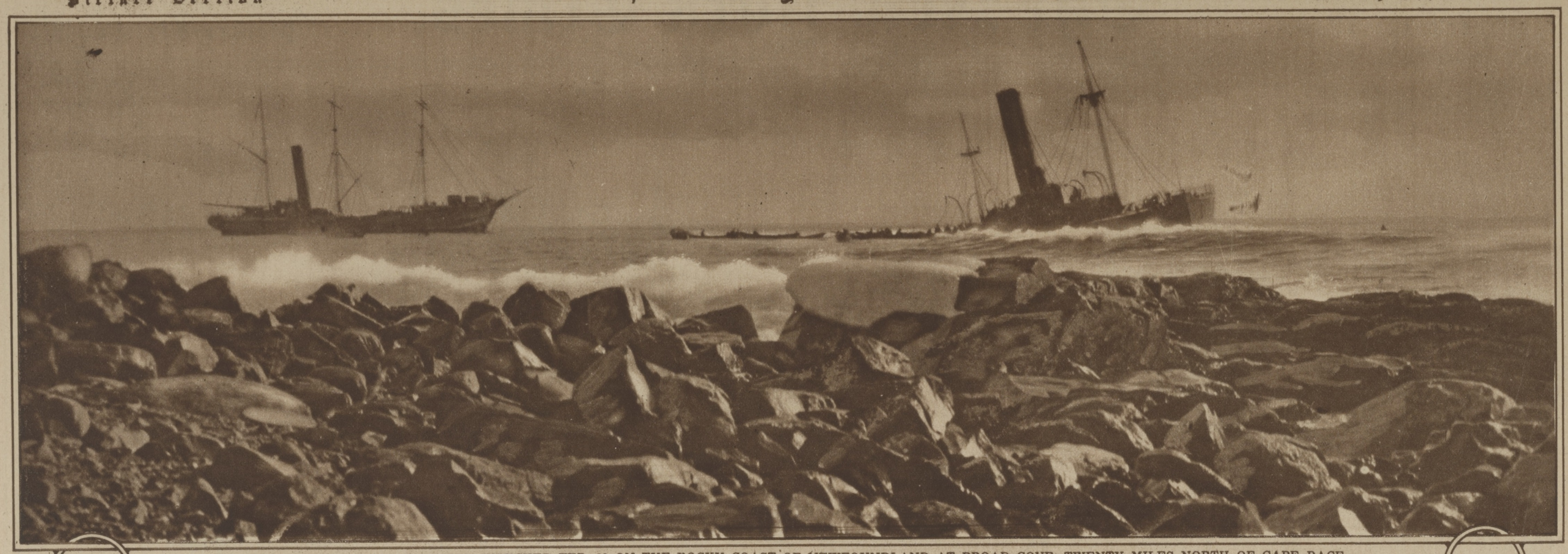
Red Cross Liner Florizel wrecked on the Rocky Coast of Newfoundland, 1918

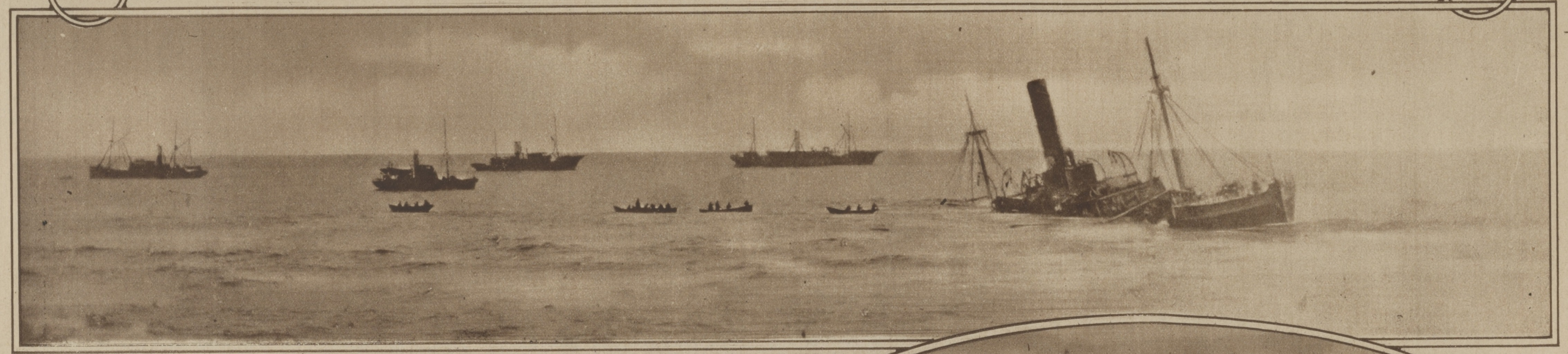
The rescue fleet assembled about sunken Florizel at 8:30 AM February 24, 1918

Florizel departed St. John's on Saturday, 23 February 1918, for Halifax and then on to New York, with 78 passengers and 60 crew. Among the passengers were many prominent St. John's businessmen. Shortly after the vessel passed through the St. John's Narrows at 8:30 pm the weather turned nasty. The vessel's log was not deployed due to the ice conditions. After sighting the Bay Bulls Lighthouse and losing sight of land at 10:20 pm, none of the three lighthouses south of Bay Bulls were sighted. Nevertheless, after eight hours of steaming southward, Captain Martin reckoned that he had rounded Cape Race, maintained his order for full speed, and ordered the final course change at 4:35 am to West by South. At this point, without the benefit of either the log or lighthouse sightings, the Captain had only soundings and engine RPM to verify DR position; however, neither were utilized. Florizel, had actually travelled just 45 miles and was well short of the Cape. The sea crashing against the rocks at Horn Head Point was white with froth and Captain Martin mistook it for ice and crashed full speed into the rocks at 4:50 am. Most of the passengers and crew that survived the initial crash found shelter in the Marconi Shack, the least damaged portion of the ship.

== Rescue ==
An SOS was sent out and received by the HM Wireless Station located at Mount Pearl. The Evening Telegram newspaper reported, "... first news of the disaster was picked up by the Admiralty wireless station at Mount Pearl in a radio from the stranded ship: 'SOS Florizel ashore near Cape Race fast going to pieces.'"

By the evening of 24 February, the first rescue ships had arrived to no sign of life. The weather had abated somewhat when light was spotted and a rescue attempt was carried out after the storm had calmed. Of the 138 passengers and crew, 44 had survived the initial crash and 27 hours after the ship had struck ground, the last of the passengers and crew were rescued. Medals of bravery were awarded to several crew members of HMS Briton and HMS Prospero who had responded to the wreck; these were given by the Prince of Wales, the future King Edward VIII, while he was in St. John's in 1919.

== Investigation ==
Captain Martin, who had survived the tragedy, was held responsible for the disaster, because of the lack of soundings taken during the course of the voyage. His certificate was suspended for twenty-one months. It was not until later that Captain Martin was found not to have been at fault. The Chief Engineer, J.V. Reader, had reduced the speed of the vessel as soon as she left port, bypassing the captain's orders to proceed at full speed. This action had caused the ship to make less distance than had been thought. The reason cited for Reader's action was to prolong the trip to Halifax such that the vessel would have to dock overnight and allow Reader time to visit his family while there.

== Passengers and crew ==
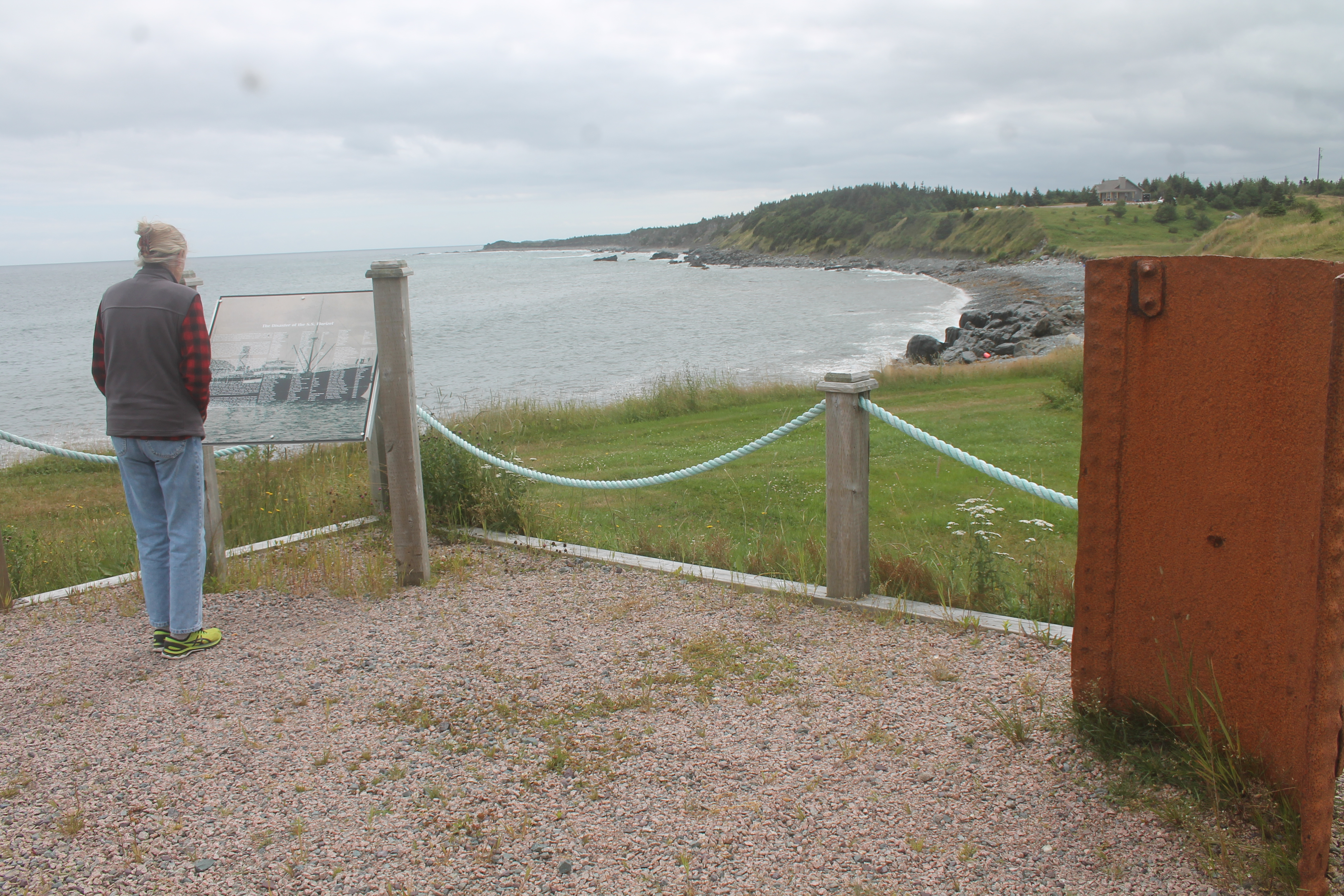
The remaining wreckage lies 100 yds off Horn Head, in the distance.

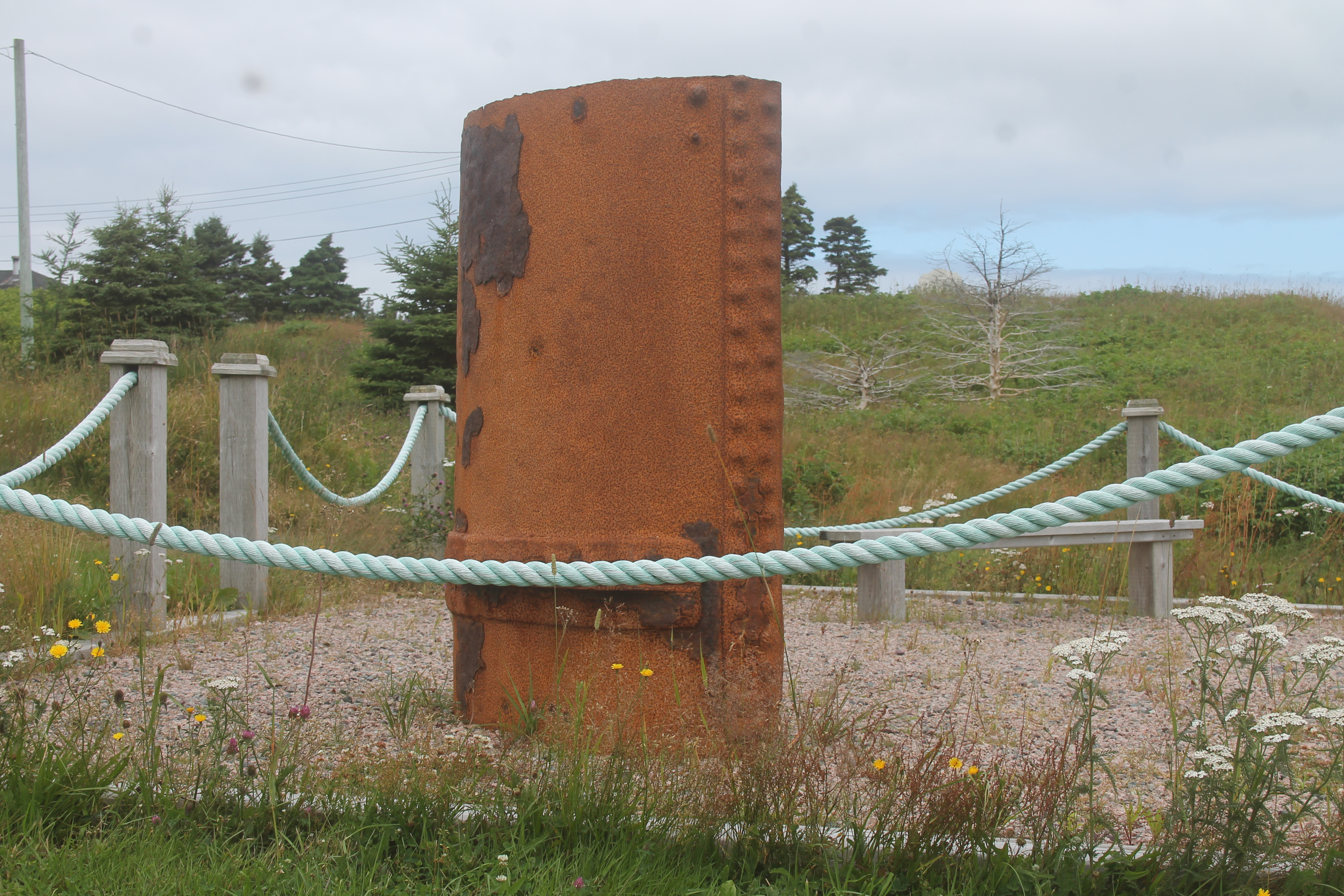
A surviving section of the smokestack.

Memorial at Cappahayden

=== Lost passengers of historical importance ===
- Patrick Laracy, owner of the Crescent theater in St. John's.
- John Shannon Munn, managing director of Bowring Brothers (and a step-son of Sir Edgar Rennie Bowring, a founder of the company), with his three-year-old daughter, Elizabeth Shannon "Betty" Munn.
- James H. Baggs, curling, Bay Of Island

=== Other lost passengers ===
First class

1. Frederick C. Smythe, 44
2. Wilbert C. Butler, 32
3. James H. Baggs, 40
4. William F. Butler, 50
5. Mrs. W. F. (Minnie) Butler, 40
6. Patrick Laracy, 50
7. Edgar Froude, 38
8. James J. McCoubrey, 40
9. Robert Wright, 45
10. James Miller, 30
11. James Daley, 40
12. Miss Annie Dalton, 33
13. Miss Mabel Barrett, 23
14. Thomas McMurdo McNeil, 45
15. Frank Chown, 19
16. Fred Snow, 22
17. Edwin V. Berteau, 18
18. John Carnell Parsons, 27
19. Newman Sellars, 20
20. George Massie, 41
21. Mrs. Massie, 38
22. Miss Katherine Massie, 8
23. William E. Bishop, 38
24. Charles H. Miller, 42
25. Captain O. P. Belleveau, 38
26. George A. Moulton, 33
27. Master Clarence E. Moulton, 9
28. F. Gerald P. St. John, 20
29. William J. Moore, 43
30. Michael Connolly, 74
31. John Connolly, 31
32. George Parmiter, 25
33. Captain Joseph Kean, 44
34. John Shannon Munn, 37
35. Miss Betty Munn, 3 1/2
36. William Earle, 42
37. Michael O’Driscoll, 37
38. Miss Blanche Beaumont, 11
39. Miss Constance Evelyn Trenchard, 29

Second class

1. Joseph Maloney, 29
2. Mrs. Mary Maloney, 28
3. Master John Maloney, 7 months
4. Patrick J. Fitzpatrick, 42
5. Andy Power, 24
6. John Costello, 49
7. William Guzzwell, 11
8. Miss Elizabeth Pelley, 29
9. Peter Guilfoyle, 27
10. Edward Greening, 36
11. George Long, 37
12. R.J. Fowlow, 23
13. Geo. Puddester, 42
14. John Lynch, 55
15. Walter J. Richards, 24
16. Leonard Nicholl, 31
17. James Crockwell, 50
18. Herbert Piercey, 22
19. James Bartlett, 25
20. Charles Howell, 24
21. John Forrest, 23
22. George E. Stevenson, 53

=== Officers and crew perished ===
1. John R. King, Second Officer, Arichat, N.S.
2. John V. Reader, Chief Engineer, Halifax, N.S., 45
3. Charles Snow, Second Steward, St. John's
4. Miss Margaret Keough, Stewardess, St. John's
5. Fred Guthrie, Second Cook, Liverpool
6. John L. Mckinnon, Baker, Glasgow
7. Ramon Rez, Messroom Steward, Spain
8. P. Lynch, Waiter, St. John's
9. Gordon Ivany, Waiter, St. John's
10. Austin Whitten, Waiter, St John's
11. Stanley Squires, Waiter, St. John's
12. Stanley Foley, Waiter, Grey Islands
13. M. L. Dunphy, Waiter, St. John's
14. Thomas Hennebury, Oiler, St. John's
15. Alfred Moody, Butcher, Hampshire
16. Geo Crocker, Sailor, St. John's
17. William Walters, Sailor, Trinity
18. Charles Bailey, Sailor, Port Rexton
19. John Power, Sailor, Paradise, P.B.

=== Passengers saved ===
1. Lieut. Alexander Ledingham, 30
2. Ralph Burnham, 23
3. Joseph Stockley, 22
4. Major Michael S. Sullivan, 42
5. John J. Cleary, 27
6. William Parmiter, 40
7. John P. Kiely, 32
8. William Dodd, 22
9. W. Noah Dauphinee, 36
10. Archibald E. Gardiner, 32
11. Albert G. Fagan, 29
12. Dave Griffiths, 24
13. Miss Kitty Cantwell, 21
14. Miss Minnie Denief, 21
15. Thomas Whelan, 27
16. G. M. Mullowney
17. John G. Sparrow, 27

=== Officers and crew saved ===
1. Captain William J. Martin, 43
2. Chief Officer William James, 35
3. 3rd Officer Philip Jackman, 31
4. 2nd Engineer Thomas Lumsden, 35
5. 3rd Engineer Eric Collier, 26
6. 4th Engineer Herbert Taylor, 22
7. Marconi Operator Cecil Sidney Carter
8. Asst. Marconi Operator Bernard John Murphy, 24
9. Bosun Michael F. Power
10. Carpenter Jacob Pinsent, 32
11. John Johnston, Pantry Waiter, 22
12. James Dwyer, Waiter, 22
13. Joseph Moore, Cook
14. Fred Roberts, Cook, 27
15. Edward Timmons, Oiler
16. John Davis, Oiler
17. A Hatchard, Sailor
18. Henry Dodd, Waiter, 21
19. Alex Fleet, Waiter
20. William Dooley, Sailor, 34
21. Joseph Burry, Sailor
22. Thomas Greene, Sailor
23. George Curtis, Gunner
24. Henry Snow, Waiter
25. Charles Reelis, Waiter
26. Jose Fernandez, Fireman
27. Wm. Molloy, Sailor.

28. John Lambert, 57

=== Survivors of historical importance ===
- J.P. Kiely, owner/manager of the Nickel Theatre in St. John's.

=== Bodies not recovered ===
- Francisco Fornas, fireman, Spain.
- Edward Greening, Bonavista.
- Charles Howell, Trinity.
- Gordon Ivany, St. John's.
- Clarence E. Moulton, St. John's.
- Leonard Nicholl, St. John's.

== Recipients of the Royal Humane Society Medal for Bravery at Sea ==
=== SS Gordon C ===
- Captain E. C. Perry
- Chief Engineer Robert Pierson
- Seaman Joseph Budden

=== SS Hawk ===
- Captain Martin Dalton, R.N.R.
- Seaman Daniel Ralph, R.N.R.
- Seaman Michael Whelan, R.N.R.

These men, along with H. Clouter, C. W. Penny, R.N.R., Adolphus "Dolf" Morey, R.N.R., G. Westcott, R. Pierson, and J. Budden, also received the Board of Trade Medal for Saving Life at Sea, (or Sea Gallantry Medal).
