= High Commissioner of Newfoundland to the United Kingdom =

Former Newfoundland diplomat

The High Commissioner of Newfoundland to the United Kingdom was the Dominion of Newfoundland's foremost diplomatic representative in the United Kingdom of Great Britain and Ireland (after 1922, the United Kingdom of Great Britain and Northern Ireland), and was in charge of Newfoundland's diplomatic mission in the United Kingdom.

== History ==
Though Newfoundland was granted dominion status in 1907, it was not until November 22, 1918, that its High Commission was established in London with the appointment of Sir Edgar Rennie Bowring who took the position at his own expense. The High Commission was abolished in 1934 when Newfoundland's dominion status was suspended, along with self-government, and direct rule by London was established with the commission of government.

Britain did not begin to send High Commissioners to Dominions until after the Balfour Declaration of 1926 in which it was agreed that Governors-General would no longer represent the British government. While Britain began appointing high commissioners to Canada in 1928, South Africa in 1930, Australia in 1936, and New Zealand in 1939, no High Commissioner was sent to Newfoundland due to the establishment of the Commission of Government in 1934, which made such an appointment redundant.

== List of High Commissioners ==
No.	Portrait	Name (Birth–Death)	Term of office		Refs.
1 (1)		Edgar Rennie Bowring (1858–1943)	November 22, 1918	1922	
2		Victor Gordon (1884–1928)	1924 (acting 1922–24)	October 6, 1928	
3 (acting)		W. Hutchings	1928	1930	
4 (acting)		Daniel James Davies (1880–1946)	1930	1932	
1 (2)		Edgar Rennie Bowring (1858–1943)	1933	February 16, 1934	
