= George Pitts (Middlesex cricketer) =

Canadian cricketer

Personal information
- Full name: George James Stuart Pitts
- Born: 6 October 1878; St. John's, Newfoundland, Canada
- Died: 27 July 1939 (aged 60); Margate, Kent, England
- Batting: Right-handed
- Bowling: Right-arm fast

Domestic team information
- Years: Team
- 1914: Middlesex

Career statistics
Competition	First-class
Matches	2
Runs scored	14
Batting average	14.00
100s/50s	–/–
Top score	14
Balls bowled	324
Wickets	6
Bowling average	27.50
5 wickets in innings	–
10 wickets in match	–
Best bowling	3/36
Catches/stumpings	–/–
- Source: CricketArchive, 14 October 2011

George James Stuart Pitts (6 October 1878 – 27 July 1939), was a first-class cricketer.

Pitts was born in St. John's, Newfoundland, then an English colony, now part of Canada. He played two matches for Middlesex in 1914. He batted once and scored 14 runs, and as a bowler he collected 6 wickets. He died in Margate, Kent, England.
