= Bowring Brothers =

Canadian retail chain (1811–2019)

Bowring Brothers Ltd.
- Type: Private
- Industry: Shipping; Retail
- Founded: 1811; 215 years ago (St. John's, Newfoundland)
- Founder: Benjamin Bowring
- Defunct: 2019; 7 years ago
- Headquarters: St. John's, Newfoundland and Labrador, Canada
- Key people: Charles T. Bowring; Charles R. Bowring (manager & senior partner, Newfoundland, 1869-1890); Edgar Rennie Bowring (president).
- Products: Historical: Shipowners, fish and general merchants, steamship agents Later: Gifts and home decor

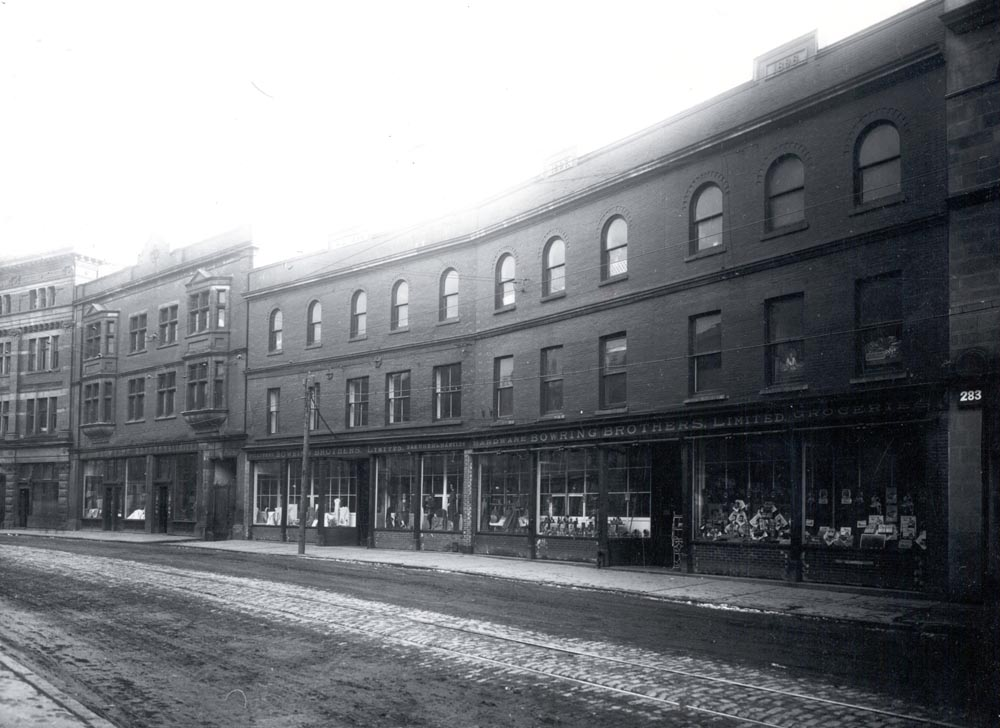
Bowring Brothers Shop, Water Street, St. John's, c. 1892

Bowring Brothers Ltd. (or simply Bowring) was a Newfoundland-based operator of retail stores, that, after Newfoundland became part of Canada, expanded its operation and narrowed its focus to gifts and home decor throughout Canada.

Bowring was engaged in Newfoundland's commerce for over 200 years, with various operations across the globe at its peak.

== History ==
Bowring was formed in 1811 as a private company by Benjamin Bowring and his family, who had just moved to St. John's, Newfoundland. Benjamin Bowring, an English clockmaker, set up shop in that business, while his wife Charlotte established a dry goods store which evolved into a large department store on Water Street.

House flag of Bowring Brothers

Bowring Brothers became shipowners, fish and general merchants, and steamship agents. In the late 19th century, the Bowring Brothers chartered the ship Nelly, captained by Robert Austin Sheppard (1865–1909), to carry fish to ports in Pernambuco, Brazil and Sydney, New South Wales. The Bowring Brothers ran the Red Cross Line of steamships around Newfoundland and Labrador. It owned SS Florizel, one of the first passenger ships in the world specifically designed to navigate icy waters. It also took part in the annual seal harvest off Newfoundland's northeast coast. Florizel was used as a troopship and in October 1914 carried the first 540 volunteers of the Newfoundland Regiment into World War I. Florizel ran aground and sank in 1918 with significant loss of life. The numerous vessels owned by the Bowring family between 1818 and 1937 were catalogued by Arthur Wardle.

After World War II, the company focused on its retail business, including the department store in St. John's and a chain of over 100 gift shops in shopping malls across Canada and the US. By the late 1980s, the Bowring family had sold the chain to American retailer Hallmark Cards, and in 1993 it was acquired by Royal Canadian Securities through subsidiary Tereve Holdings, following which the St. John's store closed, leaving Bowring without any retail presence in the province for over a decade.

Fred Benitah, owner and chief executive officer of the privately owned home-goods retailer Benix & Company, Inc. (based in Toronto, Ontario), purchased the insolvent Bowring Brothers chain in October 2005. Fred Benitah and his brother Isaac Benitah together privately controlled a number of retailers including Fairweather, International Clothiers and Benix & Co. Following this sale, Bowring began to shift its energy towards a series of home stores in power centres across Canada, at its peak numbering 34 — including one in St. John's — but continued to operate 31 mall stores in larger Canadian centres.

After U.S. retailer Bombay Company filed for Chapter 11 bankruptcy protection on September 20, 2007, Bombay's Canadian operations (after inventory disposition) were acquired by the Benitahs and combined operations with Bowring and Benix & Company.

=== Bankruptcy and liquidation ===
On November 6, 2018, Fluid Brands Inc (which supplies for Bowring and The Bombay Company) and is owned by retail mogul, Fred Benitah, claimed insolvency. They obtained protection from creditors under the Bankruptcy and Insolvency Act. According to documents, Fluid Brands Inc is $50 million in debt. As of November 2018, both Bowring and The Bombay Company have shut down all supplier websites and are in liquidation process. As of January 2019, all Bowring and Bombay stores are closed.

== See also ==
- Bowring Park (St. John's), a park built on land donated by the company
- Bowring Downtown Centre, an office complex redeveloped from the former Bowring department store in St. John's
