= Dominion of Newfoundland =

British dominion in North America from 1907 to 1949

- 1907–1949
- Co-flags Coat of arms
- Motto: Quaerite prime regnum Dei (Latin for 'Seek ye first the kingdom of God')
- Anthem: "Ode to Newfoundland" "God Save the King"
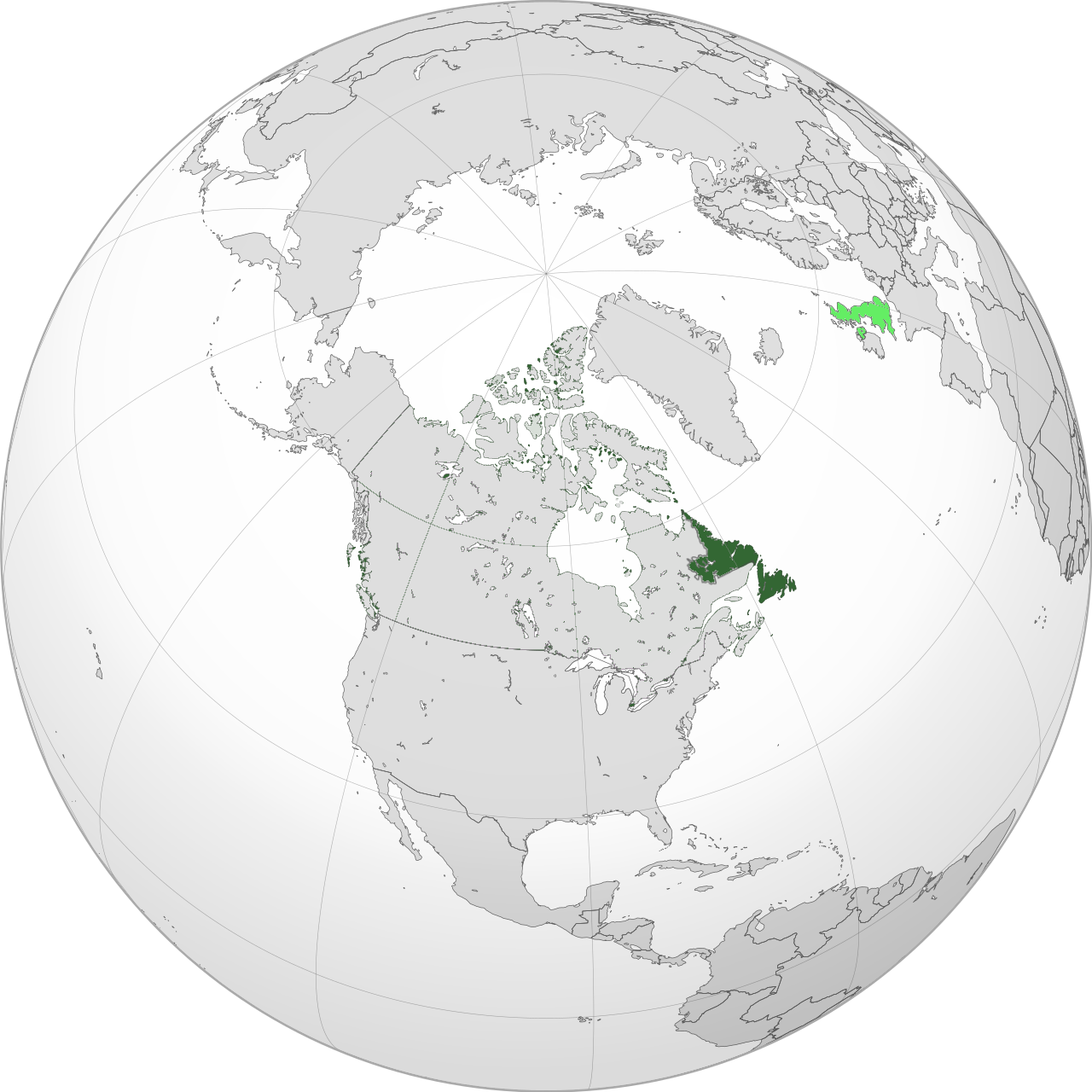
- Map of the Dominion of Newfoundland (in dark green) in relation to the United Kingdom (in light green)
- Status: British dominion
- Capital and largest city: St. John's
- Official languages: English
- Demonym: Newfoundlander
- Government: Responsible government (1907-1934); Commission of government (1934–1949)
- King
  - 1907–1910 (first): Edward VII
  - 1936–1949 (last): George VI
- Governor General
  - 1907–1909 (first): Sir William MacGregor
  - 1946–1949 (last) (See list): Sir Gordon Macdonald
- Prime Minister
  - 1907–1910 (first): Sir Robert Bond
  - 1932–1934 (last) (See list): Frederick C. Alderdice
- Legislature: General Assembly of Newfoundland
  - Upper house: Legislative Council of Newfoundland
  - Lower house: House of Assembly
- Historical era: Early to mid-20th century
  - Semi-sovereign dominion: 26 September 1907
  - Fully sovereign dominion: 15 November 1926
  - Commission of Government: 16 February 1934
  - Canadian province: 31 March 1949

Area
  - Total: 405,212 km^{2} (156,453 sq mi)
- Currency: Newfoundland dollar
Preceded by	Succeeded by
Newfoundland Colony	Canada; Province of Newfoundland
- Today part of: Canada; ∟Newfoundland and Labrador
- *National holidays celebrated on 24 June, Discovery Day, 1 July, Memorial Day; Patron saint John the Baptist.

The Dominion of Newfoundland, or simply Newfoundland, was a British Dominion in eastern North America, today the modern Canadian province of Newfoundland and Labrador. It included the island of Newfoundland, and Labrador on the continental mainland. Newfoundland was one of the original dominions under the Balfour Declaration of 1926, and accordingly enjoyed a constitutional status equivalent to the other dominions of the time. Its dominion status was confirmed by the Statute of Westminster 1931, although the statute was not otherwise applicable to Newfoundland.

In 1934, Newfoundland became the only dominion to give up its self-governing status, which ended 79 years of self-government. The abolition of self-government came about because of a crisis in Newfoundland's public finances in 1932. Newfoundland had accumulated a significant amount of debt by building a railway across the island, which was completed in the 1890s, and by raising its own regiment during the First World War. In November 1932, the government warned that Newfoundland would default on payments on the public debt. The British government quickly established the Newfoundland Royal Commission to inquire into and report on the position. The commission's report, published in October 1933, recommended that Newfoundland give up self-government temporarily and allow the United Kingdom to administer it by an appointed commission.

The Newfoundland parliament accepted the recommendations; it then presented a petition to the King to ask for the suspension of the constitution and the appointment of commissioners to administer the government until the country became self-supporting again. To enable compliance with the request, the British Parliament passed the Newfoundland Act, 1933, and on 16 February 1934, the British government appointed six commissioners, three from Newfoundland and three from the United Kingdom, with the governor as chairman. The system of a six-member Commission of Government continued to govern Newfoundland until Newfoundland joined Canada in 1949 to become Canada's tenth province.

== Name and national symbols ==
The official name of the dominion was "Newfoundland" and not, as was sometimes reported, "Dominion of Newfoundland". The distinction is apparent in many statutes, most notably the Statute of Westminster that listed the full name of each realm, including the "Dominion of New Zealand", the "Dominion of Canada", and "Newfoundland".

The Newfoundland Red Ensign, official land flag from 1907 to 1931. this flag continued to be used as a civil ensign after 1931 until 1949

The Union Flag, official flag of the Dominion of Newfoundland from 1931, and of the Canadian province of Newfoundland from 1949 to 1980

The Newfoundland Red Ensign was used as the de facto national flag of the dominion until the legislature adopted the Union Flag on 15 May 1931.

The anthem of the dominion was the "Ode to Newfoundland", written by British colonial governor Sir Cavendish Boyle in 1902 during his administration of Newfoundland (1901 to 1904). It was adopted as the dominion's anthem on 20 May 1904, until confederation with Canada in 1949. In 1980, the province of Newfoundland re-adopted the song as a provincial anthem. The "Ode to Newfoundland" continues to be heard at public events in the province; however, only the first and last verses are traditionally sung.

== Political origins ==
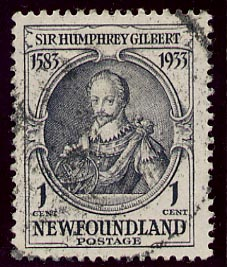
Newfoundland postage stamp, featuring Sir Humphrey Gilbert

Newfoundland was the oldest English colony in North America, being claimed by John Cabot for Henry VII, and again by Sir Humphrey Gilbert in 1583. It gradually acquired European settlement; in 1825, it was formally recognised as a Crown colony by the British government. The British government granted representative government in 1832, and responsible government in 1854. In 1855, Philip Francis Little, a native of Prince Edward Island, won a parliamentary majority over Sir Hugh Hoyles and the Conservatives. Little formed the first administration from 1855 to 1858.

Newfoundland sent two delegates to the Quebec Conference in 1864 which resulted in Canadian Confederation, but the option of joining was not popular in Newfoundland. In the 1869 general election, Newfoundlanders rejected confederation with Canada. Sir John Thompson, Prime Minister of Canada, floated the idea of negotiating Newfoundland's entry into Confederation in the 1892 Halifax Conference.

Newfoundland remained a colony until the 1907 Imperial Conference resolved to confer dominion status on all self-governing colonies in attendance. The annual holiday of Dominion Day was celebrated each 26 September to commemorate the occasion.

== First World War and afterwards ==
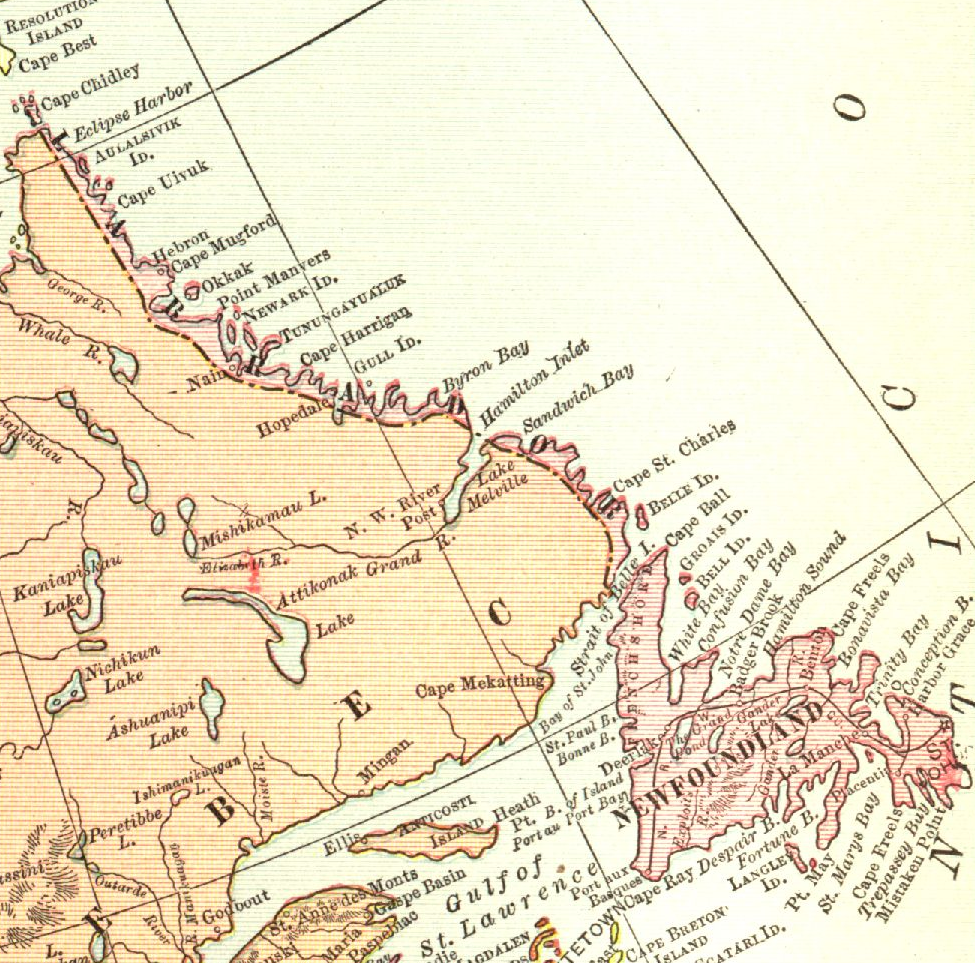
Map of Newfoundland in 1912.

Newfoundland's own regiment, the 1st Newfoundland Regiment, fought in the First World War. On 1 July 1916, the German Army wiped out most of that regiment at Beaumont Hamel on the first day on the Somme, inflicting 90 percent casualties. Yet the regiment went on to serve with distinction in several subsequent battles, earning the prefix "Royal". Despite people's pride in the accomplishments of the regiment, Newfoundland's war debt and pension responsibility for the regiment and the cost of maintaining a trans-island railway led to increased and ultimately unsustainable government debt in the post-war era.

After the war, Newfoundland along with the other dominions sent a separate delegation to the Paris Peace Conference but, unlike the other dominions, Newfoundland neither signed the Treaty of Versailles in her own right nor sought separate membership in the League of Nations.

In the 1920s, political scandals wracked the dominion. In 1923, the attorney general arrested Newfoundland's prime minister, Sir Richard Squires, on charges of corruption. Despite his release soon after on bail, a commission of enquiry, headed by Thomas Hollis-Walker, reviewed the scandal. Soon after, the Squires government fell. Squires returned to power in 1928 because of the unpopularity of his successors, the pro-business Walter Stanley Monroe and (briefly) Frederick C. Alderdice (Monroe's cousin), but found himself governing a country suffering from the Great Depression.

The Judicial Committee of the Privy Council resolved Newfoundland's long-standing Labrador boundary dispute with Canada to the satisfaction of Newfoundland and against Canada (and, in particular, contrary to the wishes of Quebec, the province that bordered Labrador) with a ruling on 1 April 1927. Prior to 1867, the Quebec North Shore portion of the "Labrador coast" had shuttled back and forth between the colonies of Lower Canada and Newfoundland. Maps up to 1927 showed the coastal region as part of Newfoundland, with an undefined boundary. The Privy Council ruling established a boundary along the drainage divide separating waters that flowed through the territory to the Labrador coast, although following two straight lines from the Romaine River along the 52nd parallel, then south near 57 degrees west longitude to the Gulf of Saint Lawrence. Quebec has long rejected the outcome, and Quebec's provincially issued maps do not mark the boundary in the same way as boundaries with Ontario and New Brunswick.

Newfoundland only gradually implemented its status as a self-governing dominion. In 1921, it officially established the position of High Commissioner to the United Kingdom (for which Sir Edgar Rennie Bowring had already assumed the role in 1918), and it adopted a national flag and established an external affairs department in 1931. Although the legislature of Newfoundland gave its assent to the passage of the Statute of Westminster, when the Statute was finalised the Newfoundland delegation requested that it not come into effect in Newfoundland until the legislature had consented to the application of the statute. The legislature of Newfoundland never gave its consent, so the statute was not in force in Newfoundland until it joined Canada.

== End of responsible government ==
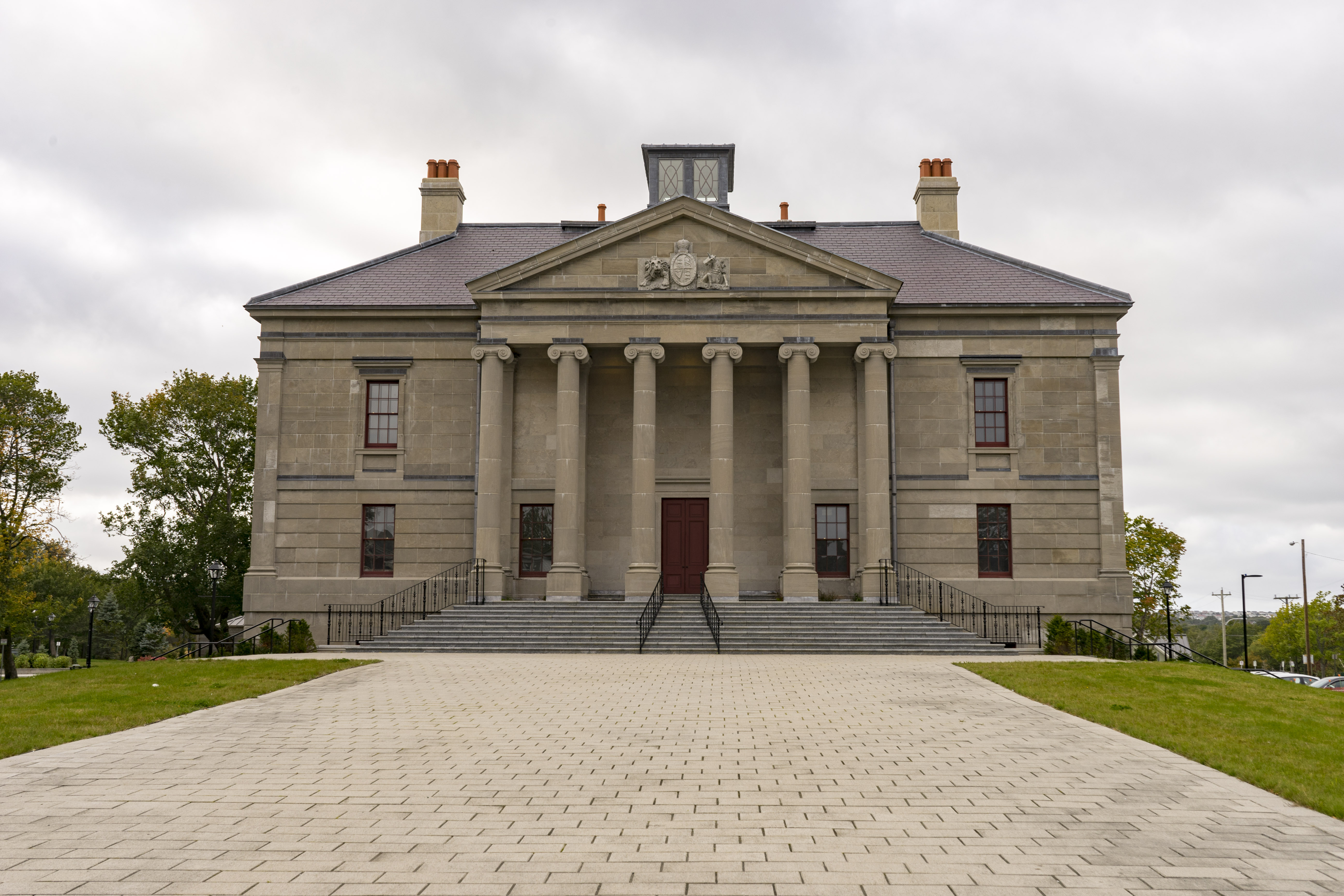
The Colonial Building, seat of the Newfoundland House of Assembly

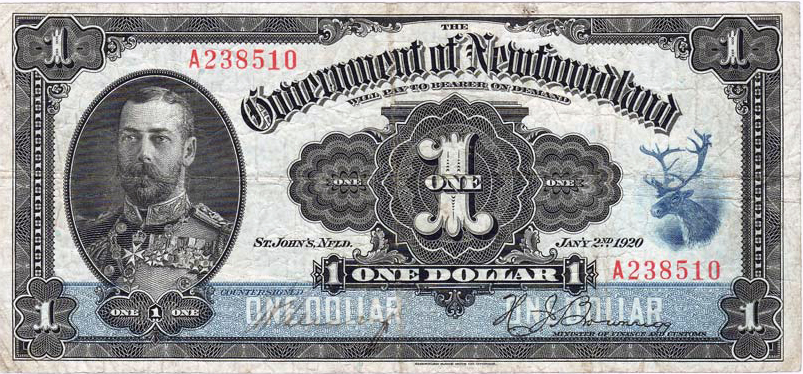
A Newfoundland dollar bill issued in 1920

As a small country which relied primarily upon the export of fish, paper, and minerals, Newfoundland was hit hard by the Great Depression. Economic frustration combined with anger over government corruption led to a general dissatisfaction with democratic government. On 5 April 1932, a crowd of 10,000 people marched on the Colonial Building (seat of the House of Assembly) and forced Prime Minister Squires to flee. Squires lost an election held later in 1932. The next government, led once more by Alderdice, called upon the British government to take direct control until Newfoundland could become self-sustaining. The United Kingdom, concerned over Newfoundland's likelihood of defaulting on its war-debt payments, established the Newfoundland Royal Commission, headed by a Scottish peer, Lord Amulree. Its report, released in 1933, assessed Newfoundland's political culture as intrinsically corrupt and its economic prospects as bleak, and advocated the abolition of responsible government and its replacement by a Commission of the British Government. Acting on the report's recommendations, Alderdice's government voted itself out of existence in December 1933.

In 1934, the British Parliament passed the Newfoundland Act, 1933 which suspended Newfoundland's legislature and established the Commission of Government. Letters patent passed under the act provided that Newfoundland was ruled by the governor, who reported to the Colonial Secretary in London, and the commission, appointed by the British government. Newfoundland remained a dominion in name only. The Newfoundland Supreme Court later held that the surrender of responsible government and the establishment of the commission of government "... reduces the Island to the status of a pure Crown colony".

== Second World War ==
The severe worldwide Great Depression persisted until the Second World War broke out in 1939.

Given Newfoundland's strategic location in the Battle of the Atlantic, the Allies (especially the United States of America) built many military bases there. Large numbers of men gained the first paycheques they had seen in years by working on construction and in dockside crews. National income doubled as an economic boom took place in the Avalon Peninsula and to a lesser degree in Gander, Botwood, and Stephenville. The United States became the main supplier, and American money and influence diffused rapidly from the military, naval, and air bases. Prosperity returned to the fishing industry by 1943. Government revenues, aided by inflation and new income, quadrupled, even though Newfoundland had tax rates much lower than those in Canada, Britain, or the United States. To the astonishment of all, Newfoundland started financing loans to London. Wartime prosperity ended the long depression and reopened the question of political status.

The American Bases Act became law in Newfoundland on 11 June 1941, with American personnel creating drastic social change on the island. This included significant intermarriage between Newfoundland women and American personnel.

In October 1943, the weather station Kurt was erected in Labrador, marking Nazi Germany's only armed operation on land in North America.

A new political party formed in Newfoundland to support closer ties with the US, the Economic Union Party, which Karl McNeil Earle characterizes as "a short-lived but lively movement for economic union with the United States". Advocates of union with Canada denounced the Economic Union Party as republican, disloyal and anti-British.

== National Convention and referendums ==
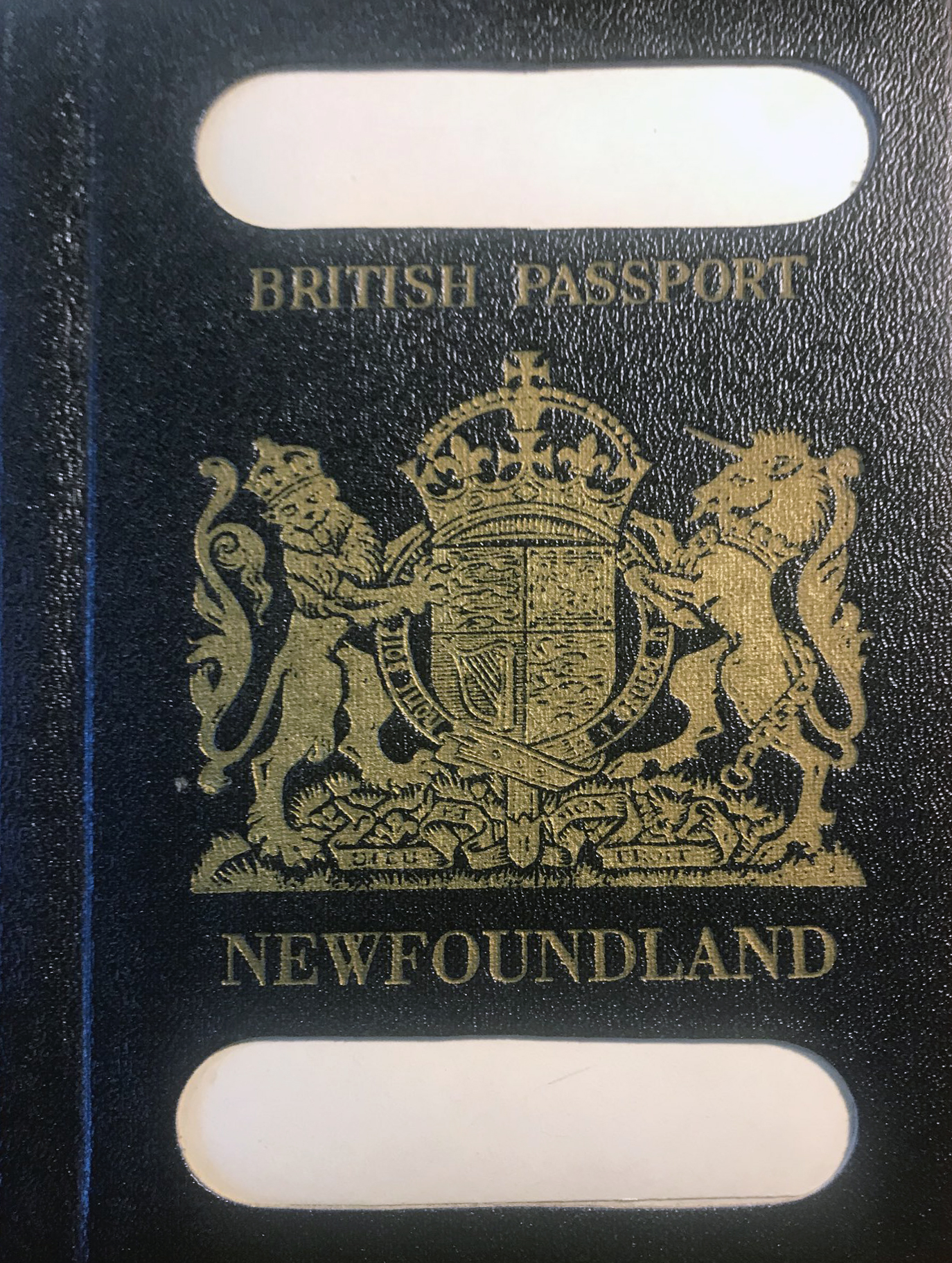
1930s passport

In 1945, London announced that a Newfoundland National Convention would be elected to advise on what constitutional choices should be voted on by referendum. Union with the United States was a possibility, but Britain rejected the option and offered instead two options: return to dominion status or continuation of the unpopular Commission. Canada cooperated with Britain to ensure that the option of closer ties with America was not on the referendum.

In 1946, an election took place to determine the membership of the Newfoundland National Convention, charged with deciding the future of Newfoundland. The Convention voted to hold a referendum to decide between continuing the Commission of Government or restoring responsible government. Joey Smallwood was a well-known radio personality, writer, organizer, and nationalist who had long criticized British rule. He became the leader of the confederates and moved for the inclusion of a third option – that of confederation with Canada. The Convention defeated his motion, but he did not give up, instead gathering more than 5,000 petition signatures within a fortnight, which he sent to London through the governor. Britain insisted that it would not give Newfoundland any further financial assistance, but added this third option of having Newfoundland join Canada to the ballot. After much debate, the first referendum took place on 3 June 1948, to decide between continuing with the Commission of Government, reverting to dominion status, or joining Canadian Confederation.

Three parties participated in the referendum campaign: Smallwood's Confederate Association campaigned for the confederation option while in the anti-confederation campaign Peter Cashin's Responsible Government League and Chesley Crosbie's Economic Union Party (both of which called for a vote for responsible government) took part. No party advocated petitioning Britain to continue the Commission of Government. Canada had issued an invitation to join it on generous financial terms. Smallwood was the leading proponent of confederation with Canada, insisting, "Today we are more disposed to feel that our very manhood, our very creation by God, entitles us to standards of life no lower than our brothers on the mainland." Due to persistence, he succeeded in having the Canada option on the referendum. His main opponents were Cashin and Crosbie. Cashin, a former finance minister, led the Responsible Government League, warning against cheap Canadian imports and the high Canadian income tax. Crosbie, a leader of the fishing industry, led the Party for Economic Union with the United States, seeking responsible government first, to be followed by closer ties with the United States, which could be a major source of capital.

The result proved inconclusive, with 44.5 percent supporting the restoration of dominion status, 41.1 percent for confederation with Canada, and 14.3 percent for continuing the Commission of Government. Due to no option getting at least 50 percent of the vote, a second referendum with the top two options from the first referendum was scheduled to be held on 22 July. The second referendum, on 22 July 1948, asked Newfoundlanders to choose between confederation and dominion status, and produced a vote of 52 to 48 percent for confederation. Newfoundland joined Canada in the final hours of 31 March 1949.

== See also ==
- Charles Jost Burchell, Canada's High Commissioner to Newfoundland, involved in negotiating union with Canada
- General elections in Newfoundland (pre-Confederation)
- High Commissioner of Newfoundland to the United Kingdom
- List of Newfoundland cases of the Judicial Committee of the Privy Council (pre-1949)
- List of political parties in Newfoundland and Labrador
- List of prime ministers of the Dominion of Newfoundland

=== Political parties in the Dominion of Newfoundland ===
- Conservative parties in Newfoundland (pre-Confederation)
- Fisherman's Protective Union
- Liberal parties in Newfoundland (pre-Confederation)
- Newfoundland People's Party
- United Newfoundland Party

== Sources ==
- Earle, Karl McNeil (Winter 1998). "Cousins of a Kind: The Newfoundland and Labrador Relationship with the United States". American Review of Canadian Studies. 28 (4): 387–411. doi:10.1080/02722019809481611. ISSN 1943-9954.
- Gwyn, Richard (1972). Smallwood: The Unlikely Revolutionary.
- Hiller, James K. (1998). Confederation: Deciding Newfoundland's Future, 1934–1949.
- Hiller, James K.; Harrington, Michael F., eds. (1995). The Newfoundland National Convention, 1946–1948. Montreal: McGill-Queen's University Press.
- Long, Gene (1999). Suspended State: Newfoundland Before Canada.
- MacKay, R. A., ed. (1946). Newfoundland: Economic, Diplomatic, and Strategic Studies. Toronto: Oxford University Press. doi:10.2307/137461.
- Neary, Peter (1988). Newfoundland in the North Atlantic World, 1929–1949. Kingston, Ontario: McGill-Queen's University Press. ISBN 978-0-7735-6180-9.
- Nicholson, G. W. L. (2010). The Fighting Newfoundlander: A History of the Royal Newfoundland Regiment. Montreal: McGill-Queen's University Press. ISBN 978-0-7735-7544-8.
- Overton, James (Autumn 1984). "Coming Home: Nostalgia and Tourism in Newfoundland". Acadiensis. 14 (1): 84–97. ISSN 1712-7432. JSTOR 30303385.
- Parsons, W David (2003). "Newfoundland and the Great War". Canada and the Great War: Western Front Association Papers. By Western Front Association. Busch, Briton C (ed.). Montreal: McGill–Queen's University Press. ISBN 0-7735-2570-X.
- Roberts-Wray, Kenneth (1966). Commonwealth and Colonial Law.
- Smallwood, Joey (1973). I Chose Canada: The Memoirs of the Honourable Joseph R. "Joey" Smallwood.
