= Benjamin Bowring =

English businessman

Benjamin Bowring (baptised 17 May 1778 – 1 June 1846) was an English watchmaker, jeweller, and businessman. He was the founder, in 1811, of the Bowring trading, shipping and insurance businesses, later known as Bowring Brothers in Canada and the United States, and C.T. Bowring & Co. in the United Kingdom and elsewhere. In 1979, the MV Benjamin Bowring was named after him. C.T. Bowring and Co. was bought by Marsh & McLennan Companies in 1980.
