= Beate Hahn =

German-American horticulturist from Berlin-Zehlendorf

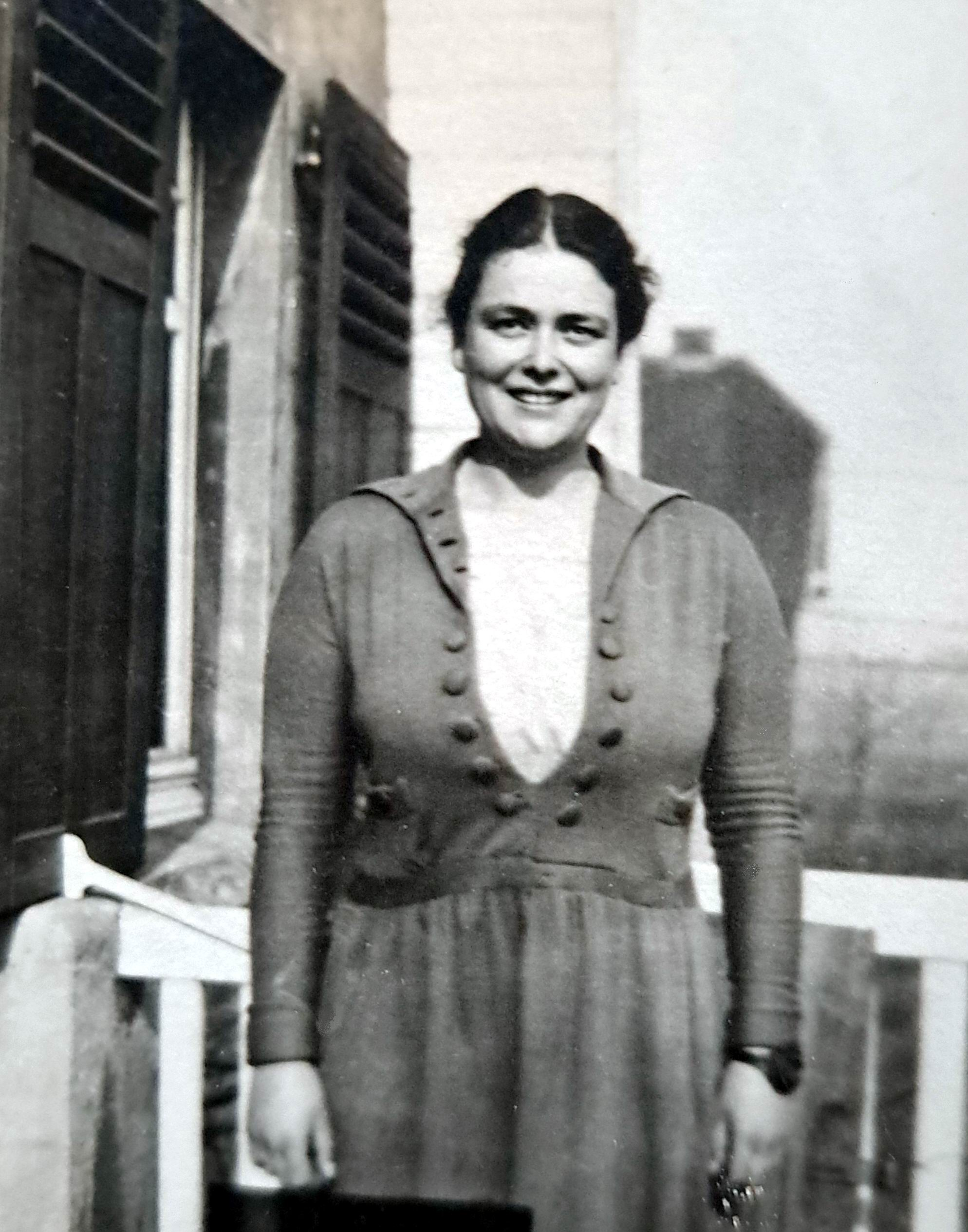
Beate Hahn in the 1920s

Beate Hahn (also known as Charlotte Beate Hahn or Lotte Beate Hahn) was a German-American horticulturist. She was born Sophie Charlotte Beate Jastrow on April 21, 1894, in Berlin-Zehlendorf and died on June 3, 1970, in Ossining, north of Tarrytown, in Westchester County, New York.

== Childhood and youth in Berlin ==
Beate was the daughter of the historian and social politician Ignaz Jastrow, professor at the University of Berlin, and teacher Anna Seligmann Jastrow (1858–1943) who was "vitally interested in community work". Together with her older sister, the classical archaeologist, Elisabeth Jastrow, Beate grew up in Wilhelmine Berlin. As the daughters of an educated middle-class family of assimilated Jews, both sisters received a good education.

According to Beate's own words, she was fascinated when she discovered yellow and purple crocuses in her parents' garden one day. The longing for a garden, which she had last seen at the age of five, later became the driving force behind her efforts to convey this experience in a garden to as many children as possible. She wrote: "At the age of eight, I had made up my mind to become a gardener. I never changed my mind — I never repented my decision. All my life I enjoyed fully my early choice which made it possible to build up gardens for better living!" Her parents leased their own plot for Beate on Spandauer Berg, where she could garden. At the age of twelve, she met the renown horticulturist, Karl Foerster for the first time when she purchased lily of the valley from him. This contact developed into a lifelong friendship.

Beate received lessons in Latin, French and English from private teachers. At the age of 15, she built a garden together with children who lived in a home for juveniles. After graduating from high school, she attended Horticulture College in Marienfelde, Berlin, from 1913 until her graduation with the highest grades in 1915. She then took a job at the Friedenthal Manor near Hildburghausen in Thuringia. During this time, she began to write articles about horticulture and wrote her first book Hurra, wir säen und ernten! However, it was not published until 1935. In 1917, she took over the role of estate gardener in Hirschfelde, (Note: Hirschfelde, since 2007 part of the city of Zittau in Southeast Saxony.) which included a lush park and garden. After this temporary position, Beate returned to her parents' home and looked after some private gardens. When Beate was 22, she repeatedly rejected the offer of the owner of the house Bergstraße 2 in Berlin-Wannsee to work for her as head gardener. Finally, the lady suggested that she would take lessons from Beate herself. But Beate replied that she had no intention of teaching ladies of Berlin society. When asked why she did not want to join her, the gardener said: "Because I don't like your business." When the lady asked further, "And what does a business that you like look like, Beate?", she answered: "It must show a happy harmony between fruit, vegetables and life in the garden." – "Then I will just rearrange my garden according to your wishes", the lady replied and did so, perhaps also a little for the sake of her future daughter-in-law. (Note: This lady was Charlotte Hahn, née Landau; Reproduction of the conversation after Monique Humbert: Beate Hahn – Ein Leben für Gärten) The happy harmony between fruit, vegetables and life in the garden mentioned by the young gardener could be a hidden indication of an early interest in Rudolf Steiner's anthroposophy.

== Marriage and her own family ==
Beate Jastrow married engineer Franz Hahn (1891–1933) on September 11, 1920, on Berlin's Pfaueninsel. (Note: Franz was the second son of Oskar Hahn (1860–1907) and Charlotte Hahn née Landau (1865–1934).) The young couple studied economics for a year at the Technische Hochschule Aachen, Germany. Franz then worked in the Ruhr mills (Oberhausen, Mülheim and Großenbaum) of the family's ironworks company (Hahnsche Werke AG). Franz and Beate Hahn had three daughters:

- Anna Elisabeth Cornelia Miriam Hahn (1921 Mülheim/Ruhr – 2021 Vancouver, Canada)
- Marianne Dorothea Bettina Hahn (1923 Düsseldorf – 1939 Altefeld, Werra-Meißner-Kreis)
- Charlotte Anna Eveline Hahn (1926 Düsseldorf – 2011 Ossining, Westchester County, N.Y.)

== Life in Angermund ==
From the end of 1922 to the end of 1927, Franz and Beate Hahn lived in Angermund. During this time, Beate gave birth to daughters Marianne (born 1923) and Charlotte (born 1926) in Düsseldorf clinics. Marianne was mentally and physically disabled due to a birth defect. Angelika Schweizer (1900–1976) joined the family as a nanny for the three daughters and this was the start of a lifelong friendship between the Schweizer and Hahn families. At the address Angermund 105 1/4, the Hahn family lived in a country house with six rooms, three attics and hot-water central heating. This included a garden of almost 3,000 m² and an orchard of about 10,000 m², which Beate Hahn cultivated herself. In 2008, her daughter, Cornelia, recalled the move to Angermund: "We moved near Düsseldorf to a village, and we had a beautiful garden. The lawn was [full of] daisies. [As a small child] I kept picking the daisies and amusing myself in the garden. This is my first experience of remembering very clearly what I did in the garden." The Hahns had come to Angermund because Franz worked at the Hahnsche Werke in nearby Großenbaum. In 1923, Beate created a youth garden for the workers' children, where they received practical and theoretical gardening lessons four times a week. In addition, a nursery building with an information room and a horticultural library was built. The nursery grew vegetables for the plant's canteen and hotel. A head gardener and his team looked after the gardens of the company directors, senior staff and workers. "Of all the gardens in which I worked, none was as close to my heart as the youth garden and the other facilities in Großenbaum. Chimneys were the background of this garden, soot and dirt were all around in the streets. Children who worked with delight in the garden, that was the youth garden." Beate Hahn described the situation in Angermund during the occupation of the Ruhr by Franco-Belgian troops (1923–1925) in an essay entitled Dem Gefährten – Dezember 1930 (translated as "The Companion – December 1930"). This abstract-expressionist text of 16 handwritten pages remained unfinished, but it is the only known description of the events in Angermund during the occupation. Therefore, it is of outstanding importance for local history. At the same time, Hahn's inclination towards her own creative writing style is also recognizable in this text.

== Return to Berlin ==
At the end of 1927, Franz and Beate Hahn moved back to Berlin. They lived in a large villa at Bernhard-Beyer-Straße 3 in Steinstücken, a location that belonged to the municipality of Neubabelsberg. (Note: Neubabelsberg was a villa colony established during the German Empire on the territory of the municipality of Klein Glienicke in the district of Teltow, which was renamed Neubabelsberg in 1925 and incorporated into Potsdam in 1939. For this reason, the files on the property of the Hahn family from the Third Reich are also in the holdings of the Brandenburg State Archive in Potsdam. Today, Steinstücken belongs to the district of Berlin-Wannsee in the district of Steglitz-Zehlendorf and is almost completely enclosed in the territory of Potsdam.) Angelika Schweizer continued to care for Cornelia, Marianne and Charlotte. In 1928, when she required more care, the Hahns placed their daughter Marianne in an institution for the disabled. A heartbreaking decision for the parents and their daughters. Almost seventy years later, Charlotte recounted in the Shoah Foundation interview with a laboriously controlled voice: "Although I was only two years old, I knew that Marianne was sick, but she was my sister! --- I never saw her again."

In Berlin, Beate Hahn continued her writing and gardening with children. She published books and developed games with which inspired children and adults to learn about horticulture. In 1928, her husband went to the USA for a year, where he studied with industrial engineer and psychologist Lillian Moller Gilbreth the analysis and optimization of work processes. After his return, he worked very successfully as a consulting engineer with his own office in Berlin for companies in Germany and abroad. From a trip to Romania in the early 1930s, he brought back a hand-embroidered traditional blouse for each of his daughters. Perhaps this is an indication that the parents visited Marianne more or less regularly, but only Cornelia and Charlotte were portrayed in these blouses in the summer of 1932. Sabine Lepsius painted them in these traditional blouses against the background of the cactus window in the conservatory. The painting and the three original blouses are in the Jewish Museum Berlin since 1997 and 2020 respectively. After Franz Hahn died in a skiing accident in the Swiss Alps in January 1933, Beate and her daughters inherited his fortune so that they could continue to live in the style they had become accustomed to in a villa with a cook, servants, car and driver. In 1935/36, the Nazis banned Beate Hahn from further publications because of her Jewish origins. Initially, she believed that as a baptized Jew and widow of a front-line fighter from the First World War, she did not have to fear more serious reprisals.

== Escape from National Socialism ==
Franz and Beate had decided in 1932 to emigrate to the USA for Franz's professional work and because of the rise of National Socialism. Franz Hahn's death before the seizure of power initially stalled the idea, while the brothers of her late husband, Kurt and Rudolf Hahn emigrated to England in 1933 and 1938 respectively. For the time being, Beate Hahn tried to live as normally as possible with her daughters Cornelia and Charlotte in the villa in Steinstücken where she continued to write books on garden education. In 1938 she decided to leave Germany and managed to call on Himmler after Kristallnacht. When she was asked why she wanted to emigrate, she replied that her daughters should learn many foreign languages. She was then told that she and her daughters would be provided with passports if 240,000 Reichsmarks were received by 3 o'clock in the afternoon. Beate Hahn paid the money from her already blocked bank account and received passports issued on November 18, 1938. Her brother-in-law, Kurt Hahn a renowned educator and founder of Schule Schloss Salem in Germany, Gordonstoun in Scotland as well as Outward Bound and the Duke of Edinburgh's Award then asked his friend Sir Alexander Waldemar Lawrence, who was at a congress in Leipzig, to help Beate Hahn and her daughters escape. Cornelia and Charlotte described the journey. Cornelia wrote: "We met Sir Alexander on November 23, 1938 at the Adlon Hotel in Berlin and went directly to the Zoo station to take the train to Ostend. When we stood at the border, an SS man shouted, 'Mrs. Hahn, get off!' Sir Alexander rose from his seat and asked the SS man: 'Why should the lady get off?' At the same time, the train started up again, and the SS man jumped out of the window. We breathed a sigh of relief. Uncle Kurt had saved us from sinking with the help of Sir Alexander."

The younger daughter Charlotte, who was only 12 years old at the time of escape, described crossing the border in more detail: "At the Bentheim border station, an SS man shouted 'Hahns get off'. My mother was arrested, Cornelia and I stood on the platform while Sir Alexander negotiated with the SS men in a small office. When he finally came out, we were allowed to get back on the train. Since the train had already started, I had to be the last to jump on the moving train. But I made it! [...] Four days after we arrived in London, I asked my mother: 'When is Marianne coming?' – My mother answered: 'She's not coming.' I really wanted to go back to Germany to get Marianne, but my mother and Cornelia prevented me from doing so..." Since Beate Hahn and her daughters were considered Reich Refugees after emigration, their assets were confiscated. In February 1939, Beate, Cornelia and Charlotte Hahn arrived in the USA; they had been able to travel from Cherbourg to New York on the Queen Mary. Daughter Marianne, who was accommodated in the Anthroposophical Institute Lauenstein in Altefeld in northern Hesse because of her disability, died there on March 3, 1939 of pneumonia.

== Life in the USA ==
After arriving in New York, Beate, Cornelia and Charlotte first lived in Westchester County, NY, and subsequently, in 1940, Beate Hahn acquired 200 acres of farmland near Wolfeboro, New Hampshire, which had once belonged to the farm of Governor John Wentworth (1737–1820). Beate went to work immediately to create a working farm and years later she recalled that, "at Heathview during the war corn was raised for a canning factory." With her horticultural expertise in the art and science of cultivating plants, she specialized in biodynamic vegetable cultivation, based on the ideas of Rudolf Steiner. and raised 38 varieties of vegetables for a public market until 1947. Later on she experimented with hydroponic plants, hybridized sunflowers, frost protection for plants and how to grow a large number of vegetables in small spaces, as well as in containers. She organized summer camps for children, wrote articles and volunteered. She became a US Citizen in 1944. After her daughters left home, Beate Hahn spent the summers at her house and garden in New Hampshire and during the winter months from 1951 to 1960 she lived mainly in Baden-Baden, Germany. She undertook numerous lecture tours to England, Scotland, France, Holland, Italy, Greece and Israel from there. Beate returned at least twice to Dusseldorf in 1955 and 1958. In a postcard sent to her daughter, Cornelia, and son-in-law, Peter Oberlander, in November 1958, Beate Hahn wrote, “Dusseldorf is “beautifully rebuilt with a conscience for the past, a new style comes to life”. (note 22). It is not known if Beate Hahn returned to Angermund. She engaged with her community through local garden clubs and served as the President of the Wolfeboro Garden Club (1964–67) and as Chair of World Gardening with the Federation of New Hampshire Garden Clubs (1965–69). Beate Hahn died of cancer on June 3, 1970. (Note: Some sources give the date of death as June 9, 1970. According to Document No. 49606/1970 of the New York State Death Index, "Charlott B. Hahn, age 76, residing in Ossining, Westchester County, NY" died on June 3, 1970 in Ossining, a small town just north of Tarrytown, where Beate's daughter Charlotte lived. The obituary, which Charlotte also sent to the Karl Foerster couple in Bornim (then East Germany), says "Died June 3, 1970 North Tarrytown." The original is in the archives of the Karl Foerster Foundation.)

== Garden Educator ==
Gardening with children promotes the development of various skills and strengthens their connection to nature. Children learn about biological processes through gardening. They acquire important social skills and learn how to interact with the environment. Beate Hahn was one of the first to recognize the importance of gardens for children's education in the 20th century. Early on, she was inspired by Friedrich Fröbel and his pedagogical concepts of early childhood education, especially by his idea of a kindergarten. As a young woman, she created the youth garden for the families of employees at the Hahnsche Werke in Großenbaum, near Dusseldorf. She also served as a horticultural advisor to a kindergarten. Even before emigrating, Beate Hahn wrote books on garden education published in Germany and Switzerland as well as designed educational games produced by Otto Maier in Ravensburg, Germany. Although she was not an artist, the many ideas for the design of her books and games came from Beate Hahn herself. She had a fruitful collaboration with two talented Berlin artists, sisters Esther and Ursel (Ursula) Bartning. Together these three women collaborated on three gardening books as well as on Garten-Quartett, a card game published by Otto Maier Verlag in Ravensburg. The publication of these books illustrates the challenges Jewish authors experienced in the 1930s. Hurra, wir säen und ernten! with illustrations by Ursel Bartning was published in Breslau, Germany by Korn in 1935 and a second edition was published by Max Rascher in Zurich in 1939. When Beate Hahn's manuscript for the 2nd book was ready for publication by Otto Maier Verlag; the Reich Chamber of Literature (a department of Reich Chamber of Culture) did not permit its publication. Since Jews were not admitted to the Chamber and therefore did not receive a publishing permission the book could not be published in Germany. However, Otto Maier was permitted to give the book to a Swiss publisher. As a result Die Gartenfibel für Kinder und Mütter and Der Kindergarten - ein Garten der Kinder, illustrated by Ursel and Esther Bartning, were published in Zurich by Max Rascher in 1935 and 1936 respectively. (Note: As Max Rascher's publishing company was based in Zurich and had a branch in Germany, the books could still be sold in Germany.)

After Beate Hahn's emigration to the US in 1939, her dedication to education continued. She taught gardening at a 4-H camp for young people in the 1940s on her farm in New Hampshire. After the war, she ran a training program in German, English and French for house parents, teachers and children at the International Pestalozzi Children's Village at Trogen Switzerland. Established in 1945, the Pestalozzi Children's Village served children from war-affected countries based on a cooperative approach to building world citizens. There Beate Hahn combined her expertise in horticulture, education and community building. She was able to resume her successful writing career which began during the pre-war period. New publications and updated editions of her books on gardening for young audiences continued to be published by publisher Max Rascher in Zurich.

== Collegial Collaboration with artists Ursula (Ursel) and Esther Bartning ==
Through her friendship with Karl Foerster, Beate met the Bartning sisters, Ursel (1905–1990) und Esther (1906–1987). (Note: Years of birth and death according to the Barting Homepage, Clemens A. Wimmer mentions 1984 as the year of Esther Bartning's decease. See: Die Blumenmalerinnen Ursula und Esther Bartning, Zandera, 35 (2020), No. 2, pp. 78-79.) These talented artists had learned painting from their parents, Ludwig und Gertrud Bartning, and then studied fine arts. Ursel's art focussed on figurative illustrations and paintings whereas Esther's art focussed on botanical themes. In 1927, their father introduced the sisters to Karl Foerster for whom they subsequently illustrated his perennial plant catalogues. From 1934-35 Ursel and Esther both collaborated with Beate Hahn on the illustrations and designs for her books and games. The three women worked together and also shared their friendship with Karl Foerster. They had a joint interest in Rudolf Steiner's anthroposophy to which they devoted themselves in various ways during their lifetimes. Ursel moved to England in 1936 where she became a teacher for mentally handicapped children in the anthroposophical colony of "Sunfield" near Birmingham and died in 1990. Esther continued to work on her botanical illustrations including her renown 1935-37 watercolours for the book, "Der Blaue Schatz der Gärten" by Karl Foerster published in 1940. She was well known for paintings of plants and flowers.

== Worldview ==
Beate Hahn's parents were assimilated Jews who belonged to Berlin's upper society. In her parents' home, Beate met professors, scientists and artists as a child. Her parents attached great importance to a good education for their daughters, Elisabeth and Beate. They were also given the opportunity to use their talents and realize their dreams in their respective fields and to mentor others. Her parents' educational ideals were formative for both Beate's personal philosophy and her professional work especially prior to the rise of antisemitism and discrimination in the 1930s. Marrying into the Hahn family gave her financial security. Beate was guided by her personal philosophy and her desire to share her experience and knowledge with the next generations. In the late 1960s, she created a "catalogue of her career" in which she wrote in English. "Today I consider gardening one of the few creative and constructive activities which we have to offer to the younger generation. It is a healthy and peaceful activity. Beyond that it is a highly artistic occupation and from that point of view "planning a garden" should be brought into the vision of the young. The experience, that it is up to us to be able to create out of a brown patch of soil a lovely flowerbed, should fill the heart of a small child as well as of the grown up with delight and hopeful joy!" Reflecting on her life and her work, Beate Hahn wrote: "In 1945 UNRRA asked me to build up a model place for gardening with children and training teachers for this special field in Germany. Unfortunetely I could not accept, because my own girls were not yet settled- I feel very strongly that those of us who could enjoy the blessings of having escaped Hitlerism, and were permitted to bring up our children in a country where bombs were not falling down should pay back to Europe a contribution if possible by helping the poor in the destroyed countries and in the meantime building up a better understanding with the average American people." Her dedication to gardening and education prompted Beate to spend the winter months in Europe beginning in 1951, teaching, writing, lecturing, creating educational games and broadcasting. She was passionate about sharing her knowledge and inspiring others to create gardens within their communities. Despite being a widow with young children, facing discrimination prior to her emigration to the US, Beate picked up her pre-war career as a horticulturalist, educator and author who dedicated herself to gardening, educating the next generation and giving back to the communities in which she lived and worked.

== Publications (a selection) ==
=== Essays (beginning in 1918) ===
- Gemüseanbau im Treibhaus. (1918)
- Brauchen wir eine Hochschule für Gartenbau? (1918)
- Wie man Kinder für den Garten begeistern kann. (1920)
- Der Tiergarten sollte der Jugend gehören. (1928)

=== Essays (beginning in 1930) ===
- 1930 Dem Gefährten. Handwritten manuscript
- 1936 Ich suche Hauspersonal.
- 1837 Die Geschichte der Barbara Klink. Typed manuscript of a novella.
- 1952 Matilda (Martina). Fictionalized story of a housemaid.
- 1968 Als wir gingen Escape from Berlin 1938.
- 1969 Curriculum vitae.
- undated Erinnerungen an das Haus Bergstraße 2 in Berlin-Wannsee. (Note: The house in the Alsen colony on the left bank of Wannsee, which no longer exists today, once belonged to Beate's parents-in-law Oskar Hahn (1860-1907) and Charlotte Hahn, née Landau (1865-1934).)
- undated Ein Leben mit Gärten und Menschen – ein Gärtnerleben auf zwei Kontinenten. Typed manuscript.

=== Books (commencing in 1935) ===
- Hurra, wir säen und ernten!. Breslau: Bergstadtverlag Wilhelm Gottlieb Korn. 1935. Illustrated by Ursel Bartning.
- Die Gartenfibel für Kinder und Mütter. Zürich: Verlag Max Rascher. 1935. Illustrated by Ursel and Esther Bartning.
- Der Kindergarten, ein Garten der Kinder – ein Gartenbuch für Eltern, Kindergärtnerinnen und Alle, die Kinder liebhaben. Zürich: Verlag Max Rascher. 1936. Illustrated by Ursel Bartning.
- Hurra, wir säen und ernten!. Zürich: Verlag Max Rascher. 1939.
- Die Gartenfibel für Kinder, Eltern und Großeltern. Ein ermunternder Führer durch die zwölf Monate des Gärtnerjahres im Freiland, in der Zimmer- und Balkongärtnerei und ein Wegbereiter für spätere Abenteuer in der Gartenwelt (Auflage I., 1.–4. Tsd. der Schweizer Ausgabe ed.). Zürich: Verlag Max Rascher. 1948.
- Dein Garten wächst mit dir. Ravensburg: Verlag Otto Maier. 1952.
- Gärten für die Jugend mit der Jugend. Ein Handbuch für Erzieher und Lehrer zur Neugestaltung des Gartenbauunterrichts in Kindergärten und Schulen. Zürich: Verlag Max Rascher. 1960.
- Gardening with the Blind. 1961. (Not published.)

=== Articles and Pamphlets in the USA (commencing 1941) ===
- The Heathview Gardening Camp. (1941)
- How to plan a Victory Garden (1942)
- Community Gardens for Europe. (1945)
- Gardens for the Children of the Destroyed Countries. (1946)
- Gardens for the Youth. (1949)
- Planning Your Neighbourhood Park. (1954)
- Community Gardens for Tomorrow. (1956)
- Report on the 3rd European Conference of the Council of European Municipalities. (1956)

=== Games and toys ===
- Garden-Quartett.Illustrated by Esther Bartning. (Otto Maier Verlag Ravensburg, 1936. Ref. No. 5534 and 5535)
- Gartenlotto. illustrated by Esther Bartning. (Spamersche Buchdruckerei, Leipzig, 1937.)
- Gartenblumenquartett. Discussed in correspondence with Otto Maier Verlag in 1938, details about its publication are unknown.[28]
- Gartenlotto. New version with different illustrations. (Otto Maier Verlag Ravensburg, 1953. Ref. No. 5600)
- Gardenlotto. New version in German, French, English. Otto Maier Verlag Ravensburg, 1955. Ref. No. 5600)
- Cut-out sheets for the construction of gardens. (In German, French, English, 1956)
- Wundergarten ohne Erde, Jardin miraculeux sans terre, Wondergarden without soil. (Published with a booklet, Otto Maier Verlag Ravensburg, 1959)

== Awards and honors ==
- 1950 – First Prize for hybridized sunflowers, Flower Show, Wolfeboro, NH
- 1953 – Entered into the Swiss Encyclopedia of Women (in the Lexikon der Frau, 2 volumes Encyclios-Verlag Zurich 1953 and 1954.)
- 1958 – Award of Merit for a collection of hybridized sunflowers, Flower Show, Wolfeboro, NH
- 1960 – Elected as a Member of the American Horticultural Society in "recognition of your active interest in the advances of horticulture and its contributions to the culture of the peoples of the world through the growth, development and dissemination of knowledge of horticultural science".
- 1962 – Citation by the New Hampshire Federation of Garden Clubs for her outstanding work in education and horticulture
- 1962 – "White Ribbon Award" by the US National Council of Garden Clubs for individual achievement in education and gardens
- 2024 – a Street in Berlin-Pankow was named after Beate Hahn. An adjacent street was named after Marianne Foerster, landscape architect, daughter of Karl Foerster and lifelong friend of Beate Hahn's daughters Cornelia and Charlotte.

== Archive ==
In 2022, Beate Hahn's grandchildren donated archival materials, manuscripts, notes and books from their grandmother to Deutsche Gartenbaubbibliothek e.V., which is affiliated with the University Library of Technische Universität Berlin.
