= Ignaz Jastrow =

German economist and historian (1856–1937)

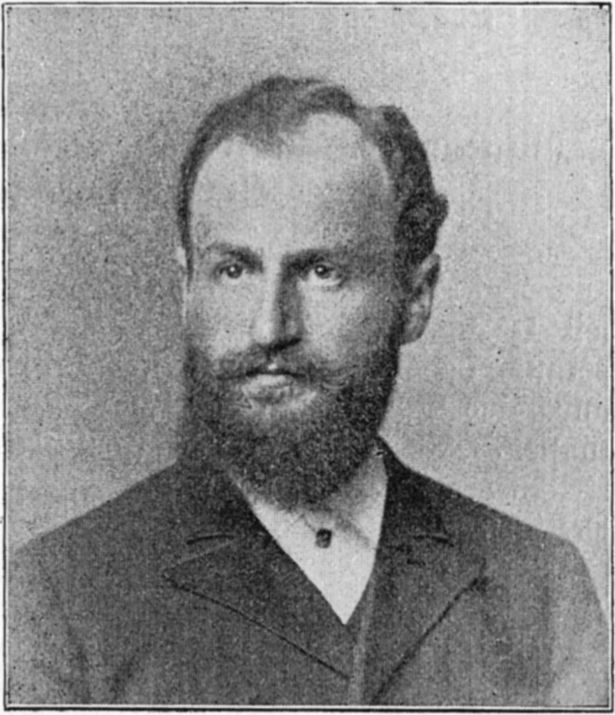
Ignaz Jastrow

Ignaz Jastrow (13 September 1856 in Nakel – 2 May 1937 in Berlin) was a German economist and historian.

== Biography ==
He was educated at the universities of Breslau, Berlin, and Göttingen. He became a university docent at Berlin in 1885 and was Leopold von Ranke's assistant in historical work. In 1904 he pursued industrial investigations in the United States, and in 1905 became professor of Administrative Science at Berlin. One daughter, Elisabeth Jastrow, was a classical archaeologist; the other Beate Jastrow Hahn, was an accomplished horticulturalist and author of 5 books. His granddaughter, Cornelia Oberlander was a highly respected landscape architect.

== Works ==
- Die Volkszahl deutscher Städte zu Ende des Mittelalters und zu Beginn der Neuzeit. Historische Untersuchungen; Heft 1. R. Gaertner. 1886.
- Geschichte des deutschen Einheitstraumes und seiner Erfüllung (1884; fourth edition, 1891)
- Socialliberal (1893, second edition, 1894)
- Die Einrichtung von Arbeitsnachweisverbänden (second edition, 1900)
- Deutsche Geschichte im Zeitalter der Hohenstaufen (1879-1901), with George Winter
- Kaufmannsbildung und Hochschulbildung (1907)
- Bürgertum und Staatsverwaltung (1907)
- Handelshochschulen (1909)
- Gedächtnisrede auf Dunker (1911)
- Arbeiterschutz (1912)
- Geld und Kredit (1914)

He edited the Jahresberichte der Geschichtswissenschaft (1881–94); Sociale Praxis (1895–97); Das Gewerbegericht (1896 et seq.); and Der Arbeitsmarkt (1897 et seq.).
