= Cornelia Oberlander =

Canadian landscape architect (1921–2021)

Cornelia Hahn Oberlander CC OBC
- Born: Cornelia Hahn; 20 June 1921; Muelheim-Ruhr, Germany
- Died: 22 May 2021 (aged 99); Vancouver, Canada
- Education: Harvard University; Smith College
- Occupation: Architect
- Awards: Order of Canada, American Society of Landscape Architects Medal, Sir Geoffrey Jellicoe Award, Governor General's Medal in Landscape Architecture
- Buildings: See list

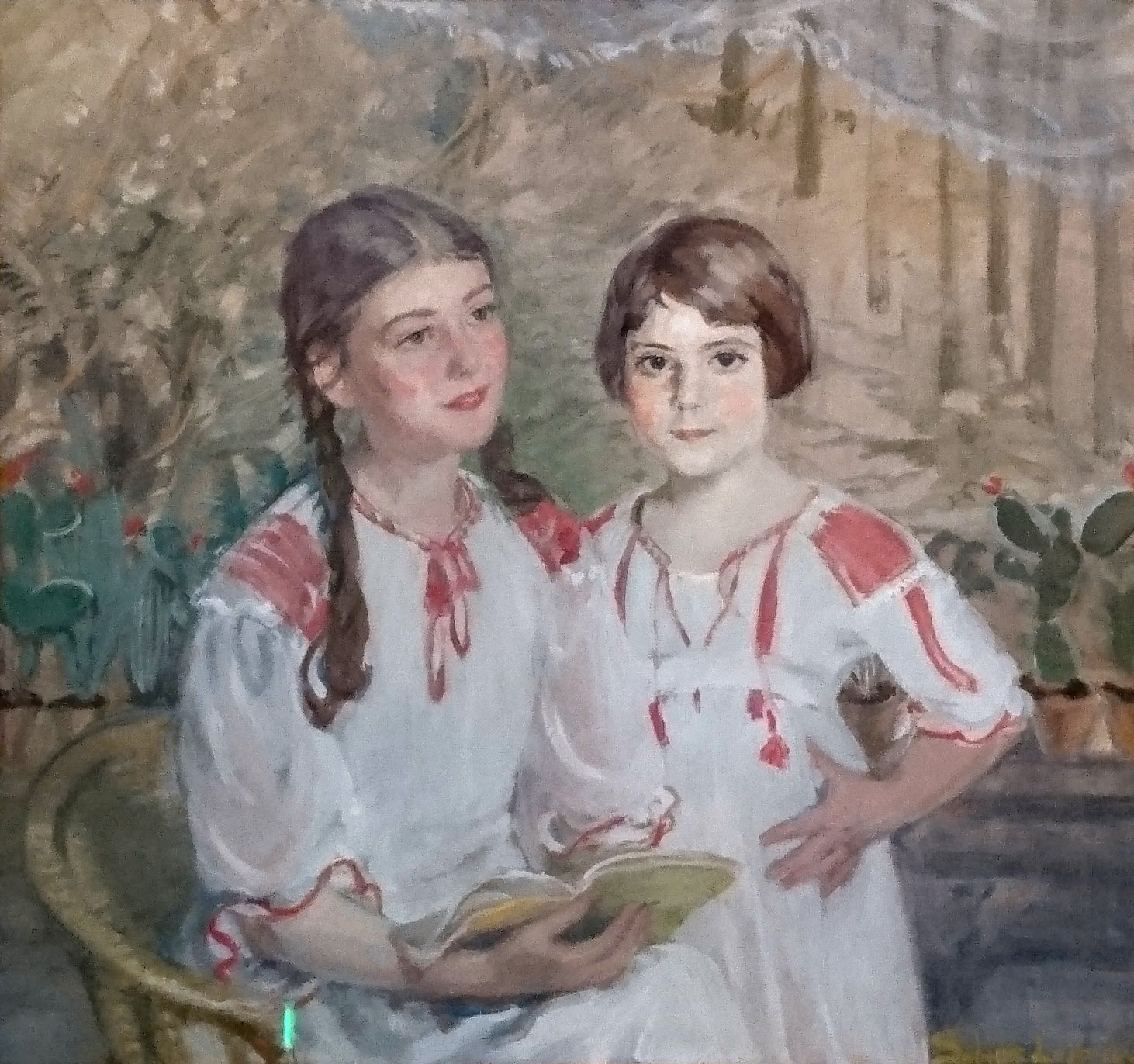
Cornelia (left) and her sister in a 1932 portrait by Sabine Lepsius

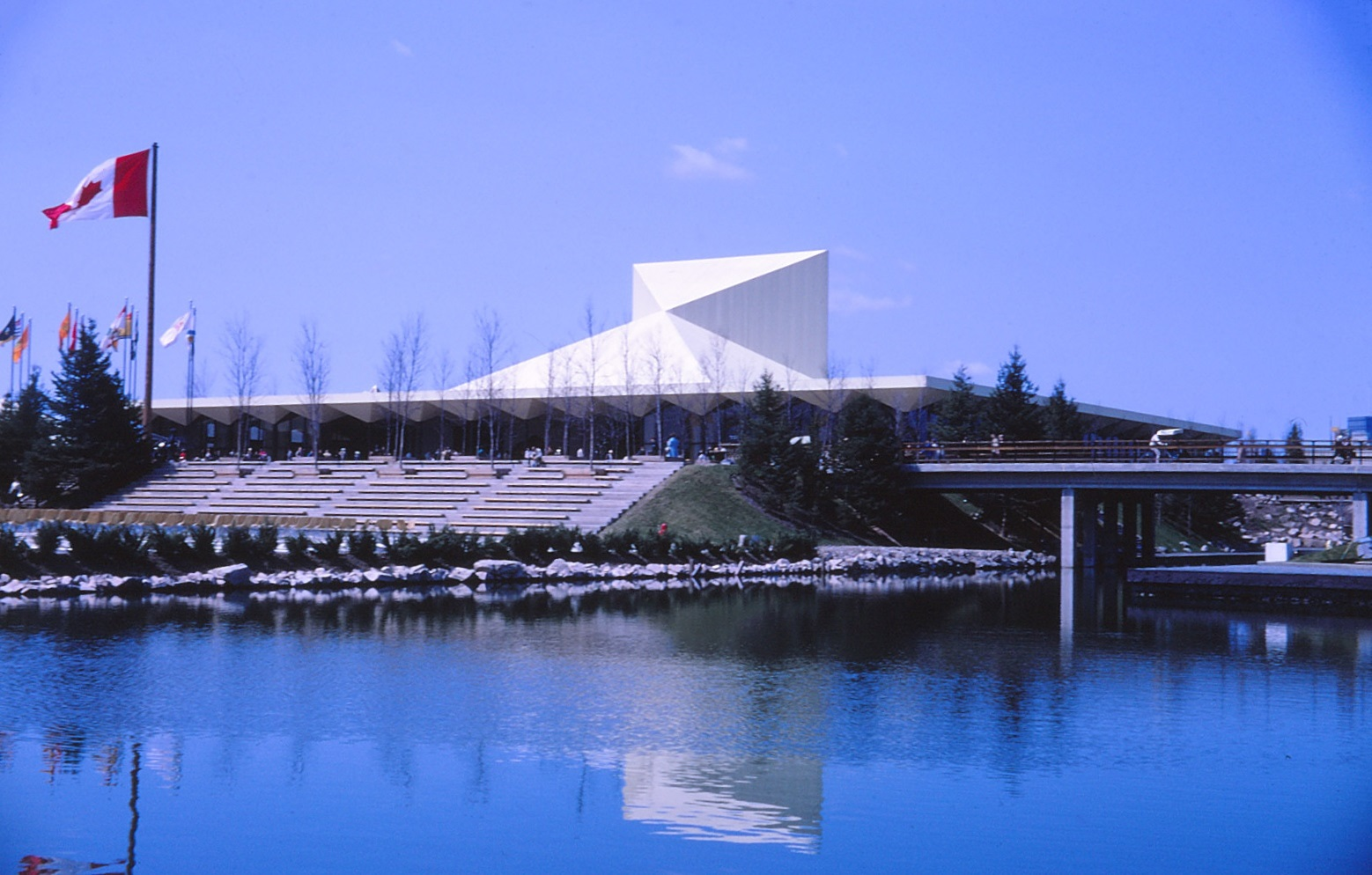
The Canadian Pavilion, Expo '67, Montreal

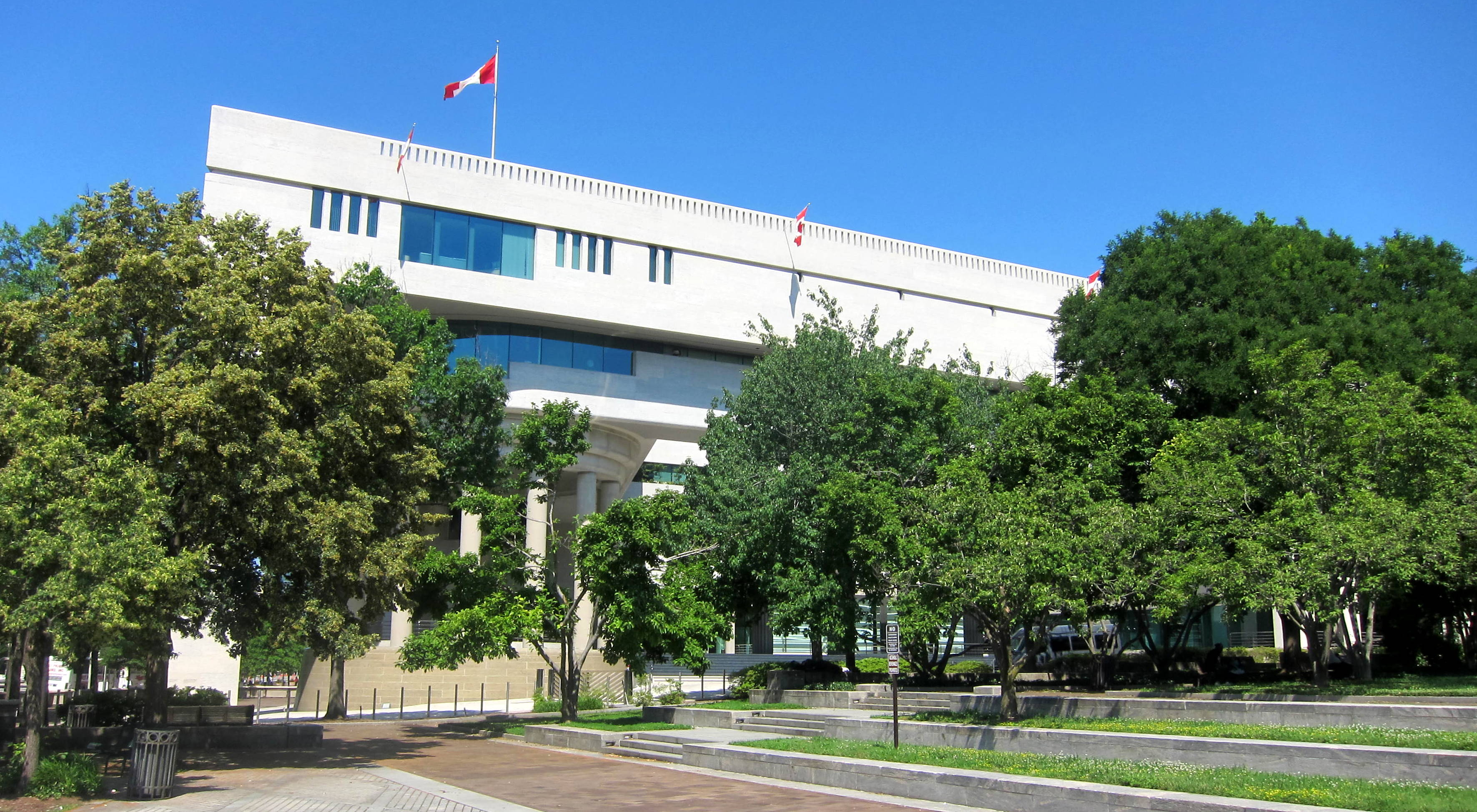
The Canadian Chancery, Washington

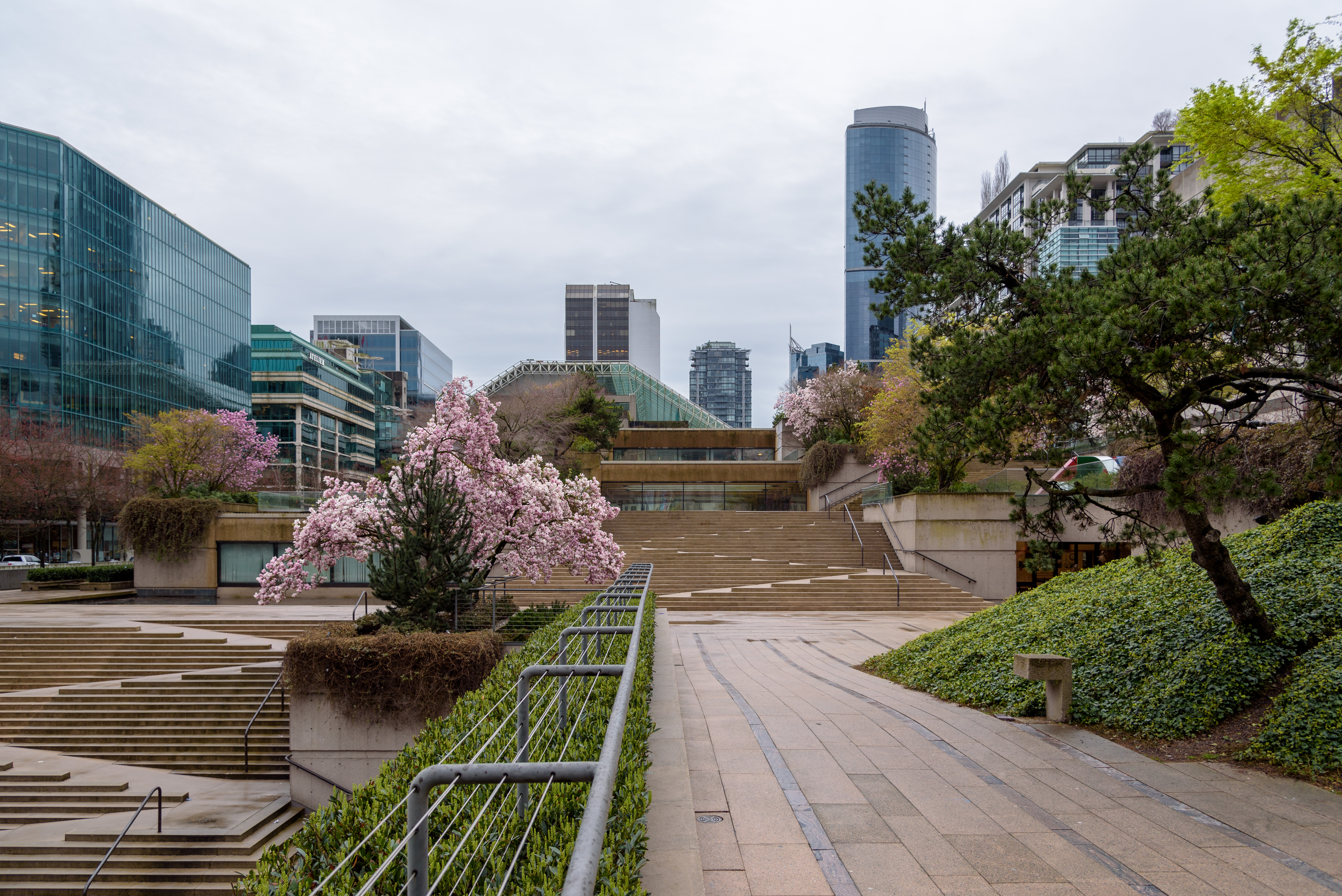
Partial View, Robson Square

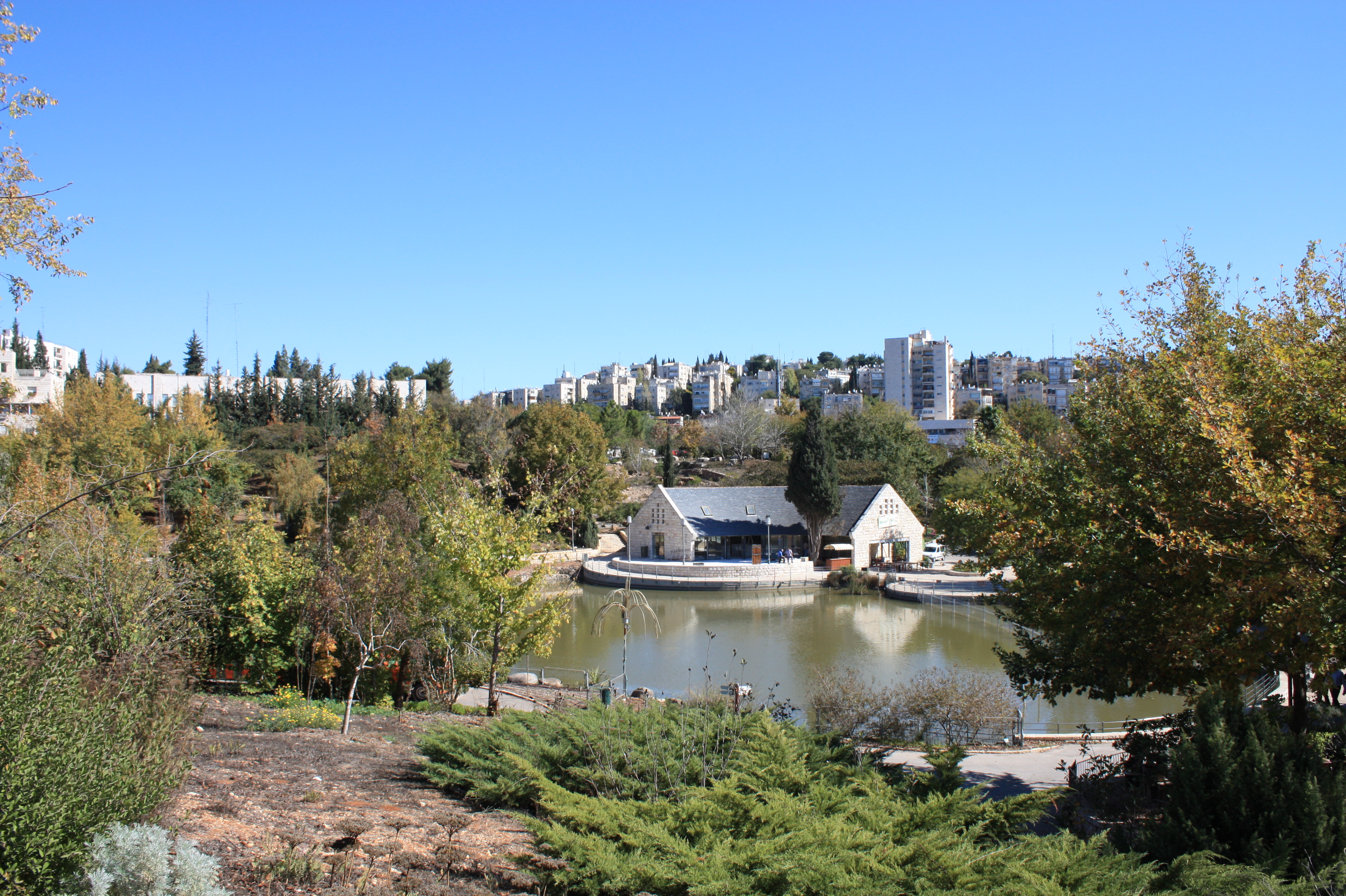
The Botanical Garden at the Hebrew University of Jerusalem

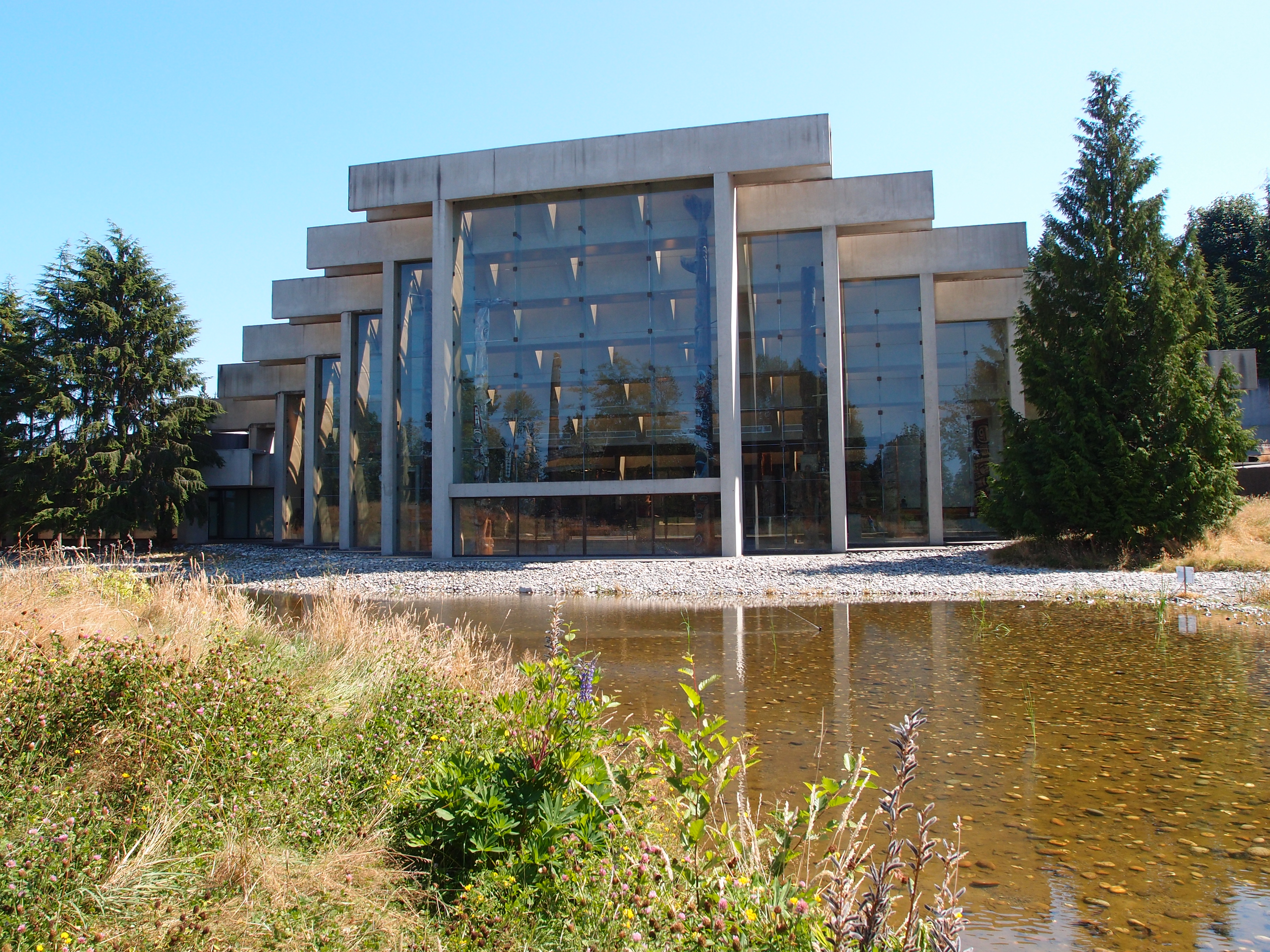
The Museum of Anthropology Reflecting Pool

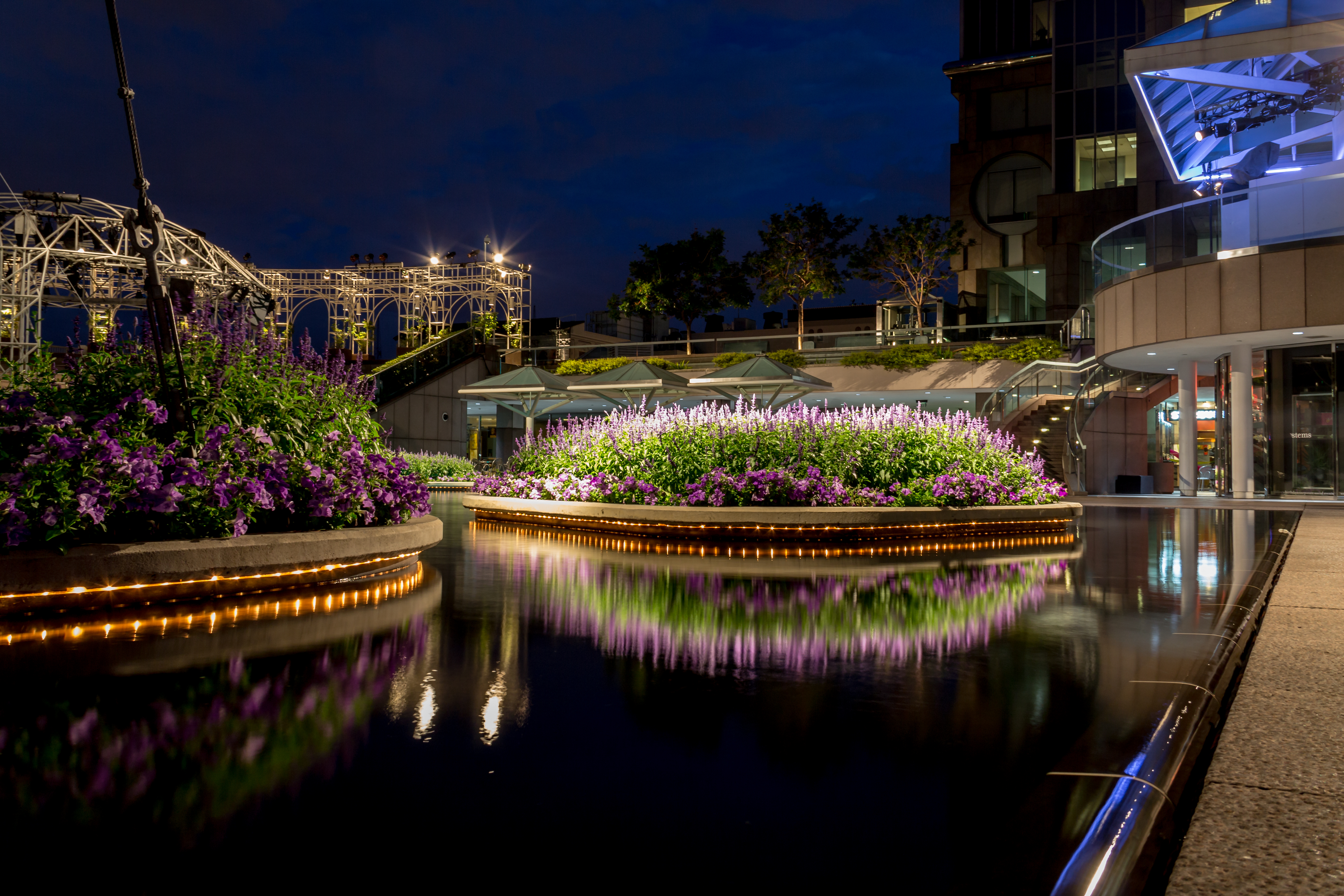
California Plaza

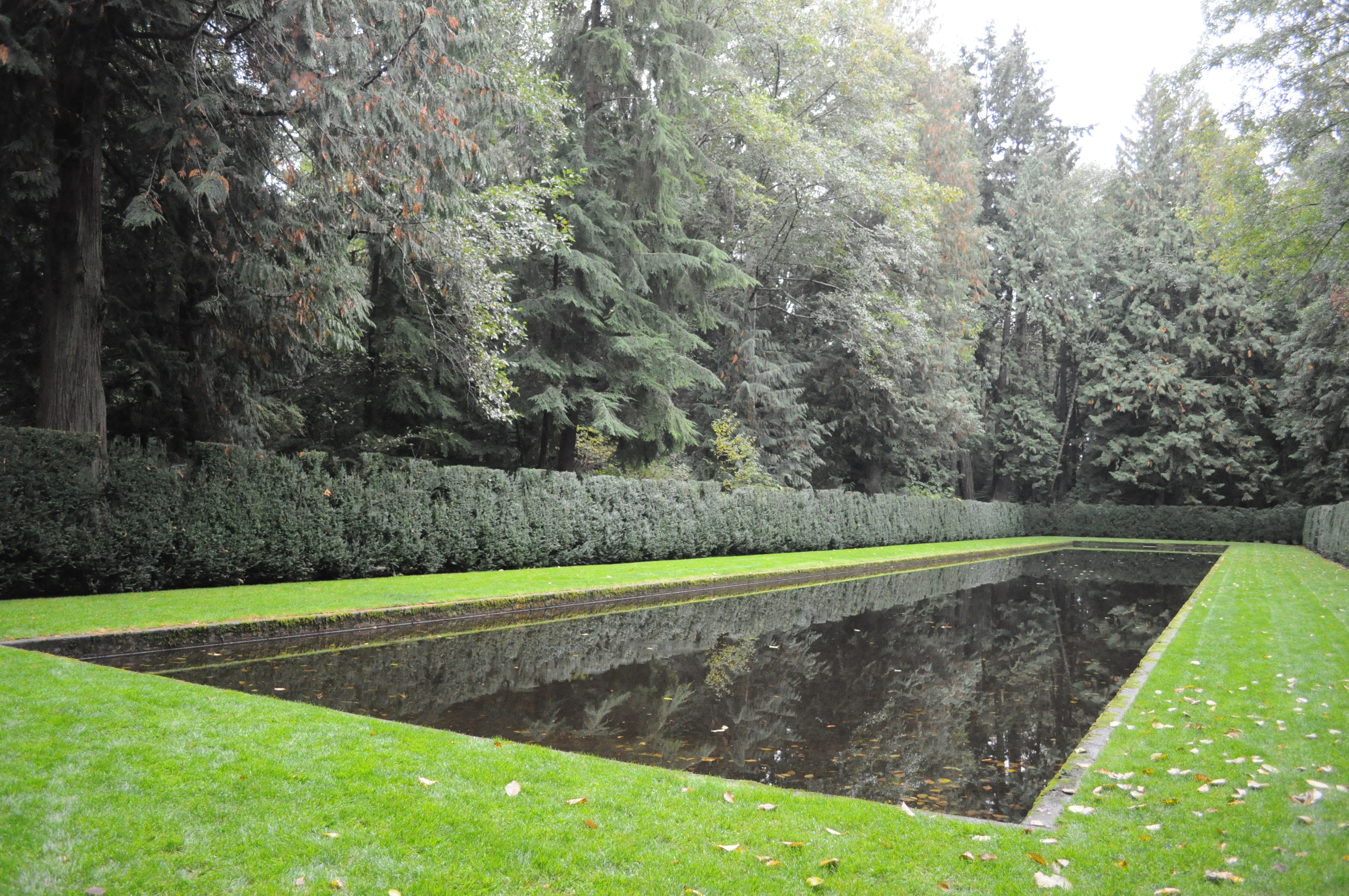
The Bloedel Reserve Reflection Garden

Cornelia Hahn Oberlander CC OBC, MBCSLA, FCSLA, FASLA, LL.D. (20 June 1921 – 22 May 2021) was a Canadian landscape architect. During her career she contributed to the designs of many high-profile buildings in both Canada and the United States, including Robson Square and the adjoining Law Courts Complex in Vancouver, the National Gallery of Canada, the Canadian Chancery in Washington D.C., Vancouver's Library Square, the Museum of Anthropology at the University of British Columbia, and the Northwest Territories Legislative Assembly Building in Yellowknife.

== Early life and education ==
Cornelia Hahn was born at Muelheim-Ruhr, Germany, the eldest of two daughters of Beate Hahn (née Jastrow) and Franz Hahn, who died in a skiing accident in 1933. Cornelia's uncle was educator Kurt Hahn, the founder of Schule Schloss Salem in Germany, Gordonstoun in Scotland, and UWC Atlantic College in Wales. Her aunt Elisabeth Jastrow, was a well-known archaeologist.

A horticulturist who wrote gardening books for children, Beate fostered in her daughter a deep love and appreciation for nature; Cornelia had her own vegetable garden at age four. In an interview with Mechtild Manus, Oberlander said: "At the age of eleven... I studied a mural in the artist's studio showing the river Rhine and an imaginary town. When I asked the artist about the green spaces in this mural, she told me that these were parks. When I came home, I told my mother 'I want to make parks'. From there all my education was directed towards becoming a landscape architect."

The Hahns were Jewish. When Cornelia was 18, with her mother and sister Charlotte, she escaped Nazi persecution after Kristallnacht by fleeing to England. They emigrated to the United States in 1939, and settled first in New York, then in New Hampshire, where her mother created a truck farm. Cornelia attended Smith College, graduating in 1944 with a BA. She then went to the Graduate School of Design at Harvard University, where she studied under Walter Gropius and, in 1947, became one of first to earn a degree in Landscape Architecture. At a class picnic, she met architect Peter Oberlander. Born in Vienna, he too had fled with his family from the Nazis in 1938 and had earned a PhD in Regional planning from Harvard. They married in 1953 and moved to Vancouver where, at the University of British Columbia (UBC), Peter became Canada's first professor of Urban and Regional Planning.

== Career ==
In 1950, Oberlander was hired as a community planner with the Citizen's Council on City Planning in Philadelphia. From 1951 to 1953, she worked for architects Louis Kahn and Oscar Stonorov, and landscape architect Dan Kiley, in Philadelphia where, for the Mill Creek Public Housing Project, she designed her first playground. She worked for in Vermont then, in Vancouver, founded her own firm, Cornelia Hahn Oberlander Landscape Architects. Oberlander then became interested in the modern art movement led by B. C. Binning and Ned Pratt, which combined art and architecture to address the connections between urbanism and surrounding natural settings.

While she completed many private gardens, the early years of Oberlander's practice were mostly dedicated to designing playgrounds and landscapes for low-income housing projects; over the course of her career, she designed 70 playgrounds in Canada, including the Canadian Pavilion's Children's Creative Centre at Expo 67 in Montreal. All of her playgrounds had vegetable gardens and picnic areas; in the case of Vancouver's Skeena Terrace, she included play sculptures of her own design. Throughout her career, she conducted significant research into pediatry and pedagogy, and children's interests and activities, and urged city planners and developers to recognize playgrounds as important sites for childhood development and to include them in new construction. She emphasized the social benefits generated by free play and independent discovery, and provided practical proposals for the formulation of new playgrounds. In 1974, she was a member of the National Task Force on Children's Play established by the Canadian Council of Child and Youth Advocates. In 2022, her research was gathered into the Concordia University publication Cornelia Hahn Oberlander on Pedagogical Playgrounds.

She later practiced on a more commercial scale, working with architects and other professionals from various disciplines to create aesthetic solutions for challenging projects. Before beginning a project she researched it thoroughly to ensure that her innovative schemes would be practical and long-lasting. Sometimes, her innovations needed no research at all. In 1964, she discovered that, when orphaned tree logs washed up on Vancouver's shores, the city was burning them—Oberlander quickly convinced the city to keep the logs for seating and shelter, a practice which was immediately adopted and is now standard. She always approached a project from an environmental standpoint. In her Convocation Address for the acceptance of an honorary degree from Simon Fraser University she stated: "I dream of Green Cities with Green Buildings where rural and urban activities live in harmony... "Achieving a fit" between the built form and the land has been my dictum. This can only be done if all our design-related professions collaborate and thereby demonstrate co-operatively their relevance in meeting the enormous developmental challenges facing our increasingly crowded urban regions."

Oberlander's concern for the environment and for people in general, was further exemplified by her involvement with the Hebrew University of Jerusalem on Mount Scopus. Oberlander and her husband, Peter, visited Israel for a congress with the International Federation of Landscape Architects in 1962. According to the Jewish Independent, the Oberlanders were in Israel to study irrigation systems, but they "fell more deeply in love with the land and its people". The Oberlanders engaged in and spearheaded many activities to benefit the university from 1979 on, including: setting up a Canadian Studies Program, bringing boxes of Canadian textbooks to Israel for donation to the university, developing a botanical garden, working with a team of planners to assist the community of Ashkalon in accommodating settlers from North Africa and Georgia, and advocating for the restoration of historic buildings on the campus. The Oberlanders were honored for their contributions by the Vancouver chapter of Canadian Friends of the Hebrew University of Jerusalem in 2004 and they visited Israel many times in their philanthropic efforts.

Oberlander received the "rare and exceptional honour" of being elected to both the Canadian Society of Landscape Architects' College of Fellows (in 1981) and the American Society of Landscape Architects' Council of Fellows (in 1992).

In 1999–2000, she contributed her expertise to the Vancouver Art Gallery for its "Out of This Century" exhibition, guiding patrons through the selection of visual art pieces that were chosen from the permanent collection of the gallery (by Oberlander and five other Vancouverites) to reflect and represent the city art scene through the decades. In 2018, she completed a redesign of the National Gallery of Canada's Fred & Elizabeth Fountain Garden Court. She also had designed its predecessor.

== Awards and honours ==
- 1981: Fellow, Canadian Society of Landscape Architects
- 1990: Member of the Order of Canada
- 1991: Doctor of Laws, honoris causa, University of British Columbia
- 1992: Fellow, American Society of Landscape Architects
- 1992: 125th Anniversary of the Confederation of Canada Medal
- 1995: Allied Medal, Royal Architectural Institute of Canada
- 1997: Honorary Member Architectural Institute of British Columbia
- 2001: Doctor of Laws, honoris causa, Ryerson University
- 2002: Doctor of Laws, honoris causa, Smith College
- 2004: Honoree of Canadian Friends of the Hebrew University of Jerusalem
- 2005: Doctor of Laws, honoris causa, Simon Fraser University
- 2008: Doctor of Laws, honoris causa, McGill University
- 2008: Doctor of Laws, honoris causa, Dalhousie University
- 2009: Officer of the Order of Canada
- 2011: Sir Geoffrey Jellicoe Award of the International Federation of Landscape Architects
- 2012: American Society of Landscape Architects Medal
- 2014: Doctor of Laws, honoris causa, University of Calgary
- 2015: Margolese National Design for Living Prize
- 2015: One of Chatelaine Magazine's Women of the Year.
- 2016: Governor General's Medal in Landscape Architecture, Inaugural Recipient
- 2016: Member of the Order of British Columbia
- 2017: Companion of the Order of Canada
- 2017: LAF Medal of the Landscape Architecture Foundation
- 2018: Profiled in the 2018 documentary film, City Dreamers, alongside Phyllis Lambert, Blanche Lemco van Ginkel, and Denise Scott Brown, as women who shaped the world we live in.
- 2021: First award of The Cornelia Hahn Oberlander International Landscape Architecture Prize, created by The Cultural Landscape Foundation (TCLF) to honor the works of Cornelia and her dedication to the profession of Landscape Architecture. Additionally, the TCLF named this prize in Oberlander's name to recognize her efforts to address social, environmental, and ecological issues through her design work. This prize will be awarded every other year. This is the only award in the profession of Landscape Architecture that includes a $100,000.00 prize.

== Works ==
(List does not include residential gardens and school playgrounds.)

- Gold Star Park, Philadelphia 1950
- Schuylkill Falls, Philadelphia 1952
- Mill Creek Housing Playground, Philadelphia 1952
- Cherokee Apartments, Philadelphia 1954
- Philadelphia International Airport 1954
- Betty and Milton Katz Jewish Community Center, New Jersey 1954
- Philadelphia Home for the Aged, Philadelphia 1955
- Powell River Mill, Powell River, BC 1955
- UBC School of Architecture, Vancouver 1956
- Collingwood-Norquay Village, Vancouver 1956
- Western Canada Steel, Mitchell Island, BC 1956
- Canada Kenworth Trucks, Vancouver 1956
- Saint Christopher's Church, West Vancouver 1956
- Little Mountain, Vancouver 1956
- University Faculty Club, UBC, Vancouver 1957
- Earl's Court Children's Home, Vancouver 1957
- Heather Pavilion, Vancouver General Hospital 1957
- Brentwood Industrial Park, Burnaby, BC 1960
- MacLean Park Housing Project, Vancouver 1960
- Skeena Terrace Housing Project, Vancouver 1960
- Keauhou Resort, Keauhou Bay, Hawaii 1961
- Kitimat Centennial Square, Kitimat, BC 1962
- North Shore Neighbourhood House, North Vancouver 1968
- Acadia Park, UBC, Vancouver 1968
- TRIUMF Circle, UBC, Vancouver 1970
- Saturna Island Cottages Development 1970
- Marine Gardens for Habitat I, Vancouver 1971
- Bob Berwick Memorial Centre at UBC, Vancouver 1976
- Museum of Anthropology at UBC, Vancouver 1977
- Afton Mine, Kamloops, BC 1978
- Haro Park Seniors Centre, Vancouver 1979
- The Laxton Evergreen Building, Vancouver 1979
- Bloedel Reserve, Bainbridge Island, WA 1981
- Granville Island Playground, Vancouver 1981
- Robson Square Vancouver 1982
- Victoria General Hospital, Victoria, BC 1982
- Discovery Parks, BCIT, Burnaby, BC 1982
- Montiverdi Estates, West Vancouver 1982
- Vancouver Art Gallery 1982
- Simon Fraser University Mall Extension, Burnaby BC 1982
- Maitland Housing Project, Victoria BC 1982
- Farrell Estates, Richmond, BC 1982
- Canada Place Promenade, Vancouver 1983
- Discovery Parks, Simon Fraser University, Burnaby, BC 1984
- Discovery Parks, UBC, Vancouver 1984
- BC Place Stadium Park, Vancouver 1985
- Red Deer Polytechnic Arts Centre, Red Deer AB 1986
- Pan Pacific Hotel, Vancouver 1984
- Gray Beverage Company, Vancouver 1984
- Terminal City Club Tower, Vancouver 1984
- World Trade Centre Interior, Vancouver 1985
- Ontario Pavilion, Expo 86, Vancouver 1986
- Bank of British Columbia Building, Vancouver 1987
- Greeves Equestrain Facility, Vancouver 1986
- Louis Brier Home and Hospital, Vancouver 1987
- Temple Sholom, Vancouver 1988
- False Creek Yacht Club, Vancouver 1987
- New World Hotel, Vancouver 1988
- Les Terraces, West Vancouver 1988
- National Gallery of Canada, Ottawa 1988
- Environmental Science Building & Walter Ward Garden, Trent University, Peterborough ON 1989
- Mariya-Cho International Center, Nagoya 1989
- Ottawa City Hall 1989
- Four Seasons Centre for the Performing Arts, Toronto 1990
- National Gallery of Canada, Ottawa 1990
- Canadian Chancery, Washington, D.C. 1990
- California Plaza, Los Angeles, 1991
- Cathedral Place, Vancouver 1991
- Gateway Shopping Center, Ferndale WA 1991
- The Britannia at Steveston, Richmond, 1990
- Ritsumeikan-UBC House, UBC, Vancouver 1993
- Kwantlen Polytechnic University, Langley BC 1993
- United Nations Peacekeeping Monument, Ottawa, 1993
- Simon Fraser University Student Housing, Burnaby BC 1993
- Thompson Rivers University Commons & Amphitheatre, Kamloops BC 1994
- Canada House, Berlin, 1994
- Arthur Erickson Place Landscape Renovation, Vancouver 1994
- Northwest Territories Legislative Building, Yellowknife 1994
- Vancouver Public Library 1995
- C. K. Choi Building, Institute of Asian Research at UBC, 1996
- Hopcott Road Industrial Hub, Delta 1996
- Chan Centre for the Performing Arts, UBC, Vancouver 1996
- Ecopolis, Vancouver 1996
- Thunderbird Student Residence, UBC, Vancouver 1996
- Smith College Master Plan, 1997
- The Waterfall Building, Vancouver 1997
- Vancouver International Airport First Nations Art Installation 1997
- The Liu Institute for Global Issues, Vancouver, 1998
- Salt Lake City Public Library, 1999
- Commonwealth Square & Art Gallery of Hamilton, Hamilton ON 1999
- Museum of Glass, Tacoma WA 2000
- Portland Hotel, Vancouver 2000
- Holly Park III Housing Development, Seattle 2000
- Vancouver General Hospital Burn Unit Roof Garden, 2000arden
- BC Family Hearing Resource Centre, Surrey BC 2000
- Jim Everett Memorial Park, Vancouver 2001
- New York Times Building Atrium, 2001
- Canada Place Cruise Ship Terminal, Vancouver 2003
- Hebrew University of Jerusalem Botanical Garden, 2004
- VanDusen Botanical Garden Visitors Centre, Vancouver 2011

== Exhibitions ==
- Cornelia Hahn Oberlander: Ecological Landscapes, Canadian Centre for Architecture, Montreal (2006)
- Canadian Megaform, Canadian Centre for Architecture, Montreal (2014-2015)
- New Ways of Living: Jewish Architects in Vancouver 1955-1975 (online), The Jewish Museum and Archives of British Columbia, Vancouver (2016)
- Bauhaus (Canada) 101, University of Manitoba School of Art Gallery, Winnipeg (2020)
- Cornelia Hahn Oberlander: Genius Loci, Art Gallery of Alberta, Edmonton (2021)

== Gallery ==
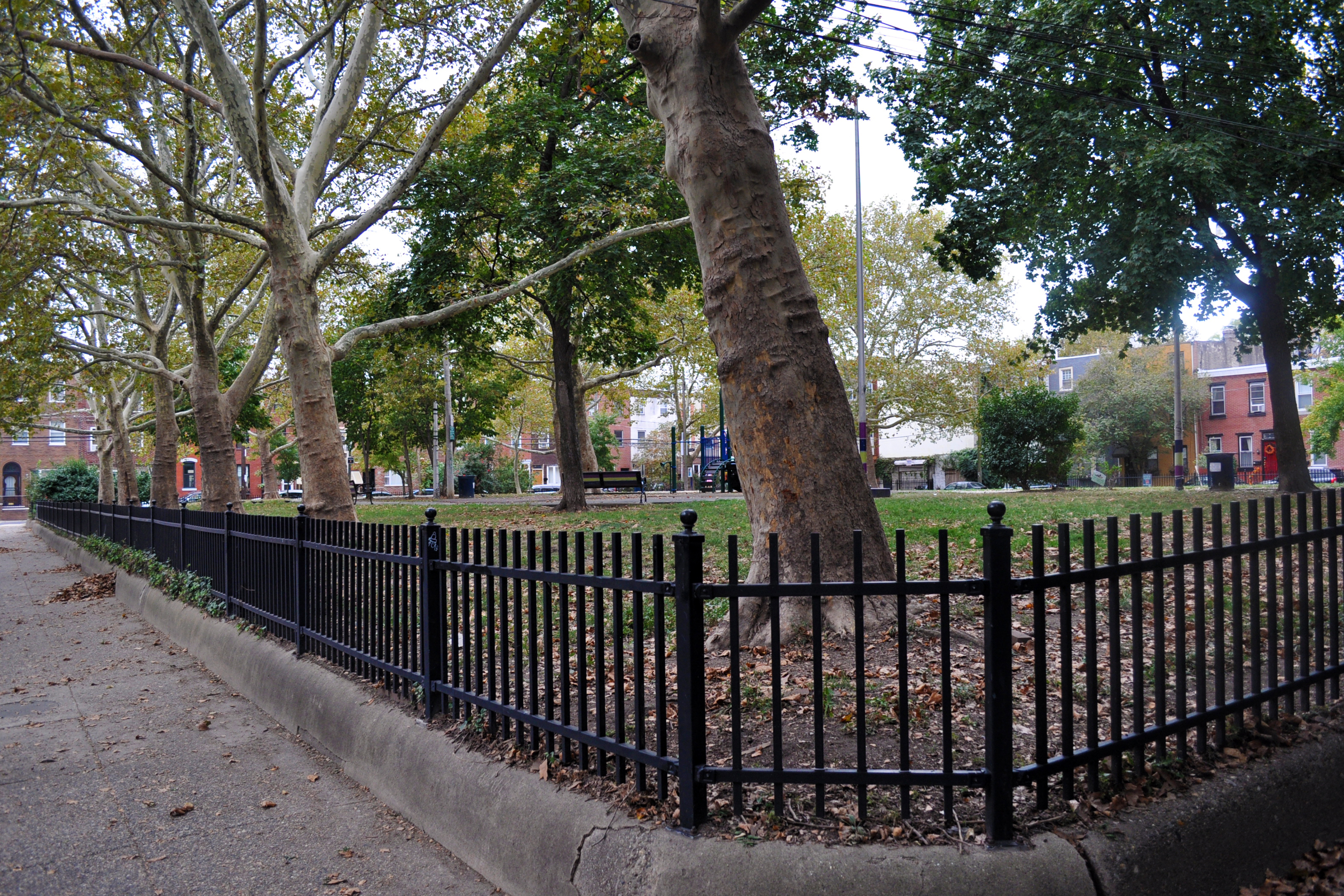
Gold Star Park, Philadelphia

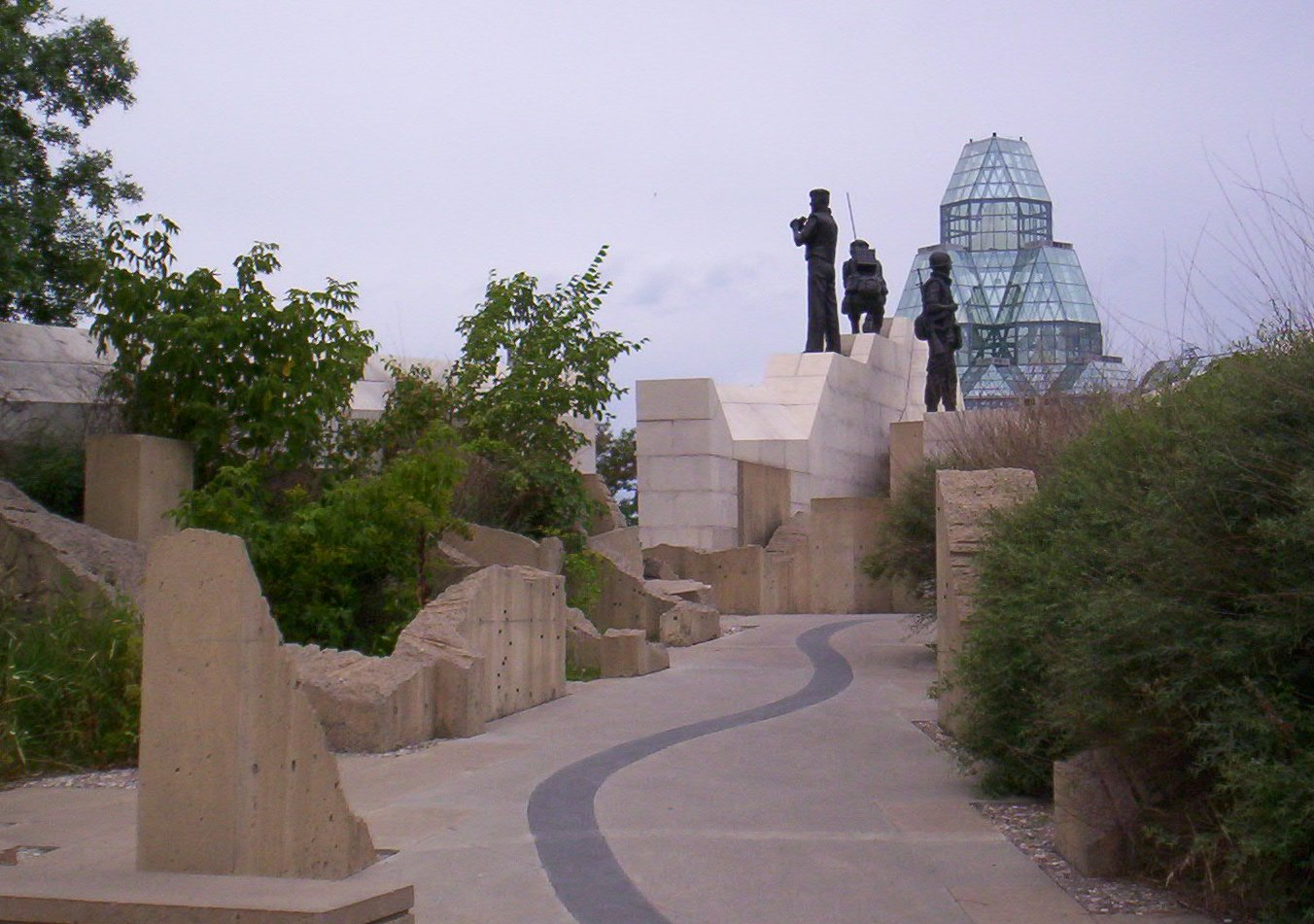
The Peacekeeping Monument, Ottawa

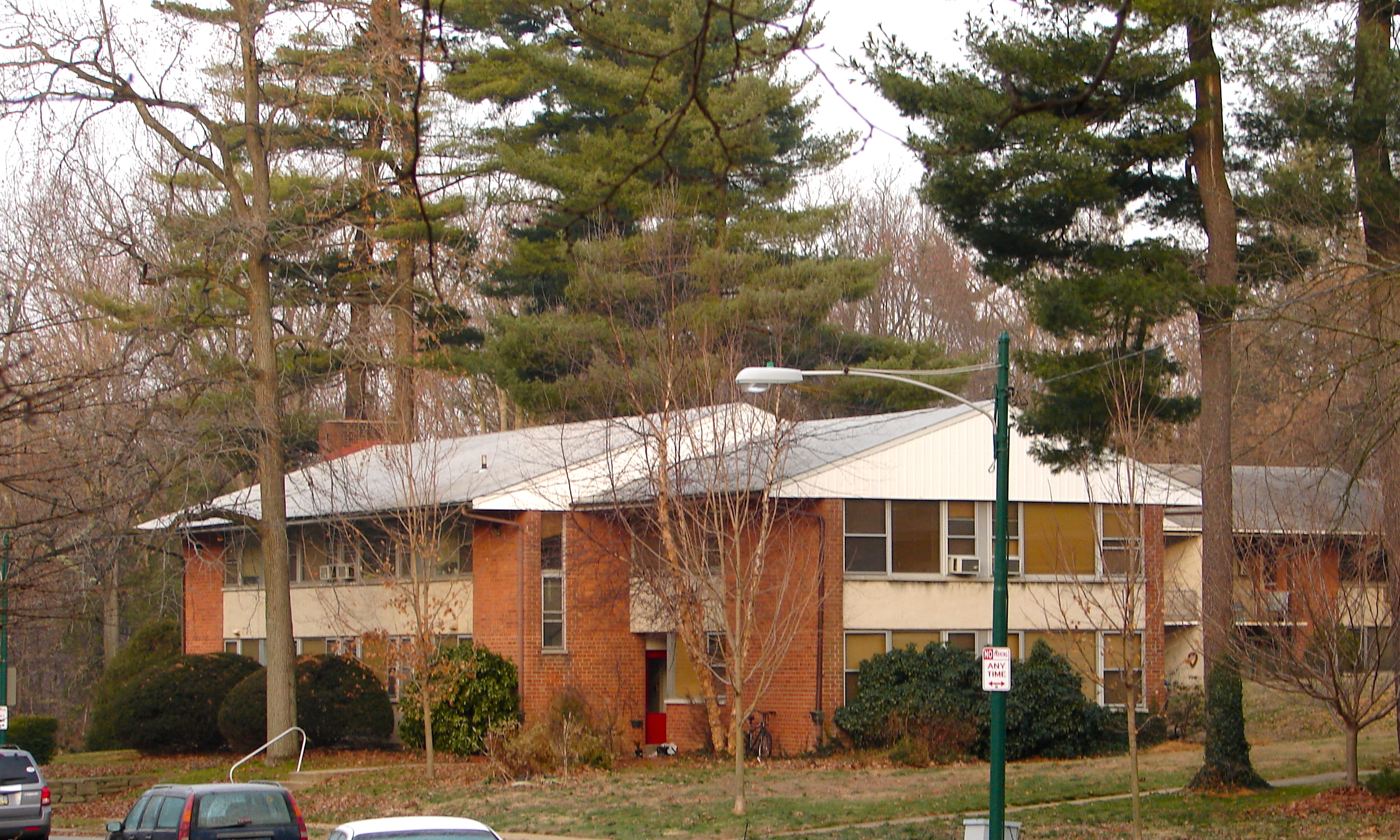
Cherokee Village, Philadelphia

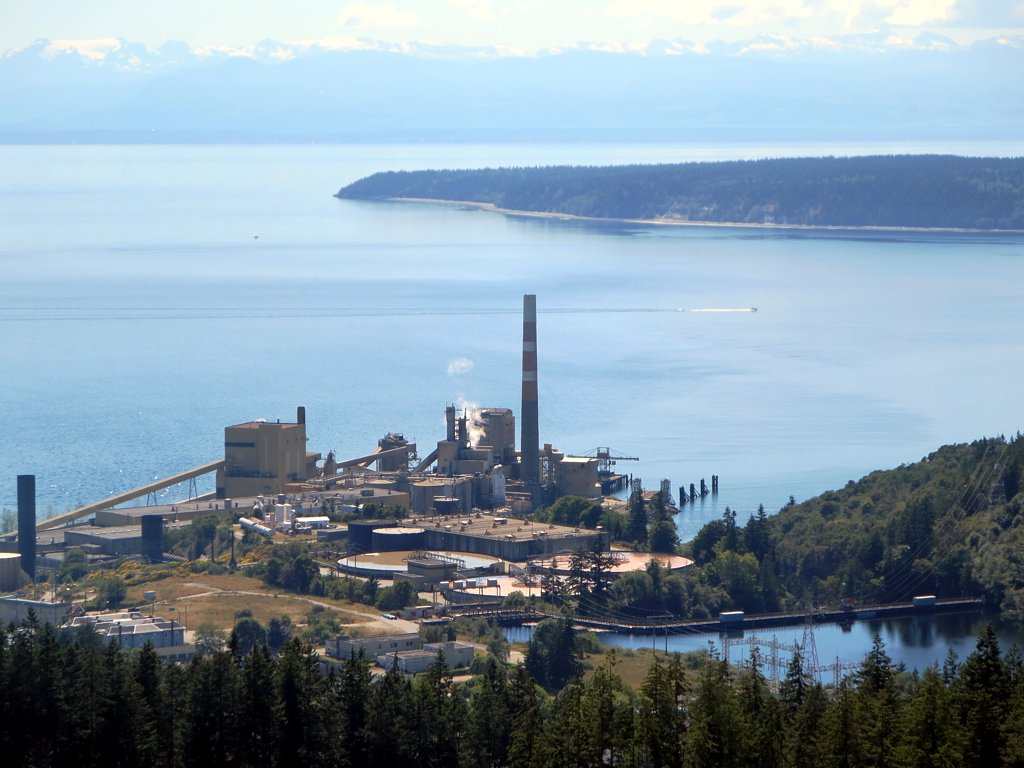
The Powell River Mill

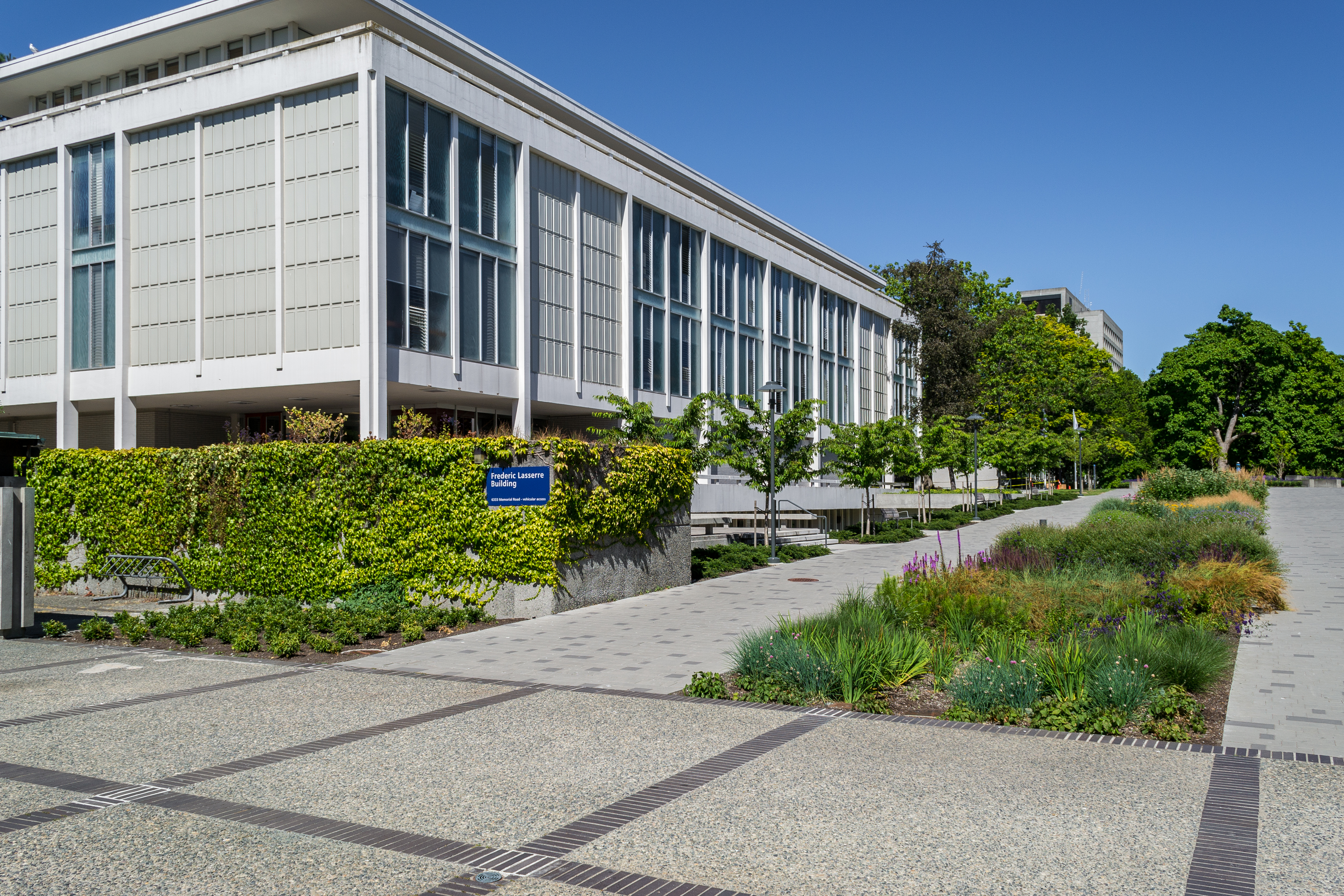
UBC School of Architecture

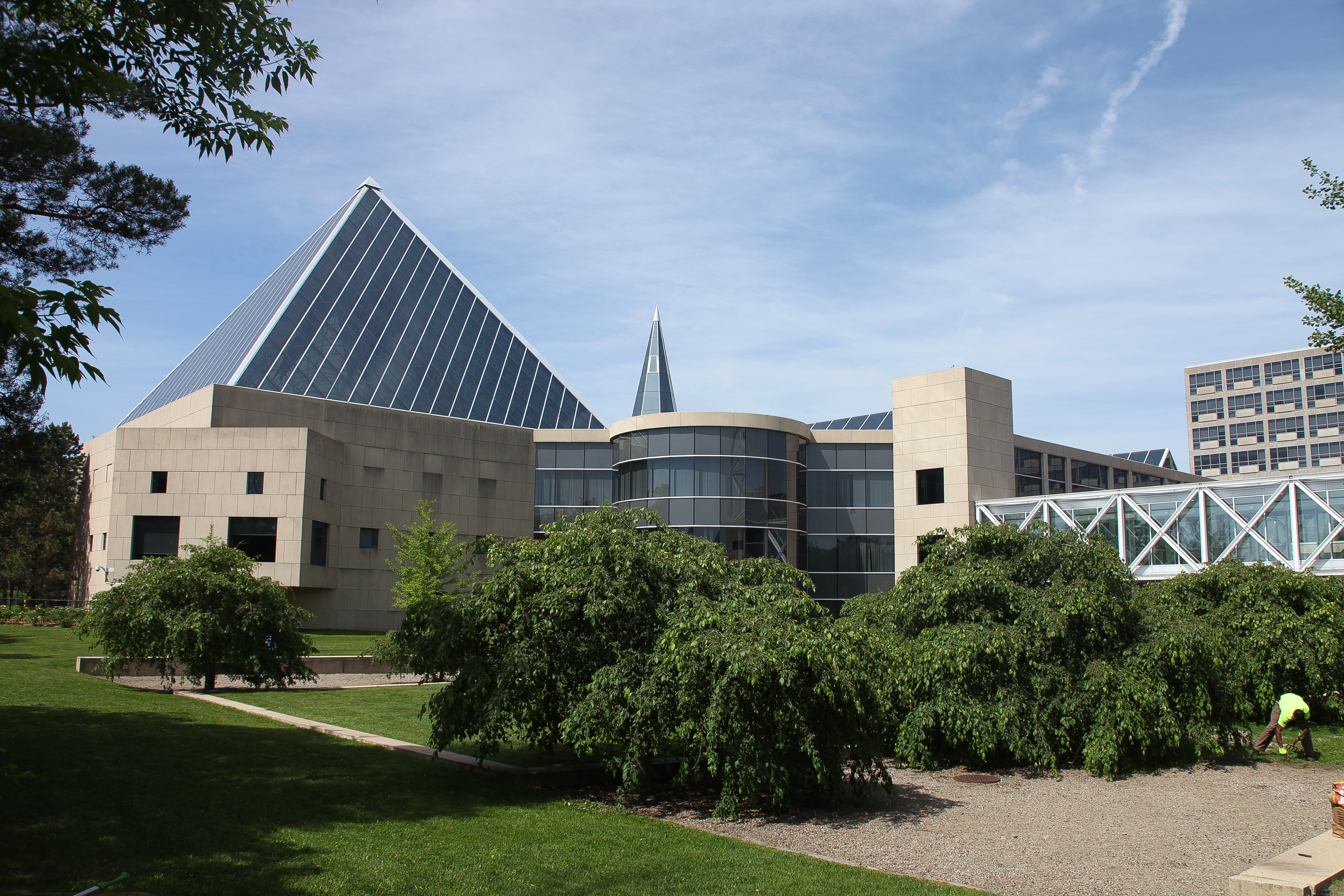
Ottawa City Hall

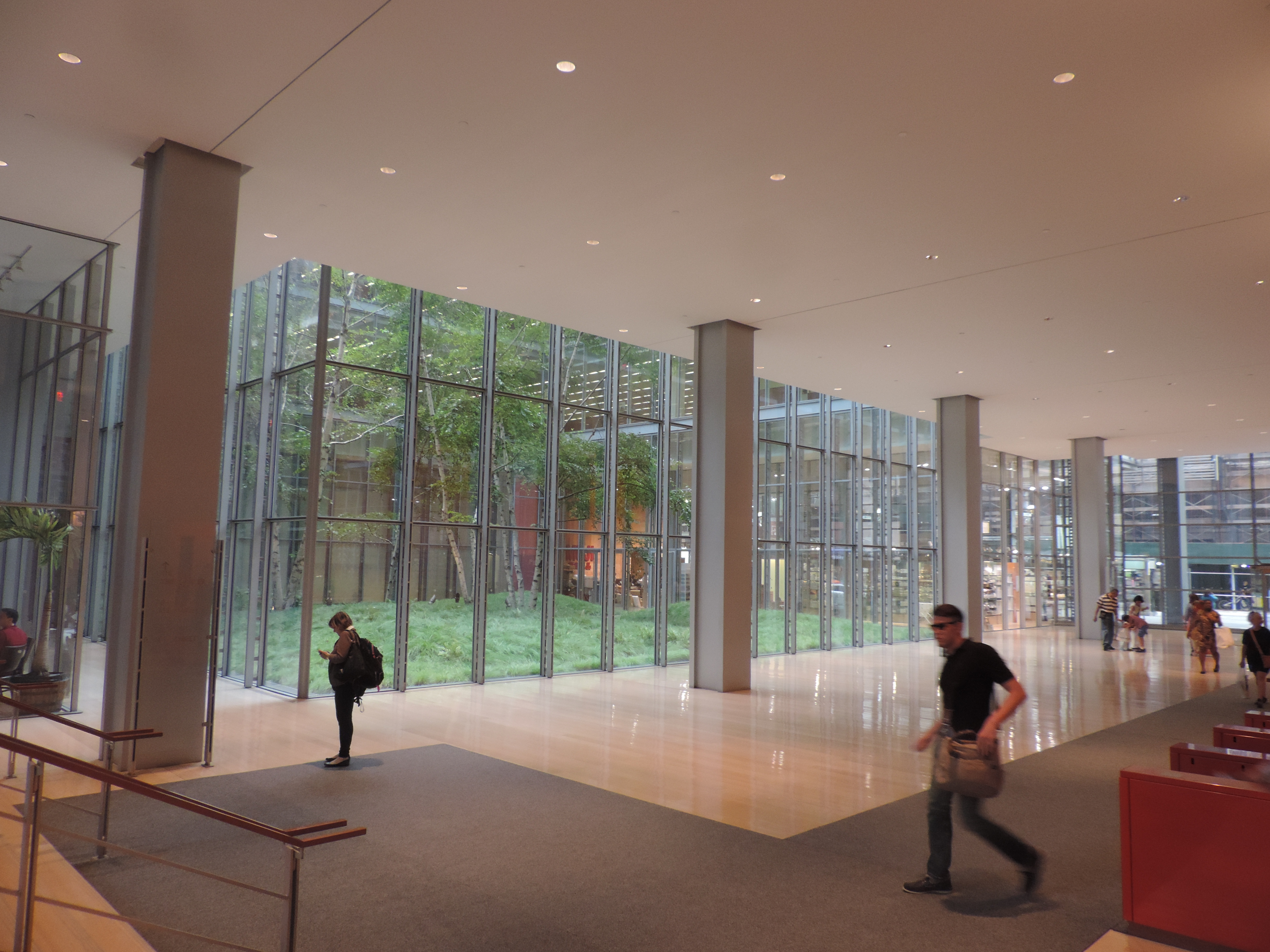
The New York Times Building Atrium

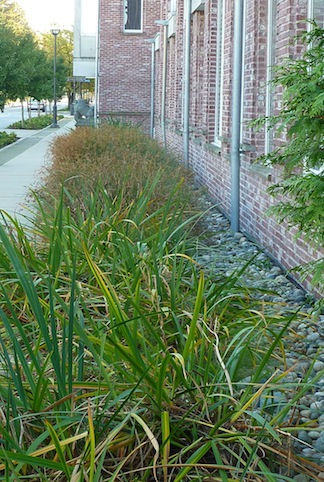
Indigenous Grass Bioswales at the C.K. Choi Building

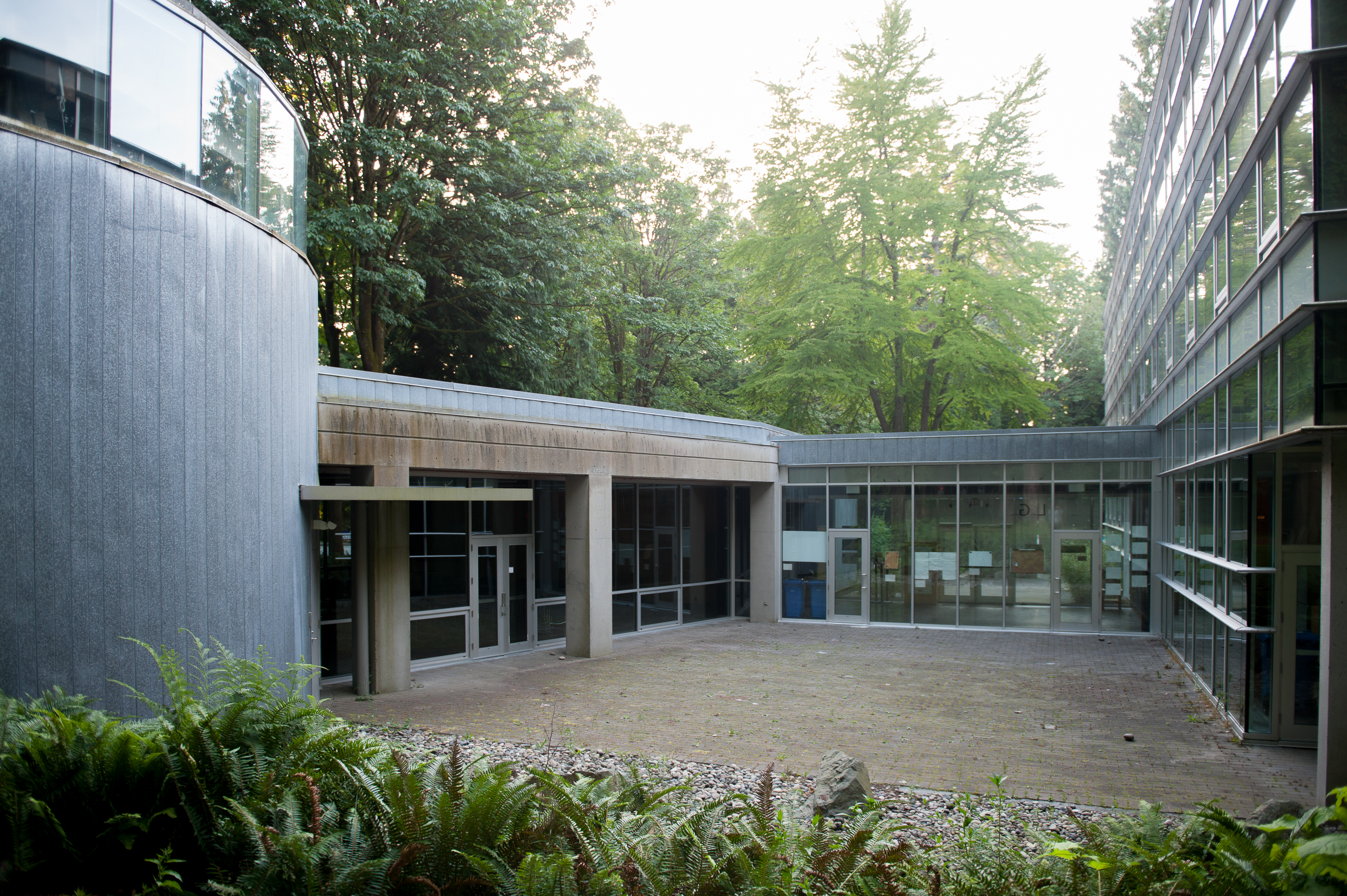
The Liu Institute for Global Issues

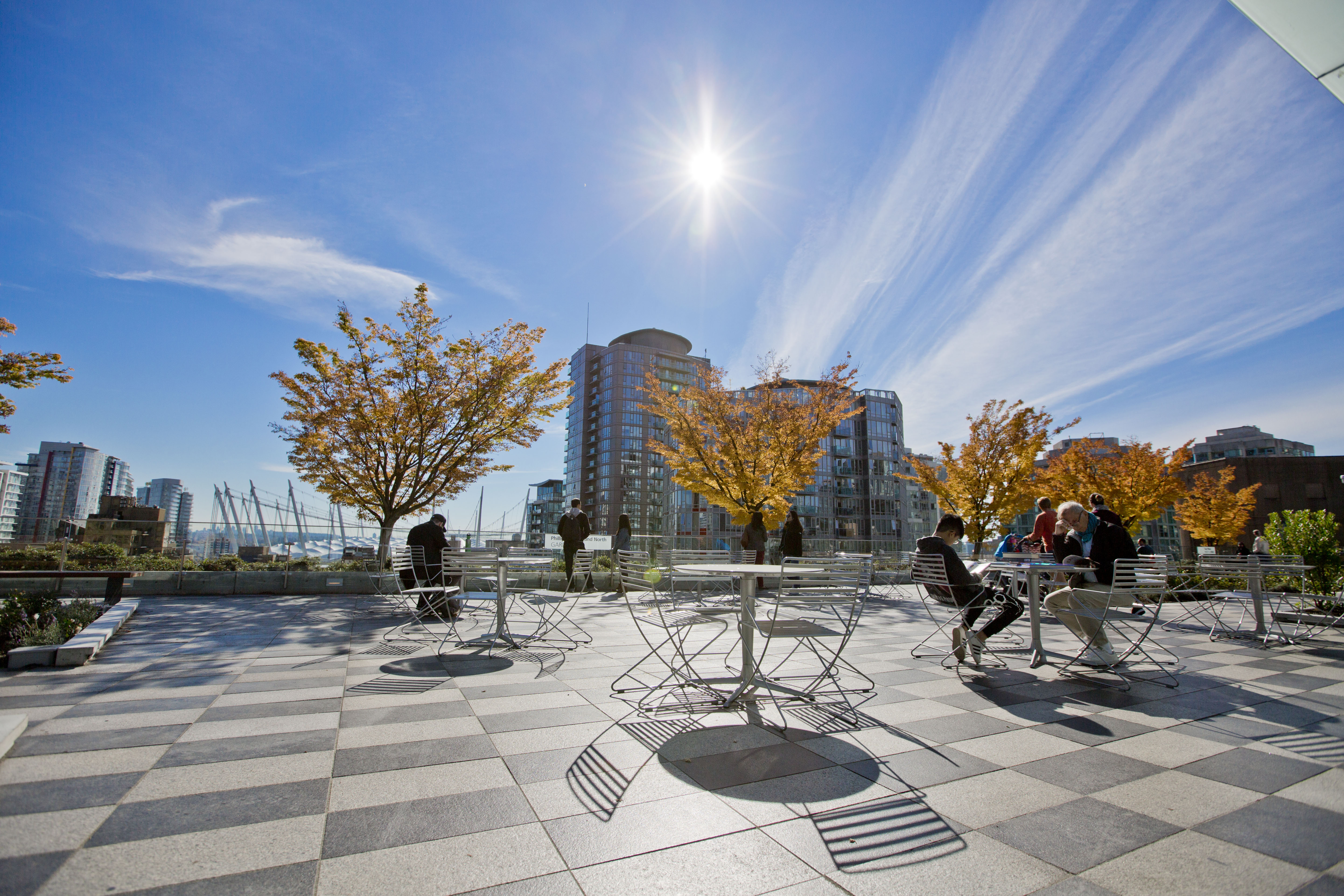
The Vancouver Public Library Roof Garden

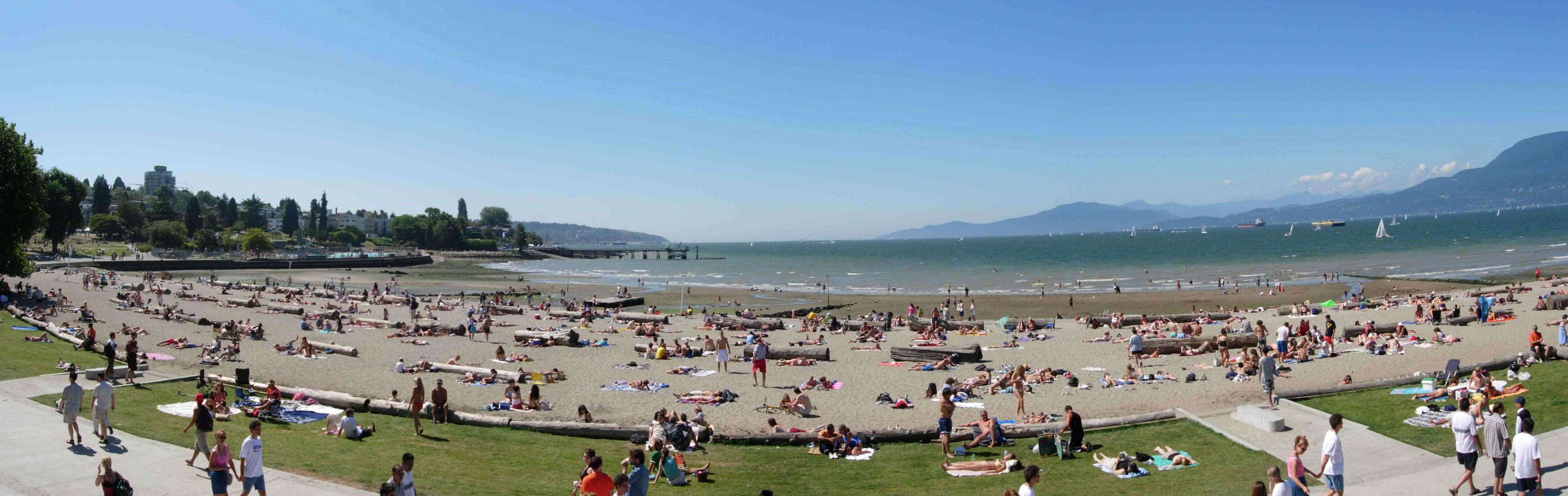
Log Seating at Kitsilano Beach, Vancouver

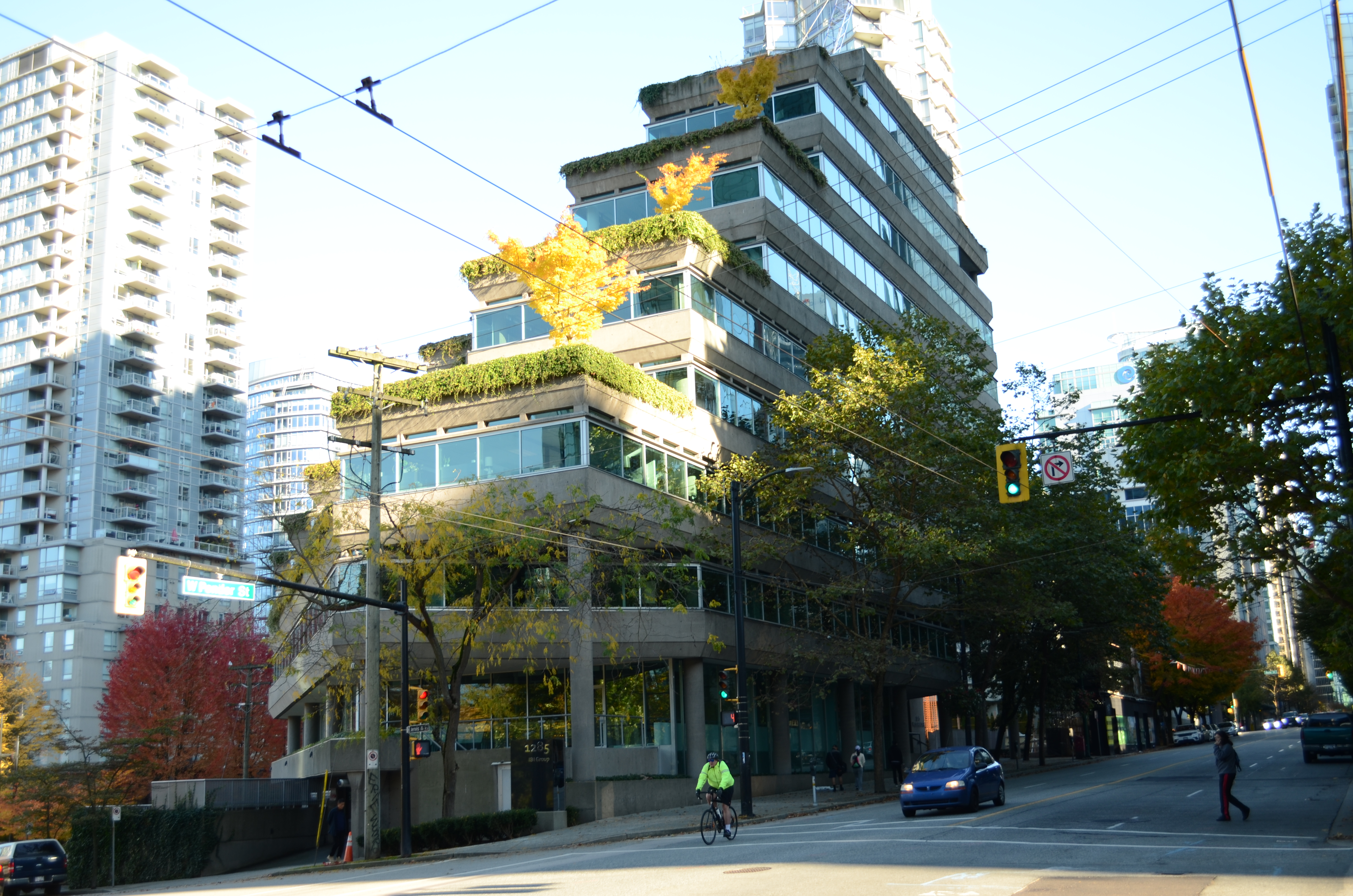
The Laxton Evergreen Building

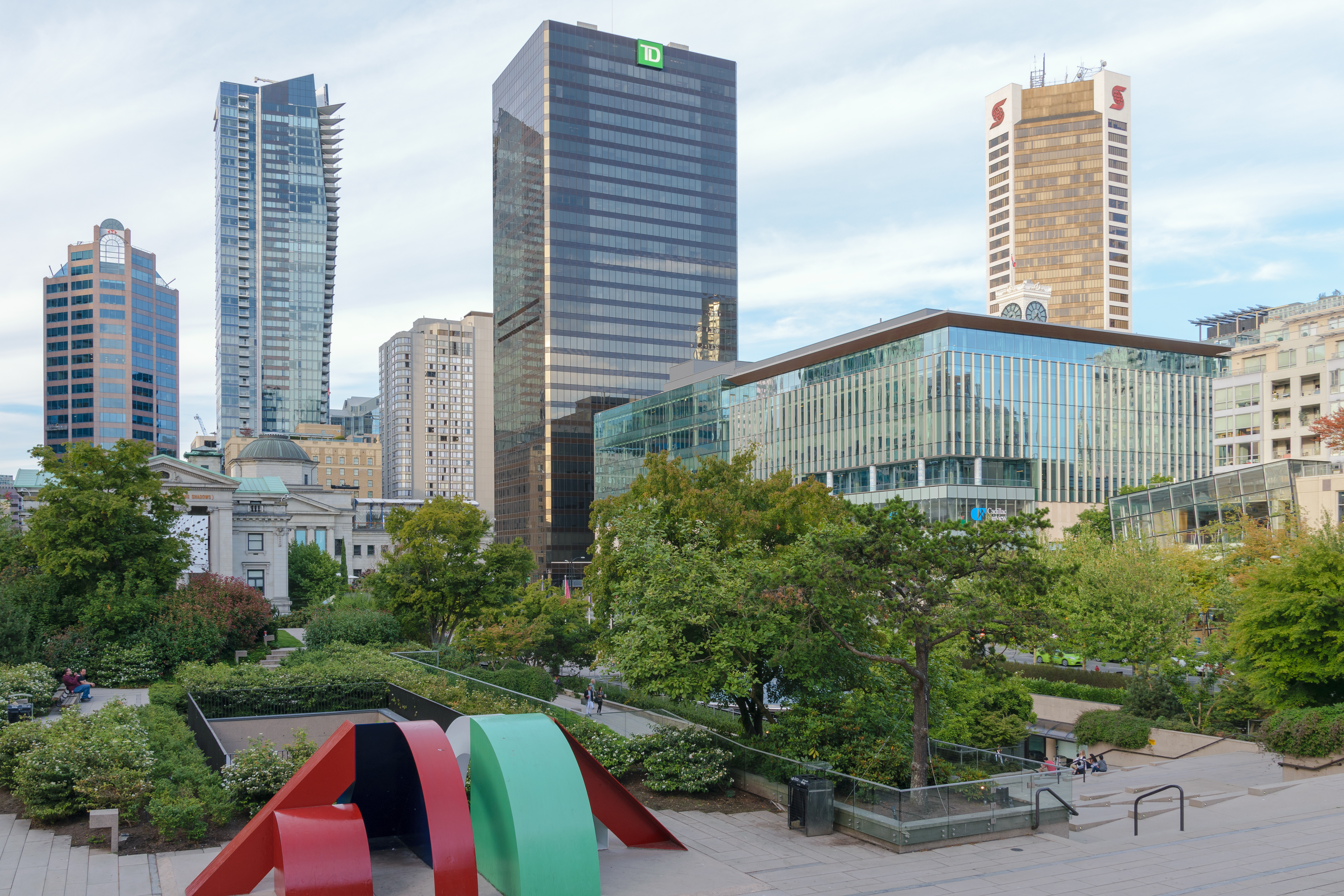
Robson Square

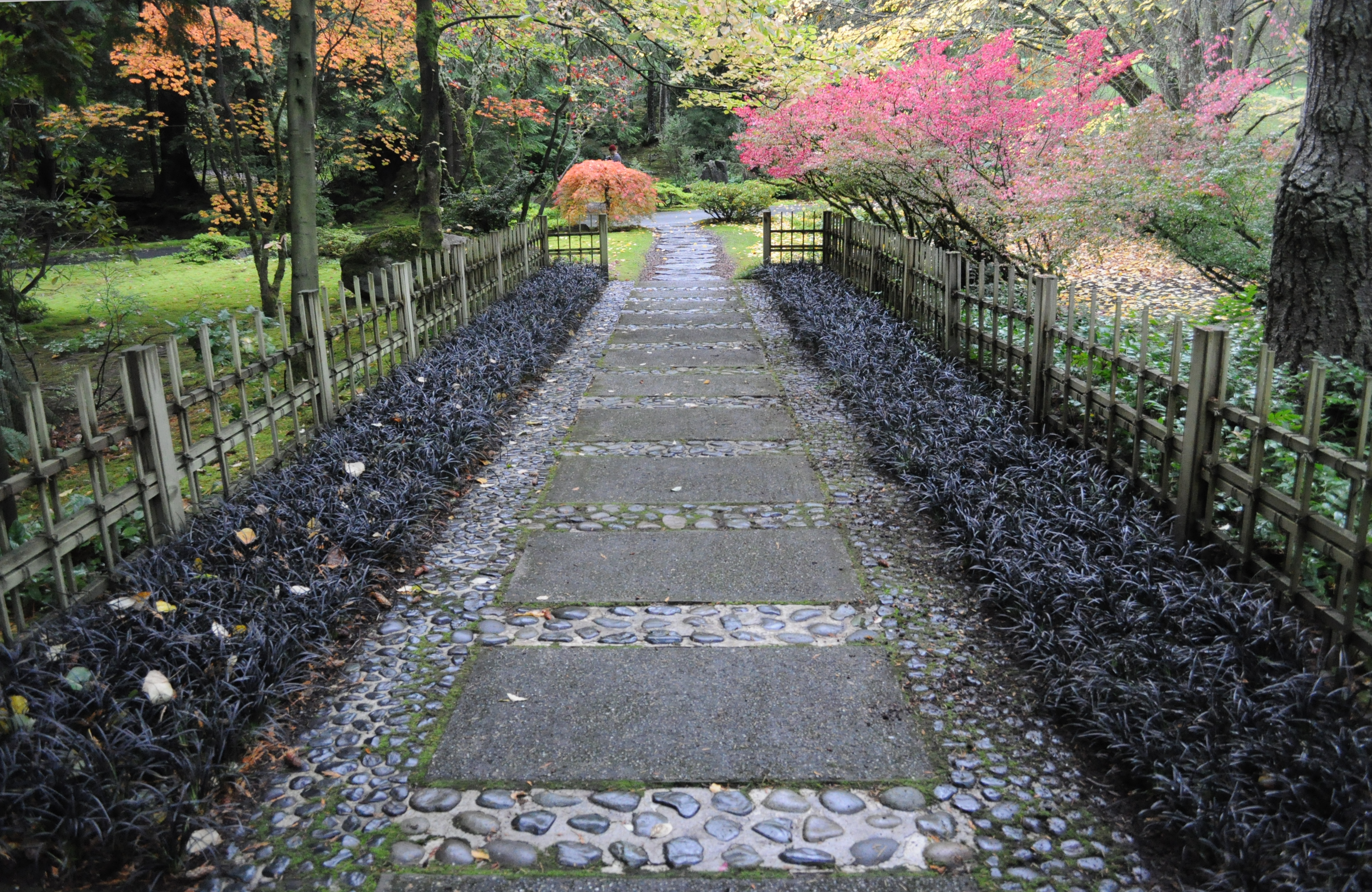
The Japanese Garden at the Bloedel Reserve

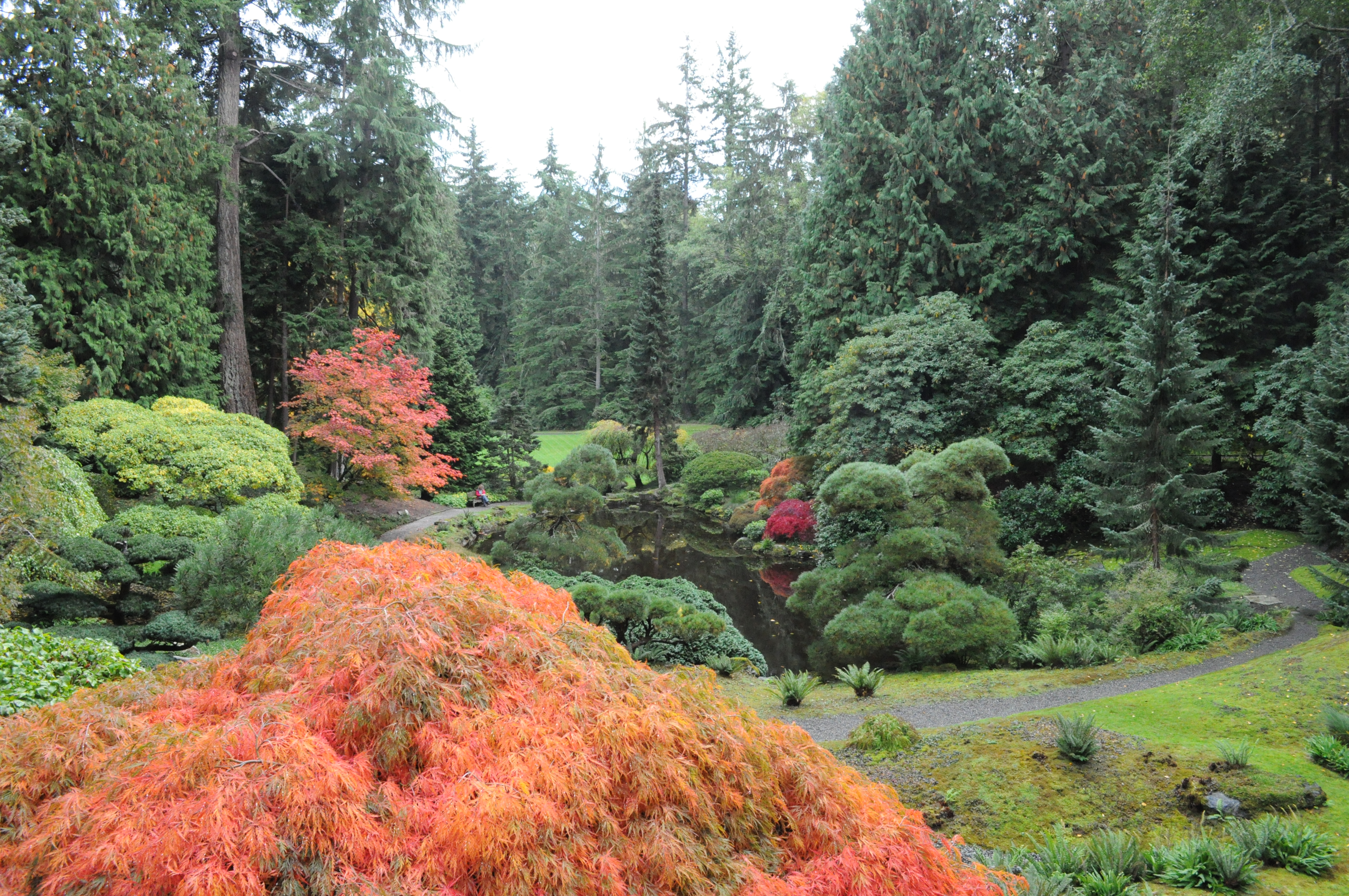
The Japanese Garden at the Bloedel Reserve

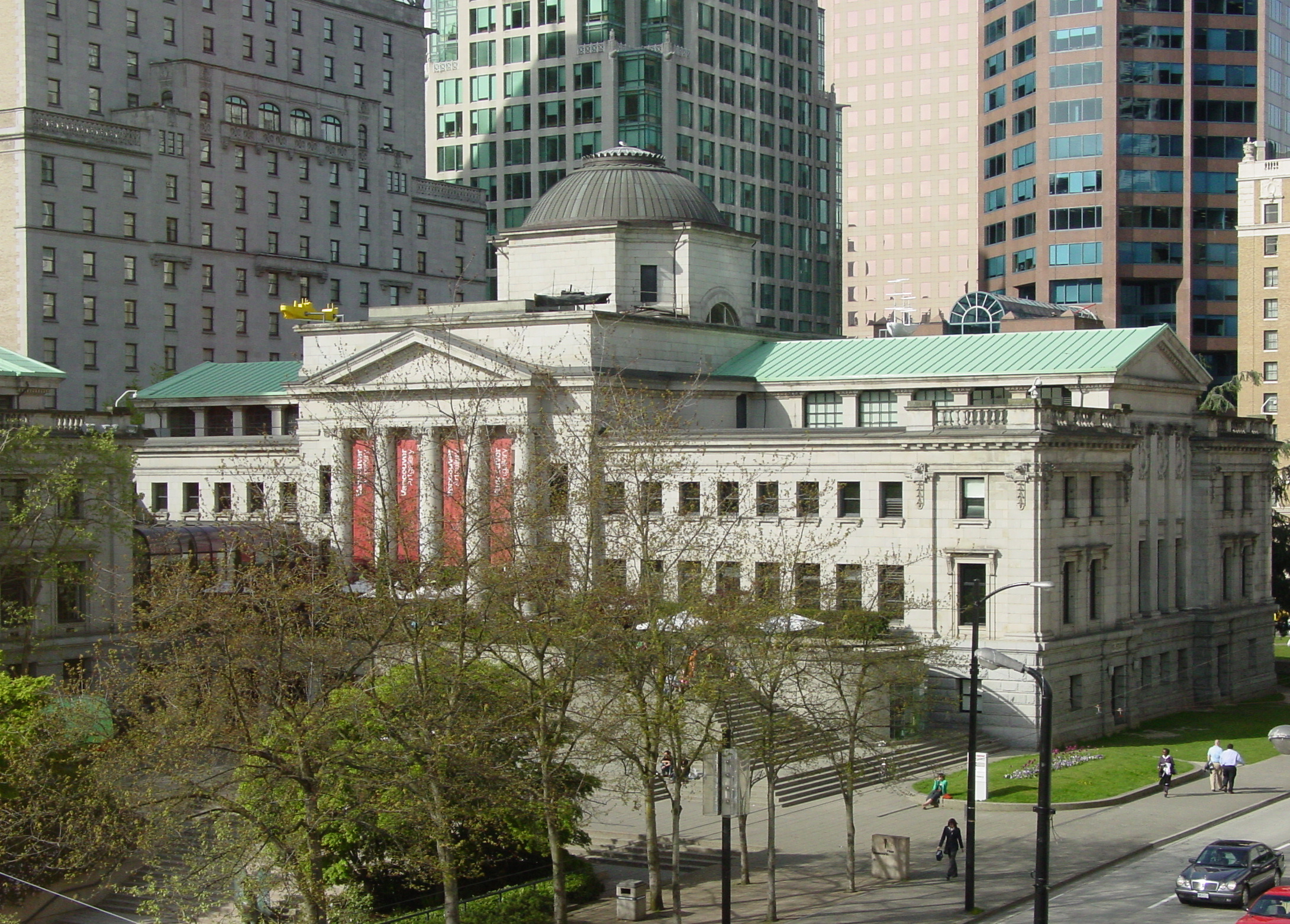
Vancouver Art Gallery

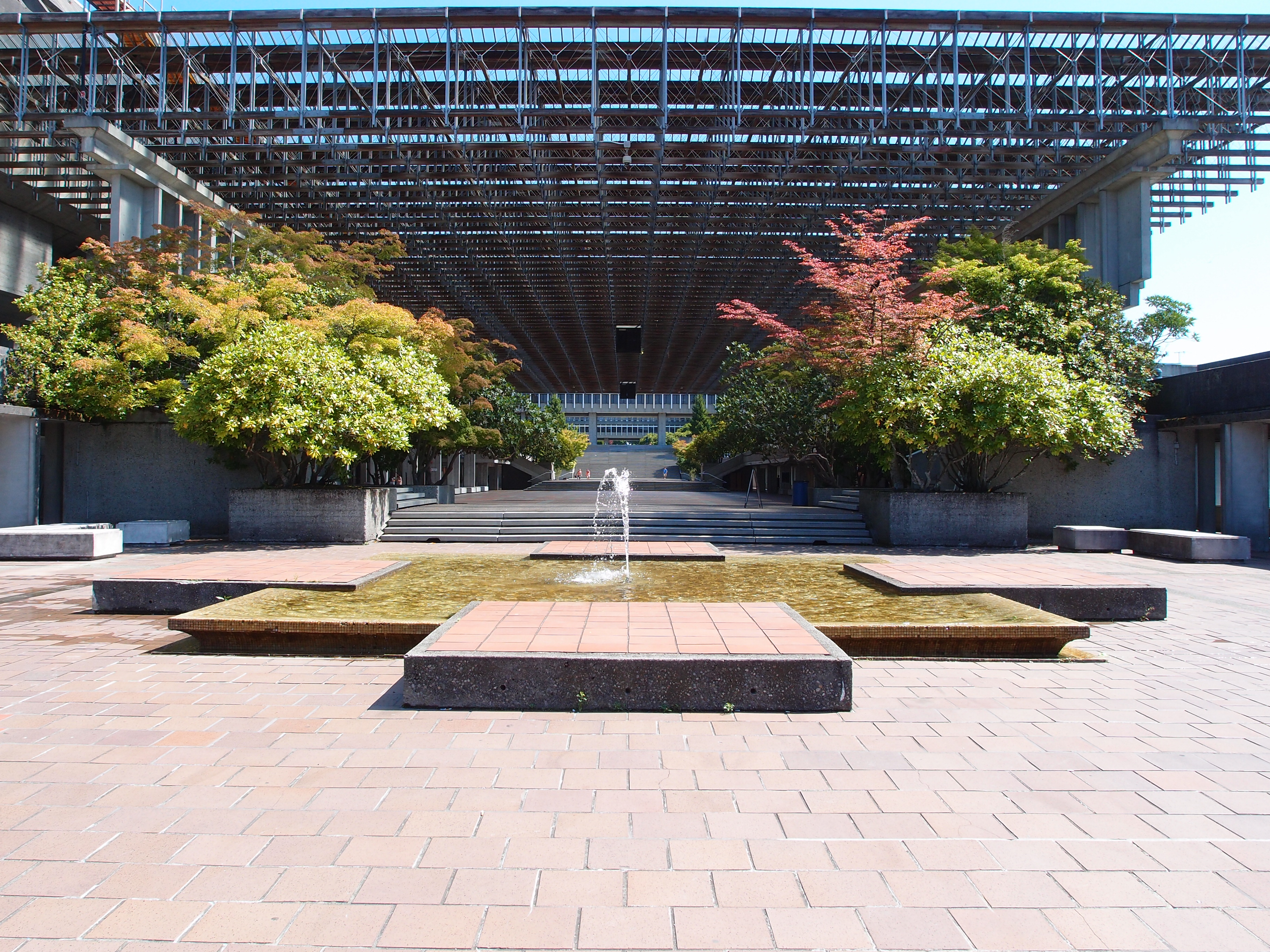
Simon Fraser University Mall

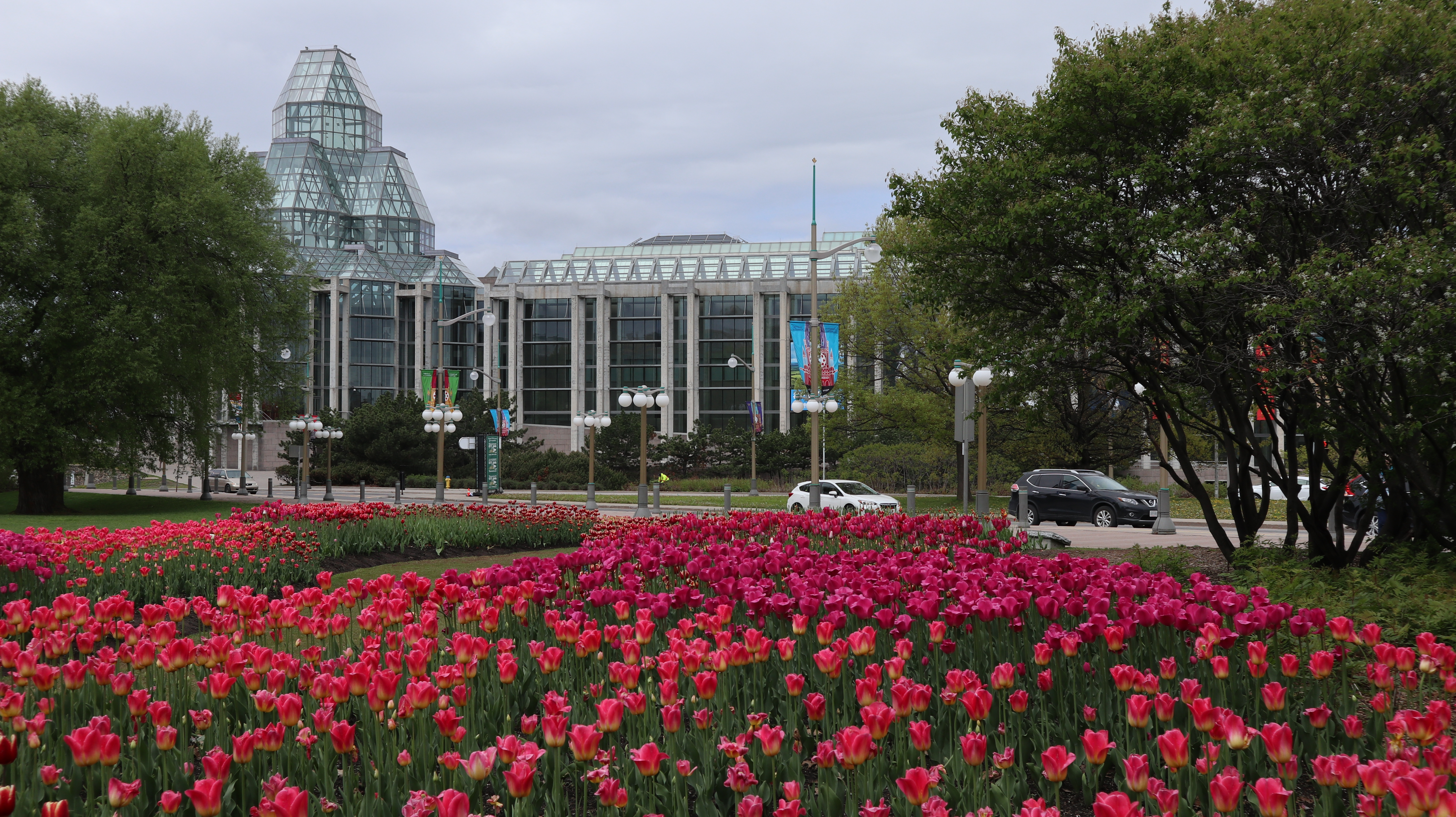
The National Gallery of Canada

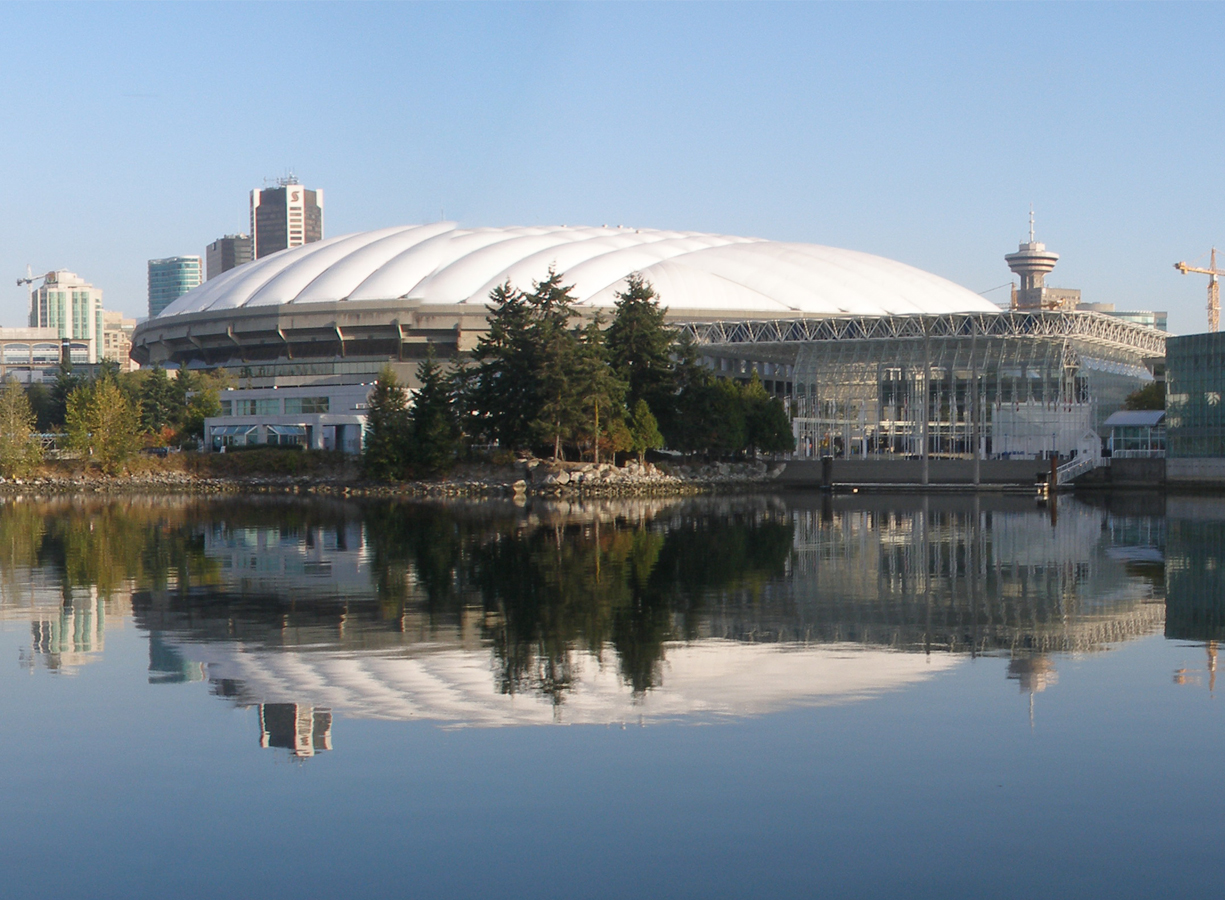
BC Place

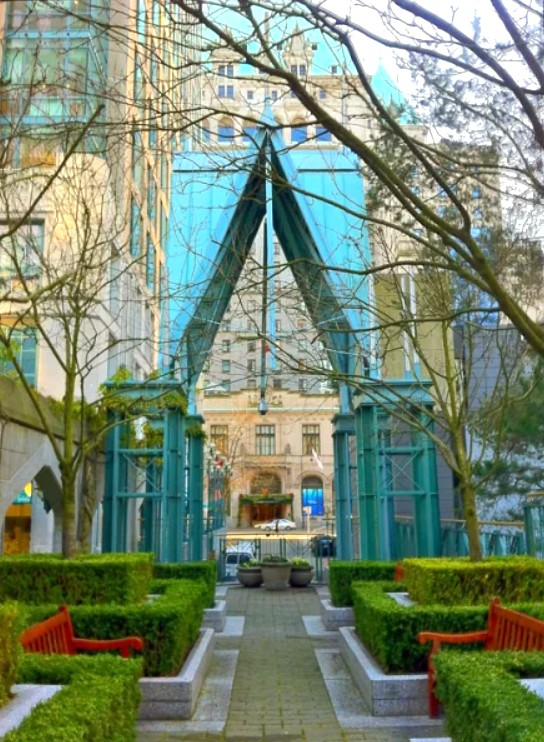
Cathedral Place Courtyard

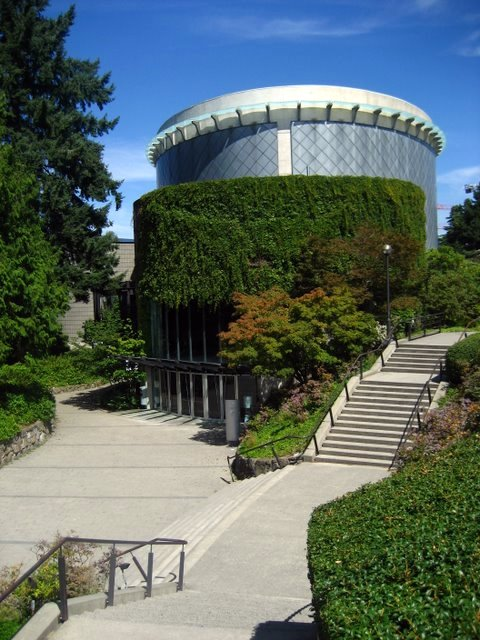
The Chan Centre for the Performing Arts

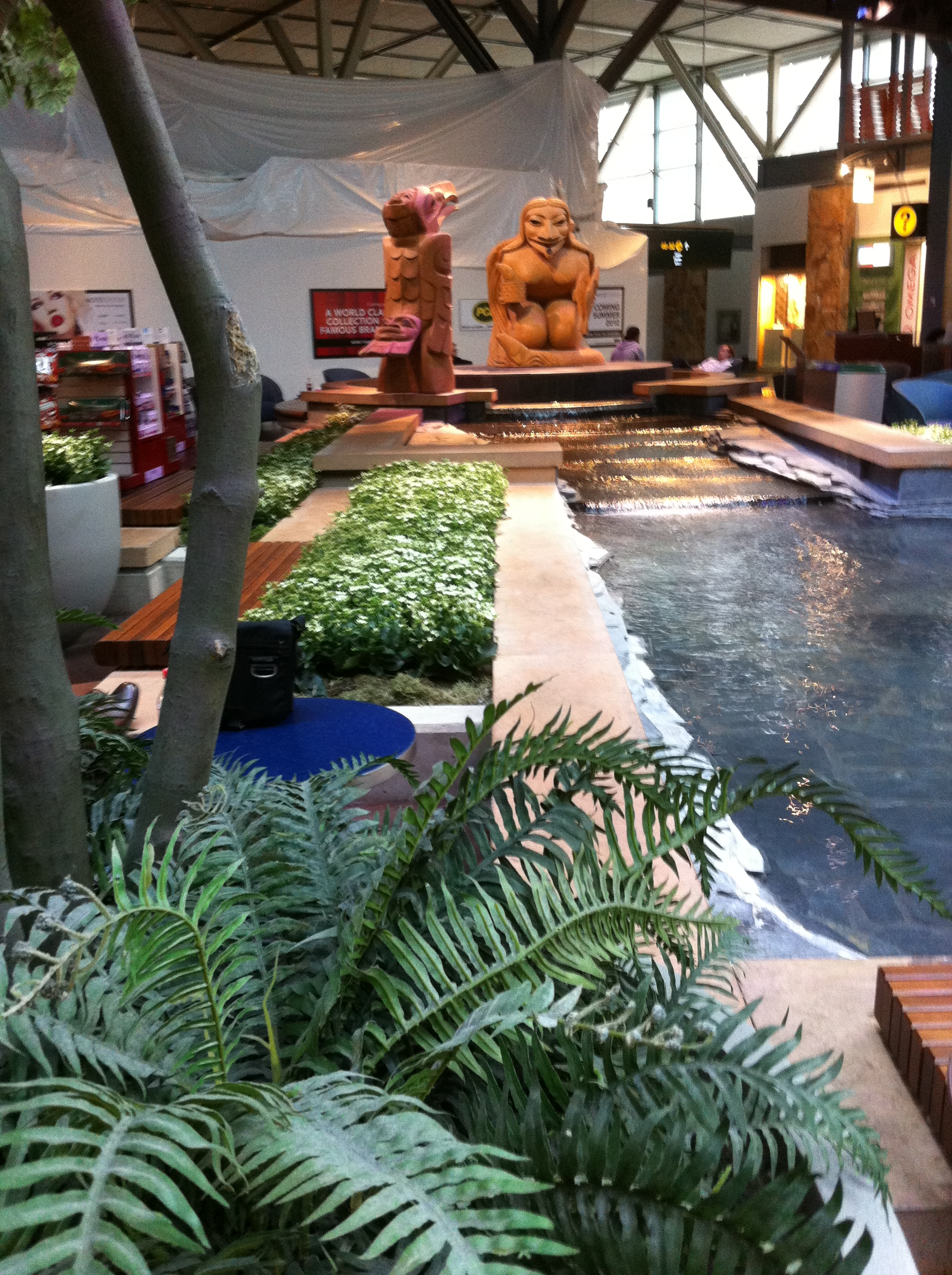
Vancouver International Airport Interior Detail

== Sources ==
- Susan Herrington. Cornelia Hahn Oberlander: Making the Modern Landscape. Charlottesville: University of Virginia Press, 2014. ISBN 978-0-81393-459-4
- Charles A. Birnbaum and Stephanie S. Foell. Shaping the American Landscape: New Profiles from the Pioneers of American Landscape Design Project. Charlottesville: University of Virginia Press, 2009. ISBN 978-0-81392-789-3.
- Kathy Stinson. Love Every Leaf: The Life of Landscape Architect Cornelia Hahn Oberlander. Toronto: Tundra, 2008. ISBN 978-0-88776-804-0
- Mechtild Manus, Lisa Rochon. Picturing Landscape Architecture: Projects of Cornelia Hahn Oberlander as seen by Etta Gerdes. Munich: Callwey / Montreal: Goethe-Institute, 2006 ISBN 3-7667-1669-7
- Oberlander at The Canadian Encyclopedia, 2020
- Katharine Hamer, "A home fit for King David: Architects created a space tailored to Jewish independent school", Jewish Independent, 17 February 2006
- Cornelia Oberlander to present new park design 1 April, City of Toronto, 21 March 2003.
- Waterfall Building Green Roof Case Study, Canada Mortgage and Housing Corporation, January 2002 (pdf)
- Web Atlas Featured Projects | BCSLA British Columbia Society of Landscape Architects new link to BCSLA Web Atlas October 2013
- Library Square Building aerial view
- Charles Birnbaum "Oral history of Cornelia Hahn Oberlander" on 3-5 August 2008, Cultural History Project
- |title=TCLF Announces Oberlander Prize
- Vancouver Heritage
- (in German) Mehr Grün in die Innenstadt. Hahn Oberlander visiting the town of her childhood, 2012. Westdeutsche Allgemeine Zeitung, Der Westen, 12 August 2012, by Margitta Ulbricht
- Hine, Ron (19 March 2013). "William H. Whyte on what makes public spaces fail & what makes them succeed" (PDF).
- Brown, Patricia Leigh (2 October 2019). "Landscape Prize Honors Cornelia Hahn Oberlander". The New York Times – via NYTimes.com.
