= Elisabeth Jastrow =

German-born American classical archaeologist, professor

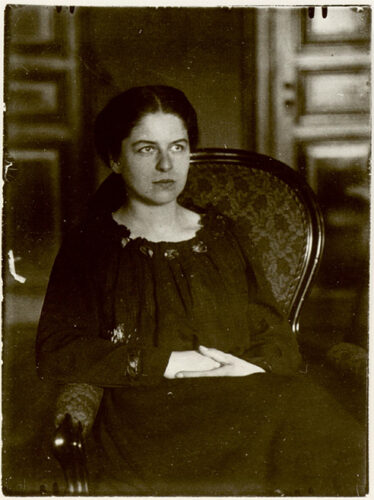
Image of Elisabeth Jastrow

Elisabeth Jastrow (October 7, 1890 – September 1981) was a German-born American classical archaeologist. Her research focus included arulae (small altars).

== Early life and education ==
Elisabeth Anna Marie Jastrow (nickname, "Ebit" or "Ebith") was born October 7, 1890, in Berlin. She came from a family of assimilated German Jews. Her father was the historian and social scientist, Ignaz Jastrow. Through her father, she grew up in a world full of scholars and artists, the sister Lotte Beate Jastrow Hahn later combined education and horticulture.

Early on, Jastrow became interested in the ancient world and in 1909, began studying classical philology, archaeology, art history, and philosophy at the University of Berlin. Her most important teacher was Georg Loeschcke, after whose death in 1915, she moved to the Heidelberg University. There, Friedrich von Duhn became her doctoral supervisor. The title of the dissertation, from 1916, was Tonaltäre aus den westgriechischen Kolonien (Tonaltäre from the Western Greek colonies). At the time, she also joined a circle of archaeologists whose center was Margarete Bieber. In addition, Gerhart Rodenwaldt, Valentin Müller, Erwin Panofsky, Walther Amelung, and Bernhard Schweitzer were among them.

== Career ==
From 1916 to 1922, she worked at the archaeological seminar of the University of Heidelberg and at the University of Giessen. From 1922 to 1924, she worked for the German Archaeological Institute in Athens, from 1925 to 1929, in the Rome department. In Rome, she was involved in the creation of the catalog of the library. After returning to Berlin, she worked briefly for the headquarters of the German Archaeological Institute. After that, she worked until the beginning of 1933 at the University of Marburg. From Marburg, she was to move to Bonn, where she was to create a catalog of the vase collection at the Academic Art Museum. Before she could begin her work in May, the Law for the Restoration of the Professional Civil Service ("Law on the Restoration of the Professional Civil Service") came into force, which prohibited opportunity for advancement to her in Germany.

After being thus barred from all opportunities for scientific activity in Germany, she received a scholarship from the American Association of University Women for the year 1934/35, the A.A.U.W. International Fellowship. With it, she moved to Italy, and also traveled to Greece and the United States. During this time, she continued her studies in ancient terracotta. At the end of the scholarship, she continued her studies with support from Hetty Goldman. After the death of her father in May 1937, she returned to Germany to settle the estate. After that, it became problematic for her to leave Germany at all.

When she succeeded, she first went to Switzerland, and in October 1938, to the United States. Although Jastrow lacked the economic resources for a secure new beginning, she could rely on a broad network of connections. For example, her cousins Marcus, and his sons, Joseph and Morris, who were academics in the U.S. for some time. The circle also included her friend Margarete Bieber as well as Frank William Taussig, a friend of her father. First, she settled in the Boston area and took smaller positions as a German teacher, museum photographer, and seller of casts. Her sister, Lotte, and Lotte's two daughters, including Cornelia, also left Germany, first to England, before arriving in New York City in 1939.

From June 1939, Jastrow received recognition as an emigrant to the U.S. and a permanent residence permit, which allowed her to accept better work. She first became a leader and associate at the Museum of Fine Arts, Boston, for one year, and from 1941, she taught at the Department of Art of the Woman's College of the University of North Carolina at Greensboro. Already in the fall of the year, she was promoted to the rank of Assistant Professor at the Department of Art. She taught there all periods of art history, which was not easy for her as an archaeologist. On the one hand, Jastrow was aware of her luck to have escaped from Germany, on the other hand, she suffered from the local situation, over the lack of contact with the German academic world, the bad library, to the lack of opportunities for their own research. Because of the poor pay, she tried to balance her schedule by teaching German and English courses. Whenever possible, she left the confines of Greensboro to do research in New York City, Boston, and other places. Jastrow and her sister, Lotte, tried to rescue their mother from Germany, finally succeeding in October 1941. Anna Seligmann Jastrow lived with her daughter, Elisabeth, until Anna's death in August 1943. In December 1944, Jastrow became a U.S. citizen.

== Later years and death ==
In 1961, Jastrow retired from the university. After that, she devoted herself more intensively to her archaeological studies. In 1970, she moved to retirement home in Greensboro where she died in September 1981. Her papers are held by the Getty Research Institute in Los Angeles, California.
