= Denise Scott Brown =

American architect (born 1931)

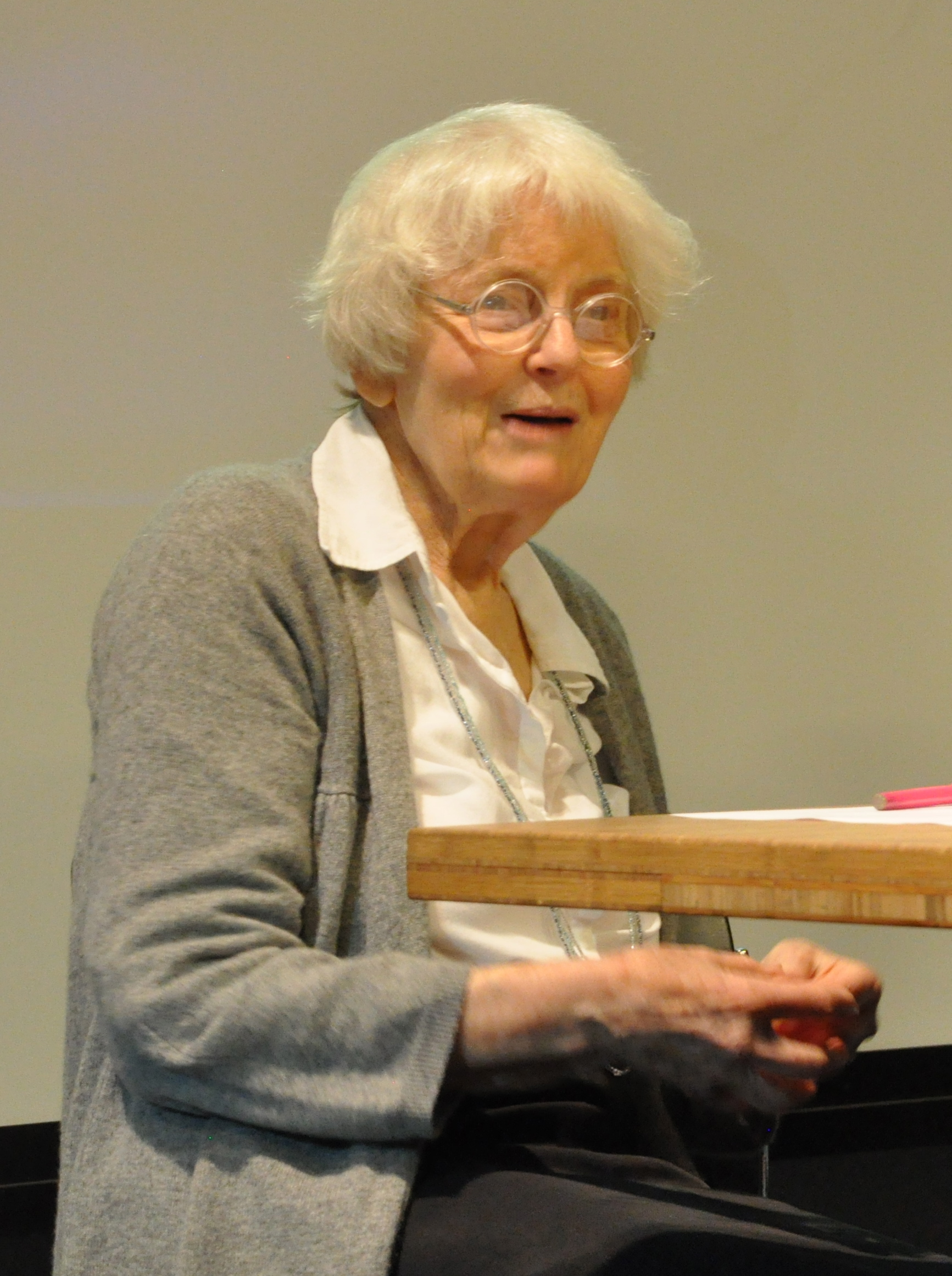
- Scott Brown in October 2012
- Born: Denise Lakofski; October 3, 1931 (age 95); Nkana, Northern Rhodesia (now Zambia)
- Education: University of the Witwatersrand; Architectural Association School of Architecture; University of Pennsylvania
- Occupation: Architect
- Spouses: Robert Scott Brown (m. 1955; died 1959) Robert Venturi (m. 1967; died 2018)
- Parent(s): Simon Lakofski; Phyllis Hepker
- Practice: Venturi, Scott Brown and Associates; Venturi and Rauch; Venturi, Rauch and Scott Brown

Denise Scott Brown (née Lakofski; born October 3, 1931) is a South African-American architect, planner, writer and educator. She is known for her contributions to architectural theory, urban design, and postmodern architecture, as well as for her joint work with her husband architect Robert Venturi.

In addition to professional practice, Scott Brown has taught at several universities, including the University of Pennsylvania, the University of California, Berkeley, UCLA, and Harvard University. Her writing and teaching have addressed urbanism, historic preservation, social equity in planning and design, and the role of gender in the architectural profession.

She has received numerous honors for her contributions to architecture and urbanism, including the Jane Drew Prize and the Soane Medal. Although her husband Venturi was awarded the Pritzker Architecture Prize in 1991, Scott Brown was not included, prompting later international advocacy for recognition of her role in their joint work. She is principal of the firm Venturi, Scott Brown and Associates in Philadelphia.

== Early life ==
Denise Scott Brown (née Lakofski) was born in 1931 in Nkana, Northern Rhodesia (now Kitwe, Zambia), to Jewish parents Simon and Phyllis Lakofski (née Hepker). Her family were immigrants from Eastern Europe: her father's family originated in Lithuania and her mother's in Latvia, having emigrated to southern Africa to escape economic hardship and pogroms in Imperial Russia. Her father was an entrepreneur from Johannesburg, South Africa, involved in trading, stockbroking, and film distribution, and her mother had grown up in rural Southern Rhodesia (now Zimbabwe).

After a childhood illness, the family relocated back to Johannesburg, where she was raised from the age of two. She grew up in a household shaped by migration and exposure to international visitors through her father's work. She grew up in a Jewish household with religious and cultural observances, while also attending English-language schools. Her childhood included periods of travel to Europe for medical treatment for a sibling, and she later recalled these early experiences of mobility, cultural diversity, and the landscapes of southern Africa as formative influences.

== Education ==
Lakofski wanted to be an architect from the time she was five years old. She attended the all-girls Kingsmead College, a liberal private school in Johannesburg known for its opposition to some racial restrictions of the period in South Africa.

She spent her summers working with architects, and from 1948 to 1952 studied architecture at the University of the Witwatersrand. While a student she participated in archaeological field expeditions in rural areas of South Africa. At Witwatersrand she met fellow architecture student Robert Scott Brown. The two became collaborators on student projects and developed a personal relationship. She briefly entered liberal politics but became frustrated by the lack of acceptance of women in the field.

Lakofski moved from South Africa to London in 1952, where she worked for the modernist architect Frederick Gibberd. She continued her education after winning admission to the Architectural Association School of Architecture, where she was joined by Robert Scott Brown, and graduated with a degree in architecture in 1955.

Denise Lakofski and Robert Scott Brown were married on July 21, 1955. The couple spent the next three years working and traveling throughout Europe, including a study trip to Italy planned by their friend, the architectural historian Robin Middleton with whom they had studied in South Africa and met up with again in London.

In 1958, they moved to Philadelphia to study at the University of Pennsylvania's planning department. The following year, in 1959, Robert died in a car accident. Scott Brown completed her master's degree in city planning in 1960 and, upon graduation, became a faculty member at the university.

== Career ==
=== Academia ===
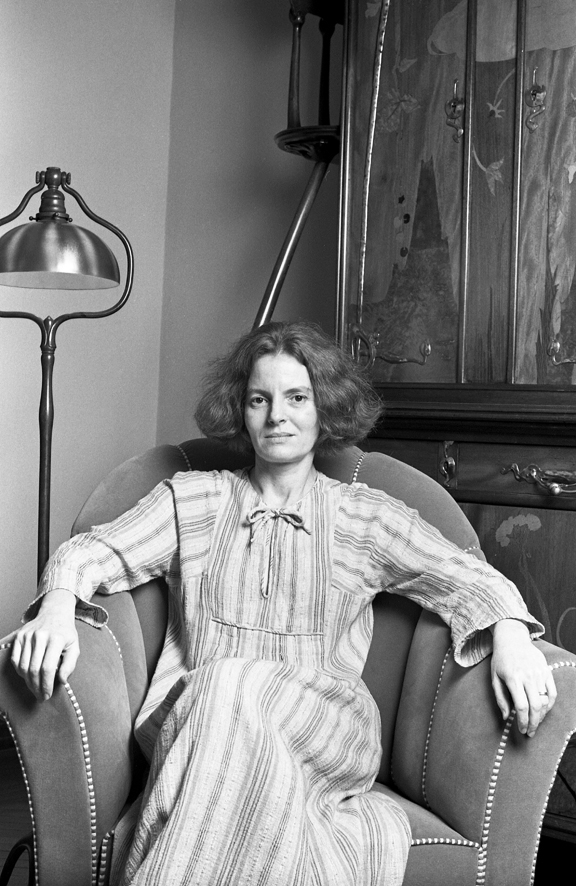
Scott Brown in 1978

While teaching, she completed a master's degree in architecture. At a 1960 faculty meeting, she argued against demolishing the university's library, now the Fisher Fine Arts Library, designed by Philadelphia architect Frank Furness. At the meeting, she met Robert Venturi, a young architect and fellow professor. The two became collaborators and taught courses together from 1962 to 1964. Scott Brown left the University of Pennsylvania in 1965. Becoming a scholar in urban planning, she taught at the University of California, Berkeley, and was then named co-chair of the Urban Design Program at the University of California, Los Angeles. During her years in the Southwest, Scott Brown became interested in the newer cities of Los Angeles and Las Vegas. She invited Venturi to visit her classes at UCLA, and in 1966 asked him to visit Las Vegas with her. The two were married in Santa Monica, California, on July 23, 1967. Scott Brown moved back to Philadelphia in 1967 to join Robert Venturi's firm, Venturi and Rauch, and became principal in charge of planning in 1969.

Scott Brown later taught at Yale University, where she developed courses that encouraged architects to study problems in the built environment employing both traditional empirical methods of social science but also media studies and pop culture. In 2003 she was a visiting lecturer with Venturi at Harvard University's Graduate School of Design.

In 1972, with Venturi and Steven Izenour, Scott Brown wrote Learning From Las Vegas: the Forgotten Symbolism of Architectural Form. The book published studies of the Las Vegas Strip, undertaken with students in an architectural research studio course which Scott Brown taught with Venturi in 1970 at Yale's School of Architecture and Planning. The book coined the terms "Duck" and "Decorated Shed" as applied to opposing architectural styles. Scott Brown has remained a writer on architecture and urban planning. The book joined Venturi's previous Complexity and Contradiction in Architecture (Museum of Modern Art, 1966) as a rebuke to orthodox modernism and elite architectural tastes, and a pointed acceptance of American sprawl and vernacular architecture.

Scott Brown and Venturi strove for understanding the city in terms of social, economic and cultural perspectives, viewing it as a set of complex systems upon planning. As part of their design process, the Venturi, Scott Brown & Associates firm studies the trends of an area, marking future expansions or congestions. These studies influence plans and design makeup. Such an approach was used for their Berlin Tomorrow Competition, putting the population movement and daily pattern in consideration. Similarly, the Bryn Mawr College plan took into consideration the landmark of the early campus and the usages of campus space prior to planning. Scott Brown holds a systematic approach to planning in what is coined as "FFF studios." In it, form, forces and function determine and help define the urban environment. For example, the Venturi, Scott Brown & Associates firm studied both the expansion of Dartmouth College campus along with the wilderness surrounding the perimeter of the area.

The fusion of Eastern and Western ideas in the Nikko hotel chain are evident by merging the Western notion of comfort (62 Stanislaus Von Moos) with historical kimono patterns with their hidden order. The architecture applies a post-Las Vegas modern feel while projecting the traditional Japanese shopping street. Guest rooms are typically made with Western taste, with fabrics, wallpaper, and carpet exclusively from the Venturi, Scott Brown & Associates firm that reflect the scenery outside. In contrast, the exterior "street" complex reflects Japanese urban and traditional life.

With the firm, renamed Venturi, Rauch and Scott Brown in 1980, and finally Venturi, Scott Brown and Associates in 1989, Scott Brown has led civic planning projects and studies, and more recently has directed university campus planning projects. By the beginning of the 1980s, critics characterized them as the most influential and visionary architects of the time and continued their path with a clear approach, with their radical theories of design. She has also served as principal-in-charge with Robert Venturi on the firm's larger architectural projects, including the Sainsbury Wing of London's National Gallery, the seat of the departmental council in Toulouse and the Nikko Hotel and Spa Resort in Japan.

== Pritzker Prize controversy ==
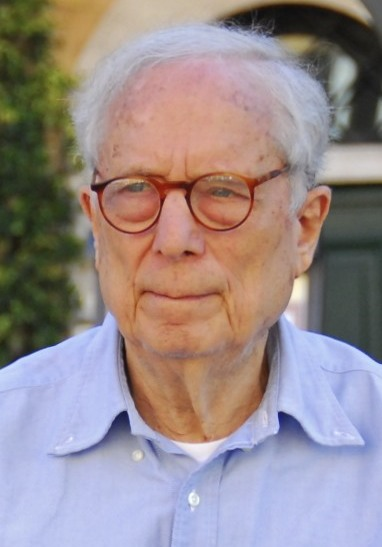
Scott Brown's husband and business partner Robert Venturi

External videos
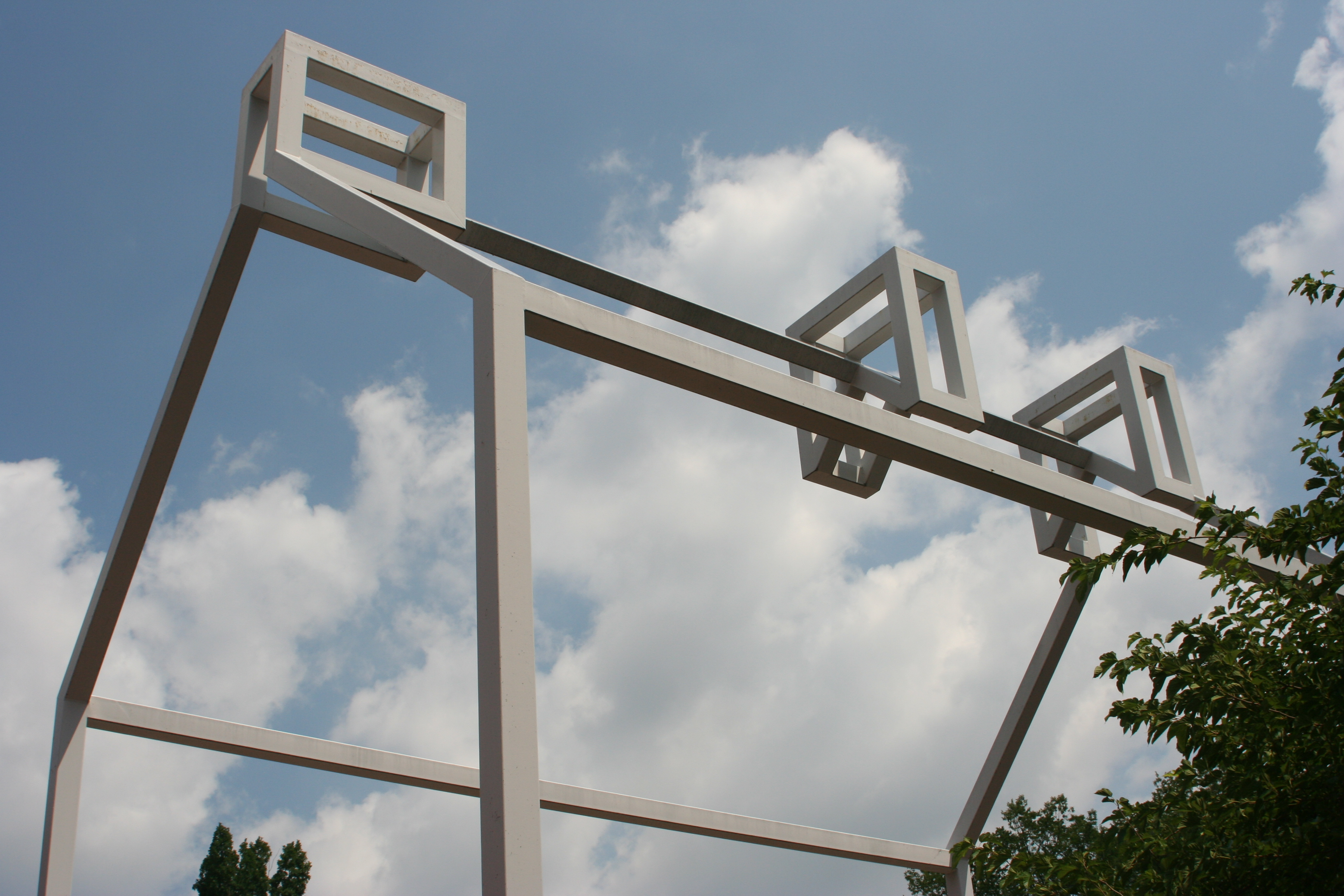
- 2016 AIA Gold Medal: Denise Scott Brown, Hon. FAIA and Robert Venturi, FAIA on YouTube, 3:50

When Robert Venturi was named as winner of the 1991 Pritzker Architecture Prize, Scott Brown did not attend the award ceremony in protest. The prize organization, the Hyatt Foundation, stated that, in 1991, it honored only individual architects, a practice that changed in 2001 with the selection of Jacques Herzog and Pierre de Meuron. However, the award was given to two recipients in 1988.

In 2013, Women In Design, a student organization spearheaded by Caroline Amory James and Arielle Assouline-Lichten at the Harvard Graduate School of Design started a petition for Scott Brown to receive joint recognition with her partner Robert Venturi. When awarded the Jane Drew Prize in 2017, Scott Brown referred to the Pritzker controversy and subsequent petition saying "I was very touched by the Pritzker petition – and that is my prize in the end. 20,000 people wrote from all over the world and every one of them called me Denise."

== Learning From Pop ==
In 1973, Denise Scott Brown wrote her essay "Learning From Pop", where she emphasized the importance of taking pop-culture into consideration when designing architecture. This brought a symbolic element into architecture, with the use of time and the zeitgeist of the post-modern era, including the use of color and signage in architecture. This was very similar to "Learning From Las Vegas" written by Scott Brown, Venturi, and Izenou in 1972.

== Room at the top ==
In 1989, Scott Brown published her famous essay, "Room at the Top? Sexism and the Star System in Architecture". Although Scott Brown wrote the essay in 1975, she decided not to publish it at the time, out of fear for damaging her career. The essay describes her struggle to be recognized as an equal partner of the firm, in an architecture world that was predominantly male. She has since been an advocate for Women in Architecture and has spoken out about discrimination within the profession on several accounts.

== Architecture projects ==
- Undergraduate Science Building, Life Sciences Institute and Palmer Commons complex University of Michigan; Ann Arbor, Michigan (2005)
- Brown University Campus Life Plan; Providence, Rhode Island (2004)
- Tsinghua University Campus Plan Suggestions; Beijing, China (2004)
- Baker-Berry Library, Dartmouth College; Hanover, New Hampshire (2002)
- Radcliffe Institute for Advanced Study at Harvard University Campus Plan; Boston, Massachusetts (2002)
- Williams College Campus Plan; Williamstown, Massachusetts (2001)
- Frist Campus Center, Princeton University; New Jersey (2000)
- Rauner Special Collections Library, Dartmouth College; Hanover, New Hampshire (2000)
- Perelman Quadrangle, University of Pennsylvania; Philadelphia (2000)
- Seat of the departmental council; Toulouse, France (1999)
- Gonda (Goldschmied) Neurosciences and Genetics Research Center, UCLA; Los Angeles, California (1998)
- University of Michigan Campus Plan; Ann Arbor, Michigan (1997–2005)
- Bryn Mawr College Campus Plan; Bryn Mawr, Pennsylvania (1997)
- Mielparque Nikko Kirifuri Resort; Nikko National Park, Japan (1997)
- Museum of Contemporary Art, San Diego; La Jolla, California (1996)
- Denver Civic Center Plan; Denver, Colorado (1995)
- Charles P. Stevenson, Jr. Library, Bard College; Annandale-on-Hudson, New York (1994)
- Children's Museum; Houston, Texas (1992)
- Sainsbury Wing, National Gallery, London; United Kingdom (1991)
- Seattle Art Museum; Seattle, Washington (1991)
- Restoration of the Fisher Fine Arts Library, University of Pennsylvania; Philadelphia (1991)
- University of Pennsylvania Campus Planning; Philadelphia (1988–2000)
- Center City Development Plan; Memphis, Tennessee (1987)
- Lewis Thomas Laboratory; Princeton University, New Jersey (1986)
- Gordon Wu Hall; Princeton University, New Jersey (1983)
- Hennepin Avenue Transit/Entertainment Study; Minneapolis, Minnesota (1981)
- Jim Thorpe Historic District Planning Study; Jim Thorpe, Pennsylvania (1979)
- Washington Avenue Revitalization Plan; Miami Beach, Florida (1978)
- Best Products Catalog Showroom; Langhorne, Pennsylvania, (1978)
- Allen Memorial Art Museum, Oberlin College; Oberlin, Ohio (1976)
- Basco Showroom; Philadelphia (1976)
- Franklin Court; Philadelphia (1976)
- South Street "Crosstown Community" Planning; Philadelphia (1970)
- Shanghai High-rise skyscraper office towers; Shanghai, China (2003)
- U.S. Embassy Competition for U.S. Embassy in Berlin; Berlin (1995)

== Awards and recognition ==
- Lifetime Achievement Award at Lisbon Architecture Triennale
- Soane Medal; 2018
- Jane Drew Prize; 2017
- European Cultural Centre Architecture Award; 2016
- AIA Gold Medal; 2016 (with Robert Venturi)
- Edmund N. Bacon Prize, Philadelphia Center for Architecture; 2010
- Design Mind Award, Cooper-Hewitt National Design Awards, 2007 (with Robert Venturi)
- Athena Medal, Congress for the New Urbanism, 2007
- Vilcek Prize in Architecture, The Vilcek Foundation, 2007
- Membership, American Philosophical Society, 2006
- The Carpenters' Company Master Builder Award; 2005
- Harvard Radcliffe Institute Medal; 2005
- Visionary Woman Award, Moore College of Art & Design; 2003
- Vincent Scully Prize, National Building Museum, 2002, with Robert Venturi
- Topaz Medallion, American Institute of Architects, 1996
- National Medal of Arts, United States Presidential Award, 1992 (with Robert Venturi)
- Chicago Architecture Award, 1987
- ACSA (Association of Collegiate Schools of Architecture) Distinguished Professor Award, 1986-87
- AIA Firm Award, to Venturi, Rauch and Scott Brown; 1985

Alongside Phyllis Lambert, Blanche Lemco van Ginkel and Cornelia Oberlander, she is one of four female architects profiled in the 2018 documentary film City Dreamers.

== Published works ==
- Learning from Las Vegas: the Forgotten Symbolism of Architectural Form, (with Robert Venturi and Steven Izenour), Cambridge: MIT Press, 1972; revised edition 1977. ISBN 0-262-72006-X
- Denise Scott Brown, Learning from Pop, 1973. #WIKID
- A View from the Campidoglio: Selected Essays, 1953–1984, (with Robert Venturi), New York: Harper & Row, 1984. ISBN 0-06-438851-4
- Urban Concepts, Architectural Design Profile 60: January–February 1990. London: Academy Editions; distributed in U.S. by St. Martin's Press. ISBN 0-85670-955-7
- Denise Scott Brown, Room at the top? Sexism and the Star System in Architecture, 1989, in: RENDELL, J., PENNER, B. and BORDEN, I. (ed.): Gender Space Architecture. An Interdisciplinary Introduction, Routhledge, New York, 2000, p 258-265
- Architecture as Signs and Systems: for a Mannerist Time (with Robert Venturi), Cambridge: The Belknap Press of Harvard University Press, 2004. ISBN 0-674-01571-1
- The art in waste (article), In:Distoriones urbanas / Urban Distorisions, Madrid: Basurama, 2006. ISBN 978-84-95321-85-5
- On Public Interior Space (with Maurice Harteveld), In: AA Files 56, London: Architectural Association Publications, 2007.
- Denise Scott Brown, Having Words (London: Architectural Association, 2009)
- Miranda, Carolina A. (April 15, 2013). "Architect Interview With Denise Scott Brown". Architect. ISSN 0746-0554. OCLC 779661406.

== Bibliography ==
- Brown, Lori A. "Denise Scott Brown (née Lakofski) (b. 1931)." In The Bloomsbury Global Encyclopedia of Women in Architecture 1960-2020, edited by Lori A. Brown and Karen Burns . London: Bloomsbury, 2025. Accessed March 31, 2026. http://dx.doi.org/10.5040/9781350059733.547.
- Fixsen, Anna. "The World, as Seen by Denise Scott Brown: A Photography Exhibition on View at the Venice Architecture Biennale Chronicles the Architect's Fascination with Capturing the Beauty and Banality of Cities". Architectural Record, no. 9 (September 1, 2016): 53–54.
- Zeiger, Mimi. 2017. "Denise Scott Brown". Architectural Review 241 (1439): 67–69.
- Frida Grahn (ed.). Denise Scott Brown. In Other Eyes: Portraits of an Architect. Bauverlag, Gütersloh, Berlin / Birkhäuser, Basel 2022 (Bauwelt Fundamente; 176), ISBN 978-3-0356-2624-7.
