= Van Ginkel Footbridge =

Footbridge in St. John's, Newfoundland and Labrador, Canada

The Van Ginkel Footbridge is a heritage-designated cantilever pedestrian bridge, located in Bowring Park, St. John's, Newfoundland and Labrador. Architects Sandy Van Ginkel and Blanche Lemco van Ginkel, recognized for combining urban planning with architectural skills, were commissioned in 1958 to design the footbridge.

== Architect ==
Blanche Lemco Van Ginkel resonates as a leading figure in modern architecture since first graduating from McGill's school in 1945. She was one of the first women to be admitted into architecture school at McGill and first woman to be elected officer in 1972 and then fellow of the RAIC in 1973. After her graduation, her career began to develop swiftly, and she was given many opportunities to grow her professional experience. Van Ginkel moved to Europe to work under Le Corbusier and eventually moved back to Montreal bringing an interpretation of modernism learned from the modern masters of the twentieth century. Lemco Van Ginkel taught at numerous universities, and she was a professor at the University of Toronto from 1977 until 1982 and served as Dean of the Faculty of Architecture and Landscape Architecture from 1980 to 1982. She is a fellow of the Royal Architectural Institute of Canada, an honorary Fellow of the American Institute of Architects, and a founding member of the Board of Advisors for the International Archive of Women in Architecture at Virginia Tech.

== Architectural description ==
External image
- Photo of the Van Ginkel Footbridge.

The bridge follows modernist design concepts including the relationship of form and function and the use of new construction technology. It represents a modern addition to an Edwardian park landscape, with the aim of creating spaces for activity and repose. Also evident is the Van Ginkels' consciousness of contemporary circumstances while maintaining protection of the pedestrians.

The bridge is made of reinforced concrete, the entire load being carried on a single support. The long bridging section is hinged at its extremity and counter-balanced by the lower section. The lower section, including the steps, is cantilevered and does not touch the ground.The rough finish of the concrete has been retained, and the railings are of bronze with a wood hand rail.

== Design history ==
The Van Ginkel Footbridge is located within Bowring Park, the City of St. John's largest municipal park. The Park was established in 1914 by the Bowring Brothers and presented to the City in 1924.

According to The Daily News from December 18, 1958, a report commissioned by the City of St. John's on the future of the park notes that the park had "unlimited possibilities for becoming one of the most beautiful parks in Canada". It underwent redevelopment and expansion in the 1950s.

In 1958, the City commissioned the highly recommended Montreal architect firm, Van Ginkel Associates, to work on a new development plan that included active and passive uses with new amenities such as: a swimming pool, boating pond, playground, tennis courts, pedestrian bridge and road bridge.

Van Ginkel Associates were invited by Joey Smallwood, Newfoundland's premier from 1949-1972, to work on two planning projects in Newfoundland. Blanche notes:

"Smallwood was full of development ideas. I do remember that once he found me, to my great surprise, when I was briefly visiting Winnipeg, to offer us a project – and I think that it was about Fermeuse – or perhaps it was about the St. John's satellite..."

As funding became available from the Canadian National Railway (CNR), Van Ginkel Associates, along with the structural engineering consultant Ove Arup, designed and constructed the pedestrian and road bridges to cross the railroad tracks running south of the park. Blanche Lemco Van Ginkel had worked with Ove Arup on other projects and Van Ginkel Associates had recommended Arup to the City of St. John's.

Van Ginkel's view toward long-term goals of renewability and sustainability and the hopes of returning humanity to the human body's interaction within the urban landscape is reflected in her design of the Bowring Park footbridge in St. John's, Newfoundland and Labrador.

The Van Ginkel's did not apply any particular theories to the design of Bowing Park. Theories of their own can be seen through the introduction of urbanicity to the park. Blanche had also previously developed her own modernist theories of urban aesthetics while working with the Team Ten.

Tenders for construction were published in August of 1960. The contract was given to McNamara Construction of Newfoundland Limited and work was underway by the end of 1960. The bridge was completed in 1962 and Blanche was awarded the Massey Medal for the bridge’s design in 1964. Original drawings refer to the structure simply as "Footbridge"; later researchers such as Mellin and Richter refer to it as the "Van Ginkel Footbridge."

== Designation and conservation ==
Forty years after its construction, the bridge's form remained with some of the detailing lost. The original hand railing was made of teak; this was vandalized and the bridge fell into disrepair.

In 2005, the City of St. John's and the Bowring Park Foundation released a new master plan, which noted the importance of the footbridge and other bridges in the park:

Maintenance of the existing and additional bridges will play an important part in the continued development of the park. The many bridges now in the park demonstrate a variety of approaches to construction - from the very modern to the deliberately quaint. This diversity of forms and materials should be continued. Future development of the park should continue to create notable and well-designed bridge structures.

By 2017, the base of the bridge was covered in graffiti and was partially hidden by trees, with the entrance to the bridge from the Bowring Park side consumed by landscaped bushes, hiding aspects of the bridge such as the base and the floating effect of the stairs. Architect Robert Mellin states:

"its elegance endures, and it conveys the impression that it has always been there, especially now that the surrounding landscape has matured. But over time it has receded in prominence in the park, and today there is little awareness of its distinguished design history."

In October of 2017, Deputy Mayor Sheilagh O'Leary and Councillor Jamie Korab said they were interested in some kind of acknowledgement of the bridge's history. In November, it was announced that engineering students from Memorial University would research and do a structural analysis on the bridge.

In November, 2019, the city's built heritage experts panel recommended heritage designation of the bridge that the city recognize van Ginkel Associates in the statement of significance for their contributions to developing the bridge. In February, 2020, O'Leary spoke again on the historical importance of the structure, recommending designation and suggesting some kind of partnership with Arup Group:

I've been trying to get it bumped up on the priority list for our rehabilitation for bridges, but unfortunately it's low on the priority list. But it has such incredible heritage significance, and it's really a beautiful thing, and I think that as an asset we really need to figure out how to get it restored.

In April, 2020, City Council voted unanimously in favour of heritage designation. The City stated that the handrail needed to be replaced, and there were areas of concrete cracking and delamination. It was noted in that year, "While most people are unaware of the beautiful modernist structure in Bowring Park due to its overgrown site within the park, those who are aware are in awe." In April 2023, repairs to the bridge were approved by the City, to be completed that summer.
