= Phyllis Lambert =

Canadian philanthropist, member of the Bronfman family (born 1927)

Phyllis Lambert CC GOQ FRAIC FRSC RCA
- Born: Phyllis Barbara Bronfman; January 24, 1927 (age 99); Montreal, Quebec, Canada
- Spouse: Jean Lambert (m. 1949; div. 1954)
- Parent(s): Samuel Bronfman (father); Saidye Rosner Bronfman (mother)
- Relatives: Edgar Bronfman, Sr. (brother); Charles Bronfman (brother)
- Awards: Order of Canada; National Order of Quebec; Golden Lion, Venice Biennale of Architecture

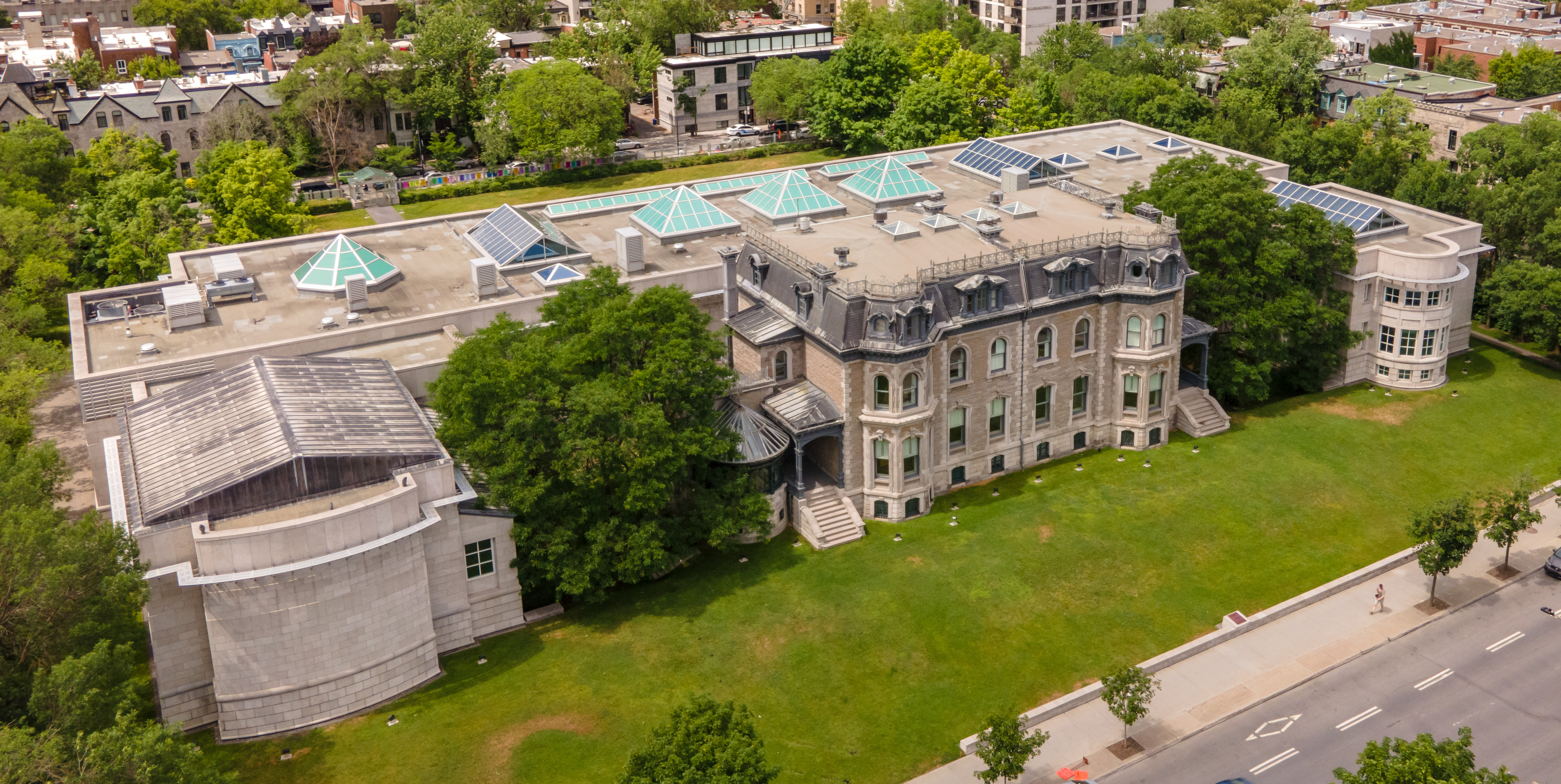
Canadian Centre for Architecture, founded by Phyllis Lambert

Phyllis Barbara Lambert CC GOQ FRAIC FRSC RCA (née Bronfman; born January 24, 1927) is a Canadian architect, philanthropist, and member of the Bronfman family.

== Life ==
Born in Montreal, Quebec, she studied at The Study, a premier independent school for girls, and was educated at the liberal arts Vassar College (A.B. in 1948). At the age of nine she was already committed to sculpture and her drawing skills were commented upon as remarkable early on in life. And at eleven she began exhibiting in annual juried exhibitions at the Royal Academy of Arts and the Société des Sculpteurs du Canada. While reading architecture history in New York she became engaged with the connections of art and architecture which would last a lifetime. Her family is of Jewish background.

On 17 May 1949, in Montreal, she married Jean Lambert, a French-German economic consultant and the only son of Adolphe Lambert of Elmhurst, Queens, New York. The couple divorced in 1954. After the divorce she decided to remain in Paris, living and working alone in a studio on her art and sculpting.

In 1951 Lambert's father Samuel Bronfman established Cemp Investments, a holding company for his four children, in which Phyllis was given a 22% ownership stake. It controlled the family's distilling empire, The Seagram Company Ltd., which over time controlled billions of dollars in liquor, real estate, oil and gas, and chemical companies.

== Work ==
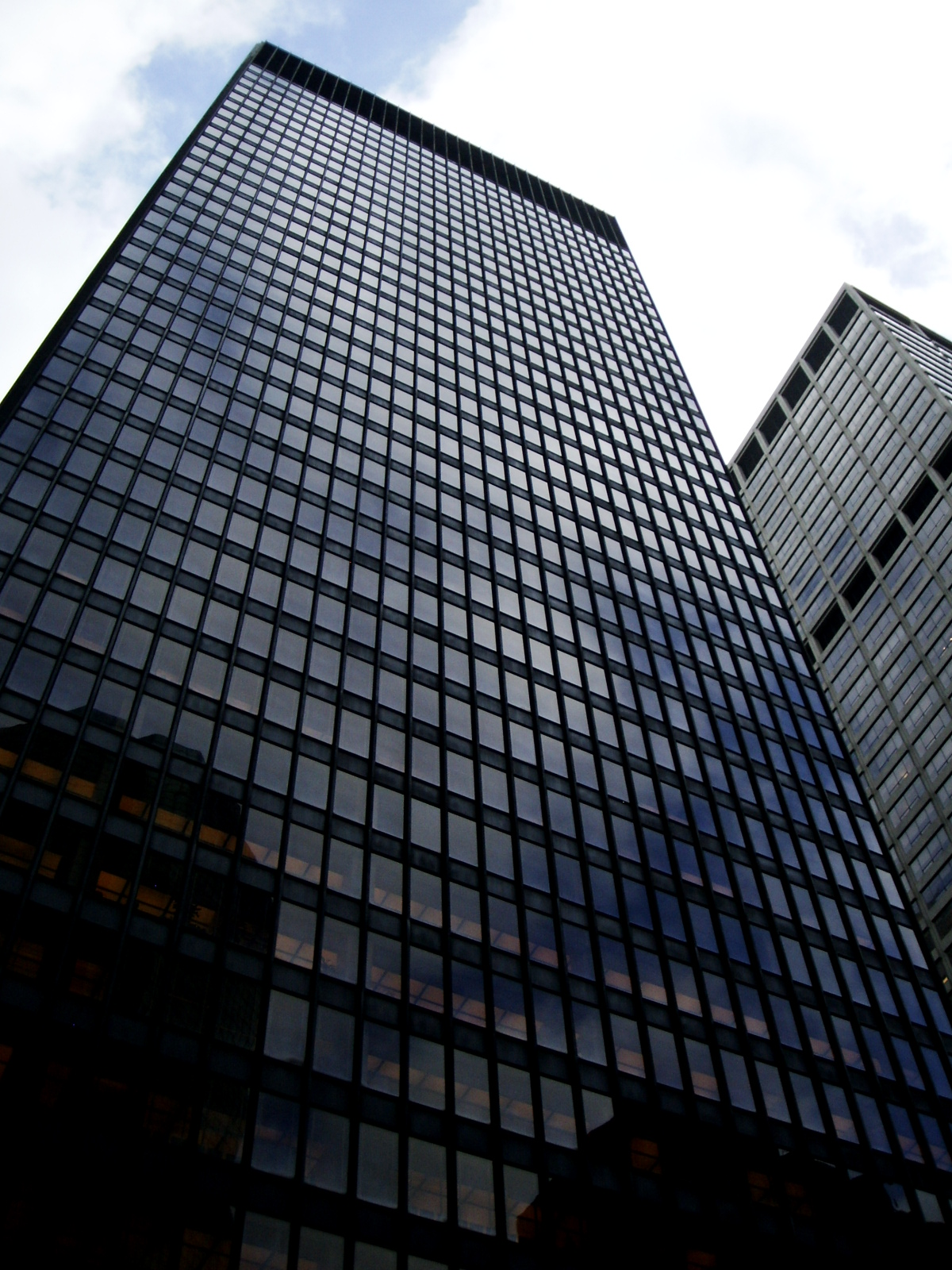
Lambert was closely involved with the design of the Seagram Building in New York.

While Lambert was living in Paris, the Seagram Company Ltd was planning a new headquarters in New York City under her father's instructions. During her time in Paris, she had come into contact with the newest artistic and architectural movements of the time. She was vehemently against the building that had already been designed for the plot by Pereira and Luckman Architects. In an eight-page letter to her father (dated June 28, 1954), the 27-year-old Phyllis managed to convince him to re-think the initial project. She was given the mandate to find a suitable alternative and after an extended research lasting six weeks Mies van der Rohe was brought forward as the new candidate. He received the project and became her mentor supporting her in her wish to become an architect. From 1954 to 1958, she was immersed in the process of designing and building the Seagram Building on Park Avenue in New York City. Though she enrolled at the Yale School of Architecture in 1958, she then changed to the Illinois Institute of Technology, which she felt better suited to what she wanted to learn.

Lambert later became the consultant to the Seagram Building, entrusted with its maintenance including the supervision and the curation of all exhibitions and collections, until 2000.

After she obtained her master's degree in 1963, her family commissioned her to design an arts centre in Montreal to be known as the Saidye Bronfman Centre, in honor of her mother. Lambert designed a ‘Miesian Structure’.

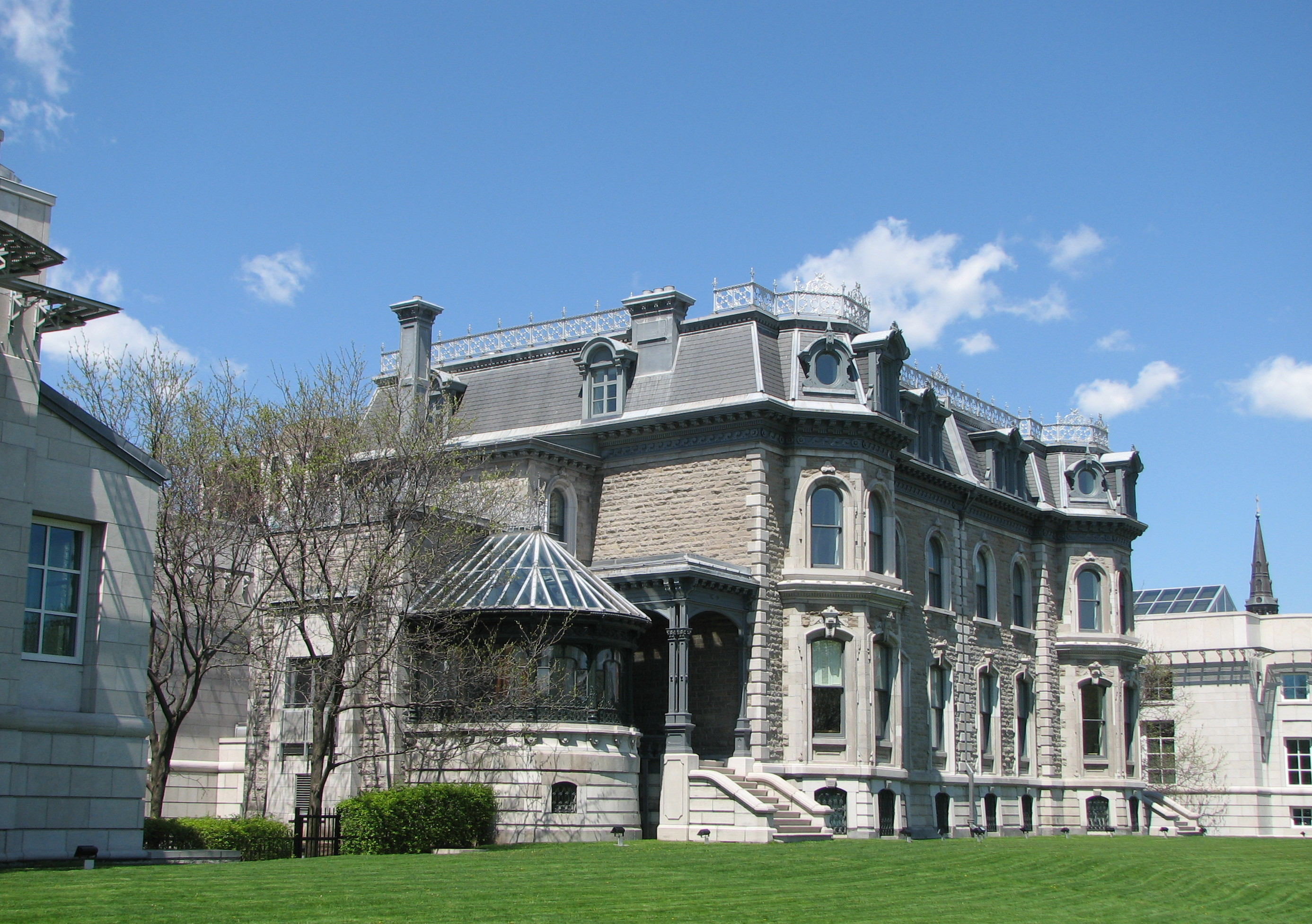
Lambert opened the Canadian Centre for Architecture in Shaughnessy Village after advocating for preserving the neighbourhood and saving the building from demolition.

After the demolition of the Van Horne Mansion on Sherbrooke Street in 1973, 23 citizen groups formed Sauvons Montréal. Lambert became one of the advocates in the efforts to revitalize the struggling Shaughnessy Village district.

In 1975, she founded the heritage preservation group Heritage Montreal. (She served as its first president until 1983.) Héritage Montréal raised funds so that conservation groups could take action. Their tools to stop demolition included marching in the streets, publishing ads and booklets and working with residents. They developed Canada's largest non-profit cooperative housing renovation, Milton-Parc.

Lambert also saved Shaughnessy House from demolition by buying it. In 1989 the 19th century mansion became part of the Canadian Centre for Architecture (CCA).

She considered an investment in renovating low-to medium-income neighbourhoods as important as the conservation of monuments or building anew. Since 1997 she held the Fonds d’investissement Montréal (FIM). It achieved in bringing private sector investment to communitarian housing beyond the limits of government programs.

In 1979, she founded the Canadian Centre for Architecture (CCA), an influential museum and research centre in Montreal's Shaughnessy Village neighbourhood, and donated 750,000 shares of Seagram to help fund the Centre. It houses extensive collections of architectural drawings, books, photographs, and archival materials. The guiding belief of the CCA is that "architecture is a public concern," and its collection and activities "are driven by a curiosity about how architecture shapes—and might reshape—contemporary life."

She served on the board of directors of Cemp's subsidiary, Cadillac Fairview for which she later picketed the offices of project developer. Again she suggested working with Mies and supported what was to be known as the Toronto-Dominion Centre.

Her work also includes serving as developer on the restoration of the Millennium Biltmore Hotel in Los Angeles by architect Gene Summers.

== National and International Recognition ==
In 1990 she received an honorary DFA in Architecture from the Pratt Institute. In 1992, she was made Officier of the Ordre des Arts et des Lettres de France. She holds honorary degrees from some 26 universities in North America and in Europe.

In 1985 she was made a Member of the Order of Canada, promoted to Officer in 1990, and promoted to Companion in 2001. In 1985, she was made a Knight of the National Order of Quebec and was promoted to Grand Officer in 2005.

Lambert was awarded the Vincent Scully Prize by the National Building Museum in 2006. Executive director Chase Rynd stated, "The Museum is honored to present its 2006 Scully Prize to Phyllis Lambert for a lifetime of outstanding achievements in the design of the built environment. From the Seagram Building to the CCA, to her work as a preservationist and educator, Phyllis Lambert has deeply enhanced the world we build for ourselves."

In 2007, Citizen Lambert: Joan of architecture, a documentary film about Lambert was directed by Teri Wehn-Damisch.

Lambert was the recipient of the Golden Lion at the 14th Venice Architecture Biennale. In 2016, she was awarded the Wolf Prize in Arts.

Alongside Blanche Lemco van Ginkel, Cornelia Oberlander and Denise Scott Brown, she is one of four prominent female architects profiled in the 2018 documentary film City Dreamers.

In 2023, Phyllis Lambert was awarded the Ada Louise Huxtable prize for her contribution to the wider architectural industry.

== Honours and awards ==
- Member of the Order of Canada (1985)
- Knight of the National Order of Quebec (1985)
- Officer of the Order of Canada (1990)
- Honorary Doctorate of Fine Arts in Architecture from Pratt Institute (1990)
- Gold Medal from the Royal Architectural Institute of Canada (1991)
- Officer of the Ordre des Arts et des Lettres (1992)
- Hadrian Award of the World Monuments Fund (1997)
- Companion of the Order of Canada (2001)
- Grand Officer of the National Order of Quebec (2005)
- Vincent Scully Prize from the National Building Museum (2006)
- Golden Lion for Lifetime Achievement from the Venice Biennale of Architecture (2014)
- Wolf Prize in Arts (2016)
