= Bowring Park (St. John's) =

Park in St. John's, Newfoundland and Labrador

Coordinates: 47°31′22″N 52°45′14″W

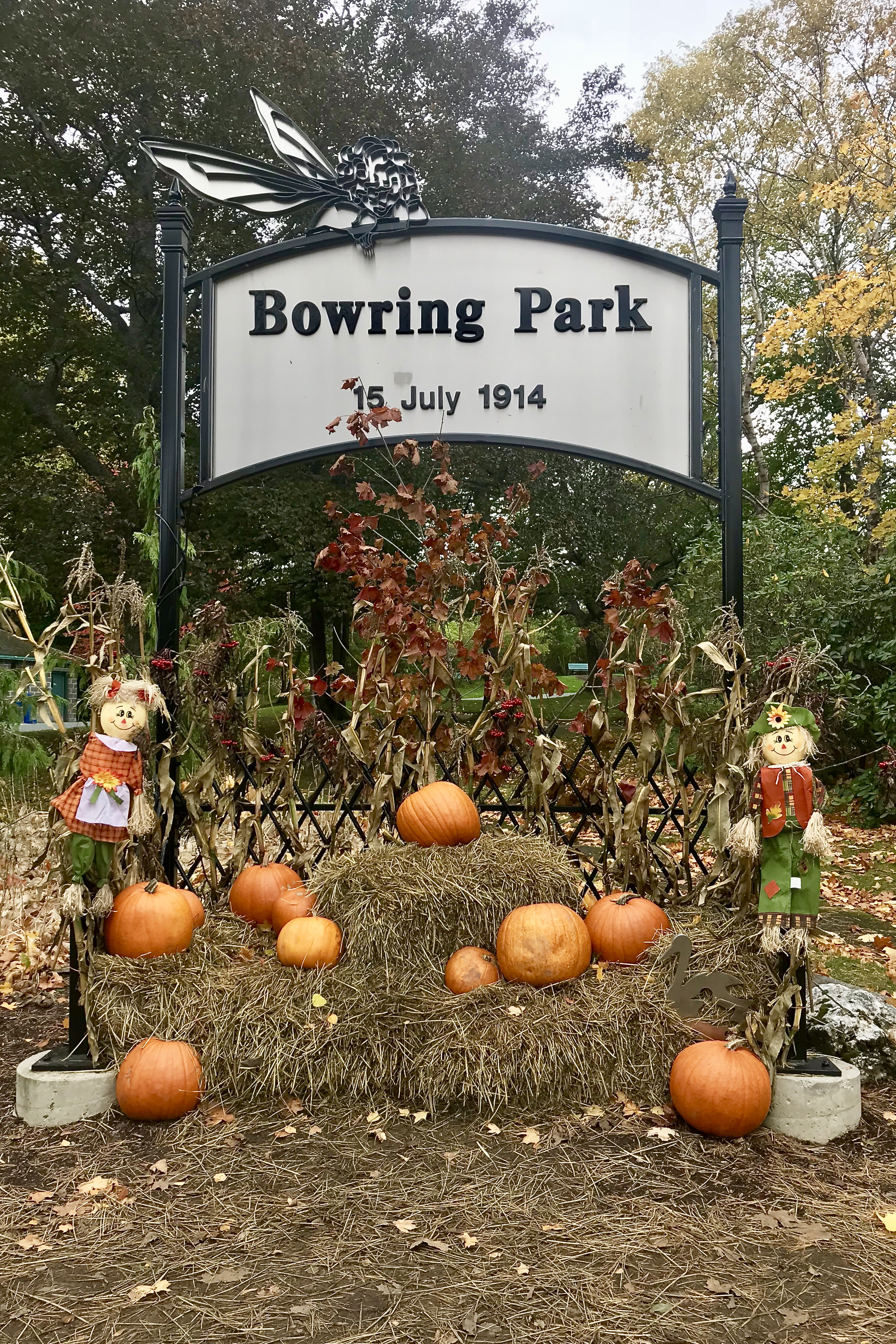
- Interactive map of Bowring Park
- Type: Urban park
- Location: St. John's, Newfoundland and Labrador, Canada
- Area: 200 acres (81 ha)
- Created: July 15 1914
- Operator: City of St. John's
- Status: Open all year

Bowring Park is located in the Waterford Valley, St. John's, Newfoundland, Canada. Entrance to the park is via Waterford Bridge Road, passing a sculptured duck pond and a Peter Pan statue.

== History ==
The land that Bowring Park currently occupies was originally a farm owned by William Thorburn known as Rae Island. The land was purchased and donated to the city in 1911 by Sir Edgar Rennie Bowring on behalf of Bowring Brothers Ltd. on their 100th anniversary of commerce in Newfoundland. Frederick Todd created the design and Rudolph Cochius was the landscape architect for the original section of the park. The park was officially opened by His Royal Highness, the Duke of Connaught on July 15, 1914.

The park has expanded to incorporate some of the surrounding areas. The original tract of land was 50 acres (200,000 m^{2}) on the east side of the park. In the 1970s the park acquired 150 acres (610,000 m^{2}) of land that once belonged to Sir Richard Squires, known as Midstream. The boundary between the old and new sections of the park is the pedestrian footbridge near the swimming pool. The bridge design and planning for the new section was completed by the noted modernist architect, Blanche Lemco van Ginkel in collaboration with Arup Partners. She presented her designs at the 1959 CIAM congress in Otterlo, Netherlands.

== Attractions ==
The park has many recreation facilities, including tennis courts, a swimming pool and playground. There are a number of statues in the park, including two sculptures by Basil Gotto, one a Caribou and the other The Fighting Newfoundlander. The Caribou is a replica of the monument at the Beaumont-Hamel Newfoundland Memorial Park was originally part of the Newfoundland Pavilion at the British Empire Exhibition and was presented to the park by Major William Howe Green, a cousin of Sir Edgar Bowring. The Fighting Newfoundlander, a tribute to the Royal Newfoundland Regiment with Corporal Thomas Pittman as the subject, was also a gift from Sir Edgar Bowring. The statue was unveiled by Sir William Horwood in September 1922.

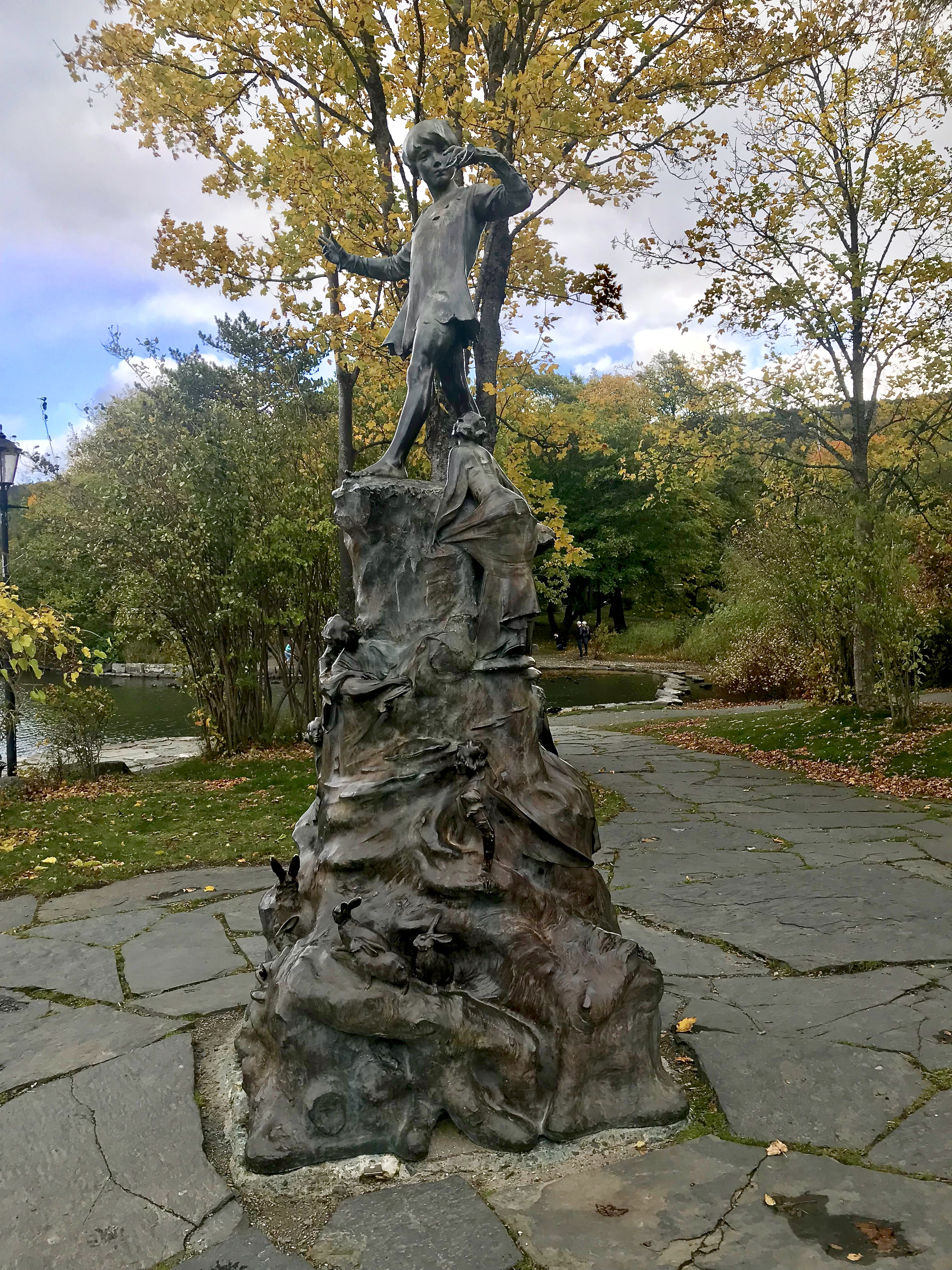
Peter Pan Statue, St. John's, Canada

The Peter Pan was erected in memory of Sir Edgar Bowring's godchild, Betty Munn, who had drowned along with her father at the sinking of Florizel at Cappahayden. The statue was unveiled on August 29, 1925 with the following inscription;

In memory of a little girl who loved the Park.

The building and erection of the statue was supervised by Sir George Frampton, the sculptor who created the original statue at Kensington Gardens, London.
