= Stéphanie Weber Biron =

Canadian cinematographer (born 1976)

Stéphanie Weber Biron (born May 21, 1976) is a Canadian cinematographer. She is a three-time Genie and Canadian Screen Award nominee, receiving nods for Best Cinematography at the 31st Genie Awards in 2011 for her work on Heartbeats (Les Amours imaginaires) and at the 9th Canadian Screen Awards in 2021 for her work on Nadia, Butterfly, and for Best Cinematography in a Documentary at the 8th Canadian Screen Awards in 2020 for City Dreamers.
