= Robin Middleton (architectural historian) =

British architectural historian (1931–2026)

Robin D. Middleton (1931 – 3 August 2026) was a British architectural historian, described as a leading authority on 18th-century French architecture and architectural theory by the University of Cambridge where he studied and worked. He was Professor Emeritus of Columbia University and was editor of Architectural Design and also head of general studies at the Architectural Association in London before he moved to New York City in 1987, where he resided until his death in August 2026.

== Early life and education ==
Middleton was born in South Africa but moved to England in the 1950s. He trained as an architect at the University of the Witwatersrand, Johannesburg and was a doctoral student under Nikolaus Pevsner at Cambridge University. He was awarded a PhD in 1958 with a thesis on the French architect Eugène Viollet-le-Duc and the rational gothic tradition.

His contributed to the rediscovery of a sustained interest in the structural finesse of Gothic architecture in 17th-century France, prompting a concern for the expression of structure in architecture, which, transposed into classical terms, took the form of the introduction of free standing columns in church architecture. The prime promoter of this practice was the Abbé Jean-Louis de Cordemoy, virtually unknown, the subject of two articles by Middleton in the Journal of the Warburg and Courtauld Institutes in 1962 and 1963. The notion served as a preamble, as it were, to Viollet-le-Duc’s explorations of structural expression as the basis of good architecture in the 19th century.

== Career ==
Middleton was technical editor of Architectural Design from 1964 to 1972 and introduced a section Cosmorama that replaced the News section in July 1965. It was ‘a commentary on buildings or on events throughout the world that impinge upon architecture’ and was printed on non-glossy rough paper, embracing topics such as new materials, ecology, disposability and electronic technology.

He was head of general studies at the Architectural Association, London, and librarian and lecturer in the Department of History of Art at Cambridge University from 1972 to 1987. He joined the Department of Art History and Archaeology at Columbia University in 1987.

Middleton appeared in the television series Art of the Western World in 1990 in two episodes exploring the Neo-Classical revival in 18th century France and England.

A festschrift in his honour, entitled Fragments: Architecture and the Unfinished: Essays Presented to Robin Middleton, was published in 2006 upon his retirement.

=== Archival holdings ===
A 1969 photographic portrait of Middleton taken by Monica Pidgeon is held by the Royal Institute of British Architects (RIBA) and papers of Robin Middleton are held in the archive of Columbia University Libraries. 35mm slides from Middleton's collection of original architectural photographs and research images were digitized by the Media Center for Art History at Columbia University. Photographs attributed to Middleton are held in the Conway Library at The Courtauld Institute of Art, London, whose archive, of primarily architectural images, is in the process of being digitised under the wider Courtauld Connects project.

== Personal life and death ==
While at university in South Africa, Middleton met Denise Scott Brown (née Lakofski) and her first husband Robert Scott Brown and they became firm friends, sharing the same interests. In 1956, she and her husband embarked on a six month trip to Italy on a route devised by Middleton to explore mannerist art and architecture. Middleton would later live with Scott Brown’s sister, the artist and architect, Ruth Lakofski (1933–2009), in East Village, New York for "many, many years".

Middleton died on 3 August 2026, aged 94.

== Selected publications ==
- "The Abbé de Cordemoy and the Graeco-Gothic Ideal: A Prelude to Romantic Classicism", Journal of the Warburg and Courtauld Institutes, Vol. 25 no. 3/4, Jul.-Dec. 1962.
- "The Abbe de Cordemoy and the Graeco-Gothic Ideal", Journal of the Warburg and Courtauld Institutes, Vol. 26 no. 1/2, Jan.-June 1963.
- Neoclassical and nineteenth century architecture, R. Middleton & D. Watkin, New York: Abrams, 1980
- The Beaux-Arts and Nineteenth-Century French Architecture, edited by Robin Middleton, London: Thames & Hudson, 1984, ISBN 9780500273326
- "Boullée and the exotic”, R. Middleton, AA Files 19 1990
- ‘Chambers, W. A treatise on civil architecture, London 1759’ in Sir William Chambers: Architect to George III, Published on the occasion of the exhibition at the Courtauld Gallery, London 10 October 1996 – 5 January 1997; *Nationalmuseum, Stockholm 20 February-20 April 1997 by Yale University Press, 1996, ISBN 978-0300069402
- The Idea of the City, R. Middleton (ed.), MIT Press, 1996, ISBN 978-0262631778
- “Soane’s spaces and the matter of fragmentation,” in John Soane architect: Master of Space and Light ed. M. Richardson and M.A.Stevens, Royal Academy of Arts, 1999
- Architecture of the Nineteenth Century, R. Middleton, D. Watkin, Phaidon Press, 2003, ISBN 1904313094
- Julien-David Leroy : In Search of Architecture, London : Sir John Soane's Museum, 2003, ISBN 0954228499
- Introduction to Julien-David Le Roy,The Ruins of the Most Beautiful Monuments of Greece, Getty Institute 2004
- Jean Rondelet: The Architect as Technician, Robin Middleton and Marie-Nöelle Baudouin-Matuszek, Yale University Press, 2007, ISBN 0300115679
