= Center for Architecture and Design =

Non-profit organization in Philadelphia, Pennsylvania

Coordinates: 39.9538°N 75.1604°W

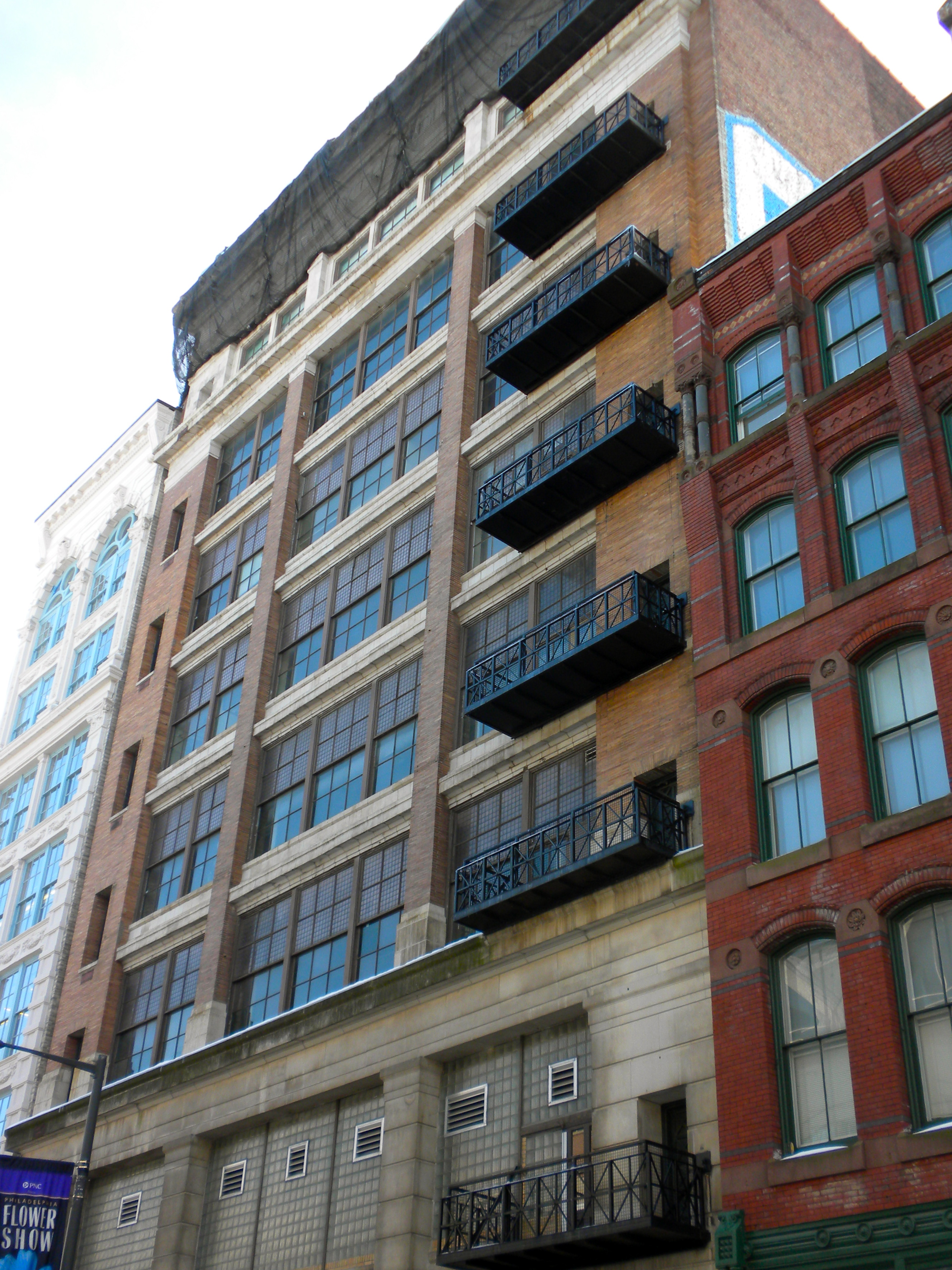
- Smyth Young Field Company Building at 1218 Arch Street
- Founded: 2002
- Type: 501(c)(3) charitable organization
- Location: Philadelphia, Pennsylvania, U.S.
- Region served: Greater Philadelphia
- Website: http://philadelphiacfa.org/

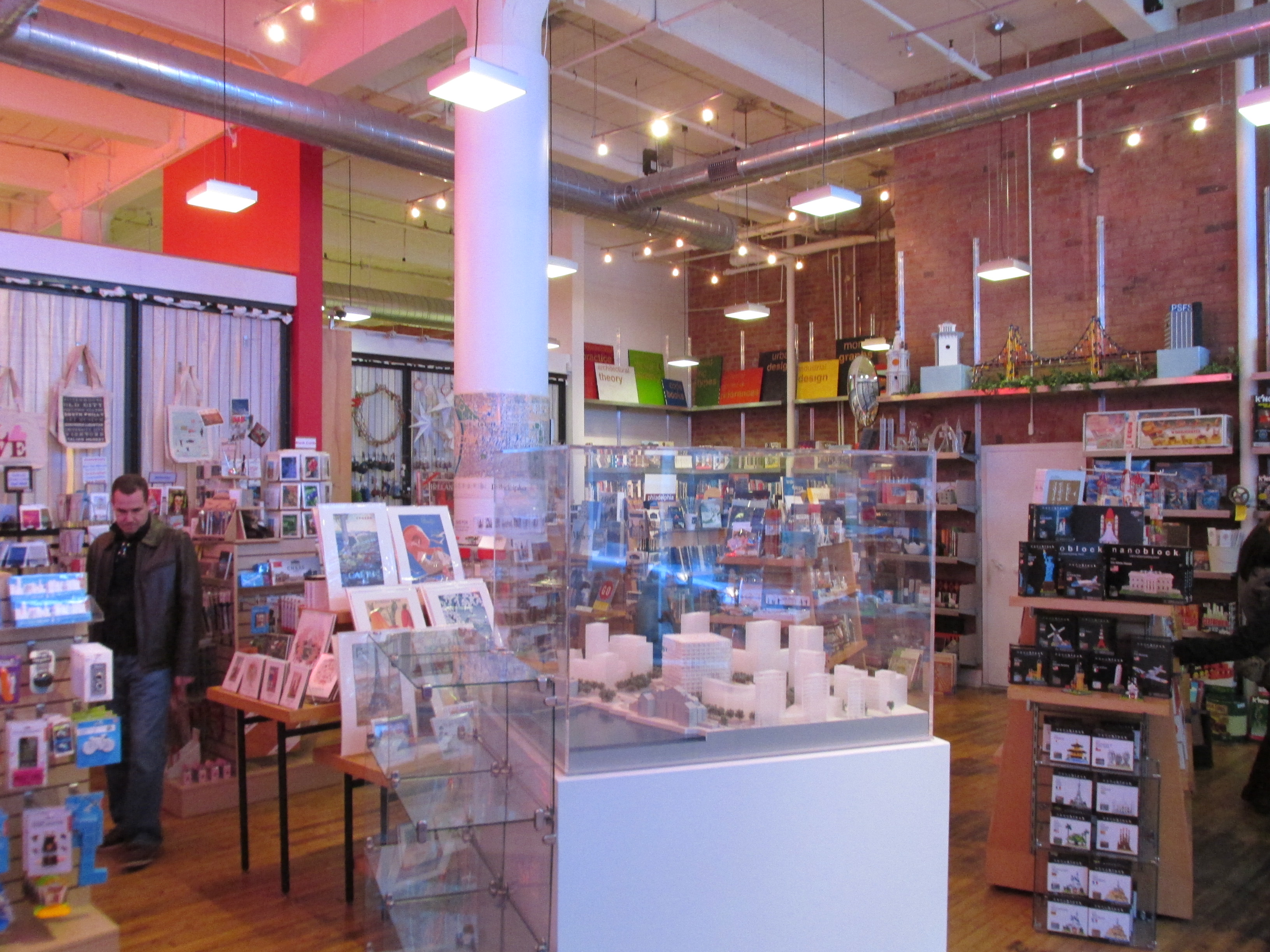
The AIA Bookstore at the Center 1218 Arch Street, Philadelphia

The Center for Architecture and Design is a 501(c)(3) non-profit organization located in Philadelphia, Pennsylvania. The Center produces educational programs related to the topics of architecture, urban planning, and design, including talks, workshops, festivals, design competitions, and exhibitions. Their venue at 1218 Arch Street serves as a public forum as well as a home for the offices of the Center, for AIA Philadelphia, and for the Community Design Collaborative. The organization was founded in 2002 by the Philadelphia chapter of the American Institute of Architects (AIA).

== History ==
AIA Philadelphia is the second oldest AIA chapter after New York, having received its charter in 1869. The Chapter is a registered nonprofit with IRS 501(c)(6) status, designating it as a professional membership organization. The Chapter includes members from Philadelphia, Delaware, Chester and Montgomery Counties in southeast Pennsylvania. AIA Philadelphia has a history of community engagement, including helping to create Independence National Historical Park [1948], the Community Design Collaborative [1991], the Charter High School for Architecture + Design [1999], and the Center for Architecture and Design [2002].

During John Claypool's tenure as executive director of AIA Philadelphia [2001-2014], the Center was established as a separate organization with IRS 501(c)(3) status, designating it as an educational non-profit. Its purpose was to support charitable and educational initiatives to benefit the community at large, on behalf of the architectural profession. In its early years, it produced educational and fundraising programs to support that mission, most notably the annual Louis I. Kahn Memorial Award + Talk, which brings a famous architect to speak in Philadelphia while raising funds to support the Charter High School for Architecture and Design.

The Center purchased and renovated a physical space on the ground floor of the Smyth Young Field Company Building in 2008. The building, at 1218 Arch Street, is listed on the National Register of Historic Places. Once its new home opened in May 2008 with a full-time staff member, the Center expanded its offerings to include walking tours, speaker series, workshops, film screenings, design competitions, exhibitions, children's programs, and a gift shop. The gift shop, the already established AIA Bookstore founded in 1976 by AIA Philadelphia, moved into the Center from its Rittenhouse Square location upon the Center's 2008 opening.

In 2013, the Center acquired the DesignPhiladelphia festival, which had been founded independently in 2005. In 2016, to better reflect its now expanded programmatic focus, the Center changed its name from the Philadelphia Center for Architecture to the Center for Architecture and Design, along with a rebranding initiative. At the same time, their facilities were renovated to allow further expansion of their programs and exhibitions. In 2018 the walking tour program, which launched when the Center opened in 2008, was transferred to the Preservation Alliance for Greater Philadelphia. Also in 2018, the AIA Bookstore, formerly located at the front of the Center, closed permanently.

== Programs ==
The Center produces a variety of annual and ongoing programs for the general public on the topics of architecture, urban planning, and design, including:

- Architecture in Education, an in-class program which introduces public school students to architecture and design (year-round)
- Better Philadelphia Challenge, an international urban design competition for university students (annually in autumn)
- Building Philadelphia: Architecture, History, + Politics, 10-part speaker series (annually in winter)
- CreativeMornings PHL, a monthly speaker series on creativity (year-round)
- DesignPhiladelphia, the oldest festival of its kind in the United States (annually in October)
- Edmund N. Bacon Memorial Awards + Talk, honoring an accomplished urban planner (annually in winter)
- Louis I. Kahn Memorial Award + Talk, honoring and accomplished architect (annually in spring)
- Park(ing) Day PHL, a one-day festival in which on-street parking spots become mini public parks (3rd Friday each September)
- Read + Make and Design + Build, hands-on workshops to introduce families to architecture and design (year-round)
- Spooktacular, a Halloween experience for families produced by young architects and students from the Charter High School for Architecture + Design (annually in October)

The Center's largest signature event, DesignPhiladelphia, was founded independently by Hilary Jay in 2005. She was inspired by one of the first design festivals, in London. The DesignPhiladelphia festival moved with Jay: from its founding at the Design Center of Philadelphia University in 2005, to the University of the Arts in 2010, and finally to the Center for Architecture and Design in 2013, where it remains today.

External videos
- “Constructing Play: Classic Building Toys”, Philadelphia Center for Architecture
- “A Decade of DesignPhiladelphia”, Philadelphia Center for Architecture

== Exhibitions ==
The Center hosts recurring and special exhibitions, including:

- CANstruction PHL food can sculpture competition and food drive (annually in spring)
- Constructing Play: Classic + Modern Building Toys (annually in winter)
- Degrees of Design: Student Work from Local Architecture + Design Schools (annually in spring)
- On The Rise: Emerging Firms + Young Architects (annually in winter)

== Organizations housed in the Center ==
- Center for Architecture and Design
- Philadelphia Chapter of the American Institute of Architects (AIA Philadelphia)
- Community Design Collaborative

== Leadership ==
Rebecca Johnson has served as executive director for both the Center and AIA Philadelphia since 2014. John Claypool previously served in this role from 2001 to 2014.

Hilary Jay became the first director of the Center in June 2013, serving in that role until May 2015.

David Bender was hired as the first full-time employee of the Center in May 2008 and has served as associate director since January 2014.

== Administration ==
Under the original 2002 bylaws, the AIA Philadelphia board held the authority to annually appoint the entire Center board. In 2016 the Chapter and Center boards each drafted updated bylaws to allow more independence for the Center while maintaining coordination between the two organizations. Under the new bylaws, the Chapter is authorized to appoint five of the Center's twenty five board members.

While both organizations' missions are focused on the built environment in Philadelphia, the Center's mission "to engage and educate the public about the importance of architecture and design to the quality of their lives" is distinct from AIA Philadelphia's mission to provide local architects with "opportunities for professional development, service, and collegiality among peers".
