= Blanche Lemco van Ginkel =

Canadian architect (1923–2022)

Blanche Lemco van Ginkel CM FRAIC
- Born: Blanche Lemco; 14 December 1923; London, England
- Died: 20 October 2022 (aged 98); Toronto, Canada
- Education: McGill University; Harvard University
- Known for: Architecture; landscape design; urban planning
- Notable work: Expo 67; conservation of Old Montreal
- Movement: Modernist architecture
- Spouse: Sandy van Ginkel (m. 1956; died 2009)
- Awards: Queen Elizabeth II Silver Jubilee Medal; Gold Medal of the Royal Architectural Institute of Canada; Order of Canada

Blanche Lemco van Ginkel CM FRAIC (14 December 1923 – 20 October 2022) was a British-born Canadian architect, city planner, and educator who worked mostly in Montreal and Toronto. She is known for her Modernist designs, as well as for planning Expo 67 and spearheading the preservation of Old Montreal. Lemco van Ginkel was the first woman to head a faculty of architecture in Canada and be elected a member of the Royal Canadian Academy of Arts. She was also the first woman to be awarded a fellowship by the Royal Architectural Institute of Canada and in 2020, was awarded their highest honour, the RAIC Gold Medal.

== Early life and education ==
Lemco van Ginkel was born in London, England, on 14 December 1923. Her family immigrated to Canada when Lemco van Ginkel was fourteen years old. After winning a scholarship, she attended McGill University, graduating with a degree from the university's School of Architecture in 1945. In 1948, she briefly joined Le Corbusier's studio (Atelier Le Corbusier), allowing her to work on the Unité d'Habitation project in Marseille, France. This experience exposed her to Modernist design concepts which she later introduced to other architects once back in Canada. Lemco van Ginkel continued her studies, graduating with a degree in city planning from Harvard University in 1950. Two years later, she registered as an architect, being only the fourth woman to do so in Quebec.

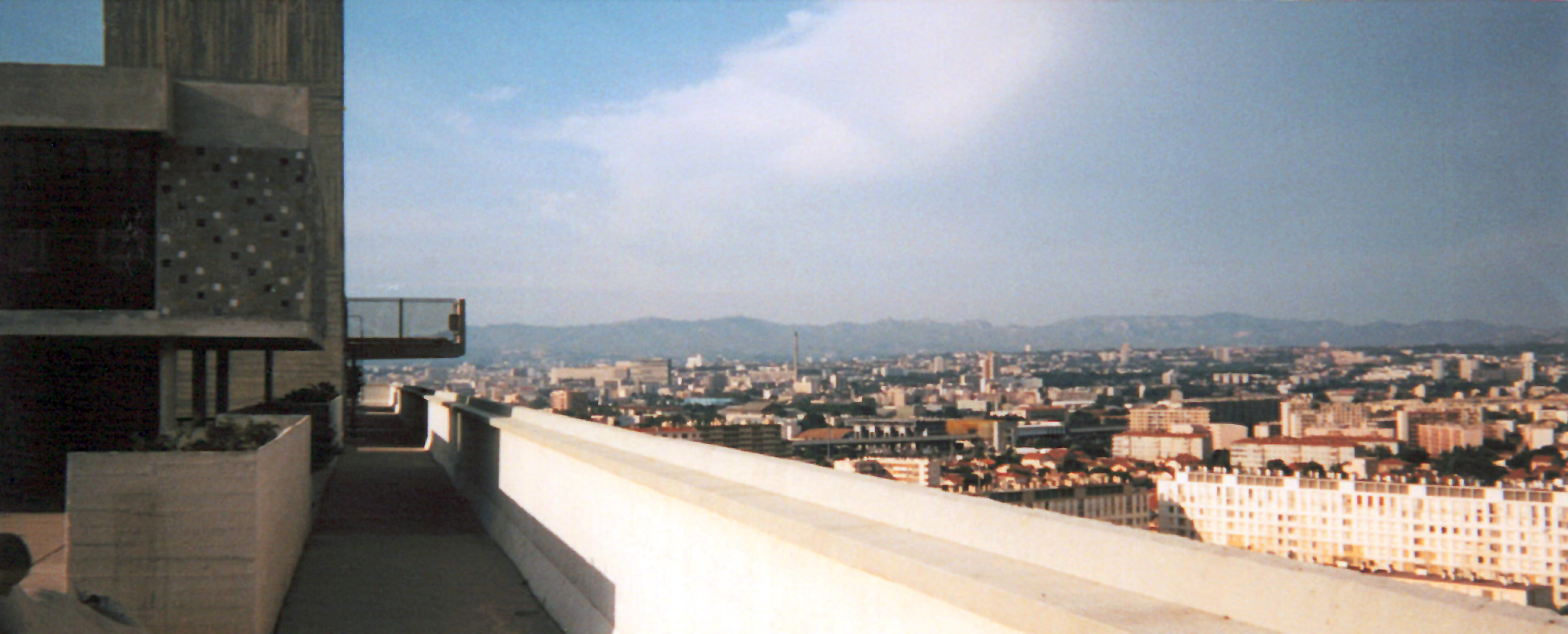
In one of her earliest projects, van Ginkel worked on the rooftop of le Corbusier's iconic Unité d'Habitation in Marseille. She would later write, "I designed the children's play area and the high parapet around the running track/edge of the roof. The idea was that the roof was like the square of a small town, with its usual facilities, and that one saw the Alpes Maritimes in the distance as one would over the house roofs. This is why the parapet is relatively high."

Lemco van Ginkel was a member of the Modernist think tank Team 10 and was involved in the early stages of the group, when it still belonged to the CIAM. In 1953, she attended the CIAM congress in Aix-en-Provence where she met her future husband and partner, Dutch architect Sandy (Daniel) van Ginkel. In 1957, they founded Van Ginkel Associates, a Montreal-based architecture and planning firm.

In 2014, Lemco van Ginkel received an honorary doctorate from McGill University for the impact she had on Montreal architecture and city planning. She was cited for being "a visionary, a mentor extraordinaire and a true citizen of the world."

== Career ==
=== Practitioner ===
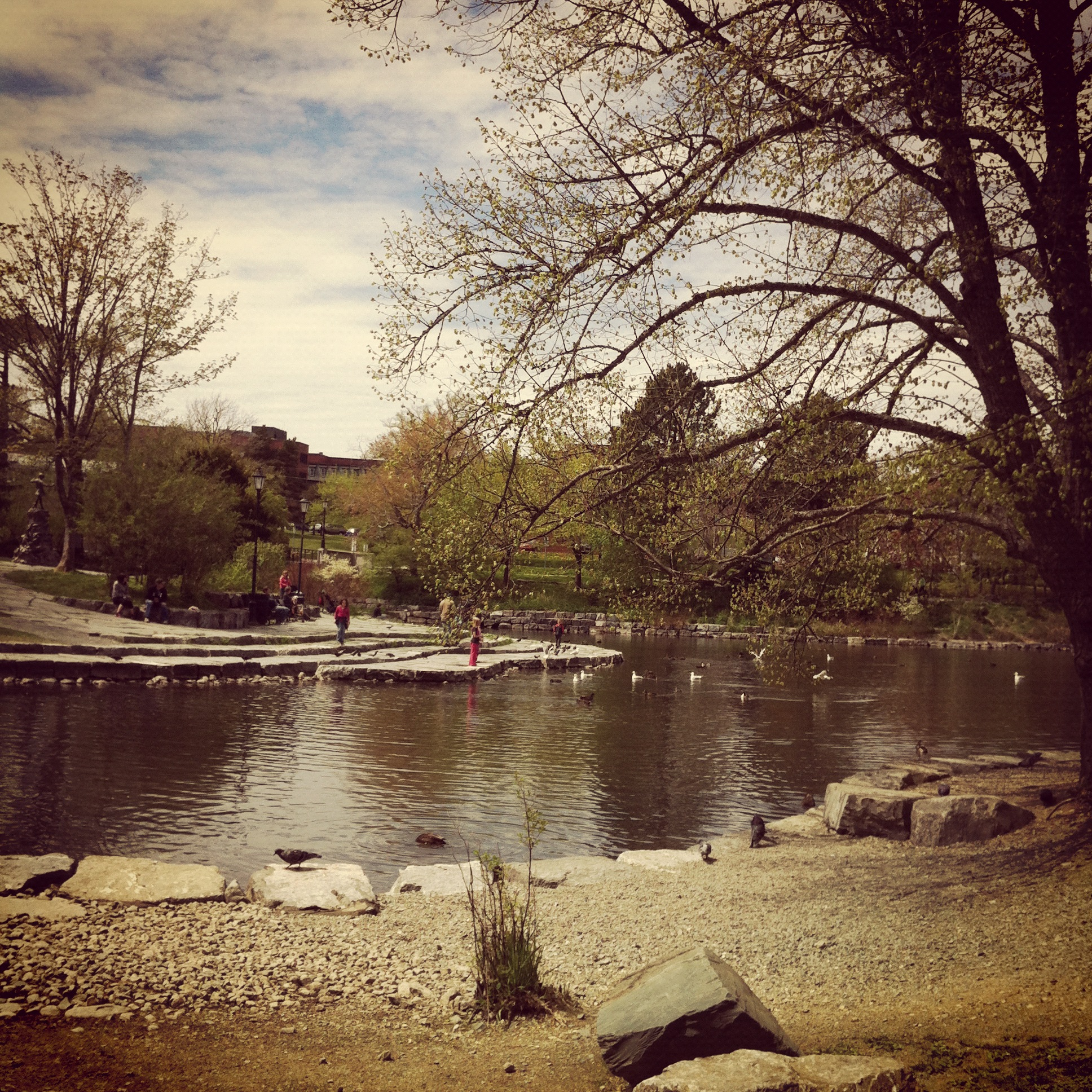
Bowring Park, St. John's, Newfoundland

Lemco van Ginkel was recognized for combining urban planning with her architectural skills, with a focus on modernist design as evidenced by the use of bold and unadorned elements. During the 1950s and 1960s, her firm headed projects including Bowring Park in St. John's, Newfoundland and Labrador, which was presented at the 1959 CIAM congress in Otterlo. This project included her work on the heritage-designated cantilevered pedestrian Van Ginkel Footbridge. Other Van Ginkel commissions included the central area plan of Montréal, the urban design of Midtown Manhattan, and the development of Pahang Tenggara, Malaysia.

Lemco van Ginkel and her partner were responsible for designing the master plan of the world fair Expo 67, an important cultural moment in Montreal's and Canada's history. She even recruited Moshe Safdie, who designed the iconic Habitat 67. The van Ginkels are also credited with having saved Vieux Montreal (Old Montreal) from new development. A detailed report they prepared prevented the construction of an elevated highway project that would have cut through the area. They are also known for their conservation efforts regarding Mount Royal, leading a successful advocacy project to stop the development of the mountain park's south slope.

As a female architect, Lemco van Ginkel was a pioneer, becoming the first woman officer and council member at the PQAA, the first woman officer and fellow at the Royal Architectural Institute of Canada, and the first woman president of the Association of Collegiate Schools of Architecture. She was also the recipient of prestigious RAIC Gold Medal in 2020.

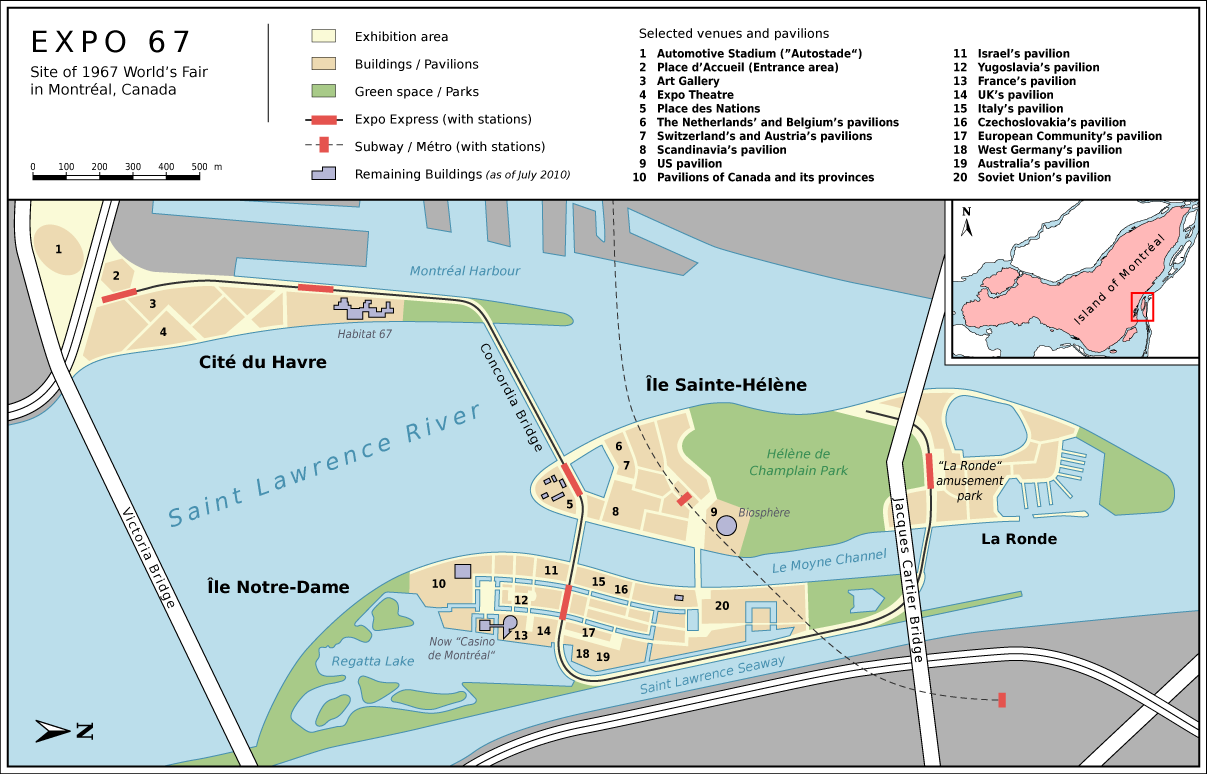
Map of Expo 67 site

=== Educator ===
Lemco van Ginkel taught architecture at the university level in the United States and Canada. From 1951 to 1957, she taught at the University of Pennsylvania, followed by stints at Harvard University, Université de Montréal, and McGill University. From 1980 to 1982, she was the dean of the faculty of architecture and landscape architecture at the University of Toronto, the first woman to hold such a position in Canada.

Lemco van Ginkel is featured with Prof. James Murray and producer Ian MacNeill in Suburban Living: Six Solutions (1960), a National Film Board of Canada film in which they conduct a critical evaluation of 5 European satellite newtowns and housing projects, including Harlow and Alton Estate in the UK, Unité d'habitation in France, Pendrecht in Holland, and Vallingby in Sweden, and contrast them with Canada's Don Mills.

=== Writer ===
Lemco van Ginkel regularly contributed articles to publications like "The Canadian Architect", "Canadian Art", "Architectural Design", and "Architecture Canada", as well as "Journal of the American Institute of Planners" and "Community Planning Review". She wrote about women working in the field, architectural education and modern city planning.

=== Activism ===
In her retirement, Lemco van Ginkel along with other former University of Toronto faculty Ursula Franklin, Phyllis Grosskurth, Cicely Watson, and their legal representative Mary Eberts filed a class action lawsuit against the University of Toronto claiming it had been unjustly enriched by paying women faculty less than comparably qualified men. In 2002, the lawsuit was settled when the university acknowledged that many of its female professors had suffered from gender barriers and pay discrimination during their careers. As a result, about 60 retired women faculty received a pay equity settlement intended to retroactively compensate them for the lower salaries and pensions they had received during their careers.

== Personal life ==
Lemco van Ginkel married Sandy van Ginkel in 1956 and had two children. He died in 2009. Lemco van Ginkel died in Toronto on 20 October 2022, at age 98.

== Awards and distinctions ==
Following is a list of awards and distinctions received by Blanche Lemko van Ginkel.

- 1956, Vienna Grand Prix, International Federation of Housing and Planning Congress
- 1964, Massey Medal for Architecture
- 1977, Queen Elizabeth II Silver Jubilee Medal
- 1991, Canadian Citation for Citizenship
- 2000, Member of the Order of Canada
- 2003, Ordre des Urbanistes du Québec
- Doctorate Honoris Causa, Université Aix-Marseille
- 2013, Chateau Ramezay and Heritage Montreal achievement award
- 2014, Honorary Doctor of Science, McGill University
- 2020 RAIC Gold Medal.

Lemco van Ginkel was the first woman to be elected as a Fellow of the Royal Architectural Institute of Canada in 1973, and in 2020 became the third to receive the RAIC Gold Medal after Phyllis Lambert (1991) and Jane Jacobs (1981). Alongside Phyllis Lambert, Cornelia Oberlander and Denise Scott Brown, she is one of four prominent female architects profiled in the 2018 documentary film City Dreamers.

== See also ==
- Sandy van Ginkel
- Van Ginkel Footbridge
