= Israel–Zambia relations =

- Israel: Zambia

Israel–Zambia relations refers to the diplomatic, economic and cultural relations between the State of Israel and the Republic of Zambia. Israel has an embassy in Lusaka. Zambia has an embassy in Tel Aviv.

== History ==
Israel and Zambia first established diplomatic relations in 1966, but then they were interrupted in 1973 following a recommendation of the Organisation of African Unity due to the Yom Kippur War. Relations were restored in 1991, but Zambia's embassy in Tel Aviv was only opened in 2015.

Israel reopened its embassy in Zambia's capital city Lusaka on 20 August 2025, after 52 years of being closed.

== See also ==
- History of the Jews in Zambia
