= City Dreamers =

- Directed by: Joseph Hillel
- Written by: Bruno Baillargeon; Joseph Hillel
- Produced by: Ziad Touma
- Starring: Phyllis Lambert; Blanche Lemco van Ginkel; Cornelia Oberlander; Denise Scott Brown
- Cinematography: Étienne Boilard; Léna Mill-Reuillard; Stéphanie Weber Biron
- Edited by: Heidi Haines
- Music by: Jean-Olivier Bégin
- Production company: Couzin Films
- Distributed by: Maison 4:3
- Release date: November 10, 2018 (RIDM)
- Running time: 80 minutes
- Country: Canada
- Language: English

City Dreamers is a Canadian documentary film, directed by Joseph Hillel and released in 2018. The film focuses on Phyllis Lambert, Blanche Lemco van Ginkel, Cornelia Oberlander and Denise Scott Brown, four significant innovators in contemporary architecture who were among the first prominent women architects.

The film premiered in November 2018 at the Montreal International Documentary Festival, before going into wider release in 2019.

The film received a Canadian Screen Award nomination for Best Cinematography in a Documentary at the 8th Canadian Screen Awards in 2020.
