= Smyth Young Field Company Building =

- Young Smyth Field Company Building
- U.S. National Register of Historic Places
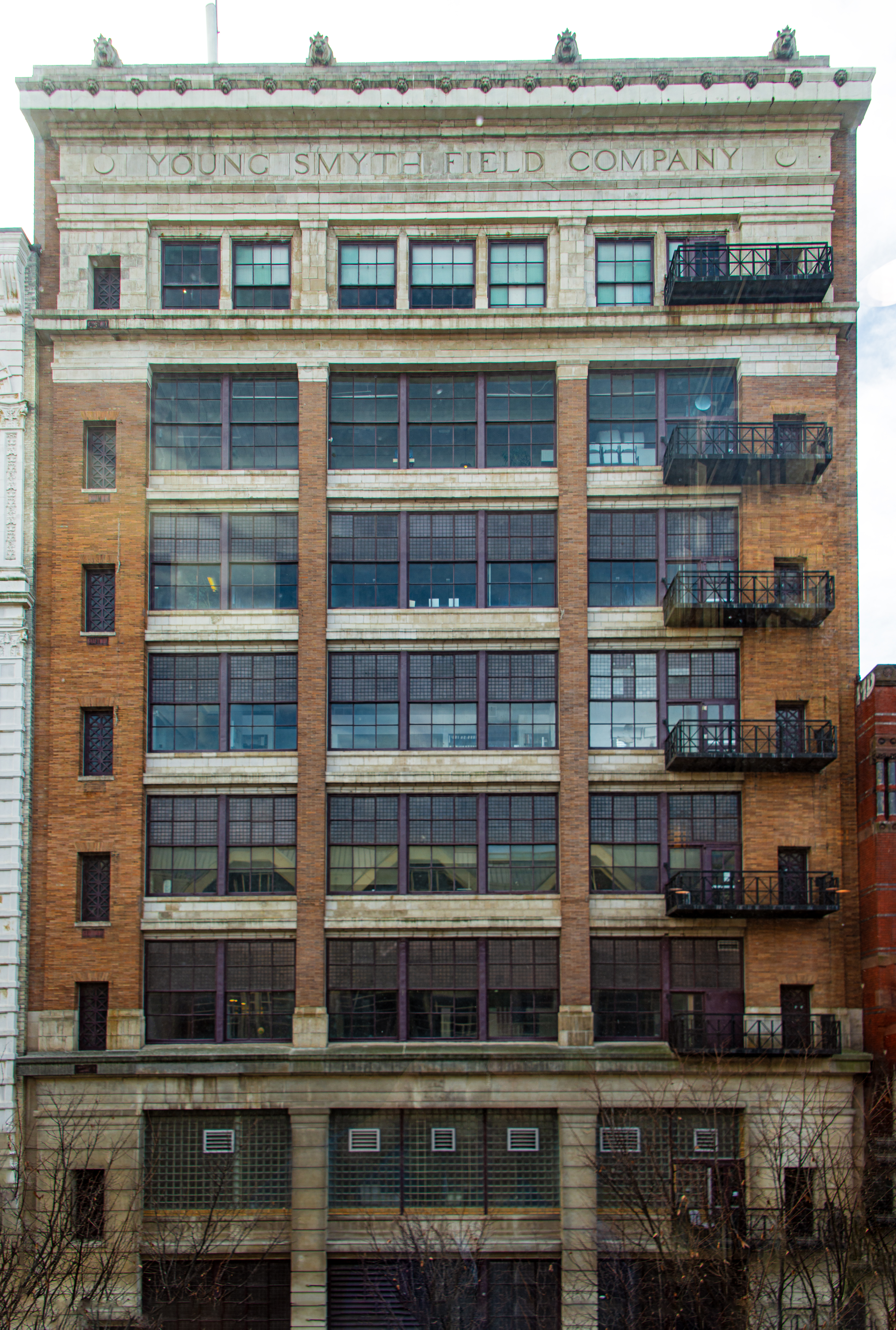
- Front elevation, 2020

- Location within Philadelphia Location within Pennsylvania Location within the United States
- Location: 1218 Arch Street, Philadelphia, Pennsylvania
- Coordinates: 39°57′14″N 75°9′38″W
- Area: less than an acre
- Built: 1902
- Architect: Field & Medary
- Architectural style: Early Commercial
- NRHP reference No.: 92001720
- Added to NRHP: December 24, 1992

Young Smyth Field Company Building is a historic light manufacturing loft building located in the Chinatown neighborhood of Philadelphia, Pennsylvania. It was built in 1902, and is an 8-story, 5 bay wide building, with a limestone and glazed brick front facade. It also has terra cotta details. The building measures 73 ft (22 m) wide and approximately 170 ft (52 m) deep.

It was added to the National Register of Historic Places in 1992.
