= Sandy van Ginkel =

Dutch and Canadian architect and urban planner

Sandy van Ginkel CM
- Born: February 10, 1920; Amsterdam, Netherlands
- Died: July 5, 2009 (aged 89); Toronto, Ontario, Canada
- Education: Utrecht University
- Occupation: Architect
- Spouse: Blanche Lemco van Ginkel (m. 1956–2009)
- Awards: Order of Canada (2007)
- Practice: van Ginkel Associates

Harmen Peter Daniel (Daniel, later Sandy) van Ginkel, CM (February 10, 1920 – July 5, 2009) was a Dutch and Canadian architect and urban planner. He was a leading force in the planning efforts surrounding Expo 67.

Van Ginkel studied architecture at the Elckerlyc Academy of Architecture and Applied Art in Lage Vuursche and sociology at Utrecht University. During the Second World War, he was active in the Dutch resistance. After his studies he worked in planning and architectural offices in the Netherlands, Sweden and Ireland and eventually had his own office in Amsterdam. He had several collaborative projects with Aldo van Eyck. As a member of the Congrès International d'Architecture Moderne he drafted the Doorn Manifesto of the Team 10 architects.

He married a British-born Canadian architect, Blanche Lemco, who he had met at the CIAM congress in Aix-en-Provence in 1953, and at the age of 37 moved with her to Montreal, where he established the design and management firm van Ginkel Associates. He subsequently played a major role in saving Old Montreal from destruction in the early 1960s. As assistant director of the city of Montreal's newly formed planning department, he persuaded authorities to abandon plans for an expressway that would have cut through the old city.

In 2007, he was made a Member of the Order of Canada in recognition for having "brought a greater appreciation of the impact of infrastructure on the character of urban development".

He died in his sleep on 5 July 2009, in a Toronto nursing home.
