= History of the Jews in Zambia =

Zambian Jews
יהודים זמביים זאַמביענער ייִדן

Languages
- Hebrew, Yiddish, English

Religion
- Judaism

Related ethnic groups
- Ashkenazi Jews, Beta Israel, Sephardi Jews

The location of Zambia in Africa

The history of the Jews in Zambia goes back to the early 1900s. Jews were always a small community with a notable role in Zambian history.

The history of the Jews in Zambia dates to 1901 when it was still under British Colonial rule. Northern Rhodesia was colonized in the 1890s by the British South Africa Company, otherwise known as BSAC. Initially, Northern Rhodesia was split into North-eastern and North-western Rhodesia. However, the BSAC united them in 1911 to form Northern Rhodesia, which has its capital in Livingstone, near Victoria Falls. Among the population of 1 million people, there were 1,500 white residents in Northern Rhodesia, of whom many were the Jewish settlers.

Northern Rhodesia became under British Colonial Rule partially so that the British Government could increase the number of white individuals and settlers in the country, which would contribute to a wider strategy to increase the influence that the British has between Kenya and South Africa. The Jewish settlers were one of the dominant ethnic groups and became highly involved in local politics, with prominent Jewish figures driving the push for Zambian independence and African nationalist rhetoric.

Northern Rhodesia's fertile land, World War II, and independence from the British Colonial rule all had a profound impact on both immigration and emigration of Jewish refugees. The Jewish diaspora introduced trade and commerce into the region in both regional and urban areas through cattle trading, ranching, mining, communication networks, storefronts, transport, and butchery, amongst others. The Jewish settlers, whether they are Jewish through origin, birth, marriage, or confession, all formed a small, yet strong community. The Jews in Zambia were a Jewish diaspora cultural and religious settler minority group, which raises concerns about the notion of who is the coloniser, who is the colonised, who is the victim and who is the oppressor.

This deems that it can be studied through a postcolonial framework. Following Zambia's independence in 1964, there was a large exodus of Jews and white individuals from the country. In 2022, there remains less than fifty Jews in Zambia. After existence for 130 years as of 15 June 2024 the total of Jews in Zambia numbers 11.

== Summary ==
Many Jews came to Zambia (previously called Northern Rhodesia) in order to achieve economic prosperity, first settling in Livingstone and Broken Hill. Some of the first Jews in Zambia were prominent in the cattle production and copper mining businesses. Livingstone already had a permanent Jewish congregation of 38 members by 1905, with the first Jewish wedding in Zambia taking place in 1910. Later on, many Zambian Jews achieved great success in the ranching industry and in the iron foundries. 110 Jews lived in Zambia (with a majority of them living in Livingstone and Lusaka) in 1921, and this population increased over the next couple of decades. Some Jewish refugees came to Zambia before and after The Holocaust, with the Jewish population of Zambia peaking at 1,000 to 1,200 in the mid-1950s (by which point "the center of Jewish life had shifted to Lusaka, the copperbelt center of the country"). Many Jews left Zambia and immigrated to other countries in the 1960s, with only 600 Jews remaining in Zambia in 1968. Jews were active and prominent in Zambian politics before Zambia became independent in 1964. The Council for Zambia Jewry was created in Lusaka in 1978 "to oversee Jewish communal activities." This council also "provides assistance to political refugees and the poverty-stricken with medical and financial aid." Only about thirty-five Jews currently live in Zambia, with almost all of them living in Lusaka. The Zambian Jewish community did not have a rabbi for several years by this point in time.

One of the more notable Zambian Jews is Simon Zukas, "who played a key role in Zambia's struggle for independence from Britain in the 1950s and went on to be a government minister after independence." Simon Zukas' father emigrated to Southern Africa from Lithuania in 1936 in search of economic prosperity during the Nazi's reign in Europe. The Zukas family opened a shop in the town of Ndola in Northern Rhodesia, a region which fostered a great Jewish population.

== Migration of the Jews to Zambia ==
Zambia's Flag (1964–1966).

Prior to 1964, what is now known as the independent republic of Zambia was formerly known as Northern Rhodesia as it was a British protectorate in south central Africa. During the 1930s there were already hundreds of Jews living in Northern Rhodesia however with the rise of the Nazis during World War II from 1939 to 1945, came a new wave of immigration. The first main wave of immigration of Jews to Zambia began in 1901 where pioneering European Jews were travelling through Southern Africa in search of prosperous economic opportunities. The inability of these European Jews to speak English meant that they were excluded from a large portion of jobs in mining, forcing them into trading, such as cattle trading. The second main wave of immigration of Jews to Zambia came in 1938 and 1939 as roughly three hundred German and Austrian Jews as well as smaller numbers of Lithuanian and Latvian Jews were fleeing Nazi persecution. The Jewish immigrants emigrating from Lithuania and Latvia mostly spoke Yiddish. By the early 1960s, there was a diaspora of around 1000 Jews residing in Northern Rhodesia. Northern Rhodesia was considered a safe haven for Jewish refugees as visas were readily available for those fleeing the Nazis, however its accessibility was not widely known. Austrian and German Jewish escape committees were not notified of the possibilities that Northern Rhodesia held for those fleeing Nazi persecution and was considered to be a closely guarded secret. In fact, no Jews were ever refused a visa, although it was kept a secret by the British Colonial Secretary, who oversaw facilitating the mass immigration of Jews to Northern Rhodesia from Central Europe. Reasoning for this is described by scholar and historian Frank Shapiro as, “while they were more than conscious of their obligations to their European coreligionists, they were also determined to protect their own positions in the British society. For the Anglo-Jewish leadership during the Nazi crisis the overriding priority was to defend their status as loyal British subjects and, at the same time, retain their stature in the Jewish Community and not feel threatened by any antisemitic claim of dual loyalty". Northern Rhodesia's mostly empty population, large fertile lands, and abundance of access to water deemed it a highly suitable place for mass immigration. A Commission was also sent to Africa by the Anglo-Jewish leadership team to assess possibilities for refugees, however no further action was taken, resulting in the failure to save large quantities of endangered Austrian and German Jews. During the World War II and the Holocaust, between 1939 and 1945, 225,000 Austrian and German Jews died yet only roughly three hundred Austrian and German Jews settled in Northern Rhodesia during that period. The planning committee continued to keep their knowledge of the safe haven of Northern Rhodesia a secret, and managed to convince the British Government to keep the file in secret archives even following the end of the war.

== Economic Influence in Zambia ==
Jewish people in Northern Rhodesia had a pivotal role in the formation of colonial African capitalism. Those that immigrated to Northern Rhodesia had brought minimal capital, however their status as refugees influenced their drive to become successful and make a living. Early Jewish immigrants who came to Northern Rhodesia in 1900 and 1901 engaged heavily in cattle-trading ventures which introduced other goods such as gold to the country as a means of transaction. Cattle stock was largely bought from Barotseland and then sold to Southern Rhodesia and neighbouring countries in both rural and urban areas. Economic development in the region by the Jews prompted the introduction of money and currency in the area. The adaptive nature of Jews meant there was a positive business relationship between stakeholders in the region, especially due to their inclination to communicate in the language and overcome racial barriers. Accordingly, “the Jewish traders came to be associated with fair trade, principled trading, and well-financed businesses”. By the 1950s, the individual wealth of the Jewish community had reached its height. The more developed economic landscape meant the Jewish settlers were diversifying their businesses, largely to ranching, butchery, transport networks, communication networks, storefronts, newspapers, and mining mineral exploration in both Northern and Southern Rhodesia.

== Jewish Congregation in Zambia ==
Whilst Jews were welcomed to Northern Rhodesia by the British colonial officers, some officers were considered antisemitic and made it difficult for Jews to obtain trading licences necessary for business. Historian Hugh MacMillan suggests that with early Jewish settlers in 1901, “the Jews arriving in Northern Rhodesia were both economic migrants and refugees, escaping from a kind of religious and political persecution in the Russian Empire, and also economic migrants looking for a place where they could make a better living”. These early Jewish settlers formed the foundation for the small Jewish community that later arrived in the 1940s, which collectively, were instrumental and highly influential in shaping Northern Rhodesia's Jewish diaspora, economy, and society. Individuals who had profound cultural and religious identities as Jews were particularly active in forming a Jewish community with numerous synagogues, Jewish organisations as well as Hebrew congregations, predominantly located in the capital of Livingstone. The Jews who were prominent in the Jewish community and religious life, were also active in the Zionist movement. The Zionist movement was a Jewish nationalist movement that sought to create and support a Jewish national state in the ancient homeland of the Jews, Palestine. Whilst Zionism originated in Eastern and Central Europe towards the end of the 19th century, it also spread globally and to Zambia. The population of Jews in Zambia fluctuated from 1901 to current day but has been no larger than 1,200 at its height. Integral to the growing Jewish community were the Susman brothers who were Jewish settlers who immigrated from Lithuania in 1901 and went on to run a successful empire in cattle trading, ranches, and copper mining. The Susman brothers were the leaders of Livingstone and were important in advancing the construction of Livingstone's synagogue in the late 1920s which acted as a meeting place for the Jewish settlers. In 2022, the building remains standing however no longer as a Synagogue, but instead as a Christian church.

=== Religion ===
The Jewish settler group in Northern Rhodesia mostly belonged to the Ashkenazi branch of Judaism which holds large differences in terms of levels of orthodoxy. In 1901, the first Jewish settlers came to Northern Rhodesia in search for work and predominantly consisted of men. There was a distinctive lack of women and children, which meant the settlers’ religious commitments such as family seder or sabbath evening meals and prays was absent because Judaism is frequently considered to be a religion of the family. The construction of Livingstone's synagogue in the late 1920s and the arrival of Jewish women and families was the beginning of organised religious practices and activity for the Jewish community in Northern Rhodesia. In 1910, the Livingstone Hebrew Congregation was formed along with land for a synagogue but was not used at the time. Following Zambia's independence in 1964, there was a mass exodus of the settler population which led to the era of the expatriates in Zambia and the decline of Judaism in the country.

== Political Developments ==
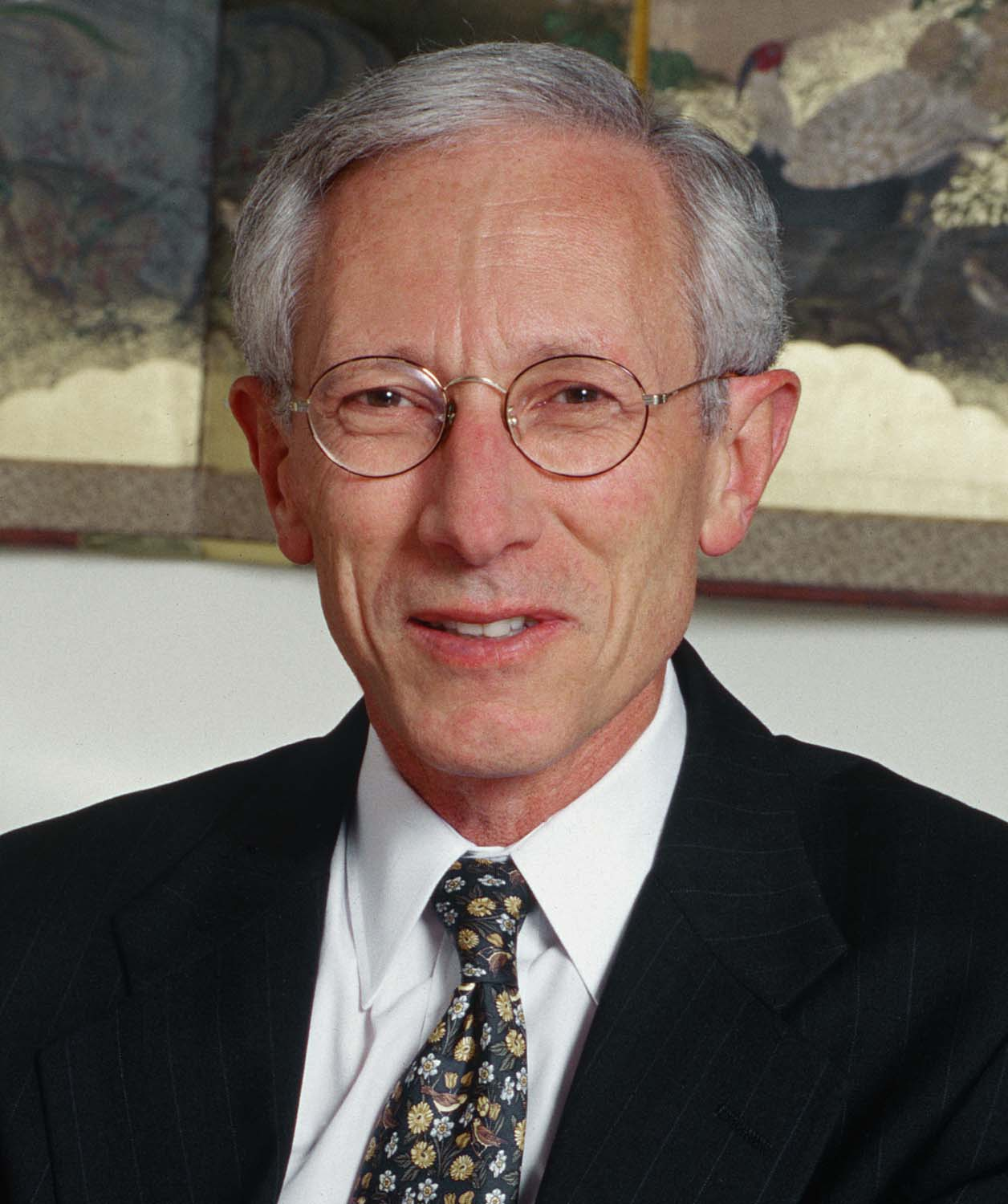
Stanley Fischer was born into a Jewish family in what is now Zambia.

The Jewish settlers were a predominant ethnic group in Northern Rhodesia and became active in the political life, most importantly in the struggle for independence from the British Colonial rule. There were a number of high-profile Jewish intellectuals and professionals that came from Jewish society, notably scholars Lewis Gann, Robert Rotberg, and Max Gluckman. Another key Jewish figure in Northern Rhodesia was Stanley Fisher, the governor of the Bank of Israel and formerly the head of the International Monetary Fund (IMF). Marking the title as the first Jewish major in Northern Rhodesia was Hyam Sculman, who was the major of Ndola beginning in 1937, up until 1939. These figures were highly relevant and important in creating the Zambian nation. There was a new generation of leaders in congress, some of whom were Jewish, who wanted Northern Rhodesia to become an independent African state. Led by civil servant Kenneth Kaunda in 1958, radicals split off from the rest of congress to form what is known as the Zambia African National Congress, later known as the United National Independence Party. When Zambia gained independence from the British Colonial Rule in 1964, it was prosperous, comparative to previous years. With the new found independence, copper prices continued to rise, making Zambia the world's third largest producer of copper.

=== Simon Zukas ===
A key political figure was Simon Zukas, who proceeded to become a government minister following the country's independence. Simon Zukas was a minister of works and supply as well as being a member of the United National Independence Party. Zukas’ father was amongst the refugees emigrating from Lithuania to Northern Rhodesia to escape religious persecution from the Nazis and in the search for employment. In reference to Simon Zukas, historian Frank Shapiro deemed that, “for a while he suppressed his political radicalism and concentrated on the process of adaptation”. However, Zukas embraced his political activism when he campaigned against British colonial rule in 1952. This political dissent led to his deportation, however, Zukas was permitted to return in 1964 with the ruling of Zambia's newfound independence. Zukas was an African Nationalist and leader of the Ndola Anti-Federation Action Group, and sought to end racial discrimination, a significant issue amongst black individuals living under British Colonial rule. The contents of the report ‘The Case Against the Federal Proposals’, written by Justin Chimba and more heavily, Simon Zukas, suggested that “the federation was aimed at halting African advancement in the Northern territories”, and that “federation on a basis of truly democratic principles might merit consideration by the people” (Swanzy, 1953). The political handover of power in 1964 prompted Jewish businessmen to leave Zambia as well as a mass emigration of the Jewish community, elicited by the pre-independence economic downturn between 1958 and 1963. Educational, political, and social concerns surrounding the creation of the independent Zambian state and the desire to not live under a black majority left only roughly one hundred Jews in Zambia by the mid-1970s.

=== Relations with Israel ===
On 20 August 2025, Israel opened its embassy in Lusaka in a ceremony attended by Israeli Foreign Minister Gideon Saar and Zambian Foreign Minister Mulambo Haimbe.

Zambia and Israel first established diplomatic ties in 1966, but Zambia severed its ties with Israel in 1973 following the Yom Kippur War. The two countries restored diplomatic relations in 1991, and in 2015, with Zambia opening its embassy to Israel in Tel Aviv.

== See also ==
- History of the Jews in Africa

=== Regions: ===
- History of the Jews in Central Africa
- History of the Jews in East Africa
- History of the Jews in North Africa
- History of the Jews in Southern Africa
- History of the Jews in West Africa

=== Topics: ===
- Bibliography of the history of Zambia
