= Hallward =

Hallward may refer to:

== People ==
- Bertrand Hallward (1901–2003), British university administrator
- Gloria Hallward (1923–1981) (known as Gloria Grahame), American actress
- Peter Hallward (born 1968), Canadian political philosopher
- Reginald Hallward (1858–1948), British glass artist

== Other ==
- Basil Hallward, an artist in the novel The Picture of Dorian Gray by Oscar Wilde
- Hallward Library, the main library of the University of Nottingham, England, named after Bertrand Hallward
