= Reginald Hallward =

British painter (1858–1948)

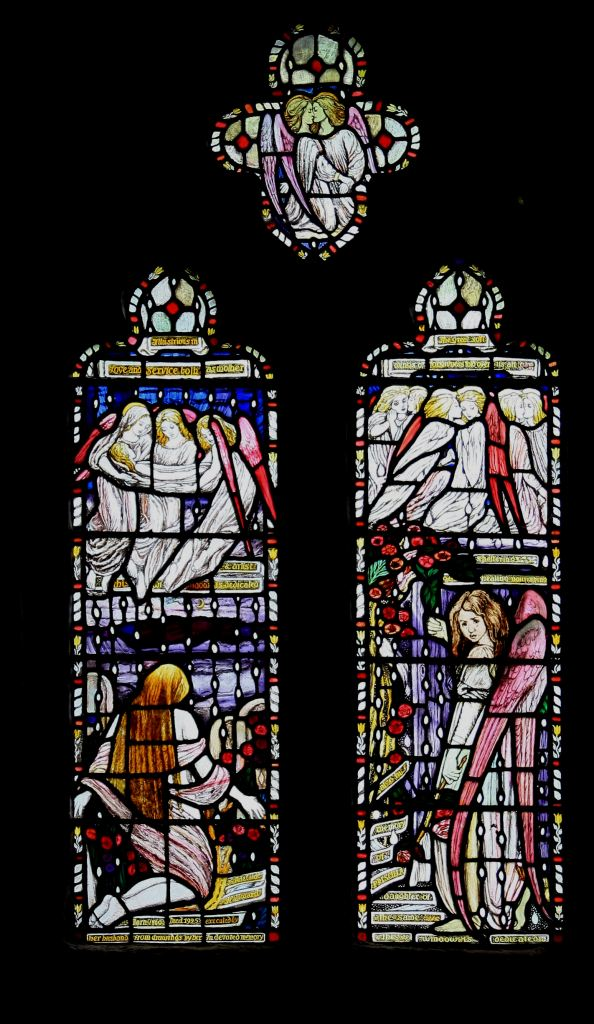
Window in St Peter and St Paul's Church, Shorne, Kent by Hallward

Reginald Francis Hallward (1858 – 30 March 1948) was a British artist. He was a glassmaker, poet, painter and book designer. He is best known for his stained glass and light glass works for British churches. Hallward founded a publishing business to publish his and his wife, Adelaide's, poetry. Following World War I, Hallward created war memorials in England, France and Belgium.

Some of his projects involved his wife, an artist and poet, and his daughter, also an artist.

== Education ==
Born at Sandown on the Isle of Wight, he was privately educated before studying at the Slade School of Fine Art and the Royal College of Art.

== Career ==
Hallward was the honorary secretary of the Clergy and Artists' Association over the control of which he publicly disputed with the Bishop of Rochester.

=== Glasswork ===
Hallward worked on stained glass and also painted tempera murals for several churches and throughout his life painted landscapes in oil. He was a regular exhibitor at the Royal Academy and the New English Art Club as well as the Royal Society of British Artists. The Dowdeswell Gallery in London organised several exhibitions of his work. He worked with Christopher Whall as a glassmaker during Whall's time at Dorking.

Hallward utilised the British Arts and Crafts style for his glasswork. He preferred to outline in black paint rather than have all his outlines in leaded glass. To ensure the quality he desired, he performed all the tasks for generating the final product. The tasks included "painting, firing and leading with his own hands."

=== Literature ===
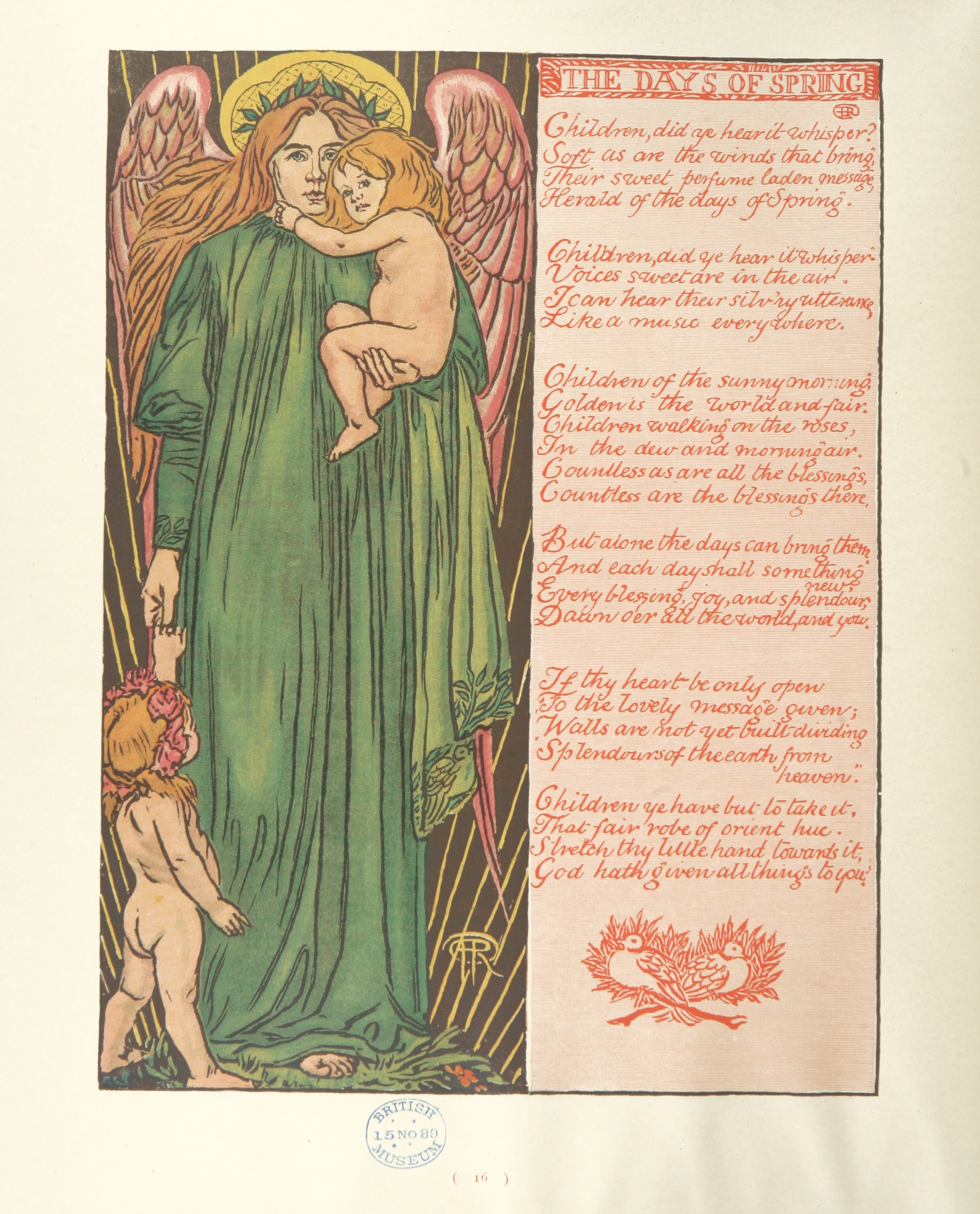
Page 20 of Flowers of Paradise. Music, verse, design & illustration by R. F. Hallward

For a period he ran his own press, the Woodlands Press. He printed his own verse which he illustrated with chalk drawings that he created or those of Adelaide. This enterprise brought him into contact with James Guthrie of the Pear Tree Press and the two were to remain close friends.

Hallward is claimed to have been the inspiration for Basil Hallward in Oscar Wilde's The Picture of Dorian Gray.

=== Paintings ===
Hallward painted the landscape Newport, Pembrokeshire in oil on canvas in 1937. The painting is part of the collection of the National Museum of Wales in Cardiff.

== Personal life ==
In 1887 he married Adelaide Bloxham who was also a painter, illustrator and author. They had three daughters, Faith Margaret, Patience Mary and Priscilla, and two sons, Michael and Christopher. His daughter Patience Mary Hallward (1892–1981) was also an artist and trained with her father. Like Reginald she finally settled in Merionethshire.

For part of his life, Hallward lived in North Wales in Mawddach Crescent, Arthog, Merionethshire. In 1901 moved to Shorne near Gravesend in Kent where he made his base until he retired to Arthog.

== Exhibitions ==
- 1906 - Hallward and his wife, Adelaide, both exhibited at the Clergy and Artists Exhibition starting 29 June 1906.
- 1921 - Exhibition of Hallward's work. Twenty-one Gallery.

== See also ==
- Memorial tablets to the British Empire dead of the First World War
