= George Dixon Grahame =

British diplomat

Sir George Dixon Grahame GCMG GCVO PC (28 April 1873 – 9 July 1940) was a British diplomat.

== Life ==
Grahame was the only son of Richard Grahame of Alderley Edge, and was educated at Charterhouse, in Hodgsonite House, between summer 1887 and autumn 1888.

He entered the Diplomatic Service in 1896, was attaché to the Paris Embassy in 1897, promoted Second Secretary in September 1902, appointed Chargé d'Affaires at Berlin the same year, then at Buenos Aires in 1903 and at Paris in 1905. He became Minister Plenipotentiary in 1918, participating in the peace negotiations and signed the Treaty of Sèvres on behalf of the United Kingdom and New Zealand. In 1925 he became British Delegate to the League of Nations. He was Ambassador at Brussels in 1920 and at Madrid from 1928 to 1935.

Grahame was a Knight Grand Cross of the Order of St Michael and St George (GCMG), and of the Royal Victorian Order (GCVO), a Privy Counsellor from 1920, and a member of the Grand Cross, Order of Leopold.

Grahame was an amateur painter and short-story writer.

He retired in 1935 and died at Rio de Janeiro on 9 July 1940. His obituary in The Times noted: 'The tallest man in the Diplomatic Service, his great height and his vivid blue eyes made him a notable figure in any gathering. His knowledge of the French language was profound.'
